= List of Austrian submissions for the Academy Award for Best International Feature Film =

Best International Feature Film submissions from Austria

Highlights
- Debut: 1961
- Submissions: 50
- Nominations: 4
- Oscar winners: 2

Austria has submitted films for the Academy Award for Best International Feature Film (Note: The category was previously named the Academy Award for Best Foreign Language Film, but this was changed to the Academy Award for Best International Feature Film in April 2019, after the Academy deemed the word "Foreign" to be outdated.) since 1961. The award is handed out annually by the United States Academy of Motion Picture Arts and Sciences to a feature-length motion picture produced outside the United States that contains primarily non-English dialogue. It was not created until the 1956 Academy Awards, in which a competitive Academy Award of Merit, known as the Best Foreign Language Film Award, was created for non-English speaking films, and has been given annually since.

As of 2026, Austria has been nominated four times and won twice, for The Counterfeiters (2007) and Amour (2012).

== Submissions ==
The Academy of Motion Picture Arts and Sciences has invited the film industries of various countries to submit their best film for the Academy Award for Best International Feature Film since 1956. The International Feature Film Committee oversees the process and reviews all the submitted films. Following this, they vote via secret ballot to determine the five nominees for the award.

The Counterfeiters (2007), directed by Stefan Ruzowitzky, was the country first winner. Followed by Amour (2012), directed by Michael Haneke, which was also nominated for Best Picture, Best Director, and Best Actress.

The country other nominees were: '38 – Vienna Before the Fall (1986) and Revanche (2008).

Great Freedom (2021) and Corsage (2022) advanced to the December shortlists, but were not nominated.

Most Austrian submissions were primarily in German. Austria's 2001 and 2005 submissions were filmed in French, and dubbed into German when they were submitted for consideration to the academy, while a subsequent rule change allowed them to send a third film in French in 2012. Austria's 2009 submission was mostly in Persian and Turkish, and their 2010 and 2023 submissions were in Italian.

Below is a list of the films that have been submitted by Austria for review by the academy for the award by year and the respective Academy Awards ceremony.

Year (Ceremony)	Film title used in nomination	Original title	Language(s)	Director(s)	Result
1961 (34th)	Jedermann		German	Gottfried Reinhardt	Not nominated
1969 (42nd)	Moss on the Stones	Moos auf den Steinen	German	Georg Lhotsky	Not nominated
1977 (50th)	I Want to Live	Ich will leben	German	Jörg A. Eggers	Not nominated
1979 (52nd)	Tales from the Vienna Woods	Geschichten aus dem Wienerwald	German	Maximilian Schell	Not nominated
1980 (53rd)	Egon Schiele	Egon Schiele – Exzesse	German, English, French	Herbert Vesely	Not nominated
1981 (54th)	Der Bockerer		German	Franz Antel	Not nominated
1983 (56th)	Tramps	Die letzte Runde	German	Peter Patzak	Not nominated
1984 (57th)	Just Behind the Door	Dicht hinter der Tür	German	Mansur Madavi	Not nominated
1985 (58th)	Malambo		German	Milan Dor	Not nominated
1986 (59th)	'38 – Vienna Before the Fall	38 – Auch das war Wien	German	Wolfgang Glück	Nominated
1987 (60th)	Welcome in Vienna	Wohin und zurück – Teil 3: Welcome in Vienna	German	Axel Corti	Not nominated
1988 (61st)	Undiscovered Country	Das Weite Land	German	Luc Bondy	Not nominated
1989 (62nd)	The Seventh Continent	Der siebente Kontinent	German	Michael Haneke	Not nominated
1990 (63rd)	Requiem for Dominic	Requiem für Dominik	German	Robert Dornhelm	Not nominated
1991 (64th)	I Love Vienna		German, English, Italian, Polish, Persian, Arabic	Houchang Allahyari	Not nominated
1992 (65th)	Benny's Video		German	Michael Haneke	Not nominated
1993 (66th)	Indien		German	Paul Harather	Not nominated
1994 (67th)	I Promise	Ich gelobe	German	Wolfgang Murnberger	Not nominated
1995 (68th)	Ant Street	Die Ameisenstraße	German	Michael Glawogger	Not nominated
1996 (69th)	Hannah		German	Reinhard Schwabenitzky	Not nominated
1997 (70th)	The Unfish	Der Unfisch	German	Robert Dornhelm	Not nominated
1998 (71st)	The Inheritors	Die Siebtelbauern	German	Stefan Ruzowitzky	Not nominated
1999 (72nd)	Northern Skirts	Nordrand	German	Barbara Albert	Not nominated
2000 (73rd)	The Stranger	Die Fremde	German	Götz Spielmann	Not nominated
2001 (74th)	The Piano Teacher	La Pianiste	French, German	Michael Haneke	Not nominated
2002 (75th)	Gebürtig		German	Robert Schindel, Lukas Stepanik	Not nominated
2003 (76th)	Free Radicals	Böse Zellen	German	Barbara Albert	Not nominated
2004 (77th)	Antares		German, Croatian, English	Götz Spielmann	Not nominated
2005 (78th)	Caché		French	Michael Haneke	Disqualified
2006 (79th)	You Bet Your Life	Spiele Leben	German	Antonin Svoboda	Not nominated
2007 (80th)	The Counterfeiters	Die Fälscher	German, Russian, English, Hebrew	Stefan Ruzowitzky	Won Academy Award
2008 (81st)	Revanche		German, Russian	Götz Spielmann	Nominated
2009 (82nd)	For a Moment, Freedom	Ein Augenblick Freiheit	English, Persian, Turkish	Arash T. Riahi	Not nominated
2010 (83rd)	La Pivellina		Italian	Tizza Covi and Rainer Frimmel	Not nominated
2011 (84th)	Breathing	Atmen	German	Karl Markovics	Not nominated
2012 (85th)	Amour		French	Michael Haneke	Won Academy Award
2013 (86th)	The Wall	Die Wand	German	Julian Pölsler	Not nominated
2014 (87th)	The Dark Valley	Das finstere Tal	German, English	Andreas Prochaska	Not nominated
2015 (88th)	Goodnight Mommy	Ich seh, ich seh	German	Veronika Franz, Severin Fiala	Not nominated
2016 (89th)	Stefan Zweig: Farewell to Europe	Vor der Morgenröte	German	Maria Schrader	Not nominated
2017 (90th)	Happy End		French, English	Michael Haneke	Not nominated
2018 (91st)	The Waldheim Waltz	Waldheims Walzer	German, English, French	Ruth Beckermann	Not nominated
2019 (92nd)	Joy		English, German, Nigerian Pidgin	Sudabeh Mortezai	Disqualified
2020 (93rd)	What We Wanted	Was wir wollten	German	Ulrike Kofler	Not nominated
2021 (94th)	Great Freedom	Große Freiheit	German	Sebastian Meise	Made shortlist
2022 (95th)	Corsage		German, French, English, Hungarian	Marie Kreutzer	Made shortlist
2023 (96th)	Vera		Italian	Tizza Covi and Rainer Frimmel	Not nominated
2024 (97th)	The Devil's Bath	Des Teufels Bad	German	Veronika Franz and Severin Fiala	Not nominated
2025 (98th)	Peacock	Pfau – Bin ich echt?	German	Bernhard Wenger	Not nominated
2026 (99th)	Rose		German	Markus Schleinzer	Pending

== See also ==
- List of Academy Award winners and nominees for Best International Feature Film
- List of Academy Award-winning foreign language films
- Cinema of Austria
