= 79th Venice International Film Festival =

Italian film festival in 2022

- Official festival poster by Lorenzo Mattotti
- Opening film: White Noise
- Closing film: The Hanging Sun
- Location: Venice, Italy
- Founded: 1932
- Awards: Golden Lion: All the Beauty and the Bloodshed
- Hosted by: Rocío Muñoz Morales
- Artistic director: Alberto Barbera
- Festival date: 31 August – 10 September 2022
- Website: www.labiennale.org/en/cinema/2022

Venice Film Festival chronology
- 80th 78th

The 79th annual Venice International Film Festival was held from 31 August to 10 September 2022, at Venice Lido in Italy.

American actress Julianne Moore was the Jury President of the main competition. Spanish actress Rocío Muñoz Morales hosted the opening and closing nights of the festival. The Golden Lion was awarded to All the Beauty and the Bloodshed by Laura Poitras making it the second documentary, following Gianfranco Rosi's Sacro GRA in 2013, to win the festival's top prize.

American filmmaker Paul Schrader and French actress Catherine Deneuve were awarded the Golden Lion for Lifetime Achievement.

The festival opened with White Noise by Noah Baumbach, and closed with The Hanging Sun by Francesco Carrozzini.

== Juries ==
=== Main competition (Venezia 79) ===
- Julianne Moore, American actress and author - Jury President
- Mariano Cohn, Argentine director, screenwriter and producer
- Leonardo Di Costanzo, Italian director and screenwriter
- Audrey Diwan, French director and screenwriter
- Leila Hatami, Iranian actress
- Kazuo Ishiguro, British novelist and screenwriter
- Rodrigo Sorogoyen, Spanish director and screenwriter

=== Horizons (Orizzonti) ===
- Isabel Coixet, Spanish filmmaker - Jury President
- Laura Bispuri, Italian filmmaker
- Antonio Campos, American filmmaker and producer
- Sofia Djama, Algerian filmmaker
- Édouard Waintrop, French film critic

=== Luigi de Laurentis Award ===
- Michelangelo Frammartino, Italian filmmaker - Jury President
- Jan P. Matuszyński, Polish filmmaker
- Ana Rocha de Sousa, Portuguese filmmaker and actress
- Tessa Thompson, American actress
- Rosalie Varda, French costume designer, producer, writer and actress

=== Venice Immersive ===
- May Abdalla - Jury President
- David Adler
- Blanca Li

== Official selection ==
=== In competition ===
The following films were selected for the main competition:

English title	Original title	Director(s)	Production country
All the Beauty and the Bloodshed		Laura Poitras	United States
Argentina, 1985		Santiago Mitre	Argentina, United States
Athena		Romain Gavras	France
The Banshees of Inisherin		Martin McDonagh	Ireland, United Kingdom, United States
Bardo, False Chronicle of a Handful of Truths	Bardo, falsa crónica de unas cuantas verdades	Alejandro G. Iñárritu	Mexico
Beyond the Wall	شب، داخلی، دیوار	Vahid Jalilvand	Iran
Blonde		Andrew Dominik	United States
Bones and All		Luca Guadagnino	Italy, United States
Chiara		Susanna Nicchiarelli	Belgium, Italy
A Couple	Un Couple	Frederick Wiseman	France, United States
The Eternal Daughter		Joanna Hogg	United Kingdom, United States
L'immensità		Emanuele Crialese	France, Italy
Lord of the Ants	Il signore delle formiche	Gianni Amelio	Italy
Love Life		Kōji Fukada	Japan, France
Monica		Andrea Pallaoro	Italy, United States
No Bears	خرس نیست	Jafar Panahi	Iran
Other People's Children	Les Enfants des Autres	Rebecca Zlotowski	France
Our Ties	Les Miens	Roschdy Zem	France
Saint Omer		Alice Diop	France
The Son		Florian Zeller	United Kingdom, United States
Tár		Todd Field	Germany, United States
The Whale		Darren Aronofsky	United States
White Noise (opening film)		Noah Baumbach	United Kingdom, United States

=== Out of Competition ===
The following films were selected to be screened out of competition:

English title	Original title	Director(s)	Production country
Fiction
Call of God	Kõne taevast	Kim Ki-duk	Estonia, Lithuania, Kyrgyzstan
Dead for a Dollar		Walter Hill	United States
Don't Worry Darling		Olivia Wilde	United States
Dreamin' Wild		Bill Pohlad	United States
Dry	Siccità	Paolo Virzì	Italy
The Hanging Sun (closing film)		Francesco Carrozzini	Italy
Living		Oliver Hermanus	United Kingdom
Master Gardener		Paul Schrader	United States
Pearl		Ti West	United States
When the Waves Are Gone	Kapag Wala Na Ang Mga Alon	Lav Diaz	Philippines, France, Portugal, Denmark
Non Fiction
Bobi Wine: Ghetto President		Christopher Sharp, Moses Bwayo	Uganda, United Kingdom, United States
A Compassionate Spy		Steve James	United States
Freedom on Fire: Ukraine’s Fight for Freedom		Evgeny Afineevsky	Ukraine, United Kingdom, United States
Gli ultimi giorni dell'umanità		Enrico Ghezzi, Alessandro Gagliardo	Italy
In Viaggio		Gianfranco Rosi	Italy
The Kiev Trial		Sergei Loznitsa	Netherland, Ukraine
The Matchmaker		Benedetta Argentieri	Italy
Music for Black Pigeons		Jørgen Leth, Andreas Koefoed	Denmark
Nuclear		Oliver Stone	United States
Series
Copenhagen Cowboy		Nicolas Winding Refn	Denmark
The Kingdom Exodus	Riget Exodus	Lars von Trier	Denmark

=== Orizzonti ===
The lineup of films selected for the Horizons section is as follows:

English title	Original title	Director(s)	Production country
A Man	ある男	Kei Ishikawa	Japan
Autobiography		Makbul Mubarak	Indonesia, France, Singapore, The Philippines, Germany, Qatar
Blanquita		Fernando Guzzoni	Chile, Mexico
Bread and Salt	Chleb i sól	Damian Kocur	Poland
The Bride		Sergio Trefaut	Portugal
Burning Hearts	Ti mangio il cuore	Pippo Mezzapesa	Italy
For My Country	Pour la France	Rachid Hami	France, Taiwan
The Happiest Man in the World	Најсреќниот човек на светот	Teona Strugar Mitevska	North Macedonia, Denmark, Belgium, Bosnia and Herzegovina, Croatia, Slovenia
Innocence		Guy Davidi	Denmark, Israel, Finland, Iceland
Luxembourg, Luxembourg	Люксембург, Люксембург	Antonio Lukich	Ukraine
On the Fringe	En los márgenes	Juan Diego Botto	Spain
Princess (opening film)		Roberto De Paolis	Italy
The Sitting Duck	La Syndicaliste	Jean-Paul Salomé	France
To the North		Mihai Mincan	Romania, France, Greece, Bulgaria, Czech Republic
Trenque Lauquen		Laura Citarella	Argentina, Germany
Vera		Tizza Covi, Rainer Frimmel	Austria
Victim		Michal Blasko	Slovakia, Czech Republic, Germany
World War III	جنگ جهانی سوم	Houman Seyyedi	Iran

=== Horizons Extra ===
English title	Original title	Director(s)	Production country
Amanda		Carolina Cavalli	Italy
Goliath		Adilkhan Yerzhanov	
Hanging Gardens	جنائن معلقة	Ahmed Yassin Al Daradji	Iraq, Palestine, Saudi Arabia, Egypt, United Kingdom
Nezouh		Soudade Kaadan	United Kingdom, Syria, France
Notte fantasma		Fulvio Risuleo	Italy
The Origin of Evil	L'Origine du mal	Sébastien Marnier	France, Canada
Red Shoes		Carlos Eichelmann Kaiser	Mexico, Italy
Valeria Is Getting Married	Valeria Mithatenet	Michal Vinik	Israel
Without Her	بی رویا	Arian Vazirdaftari	Iran

=== Venice Immersive ===
The lineup of films selected for the Venice Immersive section is as follows:

==== In competition ====
English title	Original title	Director(s)	Production country
Ascenders		Jonathan Astruc and Jonathana Tamene	France
Stay Alive My Son	Tu Vivras, Mon Fils	Voctira Bousis	Greece, United States
Reimagined Volume 1: Nyssa		Julie Cavaliere	United States
Rencontre(s)		Mathias Chelebourg	France
The Man Who Couldn't Leave		Chen Singing	Taipei
All Unsaved Progress Will Be Lost		Mélanie Courtinat	France
Eurydice, A Descent into Infinity	Eurydice, Een Afdaling in Oneindigheid	Celine Daemen	Netherlands
Okawari		Landia Egal and Amaury Burthie	France, Canada
Dazzle: A Re-Assembly of Bodies		Ruth Gibson, Bruno Martelli, Alexa Pollmann, and Bine Roth	United Kingdom
Peaky Blinders: The King's Ransom		Russell Harding, Tim Jones, and Marcus Moresby	United Kingdom
Treasure Heist		Luan Trinh	United States
From the Main Square		Pedro Harres	Germany
Sorella's Story		Peter Hegedus	Australia, Hungary, Sweden
Eggscape		German Heller, Jorge Tereso, and Federico Heller	Argentina
Typeman		Keisuke Itoh	Japan
Kindred		Bambou Kenneth	United Kingdom
Poet's Room	Shineui Bang	Bomsok Ku	South Korea
Gumball Dreams		Deirdre V. Lyons and Christopher Davis	United States
Namuanki		Kevin Mack	United States
Darkening	Tmání	Ondrej Moravec	Czech Republic, Germany
Eternelle, Notre Dame		Bruno Seillier	France
All That Remains		Quintero Craig	Taipei
Rock Paper Scissors		Alex Ruhl	United Kingdom
Thank You for Sharing Your World		Yu Sakudo and Toshiaki Hanzaki	Japan
Framerate: Pulse of the Earth		Matthew Shaw and William Trossell	United Kingdom
Mrs. Benz: Voyage of Discovery		Eloise Singer	United Kingdom
Uncanny Alley		Rick Treweek	South Africa
Fight Back		Celine Tricart	France, United States
Mandala: A Brief Moment in Time		Thomse Villepoux	China, France

==== Biennale College Cinema VR – Out of competition ====
Original Title	Director(s)	Production country
Elele	Sjoerd van Acker	Netherlands
Mono	Chiara Troisi	Italy
Chroma 11	Tsang Tsui-Shan	Hong Kong

==== Best of Immersive – Out of competition ====
Original title	Director(s)	Production country
On the Morning You Wake (to the End of the World)	Mike Brett, Steve Jamison, Pierre Zandrowicz, and Arnaud Colinart	France, United Kingdom, United States
(Hi)story of a Painting: The Light in the Shadow	Quentin Darras and Gaelle Mourre	United Kingdom
Area Man Lives	Amy Green and Ryan Green	United States
Lustration	Ryan Griffen	Australia, United States
Alex Honnold: The Soloist VR	Jonathan Griffith	France, United States
Space Explorers: The ISS Experience: Episode 3, Unite	Félix Lajeunesse and Paul Raphael	Canada
Space Explorers: The ISS Experience: Spacewalkers	Félix Lajeunesse and Paul Raphael	Canada
Kingdom of Plants with David Attenborough	Iona McEwan	United Kingdom, United States
The Miracle Basket	Abner Preis	Netherlands
Shores of Loci	Ellen Utrecht, James Sundra, Dani Bittman, and Daisy Berns	United States

==== Special Screening Event – Out of competition ====
Original Title	Director(s)	Production country
We Met in Virtual Reality	Joe Hunting	United Kingdom

== Independent Sections ==
=== Venice International Critics' Week ===
The lineup of films selected for the 37th Venice International Critics' Week is as follows:

English title	Original title	Director(s)	Production country
In competition
Anhell69		Theo Montoya	Colombia
Beating Sun	Tant que le soleil frappe	Philippe Petit	France
Dogborn		Isabella Carbonell	Sweden
Eismayer		David Wagner	Austria
Have You Seen This Woman?	Да ли сте видели ову жену?	Dušan Zorić, Matija Gluščević	Serbia, Croatia
Margins	Margini	Niccolò Falsetti	Italy
Skin Deep	Aus meiner Haut	Alex Schaad	Germany
Out of competition
Three Nights a Week (opening film)		Florent Gouelou	France
Blood		Pedro Costa	Portugal
Queens (closing film)		Yasmine Benkiran	Morocco
SIC@SIC Short Italian Cinema
Albertine Where Are You?		Maria Guidone	Italy
Like Snails	Come le lumache	Margherita Panizon	Italy
Nostos		Mauro Zingarelli	Italy
Sapling	Puiet	Lorenzo Fabbro, Bronte Stahl	Italy, United States, Romania
Reginetta		Federico Russotto	Italy
Remains	Resti	Federico Fadiga	Italy
Lucid Room	La stanza lucida	Chiara Caterina	Italy

=== Giornate degli Autori ===
The following films were selected for the Giornate degli Autori section:

English title	Original title	Director(s)	Production country
In competition
Bentu		Salvatore Mereu	Italy
Blue Jean		Georgia Oakley	United Kingdom
The Damned Don’t Cry		Fyzal Boulifa	France, Belgium, Morocco
Dirty, Difficult, Dangerous (opening film)		Wissam Charaf	France, Italy, Lebanon
The Last Queen		Adila Bendimerad and Damien Ounouri	Algeria, France, Saudi Arabia, Qatar, Taiwan
The Maiden		Graham Foy	Canada, United States
Ordinary Failures	Běžná selhání	Cristina Groșan	Czech Republic, Hungary, Italy, Slovakia
Padre Pio		Abel Ferrara	Italy, Germany, United Kingdom
Stonewalling		Huang Ji and Otsuka Ryuji	Japan
Wolf and Dog	Lobo e Cão	Cláudia Varejão	Portugal, France
Out of competition
Olimpia’s Way		Corrado Ceron	Italy
Alone	تنها	Jafar Najafi	Iran
We’re Here to Try		Greta De Lazzaris, Jacopo Quadri	Italy
Casa Susanna		Sebastien Lifshitz	Italy
March on Rome		Mark Cousins	Italy
La fornace		Daniele Ciprì	Italy
The Listener (closing film)		Steve Buscemi	United States
Venice Nights
Land of Upright People		Christian Carmosino Mereu	Italy
Kristos, the Last Child		Giulia Amati	Italy
The Crown Shyness		Valentina Bertani	Italy
Las leonas		Isabel Achával, Chiara Biondi	Italy
Le favolose		Roberta Torre	Italy
Pablo from Neanderthal		Antonello Matarazzo	Italy
Se fate i bravi		Stefano Collizzoli, Daniele Gaglianone	Italy
The Bone Breakers		Vincenzo Pirrotta	Italy
An Invisible Enemy		Riccardo Campagna, Federico Savonitto	Italy
Women's Tales Project
Carta a mi madre para mi hijo		Carla Simón	Italy
House Comes with a Bird		Janicza Bravo	Italy

== Official Awards ==
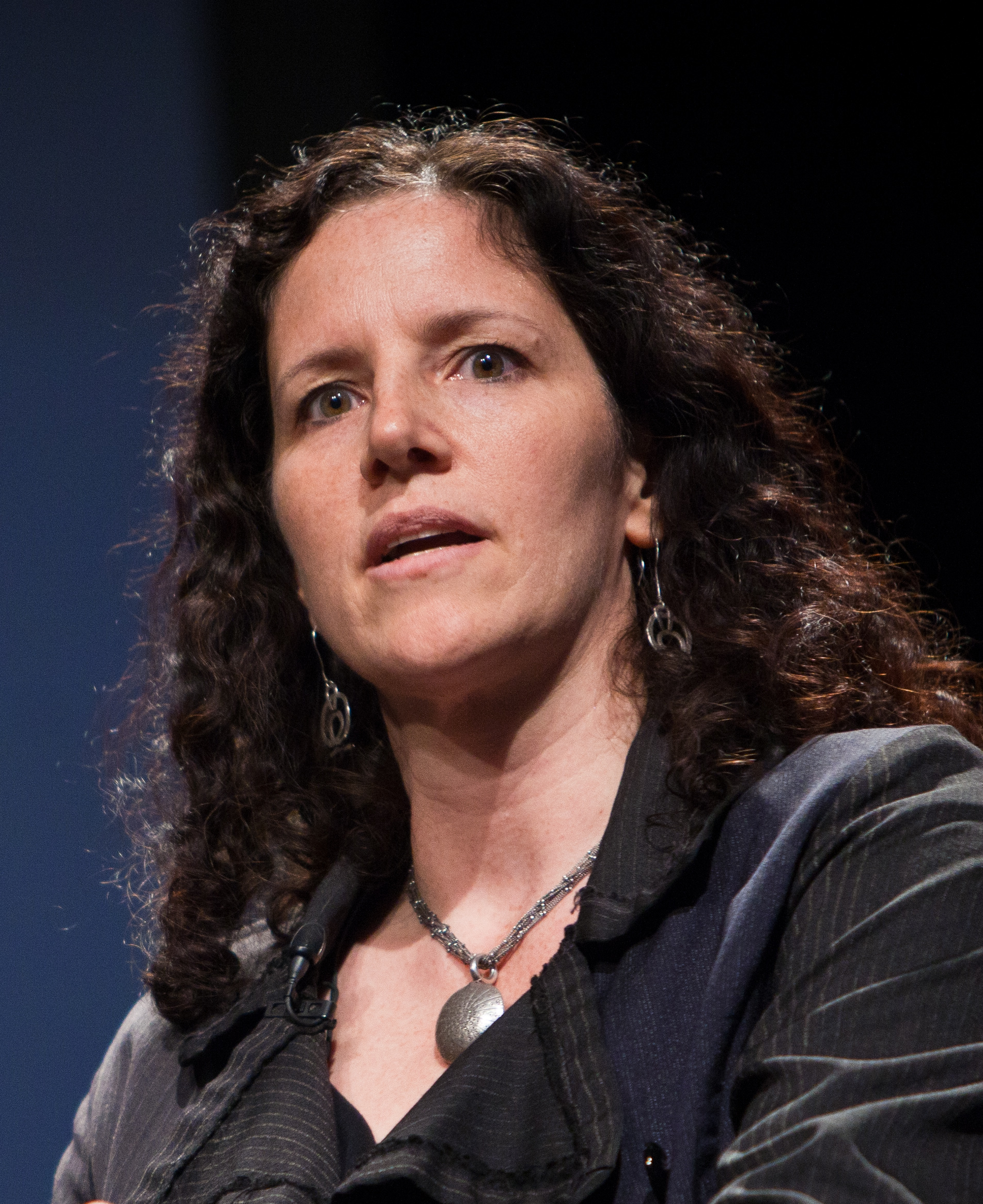
Laura Poitras, Golden Lion winner

=== In competition ===
- Golden Lion: All the Beauty and the Bloodshed by Laura Poitras
- Grand Jury Prize: Saint Omer by Alice Diop
- Silver Lion: Bones and All by Luca Guadagnino
- Volpi Cup for Best Actress: Cate Blanchett for Tár
- Volpi Cup for Best Actor: Colin Farrell for The Banshees of Inisherin
- Best Screenplay: The Banshees of Inisherin by Martin McDonagh
- Special Jury Prize: No Bears by Jafar Panahi
- Marcello Mastroianni Award: Taylor Russell for Bones and All

=== Golden Lion for Lifetime Achievement ===
- Paul Schrader
- Catherine Deneuve

=== Orizzonti ===
- Best Film: World War III by Houman Seyyedi
- Best Director: Tizza Covi and Rainer Frimmel for Vera
- Special Jury Prize: Bread and Salt by Damian Kocur
- Best Actress: Vera Gemma for Vera
- Best Actor: Mohsen Tanabandeh for World War III
- Best Screenplay: Blanquita by Fernando Guzzoni
- Best Short Film: Snow in September by Lkhagvadulam Purev-Ochir

=== Horizons Extra ===
- Audience Award: Nezouh by Soudade Kaadan

=== Lion of the Future ===
- Luigi De Laurentiis Award for a Debut Film: Saint Omer by Alice Diop

=== Venice Immersive ===
- Best Experience: The Man Who Couldn't Leave by Chen Singing
- Grand Jury Prize: From the Main Square by Pedro Harres
- Special Jury Prize: Eggscape by German Heller

== Independent Sections Awards ==
The following collateral awards were conferred to films of the autonomous sections:

=== Venice International Critics' Week ===
- Grand Prize: Eismayer by David Wagner
  - Jury special mention: Anhell69 by Theo Montoya
- The Film Club Audience award: Margini by Niccolò Falsetti
- Verona Film Club Award: Anhell69 by Theo Montoya
- Mario Serandrei: Anhell69 by Theo Montoya
- Best Short Film: Sapling by Lorenzo Fabbro and Bronte Stahl
- Best Director: Albertine Where Are You? by Maria Guidone
- Best Technical Contribution: Reginetta by Federico Russotto

=== Giornate degli Autori ===
- GdA Director's Award: Wolf and Dog by Cláudia Varejão
- Europa Cinemas Label Award: Dirty, Difficult, Dangerous by Wissam Charaf
- People Choice's Award: Blue Jean by Georgia Oakley
- BNL Gruppo BNP Paribas People's Choice Award: The Maiden by Graham Foy

== Independent Awards ==
=== Queer Lion ===
- Skin Deep by Alex Schaad

=== ARCA CinemaGiovani Award ===
- Best Film of Venezia 79: Athena by Romain Gavras
- Best Italian Film in Venice: Monica by Andrea Pallaoro

=== Authors under 40 Award ===
- Best Directing: Dogborn by Isabella Carbonell
- Best Directing: Ordinary Failures by Cristina Grosan
  - Special Mention: The Last Queen by Adila Bendimerad and Damien Ounouri
  - Special Mention: Have You Seen This Woman? by Dušan Zorić and Matija Gluščević
  - Special Mention: Blue Jean by Georgia Oakley

=== Brain Award ===
- Lord of the Ants by Gianni Amelio

=== Casa Wabi – Mantarraya Award ===
- Saint Omer by Alice Diop

=== CICT - UNESCO "Enrico Fulchignoni" Award ===
- Nuclear by Oliver Stone

=== Cinema & Arts Award ===
- Golden Musa: Music for Black Pigeons by Jørgen Leth and Andreas Koefoed
- Golden Musa: Saint Omer by Alice Diop

=== Premio CinemaSarà ===
- The Whale by Darren Aronofsky
  - Special Mention: No Bears by Jafar Panahi

=== Edipo Re Award ===
- Saint Omer by Alice Diop

=== Premio Fondazione Fai Persona Lavoro Ambiente ===
- The Sitting Duck by Jean-Paul Salomé
  - Special Mention: Princess by Roberto De Paolis (treatment of issues related to environment)
  - Special Mention: Hanging Gardens by Ahmed Yassin Al Daradji (treatment of issues related to work)

=== Fanheart3 Award ===
- Graffetta d'Oro for Best Film: Don't Worry Darling by Olivia Wilde
- Nave d'Argento for Best OTP: to the characters Charles Eismayer and Mario Falak in Eismayer by David Wagner
- XR Fan Experience: Lustration by Ryan Griffen
- XR Special Mention: Fight Back by Celine Tricart

=== FEDIC Award ===
- Gli ultimi giorni dell'umanità by Enrico Ghezzi and Alessandro Gagliardo
  - Special Mention for Best Film: Burning Hearts by Pippo Mezzapesa
  - Special Mention for Best Short Film: Albertine Where Are You? by Maria Guidone

=== FIPRESCI Awards ===
- Best Film (main competition): Argentina, 1985 by Santiago Mitre
- Best Film (other sections): Autobiography by Makbul Mubarak

=== Francesco Pasinetti Award ===
- Dry by Paolo Virzì

=== Green Drop Award ===
- White Noise by Noah Baumbach
  - Special Mention: Dry by Paolo Virzì

=== 10th INTERFILM Award for Promoting Interreligious Dialogue ===
- The Whale by Darren Aronofsky

=== Lanterna Magica Award ===
- Nezouh by Soudade Kaadan

=== Leoncino d'Oro Award ===
- The Whale by Darren Aronofsky
  - Cinema for UNICEF: Athena by Romain Gavras

=== Lizzani Award ===
- Chiara by Susanna Nicchiarelli
  - Special Mention: A Guerra Finita by Simone Massi

=== NUOVOIMAIE Talent Awards ===
- Best New Young Actor: Leonardo Maltese for Lord of the Ants
- Best New Young Actress: Margherita Mazzucco for Chiara

=== La Pellicola d'Oro Award ===
- Best Production Director: Barbara Busso for Lord of the Ants
- Best Camera Operator: Cesare Pascarella for Lord of the Ants
- Best Costume Tailoring: Laura Montaldi for Chiara

=== RB Casting Award ===
- Leonardo Maltese for Lord of the Ants

=== SIGNIS Award ===
- Chiara by Susanna Nicchiarelli
  - Special Mention: Argentina, 1985 by Santiago Mitre

=== Smithers Foundation Award "Ambassador of Hope" ===
- All the Beauty and the Bloodshed by Laura Poitras

=== “Sorriso Diverso Venezia Award” XI edition ===
- Best Italian Film: Chiara by Susanna Nicchiarelli
- Best Foreign Film: The Whale by Darren Aronofsky

=== Premio Soundtrack Stars Award ===
- Best Soundtrack: Dry, soundtrack by Franco Piersanti
- Lifetime Achievement Award: Stefano Bollani
  - Special Mention: Sergio Leone: The Italian Who Invented America, soundtrack by Rodrigo D'Erasmo

=== Premio UNIMED ===
- Bardo, False Chronicle of a Handful of Truths by Alejandro González Iñárritu
