= The Loneliest Man in Town =

2026 Austrian drama

- German: Wiener Blues – The Loneliest Man in Town
- Directed by: Tizza Covi; Rainer Frimmel
- Written by: Tizza Covi
- Produced by: Tizza Covi; Rainer Frimmel
- Starring: Alois Koch; Brigitte Meduna; Alfred Blechinger; Flurina Schneider
- Cinematography: Rainer Frimmel
- Edited by: Tizza Covi; Emily Artmann
- Music by: Al Cook
- Production companies: Filmfonds Wien; OFI+; ORF Film/Fernseh-Abkommen; Vento Film; Österreichisches Filminstitut
- Distributed by: Be For Films
- Release date: 19 February 2026 (Berlinale)
- Running time: 86 minutes
- Country: Austria
- Language: German

The Loneliest Man in Town (German: Wiener Blues – The Loneliest Man in Town) is a 2026 Austrian docufiction drama film produced and directed by Tizza Covi and Rainer Frimmel, and written by Covi. Set in Vienna, it blends fiction and reality as blues musician Al Cook plays a version of himself in a story about memory, loss and resistance to erasure.

The film had its world premiere at the main competition of the 76th Berlin International Film Festival on 19 February 2026, where it was nominated for the Golden Bear.

== Premise ==
An aging blues musician's fragile, memory-filled life is upended when developers target his home for demolition, forcing him to confront both material loss and emotional erasure.

== Cast ==
- Alois Koch as Al Cook
- Brigitte Meduna as Brigitte
- Alfred Blechinger as Fredi
- Flurina Schneider as The student

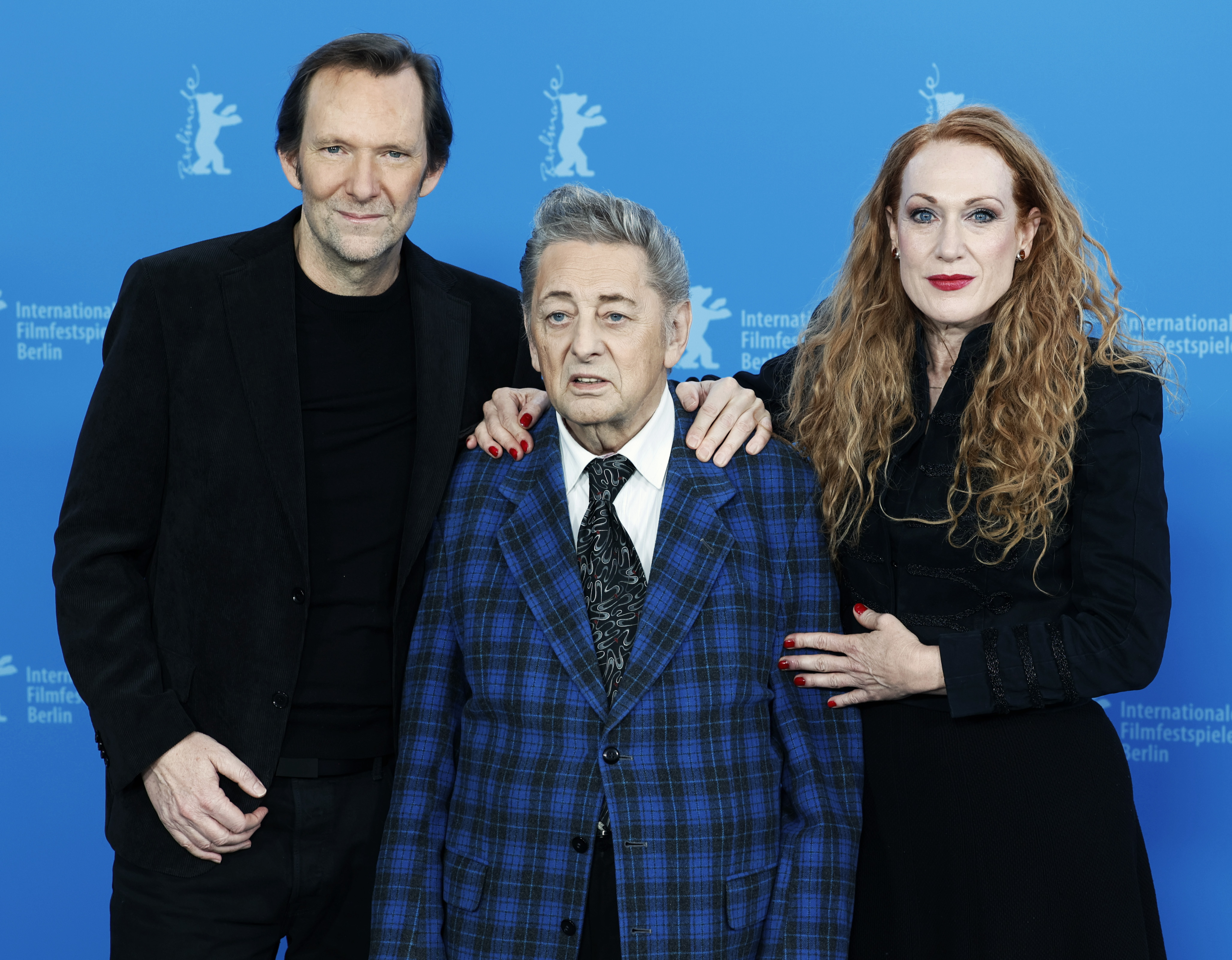
Rainer Frimmel, Alois Koch and Tizza Covi at the 76th Berlin International Film Festival

== Production ==
The Loneliest Man in Town continues duo directors Covi and Frimmel's signature approach of working with non-professional actors and naturalistic settings. The duo produced the film through their banner Vento Film. Co-producers include Österreichisches Filminstitut, OFI+, Filmfonds Wien and ORF (Film/Fernseh-Abkommen).

Frimmel also served as director of photography, shooting the film in 16 mm film.

== Release ==
The film had its world premiere at the main competition of the 76th Berlin International Film Festival on 19 February 2026. It will have its North American premiere in the Main Slate of the 2026 New York Film Festival.

Worldwide sales are handled by Brussels-based Be For Films, reuniting with the directors after Mister Universo and Vera.
