= Alapont Group =

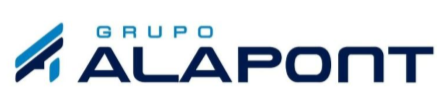
- Type: Ltd.
- Industry: Elevation and logistics
- Founded: 1954
- Founder: José Alapont Bonet
- Headquarters: Alzira
- Products: Elevators, escalators, loading docks
- Website: https://grupo.alapont.com

Alapont Group is a Spanish business group mainly dedicated to designing, manufacturing and installation of all types of engineering projects for lifting systems. Its headquarters are located in Alzira (Valencia). It also has offices in Madrid, Paris, Marseille, Toulouse, Alicante, Murcia, Castellón, Tarragona and distributors throughout the Spanish, French and Algerian territory.

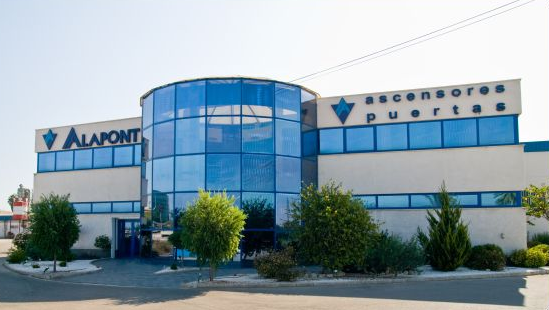
Alapont headquarters, Alzira

== History ==
Alapont was founded as an electro-mechanical workshop in 1954 by Maria Bonet Matéu and Jose Alapont Bonet. In 1967, Alapont expands its activity thanks to their son, Jose Alapont Bonet, with the founding of the division of lifts and in 1987 it was established as a private limited company. Throughout 2009 Alapont carried out the purchase of patents and trade marks of Tornymark SA, company specialized in manufacturing loading docks. In 2010, the group acquired the division of elevators and escalators of the French company CNIM, listed on the second market of the Paris Bourse. As a result of that, the agencies Toulouse, Marseille, Rennes and Paris are fully acquired. Then it is formed its new subsidiary, Alapont France, in order to strengthen in the escalators market.
