= List of submissions to the 50th Academy Awards for Best Foreign Language Film =

1977 Best Foreign Language Film submissions

Highlights
- Oscar winner: (France) Madame Rosa
- Submissions: 24
- Debuts: 3

This is a list of submissions to the 50th Academy Awards for Best Foreign Language Film. The Academy Award for Best Foreign Language Film was created in 1956 by the Academy of Motion Picture Arts and Sciences to honour non-English-speaking films produced outside the United States. The award is handed out annually, and is accepted by the winning film's director, although it is considered an award for the submitting country as a whole. Countries are invited by the Academy to submit their best films for competition according to strict rules, with only one film being accepted from each country.

For the 50th Academy Awards, twenty-four films were submitted in the category Academy Award for Best Foreign Language Film. Iran, Morocco and Venezuela entered the competition for the first time. The five nominated films came from France, Greece, Israel, Italy and Spain.

France won for the tenth time with Madame Rosa by Moshé Mizrahi.

== Submissions ==
| Submitting country | Film title used in nomination | Original title | Language(s) | Director(s) | Result |
|---|---|---|---|---|---|
| Argentina | What Does Fall Mean? | ¿Qué es el otoño? | Spanish | Daniel Portela and David José Kohon | Not nominated |
| Austria | I Want to Live | Ich will leben | German | Jörg A. Eggers | Not nominated |
| Belgium | Rubens | Rubens, schilder en diplomaat | Dutch | Roland Verhavert | Not nominated |
| Brazil | Tent of Miracles | Tenda dos Milagres | Brazilian Portuguese | Nelson Pereira dos Santos | Not nominated |
| Canada | J.A. Martin Photographer | J.A. Martin photographe | French | Jean Beaudin | Not nominated |
| Denmark | Boys | Drenge | Danish | Nils Malmros | Not nominated |
| France | Madame Rosa | La Vie devant soi | French | Moshé Mizrahi | Won Academy Award |
| East Germany | Mom, I Am Alive | Mama, ich lebe | German | Konrad Wolf | Not nominated |
| West Germany | The American Friend | Der Amerikanische Freund | German, English, French | Wim Wenders | Not nominated |
| Greece | Iphigenia | Ἰφιγένεια | Greek | Michael Cacoyannis | Nominated |
| Hungary | A Strange Role | Herkulesfürdöi emlék | Hungarian | Pál Sándor | Not nominated |
| India | Manthan | मंथन | Hindi | Shyam Benegal | Not nominated |
| Iran | The Cycle | دايره مينا | Persian | Dariush Mehrjui | Not nominated |
| Israel | Operation Thunderbolt | מבצע יונתן | Hebrew, English, Arabic, German, French, Spanish | Menahem Golan | Nominated |
| Italy | A Special Day | Una giornata particolare | Italian | Ettore Scola | Nominated |
| Japan | Mt. Hakkoda | 八甲田山 | Japanese | Shiro Moritani | Not nominated |
| Mexico | Pafnucio Santo | | Spanish | Rafael Corkidi | Not nominated |
| Morocco | Blood Wedding | Noces de sang | French | Souheil Ben-Barka | Not nominated |
| Netherlands | Soldier of Orange | Soldaat van Oranje | Dutch, English, German | Paul Verhoeven | Not nominated |
| Poland | Camouflage | Barwy ochronne | Polish | Krzysztof Zanussi | Not nominated |
| Soviet Union | The Ascent | Восхождение | Russian | Larisa Shepitko | Not nominated |
| Spain | That Obscure Object of Desire | Cet obscur objet du désir, Ese oscuro objeto del deseo | French, Spanish | Luis Buñuel | Nominated |
| Sweden | The Man on the Roof | Mannen på taket | Swedish | Bo Widerberg | Not nominated |
| Venezuela | The Fish That Smokes | El pez que fuma | Spanish | Román Chalbaud | Not nominated |

== Sources ==
- Margaret Herrick Library, Academy of Motion Picture Arts and Sciences
