= List of submissions to the 42nd Academy Awards for Best Foreign Language Film =

1969 Best Foreign Language Film submissions

Highlights
- Oscar winner: (Algeria) Z
- Submissions: 24
- Debuts: 1

This is a list of submissions to the 42nd Academy Awards for Best Foreign Language Film. The Academy Award for Best Foreign Language Film was created in 1956 by the Academy of Motion Picture Arts and Sciences to honour non-English-speaking films produced outside the United States. The award is handed out annually, and is accepted by the winning film's director, although it is considered an award for the submitting country as a whole. Countries are invited by the Academy to submit their best films for competition according to strict rules, with only one film being accepted from each country.

For the 42nd Academy Awards, twenty-four films were submitted in the category Academy Award for Best Foreign Language Film. The five nominees came from Algeria, France, Sweden, the Soviet Union and Yugoslavia. Algeria, submitting a film for the first time, became the first African country to receive an Oscar nomination in this category.

Algeria won with Z by Costa-Gavras, which also won Best Film Editing, alongside nominations for Best Picture, Best Director and Best Adapted Screenplay. Becoming the first African film to win this category.

== Submissions ==
Submitting country	Film title used in nomination	Original title	Language(s)	Director(s)	Result
Algeria	Z		French, Russian, English	Costa-Gavras	Won Academy Award
Austria	Moss on the Stones	Moos auf den Steinen	German	Georg Lhotsky	Not nominated
Belgium	Palaver		Swahili, Dutch, French, English, German, Latin	Emile Degelin	Not nominated
Brazil	Antonio das Mortes	O Dragão da Maldade Contra o Santo Guerreiro	Brazilian Portuguese	Glauber Rocha	Not nominated
Czechoslovakia	The Cremator	Spalovač mrtvol	Czech, Hebrew	Juraj Herz	Not nominated
Denmark	Ballad of Carl-Henning	Balladen om Carl-Henning	Danish	Lene Grønlykke and Sven Grønlykke	Not nominated
France	My Night at Maud's	Ma Nuit Chez Maud	French	Éric Rohmer	Nominated
West Germany	Hunting Scenes from Bavaria	Jagdszenen aus Niederbayern	German	Peter Fleischmann	Not nominated
Greece	Girls in the Sun	Κοριτσια στον Ηλιο	Greek	Vasilis Georgiadis	Not nominated
Hong Kong	The Arch	董夫人	Mandarin	Tang Shu Shuen	Not nominated
Hungary	The Upthrown Stone	Feldobott kő	Hungarian	Sándor Sára	Not nominated
India	Deiva Magan	தெய்வ மகன்	Tamil	A. C. Tirulokchandar	Not nominated
Israel	Siege/Matzor	מצור	Hebrew	Gilberto Tofano	Not nominated
Italy	Fellini Satyricon		Italian, Latin	Federico Fellini	Not nominated
Japan	Kuragejima, Legends From a Southern Island	神々の深き欲望	Japanese	Shōhei Imamura	Not nominated
Netherlands	Monsieur Hawarden		Dutch	Harry Kümel	Not nominated
Peru	The Green Wall	La muralla verde	Spanish	Armando Robles Godoy	Not nominated
Poland	Everything for Sale	Wszystko na Sprzedaż	Polish	Andrzej Wajda	Not nominated
Romania	A Woman for a Season	Răutăciosul adolescent	Romanian	Gheorghe Vitanidis	Not nominated
South Korea	The Old Jar Craftsman	독짓는 늙은이	Korean	Choi Ha-won	Not nominated
Soviet Union	The Brothers Karamazov	Братья Карамазовы	Russian	Kirill Lavrov, Ivan Pyryev and Mikhail Ulyanov	Nominated
Spain	La Celestina		Spanish	César Fernández Ardavín	Not nominated
Sweden	Ådalen 31		Swedish	Bo Widerberg	Nominated
Yugoslavia	Battle of Neretva	Bitka na Neretvi	Serbo-Croatian	Veljko Bulajić	Nominated

== Sources ==
- Margaret Herrick Library, Academy of Motion Picture Arts and Sciences
