= Juan García del Muro =

Spanish philosopher, professor and essayist

- Joan García del Muro
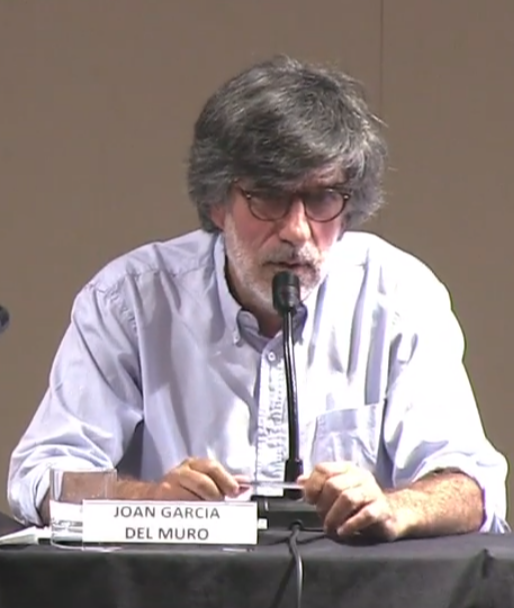
- Born: 1961 (age 64–65); Lérida, Spain
- Education: University of Barcelona
- Occupations: Philosopher, professor & essayist

Juan García del Muro Solans (Catalan: Joan García del Muro; born 1961) is a Spanish philosopher, essayist and university professor. He is one of the most awarded essayists in the Catalan language. He is the author of over 10 books, including Ficcions còmplices ("Accomplice Fictions", 2004) and Good bye, veritat ("Good Bye, Truth", 2018).

He won the Joan Fuster Award for Essay in 2003 for his book Ficcions còmplices, an analysis of the current totalitarianisms that have arisen not from the fanaticism of those who believe too much, but from the nihilism of those who do not believe in anything. In García's opinion these are nothing but new ways of acting, nominally democratic but reproducing the old repressive schemes too faithfully. The essay pays special attention to those born after the September 11 attacks.

== Works ==
- Ser y conocer, ("To Be, and to Know"). Barcelona, PPU (1994).
- Història de la Filosofia, ("History of Philosophy"). Lleida, Granica (1997).
- El pensament ferit, ("The Injured Thinking", Mancomunitat de la Ribera Alta Award for Essay, 1999. Alzira: Edicions Bromera, 2001.
- Totalitarisme postmodern ("Postmodern Totalitarianism"), Ernest Lluch Award for Culture and Human Rights, 2001)
- Ficcions Còmplices ("Accomplice Fictions"), Joan Fuster Award for Essay, 2003. Valencia, Edicions Tres i Quatre (2004).
- El pensament creacionista en les tres religions monoteistes ("The Creationist Thinking in the Three Monotheistic Religions"). Barcelona, Edicions de la Universitat Ramon Llull (2004).
- Com ens enganyem. La ceguesa voluntària en les societats contemporànies ("How We Deveive Ourselves. Voluntary Blindness in Contemporary Societies") (VIII Mancomunitat de la Ribera Alta Award), Alzira: Bromera (2007).
- Menú del dia: carn de canó - Set estudis sobre metafísica del consumisme ("Menu of the Day: Fodder - Seven Studies on Metaphysics of Consumerism") Andorra's National Award for Assaig, Sant Miquel d'Engolasters. Lleida: Pagès Editors (2010).
- La generació easy o de l'educació en l'era del buit ("Generation "Easy", or Education in the Era of Emptiness") (Joan Profitós Award for Pedagogic Essay, 2003).
- Santo Tomás de Aquino ("Thomas Aquinas"). Barcelona, RBA (2016).
- Pensar el Totalitarisme ("Thinking about Totalitarianism"). Barcelona, MiniOps, Institut Obert de Catalunya. (2016).
- Soldats del no-res ("Soldier of Nothingness"), (Joan Fuster Award for Assay, 2016). Valencia. Edicions Tres i Quatre (2017).
- Good bye, veritat ("Good Bye, Truth"). Josep Vallverdú Award, 2017. Lérida, Pagès Editors (2018).
- Veritat, postveritat i "fake news" (2020) Pagès Editors, Lleida. (coauthor, with Carlos Miguel Ruiz Caballero and Francesc Torralba Roselló). ISBN 978-8413032016
- Els convidats de pedra, (2025) Eumo Editorial.
