= Varejão =

Varejão is a Portuguese surname. Notable people with the surname include:

- Adriana Varejão (born 1964), Brazilian artist
- Anderson Varejão (born 1982), Brazilian basketball player
- Cláudia Varejão (born 1980), Portuguese filmmaker
- Sandro Varejão (born 1972), Brazilian basketball player
