= Dirty Difficult Dangerous =

- Directed by: Wissam Charaf
- Written by: Wissam Charaf; Mariette Désert; Hala Dabaji
- Produced by: Charlotte Vincent; Katia Khazak
- Starring: Clara Couturet; Ziad Jallad
- Cinematography: Martin Rit
- Edited by: Clémence Diard
- Music by: Zeid Hamdan
- Production company: Aurora Films
- Release date: 2022
- Running time: 83 minutes
- Countries: France; Italy; Lebanon

Dirty Difficult Dangerous (Arabic: حديد، نحاس، بطّاريات )is a 2022 film directed by Wissam Charaf which premiered in the 2022 Venice Days, a sidebar of the 79th Venice International Film Festival, and won the 2022 Europa Cinemas Label award.

== Cast and crew ==
The film stars actor Ziad Jallad as a Syrian refugee named Ahmed and actress Clara Couturet as an Ethiopian named Medhia. The two were chosen in part because they were attractive despite the characters' marginal roles in society. In an interview with Arab News, Charaf said, "I wanted to assert that because you're poor or a refugee doesn't mean you're necessarily going to be ugly or (look exhausted). I got the most handsome refugee and the most beautiful housemaid in the world."

It was produced by Charlotte Vincent and Katia Khazak, with Marco Valerio Fusco, Micaela Fusco and Pierre Saraf as co-producers.

== Plot ==
Set in Beirut, the film tells the story of a Syrian refugee named Ahmed and an Ethiopian woman named Mehdia who works as a housemaid who are in love. Mehdia tries to free herself from her employers, an elderly couple, while Ahmed struggles to survive by selling scrap metal.

Mehdia is at home alone with 'Mister' (Ibrahim), the sick husband whose care she is responsible for when she receives an offer to enter a prize lottery for a night at a hotel for answering 3 questions. She answers the questions correctly and later wins the lottery. She is tormented by the senile husband who sometimes attacks her in fits of cognitive confusion. His wife, 'Leila' cares for the injury, but is seemingly more worried about their reputation, being perceived as abusive employers. Leila doesn't allow Mehdia to return to Ethiopia to visit her family.

Ahmed is affected by a mysterious disease, which causes metal to appear out of his body. Ahmed and Mehdia have a signal, where Ahmed shouts "iron, copper, batteries" to meet up secretly with Mehdia. There is a curfew for Syrians and Ahmed is discriminated against, being refused employment as a Syrian. He is threatened and almost beaten by a mob of Lebanese men. The group of Syrian men he shares a makeshift shelter with, brush his encounter off. They attempt to make him prostitute off Mehdia, making insensitive racist "quips", to which Ahmed responds angrily.

Ibrahim sometimes share stories of his past with Mehdia while she is caring for him, though they often devolve into absurdity. Mehdia steals one of Mister's old sweaters for Ahmed.

Mehdia brings Ahmed home one day, into her room, and they are caught when it's reporting back to 'Madam' (Leila) that a man was in the house. Leila takes her to the man who has kept her passport, where Mehdia is threatened. She is stuck with her employers until she pays the 'debts' required to bring her from Ethiopia, exposing the exploitative conditions of her employment. She is forbidden from seeing Ahmed again. The man suggest hiring Bengalis or Sri Lankans to Leila. Mehdia prays for her family and Ahmed often.

A Bangladeshi girl, 'Kookoo' is hired and they both cry, Mehdia fearing she will be fired, and Kookoo in confusion and fear at the new circumstances. Kookoo doesn't speak Arabic. Ibrahim chokes Kookoo in her sleep, Mehdia saves and comforts her.

Mehdia escapes her employers' house and meets up with Ahmed, though she injures her ankle during the escape. Together, they spend a night at the hotel that Mehdia won. Then they travel to the Syria-Lebanon border and meet Ahmed's mom.

Leila gets treated for her ankle at a hospital where there are European journalists. Ahmed lies to them, is offered money for an interview, and Leila tells her story, which Ahmed translates incorrectly. He asks Mehdia to forgive him and hugs her.

Ahmed works odd jobs for meager pay, and the employer insults Mehdia, suggesting Ahmed "sells his Sri Lankan". Mehdia is offended by the racist remarks.

Ahmed tries to sell his kidney, but is unable. The doctor does an X-ray and finds his body is full of metal and "his heart is trapped in a cage". His hand has turned fully metal and he has super strength. They go see someone Ahmed's friend recommended to get papers to leave the country. Mehdia stays with her Ethiopian friends, but Ahmed isn't allowed due to the landlord.

Mehdia goes to their spot to find Ahmed, his arm has fully turned metal. They find a ship and walk to it, Ahmed's arm falls off, he picks it up, and Mehdia continues supporting him as they walk towards the ship.
