= Margherita Mazzucco =

Italian actress

- Born: Naples, Italy
- Occupation: Actress
- Years active: 2018–present

Margherita Mazzucco is an Italian actress. She is best known for her role as Elena "Lenù" Greco in the HBO coming-of-age television series My Brilliant Friend.

== Biography ==
Margherita Mazzucco grew up in Naples, she is the third of four sisters. Her father is a lawyer. She graduated from a liceo classico, and later studied modern literature at the University of Naples Federico II.

Her acting career came "by accident"; auditions for My Brilliant Friend were being held in her school, and she participated out of curiosity. She wanted to play Lila initially, however, director Saverio Costanzo eventually convinced her to play Lenù. She had no prior acting experience when she accepted the role.

== Filmography ==
=== Film ===
Year	Title	Role	Ref.
2022	Chiara	Clare of Assisi	

=== Television ===
Year	Title	Role	Notes	Ref.
2018-22	My Brilliant Friend	Elena "Lenù" Greco	22 episodes	

== Awards and nominations ==
Year	Award	Category	Work	Result	Ref.
2022	Venice International Film Festival	NUOVOIMAIE Best New Young Actress	Chiara	Won	
