= Vera (2022 film) =

- Promotional release poster
- Directed by: Tizza Covi; Rainer Frimmel
- Written by: Tizza Covi
- Produced by: Tizza Covi; Rainer Frimmel
- Starring: Vera Gemma
- Cinematography: Rainer Frimmel
- Edited by: Tizza Covi
- Music by: Florian Benzer; Michael Pogo Kreiner
- Production company: Vento Film
- Release date: 2022
- Countries: Austria; Italy
- Language: Italian

Vera is a 2022 Austrian-Italian docudrama film directed and produced by Tizza Covi and Rainer Frimmel. It stars Vera Gemma playing a semi-fictionalized version of herself.

The film was selected in the Horizons section at the 79th edition of the Venice Film Festival, winning the awards for Best Director and Best Actress. It was selected as the Austrian entry for the Best International Feature Film at the 96th Academy Awards.

== Plot ==
Vera, the daughter of spaghetti Western star Giuliano Gemma, spends a lavish and superficial life in the shadow of her father. Her life has an unexpected turning point after injuring a child in a car accident.

== Cast ==
- Vera Gemma as Vera
- Giuliana Gemma as Giuli
- Asia Argento as Asia
- Alessandra Di Sanzo as Alessandra
- Daniel De Palma as Daniel
- Sebastian Dascalu as Manuel
- Gennaro Lilio as Gennaro
- Annamaria Ciancamerla as grandmother
- Ivan Bellavista as director of the audition

== See also ==
- Scarlet Diva
