= Selen (actress) =

Italian actress and television personality (born 1966)

- Born: Luce Caponegro; 17 December 1966 (age 59); Rome, Italy
- Other names: Selen
- Occupations: Actress, television presenter, former pornographic actress
- Years active: 1986–present
- Height: 1.62 m (5 ft 4 in)

Luce Caponegro (born December 17, 1966), also known by her stage name Selen, is an Italian actress, television presenter, director, and former pornographic actress.

== Early life ==
Caponegro's father was an Italian industrialist active in the petroleum industry. As a child, she attended courses in singing, classical dance, and horseback riding. After leaving home, she married at the age of 18 and lived in a commune without running water or a heating system until she was 20.

== Adult film career ==
In her early twenties, she entered the adult video industry with her first pornographic film, Orgia di natale, directed by Cesare Geromini.

Her breakthrough came in 1993, at the age of 27, when director Alex Perry offered her a role in the film Signore Scandalose di Provincia. It was around this time that she adopted the stage name Selen.

She has been called "Italy's favorite porn star." She made appearances at the Hot d'Or pornographic festival in Cannes and at Erotica in Turin, winning 17 prizes during her career as a pornographic actress from 1993 to 1999.

Her last hardcore scenes were released in 2000 with the film Millennium. Although her last sex scene was filmed in 1999, she continued to appear in films as clips from her previous work were used in later hardcore films.

She has stated that she would not return to pornography.

=== Directors ===
Selen starred in films by well-known Italian porn directors such as Mario Salieri (Dracula, Sceneggiata napoletana, Concetta Licata), Silvio Bandinelli (Il rosso e il nero, Cuore di pietra), and Joe D'Amato (Selvaggia, Sahara, Selen regina degli elefanti). She played the title role in Cindy, directed by Luca Damiano.

== Film and television career ==
Caponegro has presented the music programme "Hot." She has made appearances in radio, hosting the show Lezioni di Sesso (Sex Lessons). Caponegro has also made appearances in theatre and advertisements. In 2004, she starred in the reality show La Fattoria. She has also appeared in Maurizio Costanzo Show, Uno Mattina, Domenica In, I Fatti Vostri and Omnibus. Caponegro had a part in Asia Argento's 2000 film Scarlet Diva, which won the Williamsburg Brooklyn Film Festival Award for Best New Director.

== Personal life ==
Caponegro lived in coastal Romagna. She has two sons, the first of whom, Kangi, was born in 1988 during her marriage with Fabio Albonetti, which has since ended in divorce. Her second son, Gabriele, was born in 2006 with her ex-partner Nicola Zanon. In 2006, she graduated from school and expressed a desire to enroll at a university.
