= I Want to Live (1976 film) =

1976 film

- Directed by: Jörg A. Eggers
- Written by: Jörg A. Eggers
- Produced by: Jörg A. Eggers
- Starring: Kathina Kaiser
- Cinematography: Walter Kindler
- Release date: 1976
- Running time: 98 minutes
- Country: Austria
- Language: German

I Want to Live (German: Ich will leben) is a 1976 Austrian drama film directed by Jörg A. Eggers. The film was selected as the Austrian entry for the Best Foreign Language Film at the 50th Academy Awards, but was not accepted as a nominee.

== Cast ==
- Kathina Kaiser as Antonia Mach
- Heinz Bennent as Prof. Wolfgang Mach
- Sonja Sutter as Lucille
- Alwy Becker as Gerlinde Schneiderhahn
- Signe Seidel as Astrid Preisach
- Claudia Butenuth as Eva Vrzal
- Elisabeth Epp as Frau Sandner, Antonias Mutter
- Gertrud Roll as Liesl
- Sylvia Eisenberger as Marianne
- Klaus Barner as Prof. Reiner
- Josef Fröhlich as Vrzal, Oberarzt im Unfallkrankenhaus
- Georg Lhotzky as Georg, TV-Regisseur

== See also ==
- List of submissions to the 50th Academy Awards for Best Foreign Language Film
- List of Austrian submissions for the Academy Award for Best Foreign Language Film
