= Matzor =

- Original film poster
- מצור
- Directed by: Gilberto Tofano
- Written by: Dahn Ben Amotz; Gilberto Tofano
- Produced by: Ya'ackov Agmon; Michael J. Kagan
- Starring: Eran Agmon
- Cinematography: David Gurfinkel
- Edited by: Danny Shick
- Release date: 1969
- Running time: 100 minutes
- Country: Israel
- Language: Hebrew

Matzor (Hebrew: מצור, translit. Siege) is a 1969 Israeli film directed and co-written by Italian director Gilberto Tofano. It involves the theme of a widowed mother (actress Gila Almagor), her lover (actor Dahn Ben Amotz) and her ex-husband's friend (actor Yehoram Gaon). It was entered into the 1969 Cannes Film Festival. The film was also selected as the Israeli entry for the Best Foreign Language Film at the 42nd Academy Awards, but was not accepted as a nominee.

== Cast ==
- Eran Agmon
- Gila Almagor as Tamar
- Yael Aviv
- Dahn Ben Amotz
- Yehoram Gaon as Eli
- Omna Goldstein
- Anni Grian
- Micha Kagan
- Raviv Oren
- Amir Orion
- Baruch Sadeh
- Uri Sharoni

== Reception ==
In 1975, Emanuel Bar-Kedma, film critic at Yedioth Ahronoth, described the film as "the social, psychological study of a war widow within such a study of the general country's mood throughout the War of Attrition.

== Themes ==
Fiammetta Martegani, an Italian-Israeli anthropologist has identified the film as belonging to the "heroic-nationalist" genre. However, it is the first in the genre to have a female protagonist rather than a heroic male and to focus its attention on themes such as family and intimacy.

According to Maretgani, the film position Israel as first and foremost a Western country and one that shares the ideals of Western individualism. Likewise, Nitzan Ben Shaul, a director and academic has argued that the film "progressively, formally and thematically shifts its initial concept of war as siege and the collective social paradigm as is necessary, to a conception of war as part of an international struggle between east and west. This is correlated with an emerging individualistic western oriented paradidm."

== See also ==
- List of submissions to the 42nd Academy Awards for Best Foreign Language Film
- List of Israeli submissions for the Academy Award for Best Foreign Language Film
