= Elisa Ramírez =

Spanish actress (1943–2026)

- Born: 2 December 1943; Alzira, Spain
- Died: 10 November 2026 (aged 82); Valencia, Spain
- Other name: Elisa Ramírez Sanz
- Occupation: Actress
- Years active: 1963–2026

Elisa Ramírez (2 December 1943 – 10 November 2026) was a Spanish actress.

== Biography ==
Ramírez was born in Alzira, Valencia, on 2 December 1943.

She died in Valencia on 10 November 2026, at the age of 82.

== Selected filmography ==
- Another's Wife (1967)
- The Wanton of Spain (1969)
- The Troublemaker (1969)
- La Celestina (1969)
- The Man Who Wanted to Kill Himself (1970)
- Man with the Golden Winchester (1973)

== Bibliography ==
- Goble, Alan. The Complete Index to Literary Sources in Film. Walter de Gruyter, 1999.
