= Moss on the Stones =

1968 film

- Directed by: Georg Lhotsky
- Written by: Gerhard Fritsch (novel); Gheorg Lhotzky
- Produced by: Wolfgang Odelga
- Starring: Fritz Muliar
- Release date: 1968
- Running time: 82 minutes
- Country: Austria
- Language: German

Moss on the Stones (German: Moos auf den Steinen) is a 1968 Austrian drama film directed by Georg Lhotsky. The Austrian academic Robert von Dassanowsky said it was one of the most remarkable and memorable Austrian films of the 1960s. The film was selected as the Austrian entry for the Best Foreign Language Film at the 42nd Academy Awards, but was not accepted as a nominee.

== Cast ==
- Fritz Muliar as The Architect
- Erika Pluhar as Julia
- Louis Ries as Mehlmann
- Johannes Schauer as Karl
- Heinz Trixner as Petrik
- Wilfried Zeller-Zellenberg as The Baron

== See also ==
- List of submissions to the 42nd Academy Awards for Best Foreign Language Film
- List of Austrian submissions for the Academy Award for Best Foreign Language Film
