= La Pivellina =

2009 film

- La Pivellina movie poster
- Directed by: Tizza Covi and Rainer Frimmel
- Written by: Tizza Covi
- Produced by: Rainer Frimmel
- Starring: Patrizia Gerardi; Walter Saabel; Asia Crippa; Tairo Caroli
- Cinematography: Rainer Frimmel
- Edited by: Tizza Covi
- Distributed by: Films Distribution
- Release dates: 19 May 2009 (Cannes); 13 November 2009 (Austria)
- Running time: 100 minutes
- Country: Austria
- Language: Italian

La Pivellina (The Little One) is a 2009 Austrian feature film debut directed by Tizza Covi and Rainer Frimmel. The film premiered at the 2009 Cannes Film Festival in the Directors' Fortnight, where it has been awarded the Europa Cinemas Label as Best European Film.

== Plot ==
Abandoned in a park, the two-year-old girl Asia is found by Patty, a circus woman living with her husband Walter in a trailer park in San Basilio on the outskirts of Rome. With the help of Tairo, a teenager who lives with his grandma in an adjacent container, Patti gives the girl a new home for an uncertain period of time. However, Walter is concerned that they may be accused of kidnapping the girl, and he plans to report Asia's presence to the police.

Patty receives a letter from the mother in which she announces that she will collect the girl two days later. They have a farewell party, but the mother does not show up.

== Cast ==
- Patrizia Gerardi as Patty
- Walter Saabel as Walter
- Asia Crippa as Asia
- Tairo Caroli as Tairo

== Release ==
La Pivellina has been screened in more than 130 International Film Festivals (including Berlinale, Toronto, Karlovy Vary, New York, San Francisco, Palm Springs) and received over 35 awards. La Pivellina is being released in more than 20 countries worldwide (including USA, Argentina, France, Italy, Brazil, Germany). The film was selected as the Austrian entry for the Best Foreign Language Film at the 83rd Academy Awards, but it didn't make the final shortlist.

== Awards (selection) ==
- 2009 may, Festival International du Film de Cannes

Prix Europa Cinemas Label - Best European Film

- 2009 June, Pesaro Film Festival

Premio "Lino Miccichè" - Best Feature Film

- 2009 aug, International Film Summerfest Durres

Golden Gladiator for Best Feature Film

- 2009 aug, Annecy Cinéma Italien

Prix d'Interprétation Féminine (Patrizia Gerardi) - Best Actress
Prix Spécial du Jury

- 2009 oct, Kyiv International Film Festival Molodist

Ecumenical Jury Prize
Grand Prix "Scythian Deer" for Best Feature Film
Yves Montand Prize for Best Acting (Patrizia Gerardi)

- 2009 oct, Mumbai International Film Festival

Jury Grand Prize

- 2009 oct, Valdivia International Film Festival

Mejor Película - Best Feature Film
Premió de Público - Audience Award

- 2009 nov, Leeds International Film Festival

Golden Owl Award for Best Feature Film

- 2009 nov, Gijón International Film Festival

Premio "Principado de Asturias" Mejor Largometraje - Best Feature Film
Premio Mejor Actriz (Patrizia Gerardi) - Best Actress

- 2009 nov, Castellininaria Festival Internazionale del Cinema Giovane Bellizona

Premio “Ambiente e Salute: Qualità di Vita”

- 2010 jan, Festival Premiers Plans d'Angers

Grand Prix for Best Feature Film
Prix Mademoiselle Ladubay Long Metrage - Best Actress (Patrizia Gerardi)

- 2010 mar, Diagonale

Grand Prix for Best Austrian Feature Film 2009/10

- 2010 apr, Indie Lisboa

Distribution Award Caixa Geral de Depósitos

- 2010 apr, Festival Cinematográfico Internacional de Uruguay

Mencione del Jurado
Mencione del Jurado FIPRESCI Uruguay

- 2010 April, Buenos Aires Festival Internacional de Cine Independiente

Premio UNICEF

- 2010 June, Nastri d'Argento:

Menzione Speciale Migliore Opera Prima

- 2010 July, Bimbi Belli Roma

Premio Miglior Film - Best Feature Film
Premio Miglior Attrice - Best Actress (Patrizia Gerardi)

- 2010 July, Gallio Film Festival

Premio del Pubblico – Audience Award
Premio Migliore Opera Prima

- 2010 aug, Sarzana Film Festival

Premio "Cineforum Sarzana" Migliore Film - Best Feature Film

== See also ==
- List of submissions to the 83rd Academy Awards for Best Foreign Language Film
- List of Austrian submissions for the Academy Award for Best Foreign Language Film

== Notes ==
1. Karin Schiefer, AFC, April 2009, Tizza Covi & Rainer Frimmel: La Pivellina - Interview
2. Natasha Senjanovic, April 27, 2010,The Hollywood Reporter
3. Bénédicte Prot, May 19, 2009, Cineuropa
4. Jon Davies, 2009, Cinemascope
5. Pablo Suárez, Buenos Aires Herald
6. Boyd Van Hoeij, May 19, 2009, Variety
7. Jason Anderson, Eye Weekly
