= Chiara (film) =

2022 film by Susanna Nicchiarelli

- Italian theatrical release poster
- Directed by: Susanna Nicchiarelli
- Written by: Susanna Nicchiarelli
- Produced by: Marta Donzelli; Gregorio Paonessa
- Starring: Margherita Mazzucco; Andrea Carpenzano; Carlotta Natoli; Paola Tiziana Cruciani; Flaminia Mancin; Valentino Campitelli; Paolo Briguglia; Giulia Testi; Luigi Vestuto; Luigi Lo Cascio
- Cinematography: Crystel Fournier
- Edited by: Stefano Cravero
- Music by: Anonima Frottolisti
- Production companies: Vivo Film; Rai Cinema; Tarantula
- Distributed by: 01 Distribution (Italy); O'Brother (Belgium)
- Release dates: 9 September 2022 (Venice); 7 December 2022 (Italy)
- Running time: 106 minutes
- Countries: Italy; Belgium
- Language: Central Italian

Chiara is a 2022 biographical historical drama film written and directed by Susanna Nicchiarelli. It follows the life of Saint Clare of Assisi, played by Margherita Mazzucco.

The film premiered in competition at the 79th Venice International Film Festival on 9 September 2022. It was released theatrically in Italy on 7 December 2022 by 01 Distribution.

== Cast ==
- Margherita Mazzucco as Chiara
- Andrea Carpenzano as Francesco
- Carlotta Natoli as Cristiana
- Paola Tiziana Cruciani as Balvina
- Flaminia Mancin as Pacifica
- Valentino Campitelli as Elia
- Paolo Briguglia as Leone
- Giulia Testi as Cecilia
- Luigi Vestuto as Pacifico
- Luigi Lo Cascio as Cardinal Ugolino, later Pope Gregory IX

== Production ==
Nicchiarelli conceived of the film during the early COVID-19 lockdowns in Italy after reading a book on Clare by historian Chiara Frugoni, who served as the script consultant for the film. According to Nicchiarelli, the dialogue is in "the Umbrian vernacular of the time". Linguist Nadia Cannata provided assistance for adapting the dialogue from modern Italian. Nicchiarelli took inspirations for the musical numbers from films such as Hair and Jesus Christ Superstar.

== Reception ==
On the review aggregator website Rotten Tomatoes, Chiara holds an approval rating of 80% based on 5 reviews, with an average rating of 6/10.

Nicholas Bell of IONCINEMA gave the film one out of five stars, writing, "While the subject matter lends itself to a necessary rigidity, Nicchiarelli only accomplishes in conveying a sense of the interminable in this ponderous exercise, attempting to enliven the production with musical numbers both distracting and cringeworthy." Sheri Linden of The Hollywood Reporter described the film as an "earnest yet playful take on Clare", adding, "Chiara wanders, in ways that can be rewarding or confounding, but it takes chances." Davide Abbatescianni of Cineuropa praised in particular Margherita Mazzucco as she "stands out in the cast on account of her seraphic and courageous portrayal of a girl and a woman who refuses to bend to her family's violence or the pressure exerted by Cardinal Ugolini."
