= Sergio Leone: The Italian Who Invented America =

- Directed by: Francesco Zippel
- Cinematography: Adriatik Berdaku
- Edited by: Christian Lombardi
- Release date: 2022
- Country: Italy

Sergio Leone: The Italian Who Invented America (Italian: Sergio Leone - L'italiano che inventò l'America) is a 2022 Italian documentary film written and directed by Francesco Zippel. It is portrait of the art and the legacy of Italian filmmaker Sergio Leone through archive footage and interviews with collaborators and artists who were influenced by his style. The film premiered in the Venice Classics section at the 79th edition of the Venice Film Festival.

== Cast ==
- Sergio Leone (archive footage)
- Dario Argento
- Darren Aronofsky
- Jacques Audiard
- Damien Chazelle
- Jennifer Connelly
- Robert De Niro
- Clint Eastwood
- Christopher Frayling
- Tsui Hark
- Arnon Milchan
- Frank Miller
- Giuliano Montaldo
- Ennio Morricone
- Martin Scorsese
- Steven Spielberg
- Quentin Tarantino
- Giuseppe Tornatore
- Carlo Verdone
- Eli Wallach (archive footage)

== Reception ==
The film won the 2023 Nastro d'Argento for Best Documentary.
