= Theo Montoya =

Colombian film director

Theo Montoya (born 1992) is a Colombian filmmaker.

== Life and career ==
Montoya was born in 1992 in Medellín, Colombia. Founder and director of DESVIO VISUAL, a production company focused on experimental film and documentary work. Anhell69 (2022), his debut feature film, an international co-production involving Colombia, Romania, France, and Germany, premiered at the 79th Venice International Film Festival, and won a Special Mention by the Grand Jury.

For over seven years, Montoya has worked with youth-led audiovisual projects in Medellín, with a focus on queer narratives, nihilism, and social realities. In 2018, he received the Colombian Cinematographic Development Fund for his short documentary Son of Sodom, the short version of his first feature. In 2024, he participated at La Résidence of the Cannes Film Festival. Afterwards, he became part of the 2026 Cannes Film Festival with his short Thunder Platoon is based on Colombia’s “false positives” scandal, where civilians, often from marginalized groups, were killed by the army and falsely presented as terrorists. It follows soldiers celebrating such an attack.

== Filmography ==
Films
Year	Title	Category
2020	Son of Sodom	Short
2022	Anhell69	Feature
2026	Thunder Platoon	Short
