= Nezouh =

2022 British film

- Directed by: Soudade Kaadan
- Written by: Soudade Kaadan
- Produced by: Soudade Kaadan; Yu-Fai Suen; Marc Bordure
- Starring: Hala Zein
- Cinematography: Hélène Louvart; Burak Kanbir
- Edited by: Soudade Kaadan; Nelly Quettier
- Music by: Rob Lane; Rob Manning
- Production companies: Film4; BFI; KAF Production; Stars Collective; Doha Film Institute; Berkeley Media Group; Ex-Nihilo
- Distributed by: Modern Films (United Kingdom)
- Release dates: 3 September 2022 (Venice); 3 May 2024 (United Kingdom)
- Running time: 100 minutes
- Countries: United Kingdom; France; Syria; Qatar
- Language: Arabic
- Box office: $26,683

Nezouh is a 2022 British-Syrian-French drama film written and directed by Soudade Kaadan.

The film premiered in the Horizons Extra section of the 79th edition of the Venice Film Festival, winning the Audience Award.

== Cast ==
- Hala Zein as Zeina
- Kinda Alloush as Hala
- Samir al-Masri as Motaz
- Nizar Alani as Amer

== Reception ==
On the review aggregator website Rotten Tomatoes, 83% of 12 critics' reviews are positive, with an average rating of 6.5/10.
