= The Card Player =

2004 giallo film directed by Dario Argento

- Italian theatrical poster
- Directed by: Dario Argento
- Screenplay by: Dario Argento; Franco Ferrini
- Story by: Dario Argento; Franco Ferrini
- Produced by: Dario Argento; Claudio Argento
- Starring: Stefania Rocca; Liam Cunningham; Silvio Muccino; Vera Gemma
- Cinematography: Benoît Debie
- Edited by: Walter Fasano
- Music by: Claudio Simonetti
- Distributed by: Medusa Film
- Release date: 2 January 2004
- Running time: 103 minutes
- Country: Italy
- Languages: Italian; English
- Budget: €2,000,000 (estimated)
- Box office: €2,713,882 (Italy; as of 18 January 2004)

The Card Player (Italian: Il cartaio) is a 2004 giallo film directed by Dario Argento. The film stars Stefania Rocca and Liam Cunningham and is Argento's second giallo feature of the decade (following Sleepless).

The film features a brief role by Fiore Argento, the director's eldest daughter. She had previously appeared in her father's film Phenomena.

== Plot ==
A serial killer known as the Card Player is kidnapping young women in Rome. Using a webcam set-up, the killer challenges the police by forcing them to play hands of Internet poker. If the police lose, the kidnapped victim is tortured and murdered on-screen. When a British tourist is among the girls murdered, Irish policeman John Brennan (Cunningham) is assigned the case and quickly teams up with Italian detective Anna Mari (Rocca). Nothing links the victims except for seeds found on their corpses.

While canvassing an arcade, Mari and Brennan meet a skilled young video poker aficionado named Remo (Muccino) and recruit him to help them play against the Card Player. Shortly after, the police chief's daughter Lucia (Argento) becomes the killer's latest kidnapping victim. Remo plays against the killer and wins, and Lucia is found alive in an alley afterward.

The police have a party to celebrate Lucia's safe return. After the party, Remo is approached by an attractive woman at a bar who leads him through the city. She turns out to have been hired by the killer, who murders Remo with a boat hook.

Brennan and Anna, whose relationship has become romantic, learn that the video of the first poker game contains the sound of a cannon fired at noon every day, meaning that it was actually prerecorded three hours before the game was played and that the room the Card Player streams from must be near the cannon. Brennan spots the plant that is the source of the seeds found on the bodies and discovers the entrance to the Card Player's room nearby. When he opens the door all the way, he is killed by a booby trap.

Brennan's abandoned car is found by police and they rush to the site. Anna rides with her coworker Carlo, but realizes on the way due to seeds in his car that he is the killer. He abducts her and handcuffs both of them to a railroad track, where he forces Mari to play poker against him for the key while a train bears down on them. Mari wins the first round, then uses advice from her father's book on poker to destabilize Carlo by mocking him. Angered, he attacks her and Mari obtains the key, freeing one of her hands and allowing her to roll off the track. As Carlo struggles to open his own handcuffs with the spare, the train hits and kills him.

Some time later, Mari, now chief inspector, learns on the phone that she is pregnant, presumably by Brennan, and smiles.

== Cast ==
- Stefania Rocca as Anna Mari
- Liam Cunningham as John Brennan
- Silvio Muccino as Remo
- Claudio Santamaria as Carlo Sturni
- Adalberto Maria Merli as The Police Commissioner
- Fiore Argento as Lucia Marini
- Cosimo Fusco as Berardelli
- Mia Benedetta as Francesca
- Giovanni Visentin as C.I.D. Chief
- Vera Gemma as Third Victim

== Production ==
Originally conceived as a sequel to the director's own The Stendhal Syndrome to be titled In the Dark, the film was rewritten when that film's star, Asia Argento, declined to be involved. The setting was changed from Venice to Rome to bring costs down and recapture the feel of Argento's early giallo, The Bird with the Crystal Plumage. The director said: "My fans love it when I shoot in Rome. The city is the most wonderful film set ever, like a dusty museum with its cocktail of rundown buildings and beautiful open spaces."

== Release ==
The film was released in Italy in January 2004. In the United States, following a small number of cinema screenings, it was released on DVD by Anchor Bay Entertainment later that year. The film premiered on DVD in the UK in October 2004, after receiving a 15 certificate from the BBFC.

=== Critical reception ===
The Card Player received a negative response from critics. The film has an approval rating of 22% on movie review aggregator website Rotten Tomatoes, based on 9 reviews. The New York Times wrote, "The Card Player [...] doesn't break the unhappy streak of his [Argento's] later films. Though it's based on a promisingly outrageous premise [...] the film unfolds as a tired, thoroughly conventional police procedural that might as well be titled CSI: Roma." AllMovie's review was unfavorable, writing, "The Card Player offers a fair amount of suspense and at least one memorable set piece, but for those even remotely familiar with Argento's canon, there's the feeling that it's all been done before – and handled with much more style and confidence." Maitland McDonagh also gave the film a negative review, criticizing the screenplay for being "perfunctory" and for going "to so little trouble to hide the killer's identity that even inattentive viewers will know who's to blame long before the police figure it out."
