= Ordinary Failures =

- Běžná selhání
- Directed by: Cristina Groşan
- Screenplay by: Klára Vlasáková
- Produced by: Marek Novák Judit Stalter Maria Stocchi Monika Lošťáková Zuzana Jankovičová
- Starring: Taťjana Medvecká
- Cinematography: Márk Győri
- Edited by: Anna Meller
- Music by: Pjoni
- Release date: 2022
- Running time: 84 min.
- Countries: Czech Republic; Hungary; Italy; Slovakia
- Language: Czech

Ordinary Failures (Czech: Běžná selhání) is a 2022 sci-fi drama film directed by Cristina Groşan. It is a co-production between Czech Republic, Hungary, Italy and Slovakia.

The film premiered at the Venice Days section of the 79th edition of the Venice Film Festival.

== Cast ==
- Taťjana Medvecká as Hana
- Beáta Kaňoková as Silva
- Nora Klimešová as Tereza
- Vica Kerekes as Edita
- Adam Berka as David
- Rostislav Novák jr. as Stanislav
- Jana Stryková as Karolína
- Luboš Veselý as Václav
