= Gerhard Fritsch =

Austrian novelist and poet (1924–1969)

- Born: 28 March 1924; Vienna, Austria
- Died: 22 March 1969 (aged 44); Vienna, Austria
- Occupations: Novelist; poet

Gerhard Fritsch (28 March 1924 – 22 March 1969) was an Austrian novelist and poet. He achieved considerable success with his first novel, Moos auf den Steinen (Moss on the Stones). It was later adapted into a film. Fritsch's second novel, Fasching (Carnival), was published in 1969, the year in which he committed suicide.

In 1961, he translated W. H. Auden's long poem For the Time Being: A Christmas Oratorio into German under the title Hier und jetzt. Ein Weihnachtsoratorium.
