= Arthur Robin =

Guadeloupean-French bodybuilder (1927–2023)

- Born: 5 February 1927
- Died: 20 January 2023 (aged 95)
- Occupation: Professional bodybuilder

Arthur Robin (5 February 1927 – 20 January 2023) was a French professional bodybuilder. He won the 1957 Mr. Universe championship. He was the first Black winner of the competition.

== Biography ==
Robin was born on 5 February 1927. Robin played himself in the 2016 Austrian-Italian fictional film Mister Universo, in which a circus liontamer goes searching for Robin. The film was shown at the 2016 Vienna International Film Festival. Robin died on 20 January 2023, at the age of 95.
