= The Wanton of Spain =

1969 film

- Spanish: La Celestina
- Directed by: César Fernández Ardavín
- Screenplay by: César Fernández Ardavín
- Based on: La Celestina by Fernando de Rojas
- Starring: Julián Mateos; Elisa Ramírez; Amelia de la Torre; Gonzalo Cañas; Antonio Medina; Heidelotte Diehl; Uschi Mellin; Konrad Wagner; Eva Lissa; Eva Guerr; Hugo Blanco
- Cinematography: Raúl Pérez Cubero
- Edited by: Petra de Nieva
- Music by: Ángel Arteaga
- Production companies: Aro Films; Hesperia Films; BTS Manfred Durniok
- Release date: 6 April 1969 (Spain)
- Running time: 123 minutes
- Countries: Spain; Germany
- Language: Spanish
- Budget: 13.9 million ₧

The Wanton of Spain (Spanish: La Celestina) is a 1969 drama film directed by and written César Fernández Ardavín based on the work by Fernando de Rojas. It stars Julián Mateos, Elisa Ramírez, and Amelia de la Torre.

== Cast ==
- Julián Mateos as Calisto
- Elisa Ramírez as Melibea
- Amelia de la Torre as Celestina
- Hugo Blanco as Centurio
- Gonzalo Cañas as Pármeno
- Heidelotte Diehl as Areúsa
- Eva Guerr as Lucrecia
- Eva Lissa as Alisa
- Antonio Mancho as Sosia
- Antonio Medina as Sempronio
- Uschi Mellin as Elicia
- Konrad Wagner as Pleberio

== Release ==
The film premiered on 6 April 1969. It was also entered into the 6th Moscow International Film Festival.

== Reception ==
The film was selected as the Spanish entry for the Best Foreign Language Film at the 42nd Academy Awards, but was not accepted as a nominee.

== See also ==
- List of Spanish films of 1969
- List of submissions to the 42nd Academy Awards for Best Foreign Language Film
- List of Spanish submissions for the Academy Award for Best Foreign Language Film
