= The Man Who Wanted to Kill Himself (1970 film) =

- Theatrical film poster
- Spanish: El hombre que se quiso matar
- Directed by: Rafael Gil
- Written by: Wenceslao Fernández Flórez (novel); Rafael J. Salvia
- Starring: Tony Leblanc; Antonio Garisa; Elisa Ramírez
- Cinematography: José F. Aguayo
- Edited by: José Luis Matesanz
- Music by: Manuel Parada
- Production company: Coral Producciones Cinematográficas
- Distributed by: Paramount Films de España
- Release date: 28 September 1970
- Running time: 91 minutes
- Country: Spain
- Language: Spanish

The Man Who Wanted to Kill Himself (Spanish: El hombre que se quiso matar) is a 1970 Spanish comedy film directed by Rafael Gil and starring Tony Leblanc, Antonio Garisa and Elisa Ramírez. It is a remake of the 1942 film of the same title, which was also directed by Rafael Gil.

== Cast ==
- Tony Leblanc as Federico Solá
- Antonio Garisa as Sr. Argüelles
- Elisa Ramírez as Irene Argüelles
- Rafael Alonso as real estate agent
- Aurora Redondo as Doña Amalia
- Emma Cohen as Huéspeda hippie
- Milagros Leal as Enriqueta's mother
- José Sacristán as Jorge Yarza
- José Orjas as Don Rodrigo
- Beni Deus as Ramón
- Mary Begoña as Enriqueta
- Alfonso del Real as Sr. Pujol
- Gabriel Llopart as Principal
- Erasmo Pascual as restorer of the Aqueduct of Segovia
- Luis Induni as Sr. Ingeniero
- Goyo Lebrero as Gatekeeper of the Recreational Circle
- Rafael Hernández as guard
- José Morales as waiter
- Sergio Mendizábal as engineer
- Antonio Cintado as Requejo
- Mario Morales as Requejo's friend
- Nuria Gimeno
- José Mata as pool player
- Fabián Conde
- Julia Caba Alba as Patron
