= Wolf and Dog =

- Directed by: Cláudia Varejão
- Screenplay by: Leda Cartum; Cláudia Varejão
- Starring: Ana Cabral
- Cinematography: Rui Xavier
- Edited by: João Braz
- Music by: Xinobi
- Release date: 2022
- Language: Portuguese

Wolf and Dog (Portuguese: Lobo e Cão) is a 2022 Portuguese drama film co-written and directed by Cláudia Varejão, in her feature debut.

The film premiered at the 79th edition of the Venice Film Festival, in the Giornate degli Autori sidebar, in which it won the Director's Award.

== Cast ==
- Ana Cabral as Ana
- Ruben Pimenta as Luis
- Cristiana Branquinho as Cloé
- Marlene Cordeiro as Paulina
- João Tavares as Telmo
- Nuno Ferreira as Simão
- Luísa Alves as Amélia
- Maria Furtado as Lucinda
