= Vera Gemma =

Italian actress

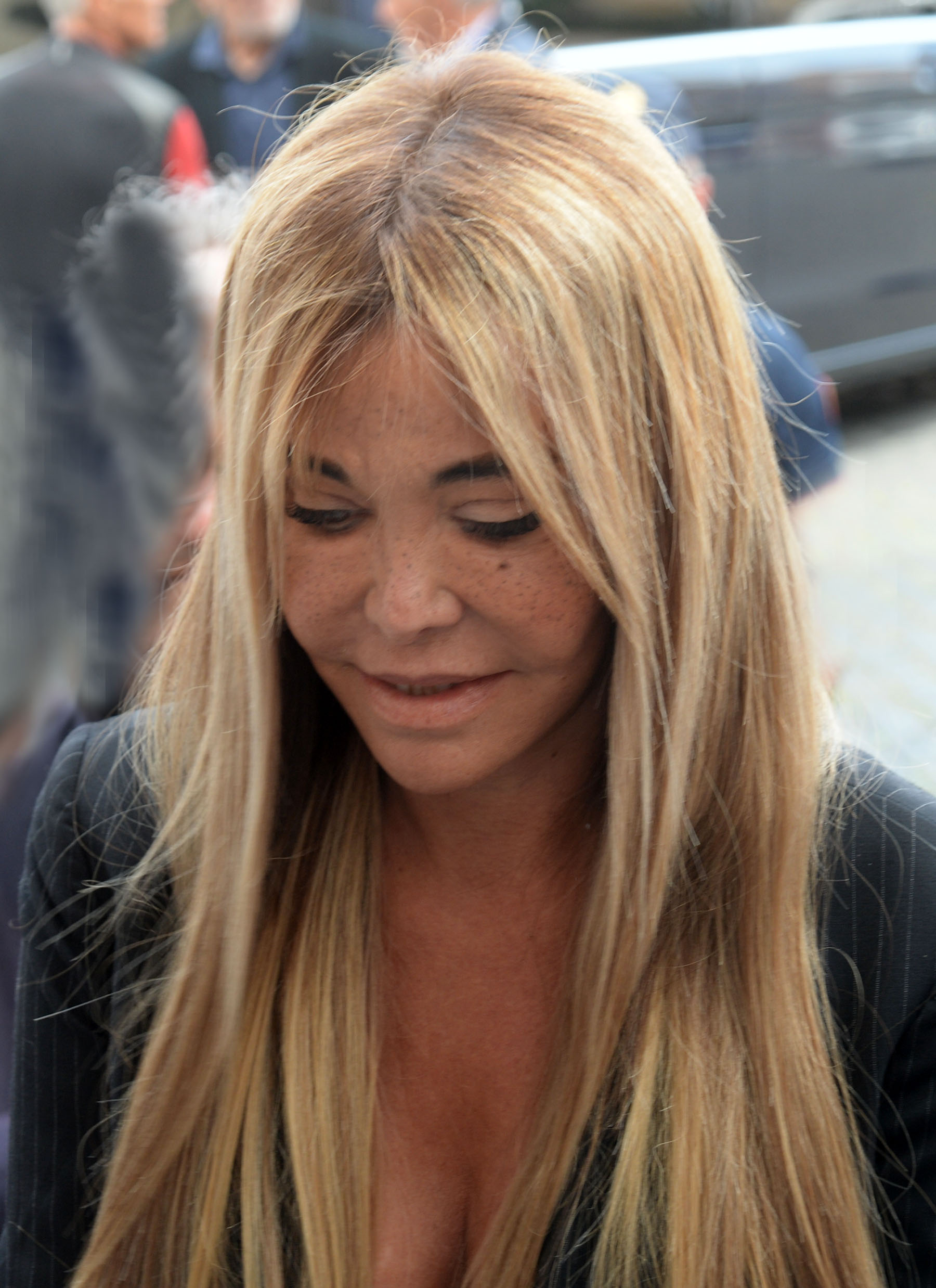
- Vera Gemma in 2025
- Born: 4 July 1970 (age 55); Rome, Italy
- Occupation: Actress
- Years active: 1995–present
- Parent: Giuliano Gemma (father)

Vera Gemma (born 4 July 1970) is an Italian actress. Her father was the film actor Giuliano Gemma.

== Filmography ==
- Vera (2022)
- The Card Player (2004)
- Scarlet Diva (2000)
- E insieme vivremo tutte le stagioni (1999)
- Cartoni animati (1997)
- Stressati (1997)
- Hardboiled Egg (1997)
- Alliance cherche doigt (1997)
- Ladri di cinema (1996)
- The Stendhal Syndrome (1996)
