= Scarlet Diva =

- Scarlet Diva film poster
- Directed by: Asia Argento
- Written by: Asia Argento
- Produced by: Claudio Argento; Dario Argento; Stefano Curti
- Starring: Asia Argento
- Cinematography: Frederic Fasano
- Edited by: Anna Rosa Napoli
- Music by: John Hughes
- Distributed by: Minerva
- Release date: May 26, 2000
- Running time: 91 minutes
- Country: Italy
- Languages: English; Italian; French

Scarlet Diva is a 2000 Italian drama film by actress and first-time director and screenwriter Asia Argento.

== Plot summary ==
Scarlet Diva is a semi-autobiographical film about the Italian actress and director Asia Argento's life as an actress. A self-destructive streak in Anna Battista (Argento) pulls her into drugs, sex and other excesses. To combat this descent, she attempts to fulfill her creative side by becoming a film director. Battista's attempts to realize her talent are thwarted by her desires and the uncaring responses of those around her. As part of her plans to become a director and bring her story to the screen, Battista travels to Los Angeles but only meets a shady film producer (Joe Coleman). She falls in love with an uncaring Australian rock and roll star (Jean Sheperd), then finds out she is pregnant by him. But her life is still in disarray as she uses drugs to help herself feel better.

== Cast ==
- Asia Argento as Anna Battista
- Gloria Pirrocco as Young Anna
- Jean Sheperd as Kirk Vaines
- Herbert Fritsch as Aaron Ulrich
- Francesca D'Aloja as Margherita
- Vera Gemma as Veronica Lanza
- Daria Nicolodi as Anna's Mother
- Selen as Quelou
- Leo Gullotta as Dr. Vessi
- Joe Coleman as Mr. Paar
- Justinian Kfoury as J-Bird
- Schoolly D as Hash-Man
- Leonardo Servadio as Young Alioscia
- Paolo Bonacelli as Swiss Journalist

== Production ==
Scarlet Diva was shot entirely on digital video, making it among the earliest feature films to be created with this technology.

Though penetration isn't explicitly shown, Asia Argento revealed the sex scenes went way beyond acting. "It's true, the sex scenes are real. But I wasn't interested in penetration. I was interested in showing what the real sex did to the faces and the bodies of the actors," she said.

== Harvey Weinstein reenactment scene ==
In October 2017, Argento revealed that the scene in which the producer tries to assault the main character is based on the alleged sexual assault on her by Harvey Weinstein, except "In the movie [...] I ran away" according to Argento.

== Reception and legacy ==
The film tied with two other films to win the Brooklyn Film Festival Award for Best New Director.

A videocassette of the film can be seen on a shelf behind the counter in a video rental store in Dario Argento's film Do You Like Hitchcock?
