= Mister Universo =

2016 film

- Film poster
- Directed by: Tizza Covi; Rainer Frimmel
- Written by: Tizza Covi
- Starring: Tairo Caroli
- Release date: 6 August 2016 (Locarno)
- Running time: 90 minutes
- Countries: Austria; Italy
- Language: Italian

Mister Universo is a 2016 Austrian-Italian drama film directed by Tizza Covi and Rainer Frimmel. It was screened in the Contemporary World Cinema section at the 2016 Toronto International Film Festival. It was also screened at the 2016 Locarno Festival and the 2016 Vienna International Film Festival where it won an award.

The film shows the everyday life of the slowly disappearing world of the circus with a cast of amateur actors. The winner of the 1957 Mr Universe competition, Arthur Robin, played himself in the film, as did a number of other members of the cast.

== Plot ==
Tairo, a young circus liontamer, loses a lucky horseshoe charm that had been bent out of iron by strongman Arthur Robin, a former winner of the Mr. Universe competition. The horseshoe was given to Tairo when he was a child. After several things go wrong for Tairo and he becomes disenchanted with life, he goes on a search for Arthur Robin to ask him to make a new lucky horseshoe. Tairo reunites with many of his relatives as he searches for Robin, whom he eventually finds living with his wife in a caravan park in Milan.

== Cast ==
- Tairo Caroli
- Wendy Weber
- Arthur Robin
- Lilly Robin

== Reception ==
On review aggregator website Rotten Tomatoes, the film holds an approval rating of 100% based on 6 reviews, with an average rating of 8.0/10.

== Awards ==
- MehrWERT-Filmpreis der Erste Bank (Erste Bank’s MoreValue Film Award), Vienna International Film Festival, 2016.
