= Cláudia Varejão =

Portuguese filmmaker (born 1980)

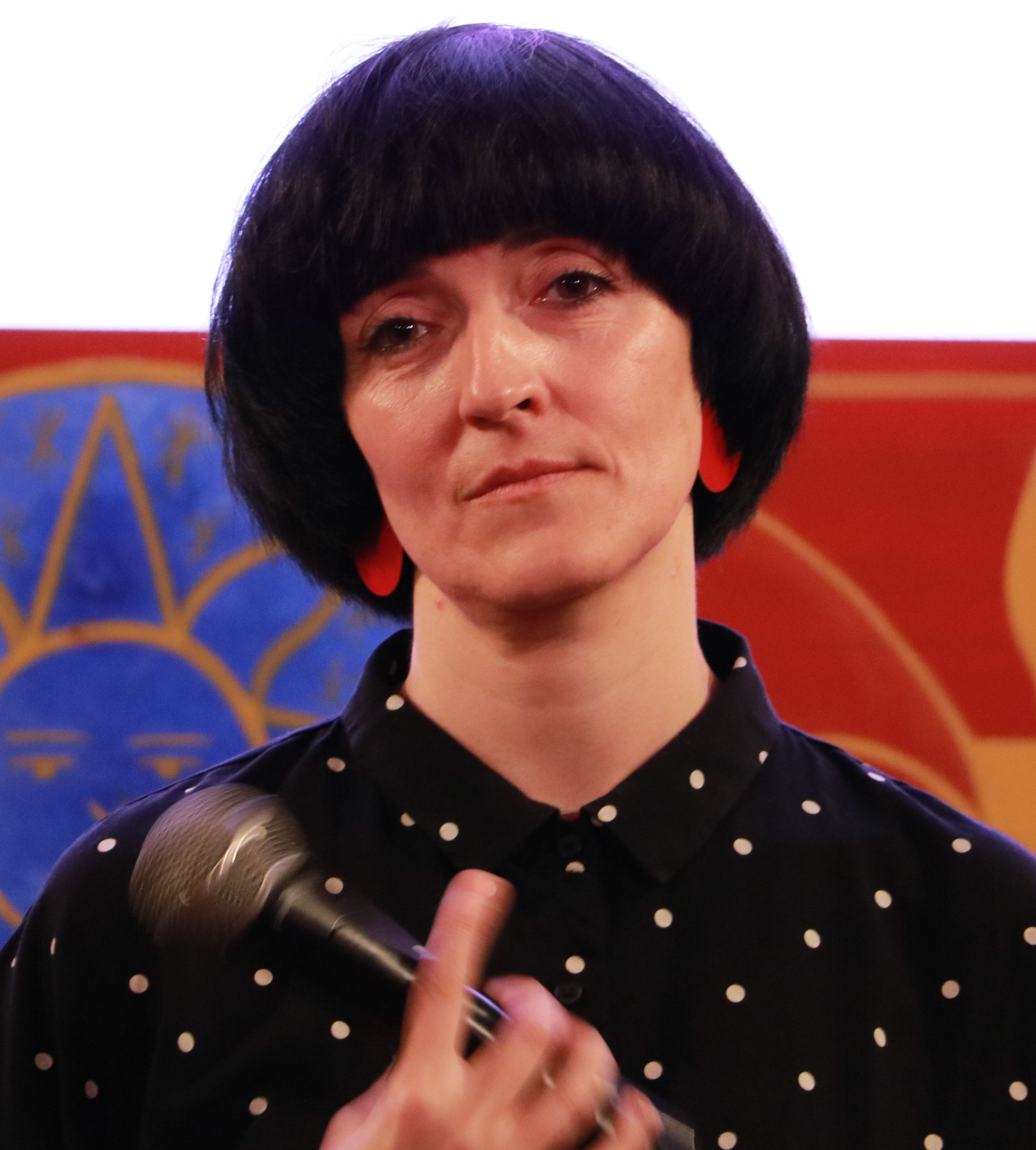
- Varejão in 2022
- Born: 1980 (age 45–46); Porto, Portugal
- Occupation: Film director

Cláudia Varejão (born in 1980) is a Portuguese film director and screenwriter.

== Life and career ==
Born in Porto, Varejão studied photography at the Ar.Co Center in Lisbon and cinema at Deutsche Film- und Fernsehakademie Berlin and at the São Paulo International Film Academy. In 2013, her short Luz da Manhã was nominated for best short film at Sophia Awards. Her 2016 documentary Ama-San received a special mention at the 51st Karlovy Vary International Film Festival. Her 2020 documentary film Amor Fati was screened in numerous festivals, including International Film Festival Rotterdam, Shanghai International Film Festival, Visions du Réel, CPH:DOX, and Doclisboa.

In 2022, Varejão made her feature debut with the film Wolf and Dog, which premiered at the 79th Venice International Film Festival, winning the Giornate degli Autori Director's Award. In 2024, her short documentary film Kora premiered at the 81st Venice International Film Festival. It won the Sophia Award for best short documentary film.

== Selected filmography ==
- Luz da Manhã (short, 2011)
- Ama-san (2016)
- No escuro do cinema descalço os sapatos (2016)
- Amor Fati (2020)
- Wolf and Dog (2022)
- Kora (short, 2024)
