= Georg Lhotsky =

Austrian actor

Georg Lhotzky
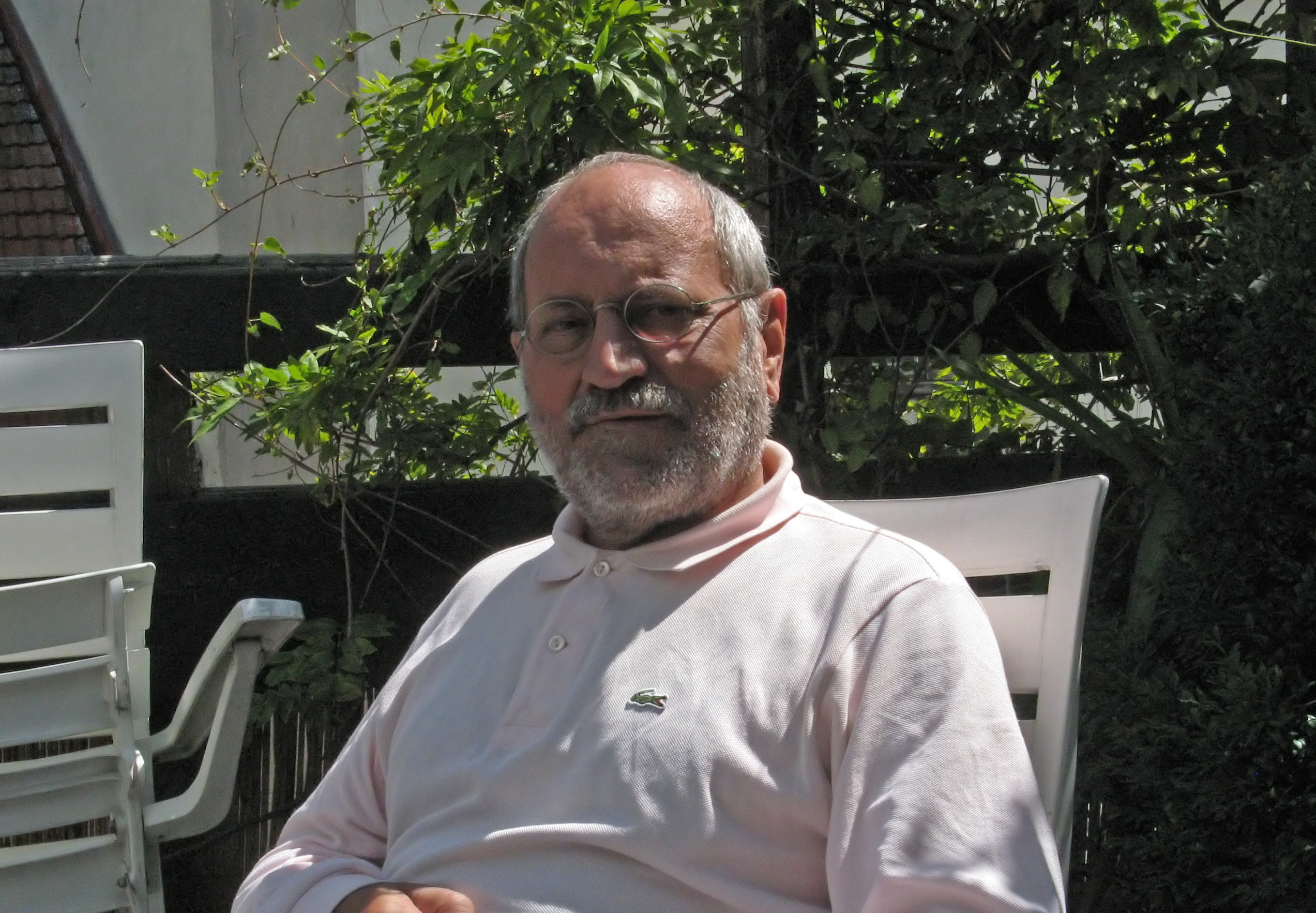
- Born: 6 February 1937; Opava, Czechoslovakia
- Died: 28 November 2016 (aged 79)
- Occupations: Actor, film director
- Years active: 1960–1997

Georg Lhotzky (6 February 1937 – 28 November 2016) was an Austrian actor and film director. He directed 15 films between 1960 and 1991.

== Selected filmography ==
- Moss on the Stones (1968)
- I Want to Live (1976)
