= Tizza Covi =

Italian screenwriter and director

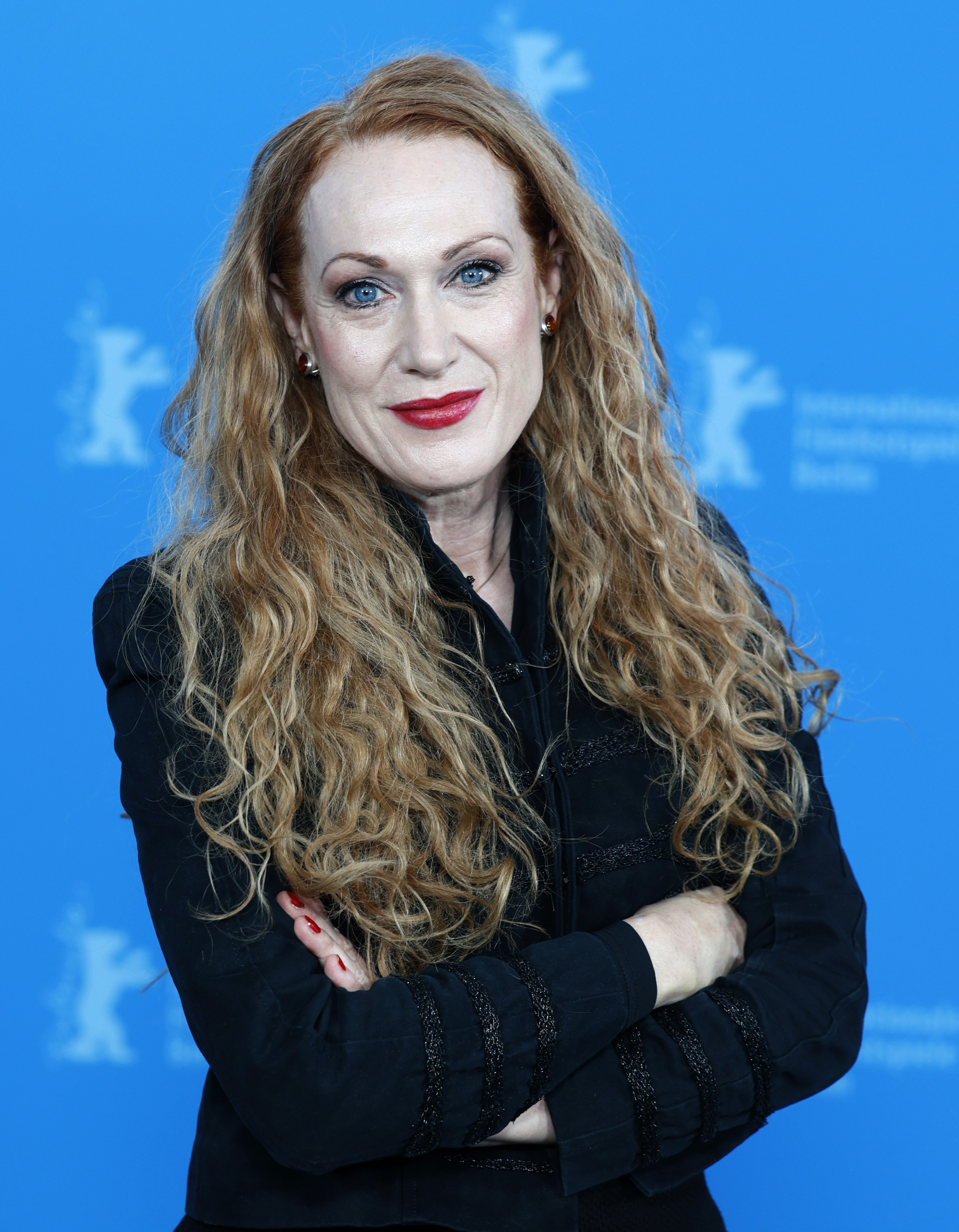
- Covi in 2026
- Born: 6 May 1971 (age 55); Bolzano, Italy
- Occupations: Filmmaker; Screenwriter
- Years active: 1996–present

Tizza Covi (1971, in Bolzano) is an Italian screenwriter and director. She lived in Paris and Berlin before studying photography in Vienna. After finishing her studies she went to Rome where she worked as a photographer.

Since 1996 she works together with Rainer Frimmel on films, theatre, and photography. In 2002 they founded their own film production company, Vento Film, to produce their films independently.

== Career ==
Without exception, Tizza Covi shoots her films in a two-person team with Rainer Frimmel. Tizza Covi co-directs the film, writes the script and edits most of the films, while Rainer Frimmel is responsible for the camera and production in addition to co-directing. All their films are shot on 16mm with their Aaton and were realised with amateur actors.

They have won several awards for their documentaries, including the Wolfgang-Staudte-Award at the Berlinale for Babooska.

La Pivellina is their first fiction feature film and has been screened worldwide in more than 130 International Film Festivals. The film has received numerous international awards including the Europa Cinemas Label in Cannes and was selected as the Austrian entry for the Best Foreign Language Film at the 83rd Academy Awards, but didn't make the final shortlist. Their second feature film, The shine of day, premiered in the international competition in Locarno 2012 and won the Silver Leopard for Best Actor. The film was also awarded as Best Austrian Movie of the year at the Diagonale, and won the Max Ophüls Award in Saarbrücken 2013.

Their third movie "Mister Universo" was part of the International competition in Locarno and picked up 5 awards, among other a special mention of the International Jury, the Europa Cinema Label and the Fipresci Award.

In 2018, she was appointed as a jury member for the International Competition at the Locarno Festival.

Her documentary (again with Rainer Frimmel) "Notes from the Underworld" premiered at the Berlinale 2020 in the Panorama Dokumente section and won a special mention. At the Romy Awards 2020, she was awarded for this film in the categories Best Cinema Documentary and Best Production Cinema Film. The film was also awarded as Best Austrian Movie of the year at the Diagonale.

Her fiction movie project Vera, about the actress Vera Gemma, daughter of Giuliano Gemma, was awarded the Best Director prize in the Orizzonti section of the 2022 Venice International Film Festival. The film was also awarded as Best Austrian Movie of the year at the Diagonale.

== Filmography ==
- 2001: Das ist alles (That’s all)
- 2005: Babooska
- 2009: La Pivellina
- 2012: Der Glanz des Tages (The shine of day)
- 2016: Mister Universo
- 2020: Notes from the Underworld
- 2022: Vera
- 2026: The Loneliest Man in Town
