= Rainer Frimmel =

Austrian director and photographer (born 1971)

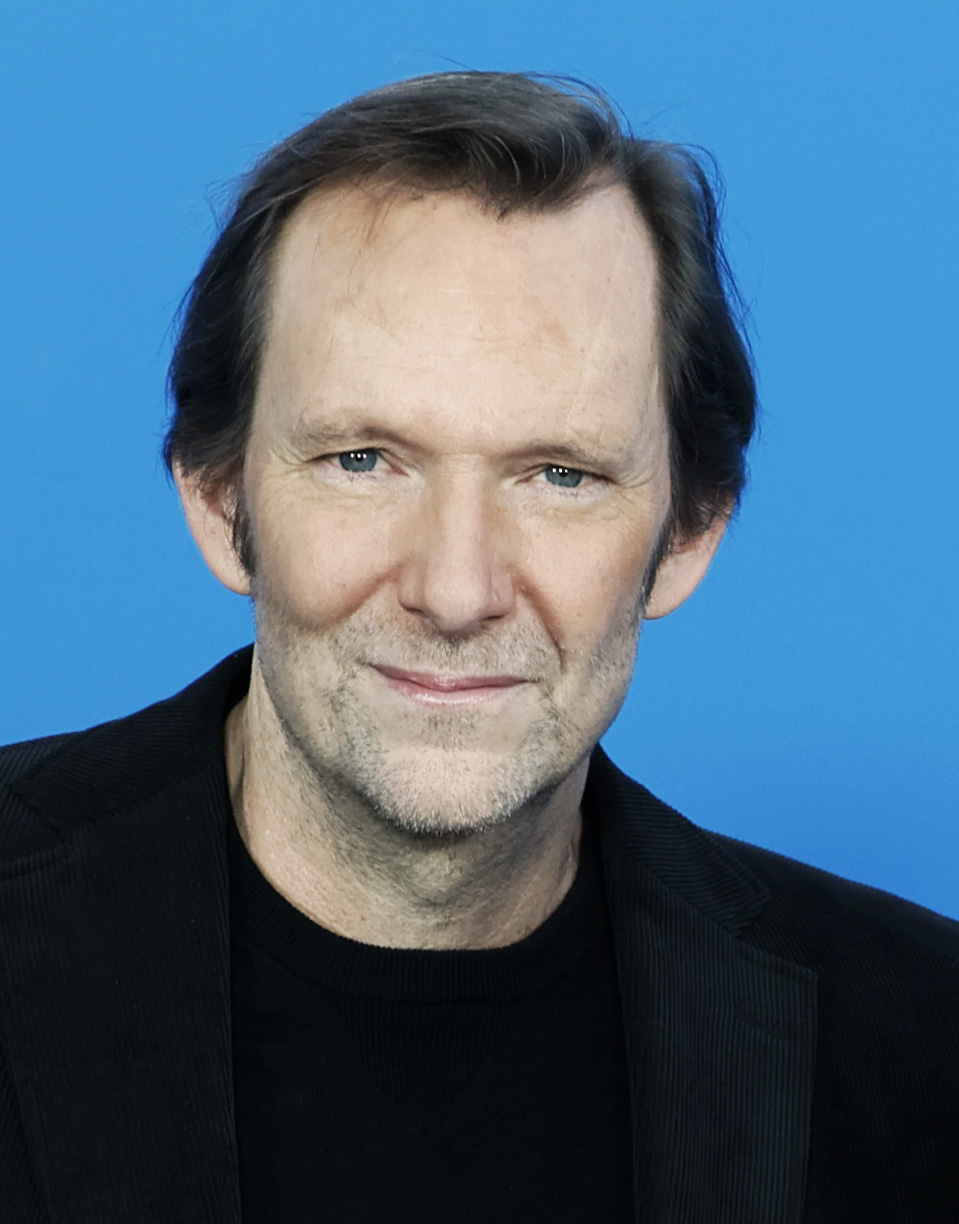
- Frimmel in 2026
- Born: 11 July 1971 (age 54); Vienna, Austria
- Occupations: Filmmaker; Screenwriter
- Years active: 1996–present

Rainer Frimmel (born 11 July 1971, Vienna) is an Austrian director and photographer. After studying psychology in Vienna he graduated as a photographer. He has received scholarships in New York City, Paris and Rome for his photographic work.

Since 1996 he has been working together with Tizza Covi on films, theatre, and photography.

== With Tizza Covi ==
In 2002 Frimmel and Covi founded their own film production company Vento Film to produce their films independently.

They have won several awards for their documentaries, including the Wolfgang-Staudte-Award at the Berlinale for Babooska.

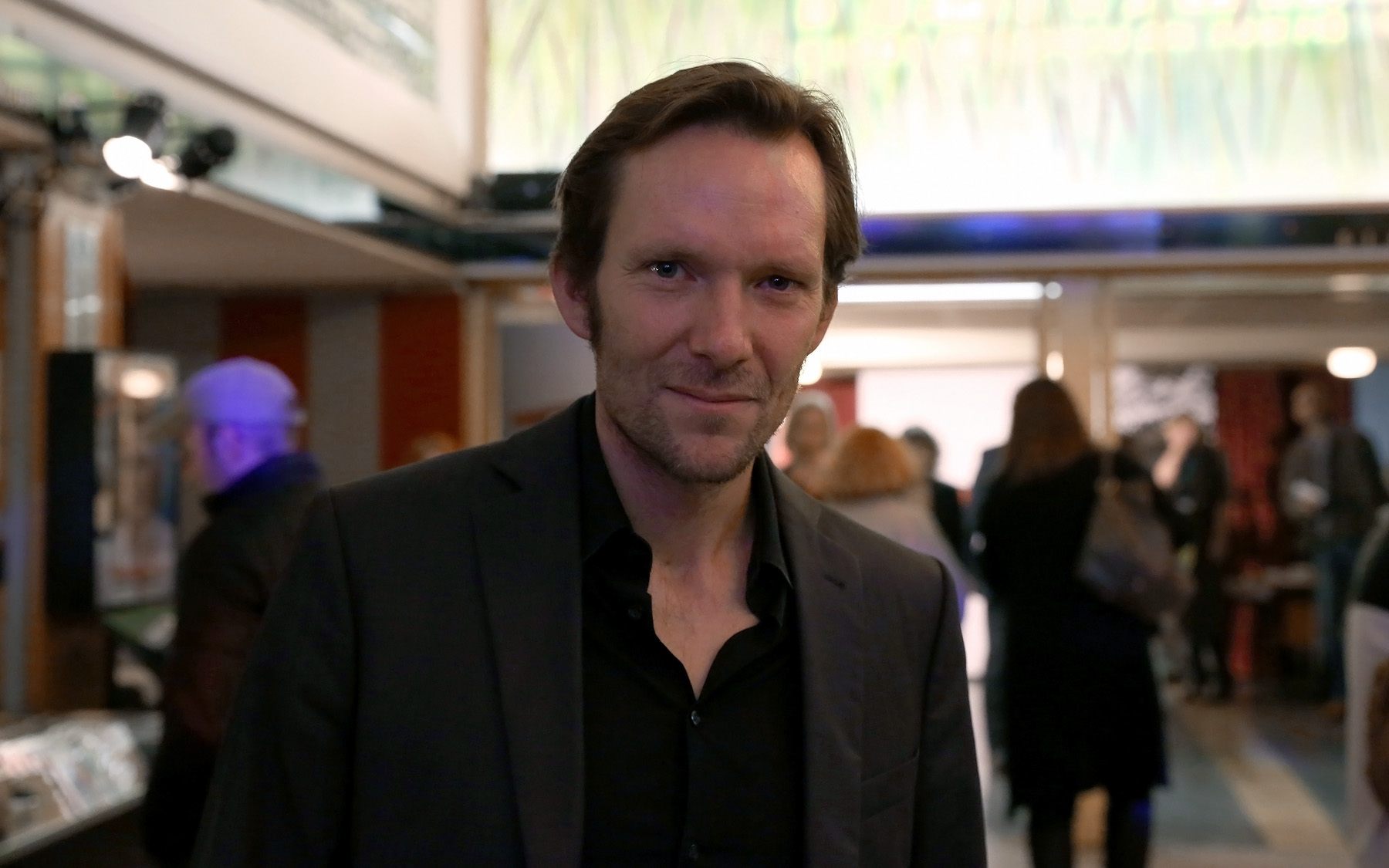
Frimmel, opening night of Vienna International Film Festival 2013 (Gartenbaukino, Vienna, Austria).

La Pivellina is their first fiction feature film and has been screened worldwide in more than 130 International Film Festivals. The film has received numerous international awards including the Europa Cinemas Label in Cannes and was selected as the Austrian entry for the Best Foreign Language Film at the 83rd Academy Awards, but didn't make the final shortlist.

Their second feature film, The shine of day, premiered in the international competition in Locarno 2012 and won the Silver Leopard for Best Actor. The film was also awarded as Best Austrian Movie of the year at the Diagonale, and won the Max Ophüls Award in Saarbrücken 2013.

== Filmography ==
- 2026 The Loneliest Man in Town
- 2022 Vera
- 2020 Notes from the Underworld
- 2016 Mister Universo
- 2012 Der Glanz des Tages (The shine of day)
- 2009 La Pivellina
- 2005 Babooska
- 2001 Das ist alles (That’s all)
- 2000 Aufzeichnungen aus dem Tiefparterre (Notes from the basement)
