= Alzira, Spain =

Alzira Alcira
- City and municipality
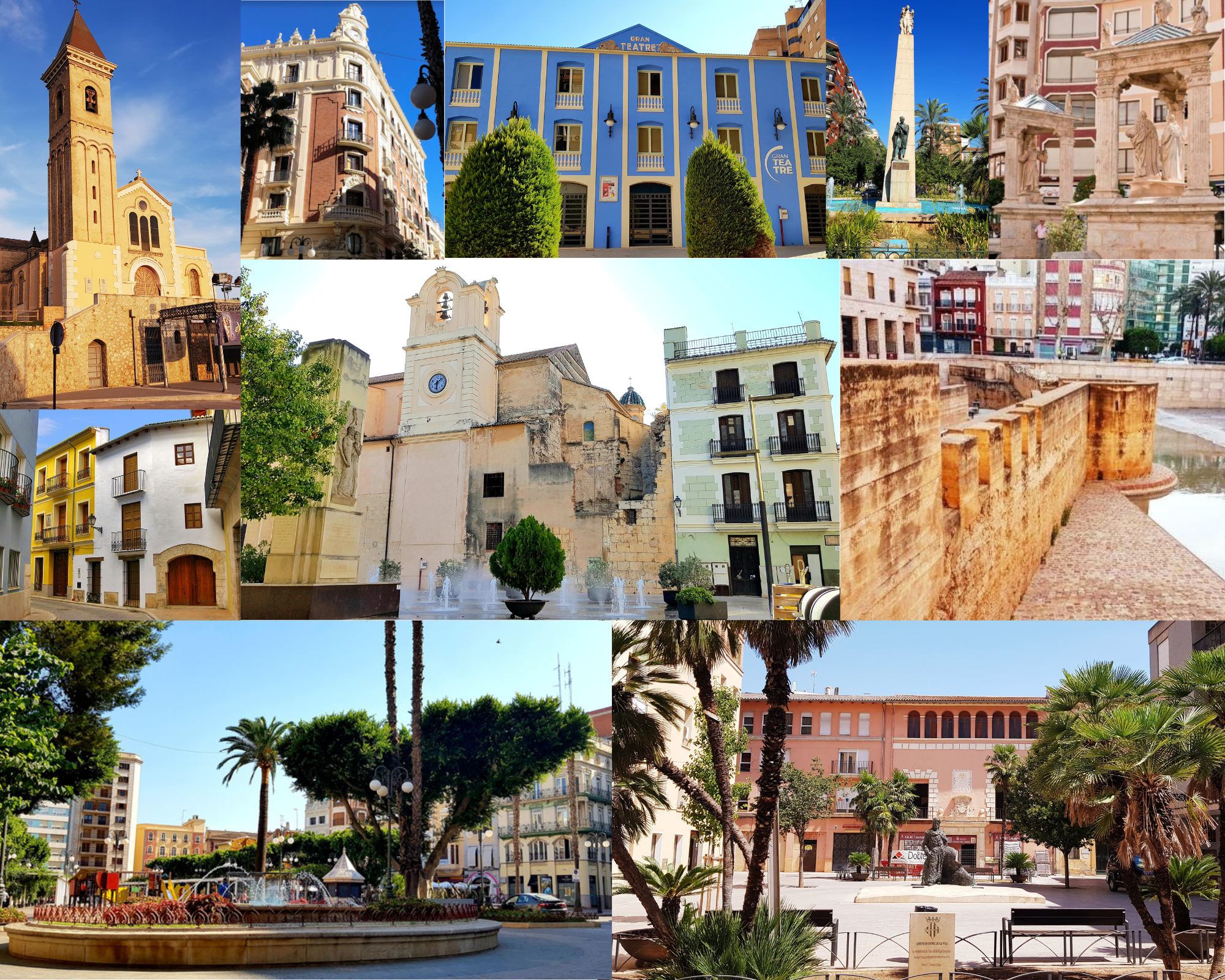

- Flag Coat of arms
- Interactive map of Alzira
- Location within Province of Valencia Location within Valencian Community Location within Spain
- Coordinates: 39°09′00″N 0°26′06″W
- Country: Spain
- Autonomous community: Valencian Community
- Province: Valencia / València
- Comarca: Ribera Alta
- Judicial district: Alzira

Government
  - Alcalde: Alfons Domínguez Gento (2023) (Compromís)

Area
  - Total: 110.4 km^{2} (42.6 sq mi)
- Elevation: 14 m (46 ft)

Population (2025-01-01)
  - Total: 48,236
  - Density: 436.9/km^{2} (1,132/sq mi)
- Demonyms: Alziran • alzireny, -a (Val.) • alcireño/a (Sp.)
- Official language(s): Valencian; Spanish
- Linguistic area: Valencian
- Time zone: UTC+1 (CET)
  - Summer (DST): UTC+2 (CEST)
- Postal code: 46600; 46268 (La Garrofera)
- Website: www.alzira.es

Alzira, (Note: Pronunciation of Alzira: Valencian: [alˈziɾa]) in Valencian, spelled Alcira (Note: Pronunciation of Alcira (unofficial): Spanish: [alˈθiɾa]) in Spanish, is a city and municipality of 49,480 inhabitants (62,094 floating population) in Valencia, eastern Spain. It is the capital of the comarca of Ribera Alta in the province of Valencia. The city is the heart of the second largest urban agglomeration in the province, with a population of over 100,000.

== Geographic situation ==
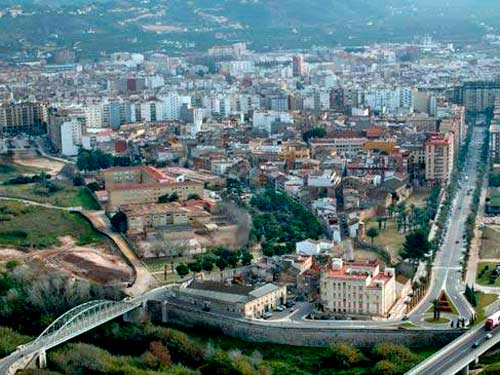

Alzira is located in the province of Valencia, on the left bank of the Xúquer river, and on the Valencia–Alicante railway.

Alzira's climate is typically Mediterranean: warm with no extremes of temperature either in summer or winter. Rainfall is scarce and irregular. Torrential rains usually follow periods of relative drought.

The town is situated on the shores of the Xúquer river and contains the Murta and Casella valleys. Alzira's borough extends over 111 square kilometres.

== History ==
Alzira was founded by Andalusis under the name Jazīrah Shukr (Arabic: جَزِيرَة شُقْر) Arabic for "island along the Xúquer", shortened to al-Jazìra in late Andalusi Arabic and early Valencian Romance, from which it was taken into Spanish.

It was a prosperous trading station during Andalusis' time, which lasted over five hundred years. During that time the city had a local administrative government and was considered as a cultural hub for writers, philosophers, and law experts.

The city was conquered by James I of Aragon on 30 December 1242.

Alzira, located right on the bank of the Xúquer, has suffered devastating floods throughout its history - in particular in 1472, 1590, 1864, 1916, 1957, 1982, 1987, 2006 and 2024.

Alzira has historically been a walled town, surrounded by palm, orange and mulberry groves, and by low-lying rice-swamps, which rendered its neighborhood somewhat unhealthy. It is sometimes identified with the Roman Saetabicula or with the pre-Roman Sucro. The mutiny at Sucro of 206 BC, suppressed by Scipio Africanus, was possibly at or near present-day Alzira.

== Economy ==
Agriculture was the prime economic driving force in Alzira up to the mid-20th century. The most important produce are oranges and they are distributed by important local co-operatives.

During the 20th century, Alzira changed from an agricultural economy to a diverse industry-orientated city with an important commercial infrastructure and associated services. Many companies have their head-office in the city: building and publishing companies, diverse manufacturers, textile and ice cream factories, etc. Alzira has become a very important commercial city due to its influence area, which is estimated about 300,000 inhabitants.

== Healthcare ==
Alzira has a 250-bed Community Hospital, the Hospital de la Ribera, which was built in 1999 by UTE-Ribera, under a Private Finance Initiative scheme. This capitation based system with integration between primary and secondary care providers and a unified IT system across all services has become known as the Alzira model and received a great deal of attention. The quality of services appears to be considerably higher than other health care systems.

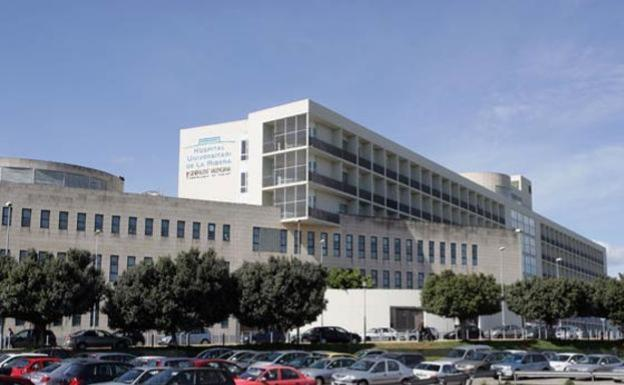
Hospital de La Ribera

== Main sights ==
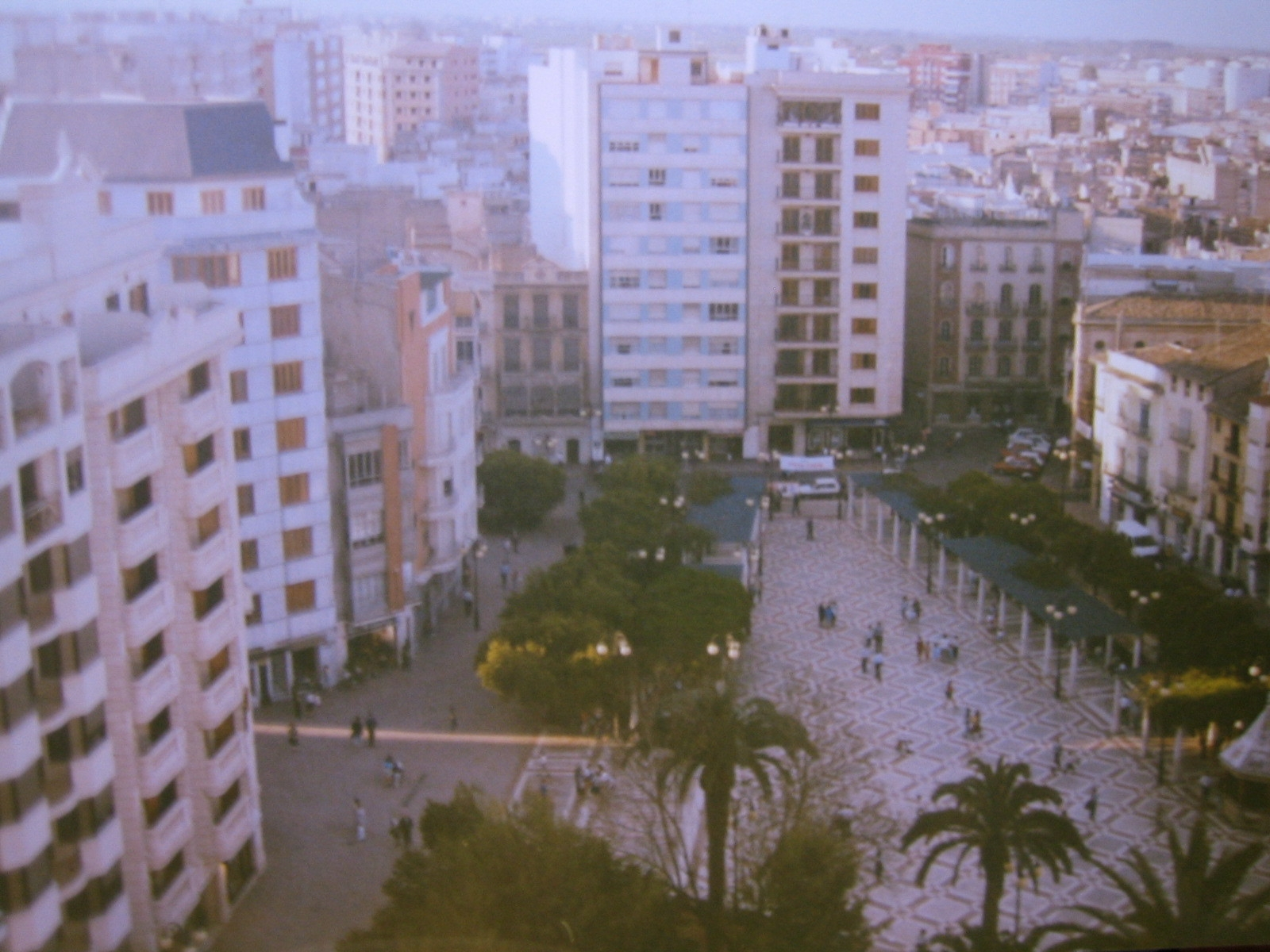
Plaça Major in the city center

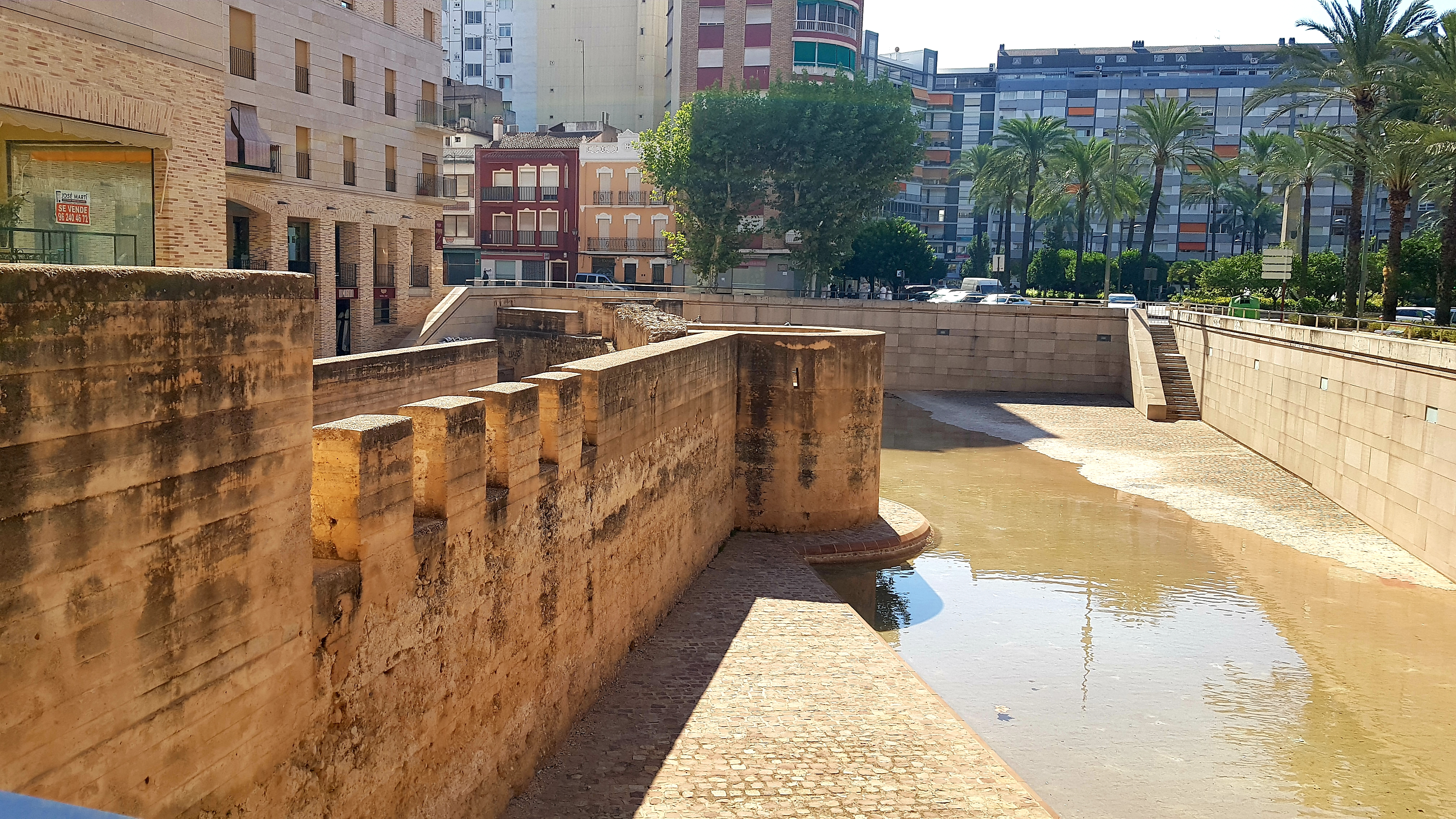
Moorish walls

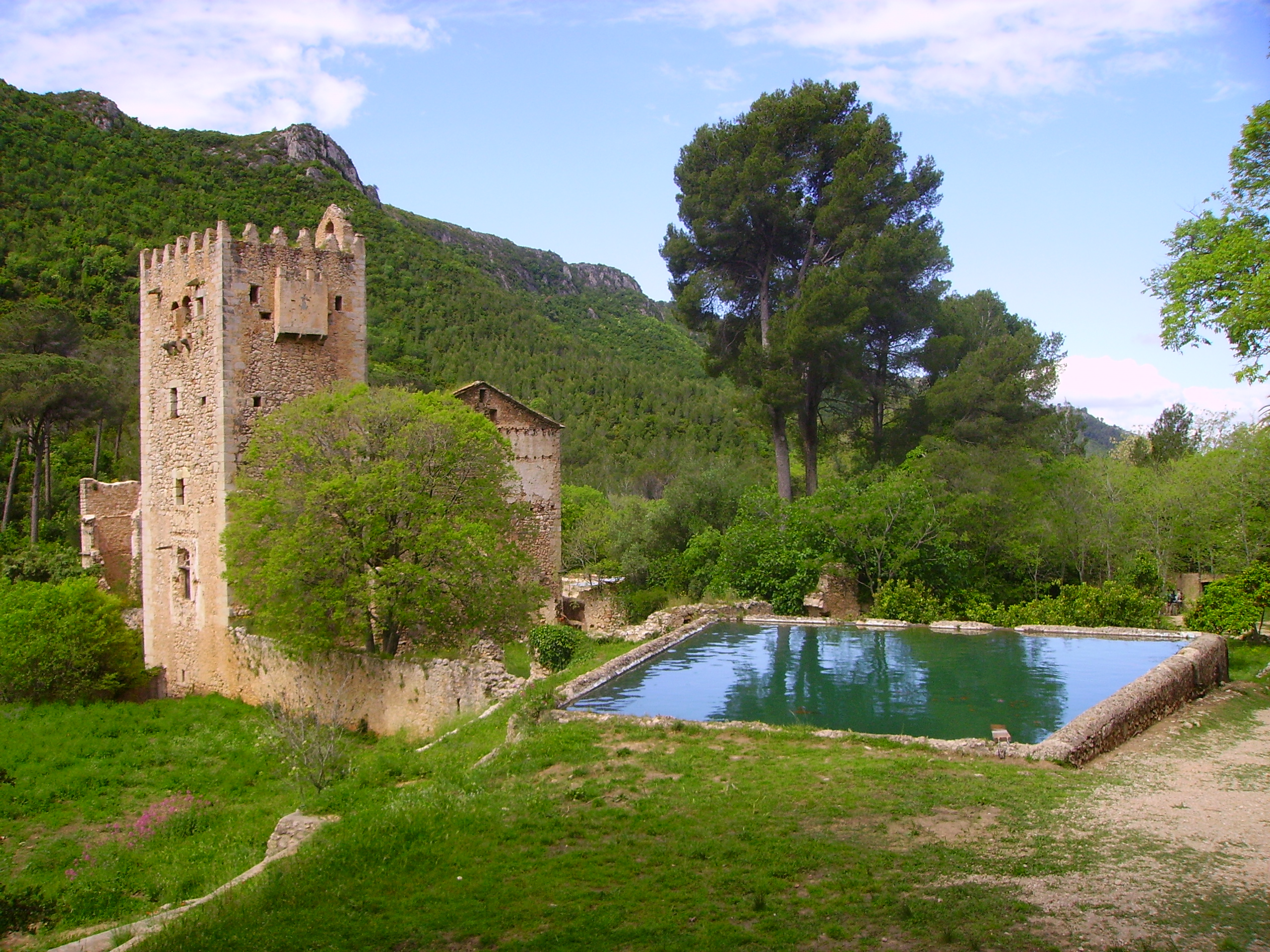
Murta monastery

- Monastery of la Murta: It is constituted of buildings rising in the following three periods: 11th to 15th century, 16th century, and 17th century. In the 19th century, after the expropriation, his new owner raised a manor over the hospice of the monastery. The Monastery also has a partition battlemented wall. Nowadays, In the garden. There are still remainders gathering in the walls. In that way, it has prepared to increase the defensive function. The elements of the group are: Monastery: The new church and the Tower of the Bells. Fortified tower of la Porteria. Ruins of the monastery and adjacent elements. Foster chapel of La Verge de la Murta, after it was a sacristy.
- Alzira walled circuit: The walls of Alzira were built around a possible river island, from which derives its name in Arabic (Al-Jazira: The Island) had a dual purpose, first the defense, and second the flood protection of Xúquer river. The walls were buried by the river, which floods the city from three to four times a year. The walled circuit was formed by a double wall which today contains the historical center of la Vila, dated in the Islamic period where some of the mosques and baths were settled. Nowadays, the remains are located in two areas of the city, el parc de les muralles and les muralles del Mercat Antic.
- Town council hall of Alzira: This building has a civil Gothic style of the Crown of Aragon. Its oldest part dates from the 16th century and, although we can say that the construction of its plant obeys to medieval patterns alternating the Ghotic style and the Baroque. It is a building with a quadrangular plant and a three water covered with Arabic tiles in whose construction the following local unions have collaborated: stonecutters, carpenters and mull wall. Its interior rooms are arranged around a rectangular gallery. In 1930 it was declared an Artistic National Monument
- Santa Caterina church of Alzira : The building was rebuilt in the 17th century on an earlier mosque, with a Gothic basilica and a Gothic factory. It is inserted into the so-called Reconquista churches with a single ground covered with a cannon vault open with lunettes and open chapels between buttresses, covered with a mid-cannon vault. Over the transept, a drum covered by a dome over scallops sets up. This was replaced by a new double-sloped roof that covers the entire temple
- Mare de Déu del Lluch Sanctuary of Alzira: Construction built in a neo-Romanesque style. The temple of three naves is covered with groin vault, while the major chapel is fixed with another kind of vault. The access is through a big door which emulates the Romanesque style on which there are three big windows topped by an oculus. They allow the entrance of the light inside of the enclosure. To the left, the bell tower rises separated into three sections and covered with pyramidal spire. In the central part of the second section, there are two windows which placed one above the other emphasizes the verticality of the entire monument. The third section separated from the previous one by a decorated wide strip includes the group of bells.
- Museum: Noble Gothic-Renaissance house that houses the Municipal Museum of Alzira. It brings together the cultural heritage of Alzira and the Ribera Alta, so it is possible to contemplate the evolutionary aspects under both, physical and human settlements established in the territory, from prehistory to the present day. It has interesting historical and artistic funds of the city and its region. Permanent exhibitions are divided into four sections: cartography, archeology, ethnology and history, and arts.

== Notable people ==
- Ibn Khafaja, Andalusi poet
- Raúl Albentosa, footballer
- Adrián Campos, Formula One driver and Campos Racing founder.
- Mónica Carrió, weightlifter
- Lorenzo Carrió, weightlifter
- Jorge Martínez, motorcycle racer
- Elisa Ramírez, actress
- Pedro Martínez, professional tennis player
- Juan J. Colomer, composer

== See also ==
- Route of the Monasteries of Valencia
- List of municipalities in Valencia
