= Jörg A. Eggers =

German film director

- Born: 15 June 1936 (age 89); Heidelberg, Germany
- Occupations: Film director, screenwriter
- Years active: 1965-1998

Jörg A. Eggers (born 15 June 1936) is a German film director and screenwriter. He directed 46 films between 1965 and 1998.

== Selected filmography ==
- I Want to Live (1976)
- Das Nest unter den Trümmern der Jahre (1982, TV film)
- Die Nacht der vier Monde (1984)
