= 67th Venice International Film Festival =

2010 Italian film festival

- Festival poster
- Opening film: Black Swan
- Closing film: The Tempest
- Location: Venice, Italy
- Founded: 1932
- Awards: Golden Lion: Somewhere
- Hosted by: Isabella Ragonese
- Artistic director: Marco Müller
- Festival date: 1 – 11 September 2010
- Website: Website

Venice Film Festival chronology
- 68th 66th

The 67th annual Venice International Film Festival, was held from 1 to 11 September 2010, at Venice Lido in Italy.

American filmmaker Quentin Tarantino was the jury president for the main competition. The Golden Lion was awarded to Somewhere by Sofia Coppola.

Chinese-Hong Kong filmmaker John Woo received the Golden Lion for Lifetime Achievement during the festival.

In a break with tradition of limiting a film to receiving no more than one major award, the Special Jury Prize and the Volpi Cup for Best Actor (Vincent Gallo) went to the same film, Jerzy Skolimowski's Essential Killing. In the past, no one film had been given two major awards. Representing the jury, American director Quentin Tarantino appealed to Festival head Marco Müller to alter the rules. This rule change continues to be upheld for future editions of the Festival. Following the Festival, Italian film critic Paolo Mereghetti criticized the decisions that the jury made in awarding prizes, and singled out Tarantino, accusing him of favoritism, which he denied.

The festival opened with Black Swan by Darren Aronofsky, and closed with The Tempest by Julie Taymor.

== Juries ==
=== Main Competition (Venezia 67) ===
- Quentin Tarantino, American filmmaker and actor - Jury President
- Guillermo Arriaga, Mexican filmmaker and producer
- Ingeborga Dapkūnaitė, Lithuanian actress
- Arnaud Desplechin, French filmmaker
- Danny Elfman, American composer, singer, songwriter and record producer
- Luca Guadagnino, Italian filmmaker
- Gabriele Salvatores, Italian filmmaker

=== Orizzonti ===
- Shirin Neshat, Iranian visual artist - Jury President
- Raja Amari, Tunisian director and script writer
- Lav Diaz, Filipino filmmaker
- Alexander Horwath, director of the Austrian Film Museum, former director of Viennale
- Pietro Marcello, Italian filmmaker

=== Opera Prima ("Luigi de Laurentiis" Award for a Debut Film) ===
- Fatih Akin, German filmmaker and producer - Jury President
- Nina Lath Gupta, Indian official of National Film Development Corporation of India
- Stanley Kwan, Hong Kong director and producer
- Samuel Maoz, Israeli director
- Jasmine Trinca, Italian actress

=== Controcampo Italiano ===
- Valerio Mastandrea, Italian actor - Jury President
- Susanna Nicchiarelli, Italian filmmaker and actress
- Dario Edoardo Viganò, Director of Vatican Television Center

=== Persol 3-D ===
- Shimizu Takashi, Japanese filmmaker - Jury President
- Jim Hoberman, American film critic and academic
- David Zamagni, Italian filmmaker

== Official Sections ==
=== In Competition ===
The following films were selected for the main competition:

| English title | Original title | Director(s) | Production Country |
|---|---|---|---|
| 13 Assassins | 十三人の刺客 | Takashi Miike | Japan, United Kingdom |
| Attenberg | | Athina Rachel Tsangari | Greece |
| Barney's Version | | Richard J. Lewis | Canada, Italy |
| Black Swan (opening film) | | Darren Aronofsky | United States |
| Black Venus | Vénus noire | Abdellatif Kechiche | France |
| Detective Dee and the Mystery of the Phantom Flame | 狄仁傑之通天帝國 | Tsui Hark | China |
| The Ditch | 夹边沟 | Wang Bing | China |
| Essential Killing | | Jerzy Skolimowski | Poland, Norway, Hungary, Ireland |
| Happy Few | | Antony Cordier | France |
| The Last Circus | Balada triste de trompeta | Álex de la Iglesia | Spain, France |
| Meek's Cutoff | | Kelly Reichardt | United States |
| Miral | | Julian Schnabel | United States, France, Italy, Israel |
| Norwegian Wood | ノルウェイの森 | Tran Anh Hung | Japan |
| La passione | | Carlo Mazzacurati | Italy |
| La pecora nera | | Ascanio Celestini | Italy |
| Post Mortem | | Pablo Larraín | Chile, Mexico, Germany |
| Potiche | | François Ozon | France |
| Promises Written in Water | | Vincent Gallo | United States |
| Road to Nowhere | | Monte Hellman | United States |
| Silent Souls | Овсянки | Aleksei Fedorchenko | Russia |
| The Solitude of Prime Numbers | La solitudine dei numeri primi | Saverio Costanzo | Italy, Germany, France |
| Somewhere | | Sofia Coppola | United States |
| Three | Drei | Tom Tykwer | Germany |
| We Believed | Noi credevamo | Mario Martone | Italy, France |

=== Out of Competition ===
The following films were selected to be screened out of competition:

| English title | Original title | Director(s) | Production Country |
|---|---|---|---|
| 1960 | | Gabriele Salvatores | Italy |
| All Inclusive 3D | | Nadia Ranocchi, David Zamagni | Italy |
| Angel of Evil | Vallanzasca - Gli angeli del male | Michele Placido | Italy |
| The Child's Eye | 童眼 | Oxide Pang Chun, Danny Pang | China |
| Dante Ferretti: production designer | | Gianfranco Giagni | Italy |
| Gorbaciof | Gorbaciof - Il cassiere col vizio del gioco | Stefano Incerti | Italy |
| I'm Still Here | | Casey Affleck | United States |
| Legend of the Fist: The Return of Chen Zhen | 精武風雲－陳真 | Andrew Lau | China（Hong Kong） |
| A Letter to Elia | | Martin Scorsese, Kent Jones | United States |
| Lope | | Andrucha Waddington | Spain, Brazil |
| Machete | | Robert Rodriguez | United States |
| | Niente paura | Piergiorgio Gay | Italy |
| News from the Excavations | Notizie degli scavi | Emidio Greco | Italy |
| Passione | | John Turturro | Italy |
| La prima volta a Venezia | | Antonello Sarno | Italy |
| Raavan | | Mani Ratnam | India |
| Reign of Assassins | 劍雨 | John Woo, Su Chao-pin | China |
| Sei Venezia | | Carlo Mazzacurati | Italy |
| The Shock Labyrinth | 戦慄迷宮 | Takashi Shimizu | Japan |
| Showtime | Yongxin Tiao | Stanley Kwan | China |
| Sorelle mai | | Marco Bellocchio | Italy |
| Space Guy | 太空侠3D | Zhang Yuan | China |
| Surviving Life | Přežít svůj život | Jan Švankmajer | Czech Republic |
| The Tempest (closing film) | | Julie Taymor | United States |
| That Girl in Yellow Boots | | Anurag Kashyap | India |
| The Town | | Ben Affleck | United States |
| L’ultimo gattopardo: ritratto di Goffredo Lombardo | | Giuseppe Tornatore | Italy |
| Zebraman 2: Attack on Zebra City | ゼブラーマン -ゼブラシティの逆襲 | Takashi Miike | Japan |

=== Orizzonti ===
From 2010 on, this section, dedicated to new trends in world cinema, has opened itself to all "extra-format" works, while four new awards have been established for it.

| English title | Original title | Director(s) | Production country |
In Competition
| Anti Gas Skin | 방독피 | Gok and Sun Kim | South Korea |
| Better Life | | Isaac Julien | United Kingdom, China |
| Caracremada | | Lluís Galter | Spain |
| Cold Fish | 冷たい熱帯魚 | Sion Sono | Japan |
| Dharma Guns | La succession Starkov | F. J. Ossang | France, Portugal |
| The House by the Medlar Tree | Malavoglia | Pasquale Scimeca | Italy |
| In the Future | En el futuro | Mauro Andrizzi | Argentina |
| Jean Gentil | | Laura Amelia Guzmán and Israel Cárdenas | Dominican Rep., Mexico, Germany |
| Nainsukh | | Amit Dutta | Switzerland, India |
| News from Nowhere | | Paul Morrissey | United States |
| Oki's Movie (Closing Film) | 옥희의 영화 | Hong Sang-soo | South Korea |
| The Sleeping Beauty (Opening Film) | La belle endormie | Catherine Breillat | France |
| Summer of Goliath | Verano de Goliat | Nicolás Pereda | Mexico, Canada |
| The Sword and the Rose | A Espada e a Rosa | João Nicolau | Portugal, France |
Documentaries
| Fading | | Olivier Zabat | France |
| The Forgotten Space | | Noël Burch, Allan Sekula | Netherlands, Austria |
| Guest | | José Luis Guerín | Spain |
| The Nine Muses | | John Akomfrah | United Kingdom, Ghana |
| Per questi stretti morire (Ovvero cartografia di una passione) | | Giuseppe M. Gaudino, Isabella Sandri | Italy |
| Reconstructing Faith | 西方去此不远 | Wenhai Huang | China |
| Robinson in Ruins | | Patrick Keiller | United Kingdom |
| El Sicario, Room 164 | | Gianfranco Rosi | France, Italy |
| When We Were Communists | Sheoeyin kenna | Maher Abi Samra | Lebanon, France, United Arab Emirates |
| Zelal | | Marianne Khoury, Mustapha Hasnaoui | Egypt, France |
Out of Competition
| K.364 a Journey by Train | | Douglas Gordon | United Kingdom, France |
Short Films - Competition
| 21 Grams | 21 克 | Xun Sun | China |
| 720 Degrees | | Ishtiaque Zico | Bangladesh |
| The Agent | | Vincent Gallo | United States |
| Casus Belli | | Georgios Zois | Greece |
| Diamonds (Brilianty) | | Rustam Khamdamov | Russia |
| The External World | | David Oreilly | Germany |
| Four Seasons | Nok Ka Mhin | Chaisiri Jiwarangsan | Thailand |
| John's Gone | | Josh & Benny Safdie | United States |
| The Life and Death of Henry Darger | Lif og Daudi Henry Darger | Bertrand Mandico | France, Iceland |
| Man In A Room | | Rafael Palacio Illingworth | United States, Mexico, Switzerland |
| Mechanic of Spring | Haru No Shikumi | Atsushi Wada | Japan |
| Out | Tse | Roee Rosen | Israel |
| Painéis de São Vicente de Fora, visão poética | | Manoel De Oliveira | Portugal |
| El Pozo | | Guillermo Arriaga | Mexico |
| Red Earth | 赤地 | Clara Law | China（Hong Kong）, Australia |
| Woman I | | Nuntanat Duangtisarn | Thailand |
Short Experimental Films
| Atom | | Markus Loeffler, Andrée Korpys | Germany |
| Les Barbares | | Jean-Gabriel Périot | France |
| Cold Clay, Emptiness... | | Sj. Ramir | New Zealand |
| Coming Attractions | | Peter Tscherkassky | Austria |
| The Death of an Insect | Erään Hyönteisen Tuho | Hannes Vartiainen, Pekka Veikkolainen | Finland |
| Diane Wellington | | Arnaud Des Pallières | France |
| The Futurist | | Emily Richardson | United Kingdom |
| House | | Doug Aitken | United States |
| Inspiration | Voodhushevlenie | Galina Myznikova, Sergey Provorov | Russia |
| La linea generale | | Oleg Tcherny | France |
| Mc Mclean, Magic For Beginners | | Jesse Mclean | United States |
| Mouse Palace | | Harald Hund, Paul Horn | Austria |
| O Mundo é Belo | | Luiz Pretti | Brazil |
| Non si può nulla contro il vento | | Flatform | Italy |
| Shadow Cuts | | Martin Arnold | Austria |
| Stardust | | Nicolas Provost | Belgium |
| Weak Rot Front | Slabyj Rot Front | Victor Alimpiev | Russia |
Short Documentaries Films
| Il Capo | | Yuri Ancarani | Italy |
| Crust | 壳 | Wenhai Huang | China |
| Future Archaeology | | Armin Linke, Francesco Mattuzzi | Italy, Germany |
| On Rubik's Road | Pa Rubika Celu | Laila Pakalnina | Latvia |
| Indefatigable | | Ruth Jarman, Joe Gerhardt | Ecuador, United Kingdom |
| How To Pick Berries | Miten Marjoja Poimitaan | Elina Talvensaari | Finland |
| The Future Will Not Be Capitalism | | Sasha Pirker | Austria |
Short Films - Out of Competition
| The Leopard | | Isaac Julien | United Kingdom, Italy |
| A Loft | | Ken Jacobs | United States |
| Un Anno Dopo – Progetto Memory Hunters | | Carlo Liberatore, a.o. | Italy |

=== Controcampo Italiano ===
The following films, representing "new trends in Italian cinema", were screened in this section:

| English title | Original title | Director(s) |
Feature films
| 20 Cigarettes | 20 Sigarette | Aureliano Amadei |
| The First Assignment | Il Primo Incarico | Giorgia Cecere |
| Into Paradiso | | Paola Randi |
| Lost Kisses (Opening Film) | I baci mai dati | Roberta Torre |
| Ma che storia... | | Gianfranco Pannone |
| Tajabone | | Salvatore Mereu |
| A Woman | | Giada Colagrande |
Short films
| Achille | | Giorgia Farina |
| Bassa Marea | | Roberto De Paolis |
| Come Un Soffio | | Michela Cescon |
| Niente Orchidee | | Simone Godano, Leonardo Godano |
| Sposerò Nichi Vendola | | Andrea Costantino |
Out of competition
| Flaiano: Il meglio è passato | | Giancarlo Rolandi, Steve Della Casa |
| Fughe e approdi | | Giovanna Taviani |
| Late Summer | Tarda estate | Antonio Di Trapani, Marco De Angelis |
| Il Loro Natale | | Gaetano Di Vaio |
| Se hai una montagna di neve, tienila all'ombra | | Elisabetta Sgarbi, Eugenio Lio |
| Ward 54 | | Monica Maggioni |

=== Italian Retrospective ===
The following films were shown as part of a retrospective section on Italian comedy, titled The State of Things, spanning the years 1937 to 1988.

| English title | Italian title | Director(s) |
|---|---|---|
| Three Fables of Love (1962) | Le quattro verità | Alessandro Blasetti |
| Non ti pago! (1942) | | Carlo Ludovico Bragaglia |
| I cuori infranti (1963) | | Vittorio Caprioli |
| Beach House (1977) | Casotto | Sergio Citti |
| Io non spezzo... rompo (1971) | | Bruno Corbucci |
| Il domestico (1974) | | Luigi Filippo D'Amico |
| The Make Believe Pirates (1937) | Allegri masnadieri | Marco Elter |
| Tutta la città canta (1945) | | Riccardo Freda |
| Catch as Catch Can (1967) | Lo scatenato | Franco Indovina |
| Imputato alzatevi! (1939) | | Mario Mattoli |
| The Knight Has Arrived! (1950) | È arrivato il cavaliere! | Mario Monicelli, Steno |
| Cops and Robbers (1951) | Guardie e ladri | Mario Monicelli, Steno |
| Fracchia la belva umana (1981) | | Neri Parenti |
| L'onorata società (1961) | | Riccardo Pazzaglia |
| The Bachelor (1955) | Lo scapolo | Antonio Pietrangeli |
| Il ragazzo di campagna (1984) | | Castellano & Pipolo |
| Il commissario Lo Gatto (1986) | | Dino Risi |
| The Thursday (1963) | Il giovedì | Dino Risi |
| Le pillole di Ercole (1960) | | Luciano Salce |
| I'm in the Revue (1950) | Botta e risposta | Mario Soldati |
| A Day in Court (1953) | Un giorno in pretura | Steno |
| Febbre da cavallo (1976) | | Steno |
| His Women (1961) | Il mantenuto | Ugo Tognazzi |
| Eccezzziunale... veramente (1982) | | Carlo Vanzina |
| Vacanze di Natale (1983) | | Carlo Vanzina |
| Compagni di scuola (1988) | | Carlo Verdone |

== Independent Sections ==
=== Venice International Film Critics' Week ===
The following films were selected for the 25th International Film Critics' Week:

| English title | Original title | Director(s) | Production Country |
In competition
| Afraid of the Dark | Hai paura del buio | Massimo Coppola | Italy |
| Angel & Tony | Angèle et Tony | Alix Delaporte | France |
| Beyond | Svinalängorna | Pernilla August | Sweden |
| Dad | Oca | Vlado Škafar | Slovenia |
| Homeland | Hora Proelefsis | Syllas Tzoumerkas | Greece |
| Martha | | Marcelino Islas Hernández | Mexico |
| Naomi | Hitparzut X | Eitan Zur | Israel |
Out of competition
| Italian Night (Opening film) | Notte Italiana | Carlo Mazzacurati | Italy |
| The Bridal Quarter (Closing film) | Limbunan | Gutierrez Mangansakan II | Philippines |

=== Venice Days ===
The following films were selected for the 7th edition of Venice Days (Giornate Degli Autori) autonomous section:

| English title | Original title | Director(s) | Production country |
In competition
| Heaven Without Earth | Cielo Senza Terra | Giovanni Maderna & Sara Pozzoli | Italy |
| Circus Columbia | Cirkus Columbia | Danis Tanović | Bosnia and Herzegovina |
| Majority | Cogunluk | Seren Yüce | Turkey |
| And Peace on Earth | Et in terra pax | Matteo Botrugno & Daniele Coluccini | Italy |
| The Green Blood | Il sangue verde | Andrea Segre | Italy, France |
| Incendies | | Denis Villeneuve | Canada, France |
| Dark Love | L’amore buio | Antonio Capuano | Italy |
| The Life of Fish | La vida de los peces | Matías Bize | Chile, France |
| Life in the Time of Death | La vita al tempo della morte | Andrea Caccia | Italy |
| The Clink of Ice | Le bruit des glaçons | Bertrand Blier | France |
| Lisetta Carmi, a Soul on the Road | Lisetta Carmi, un'anima in cammino | Daniele Segre | Italy |
| Ocean Black | Noir océan | Marion Hänsel | Belgium, Germany, France |
| The Place in Between | Notre étrangère | Sarah Bouyain | France, Burkina Faso |
| Little Voices | Pequeñas voces | Jairo Eduardo Carrillo & Oscar Andrade | Colombia |
| Scena del crimine | | Walter Stokman | Netherlands, Italy |
| The Accordion | | Jafar Panahi | Italy, Brazil, France, Switzerland |
| The Happy Poet | | Paul Gordon | United States |
Lux Prize
| Plato‘s Academy | Akadimia Platonos | Filippos Tsitos | Greece, Germany |
| When We Leave | Die Fremde | Feo Aladag | Germany |
| Illegal | Illégal | Olivier Masset-Depasse | Belgium, Luxembourg, France |

== Official Awards ==
Starting with the 67th edition of the festival, four new awards were established for the Orizzonti section: the Orizzonti Award (for feature films), the Special Jury Orizzonti Prize (for feature films), the Orizzonti Award for Short Experimental Films and the Orizzonti Award for Short/Medium-length Films.

The Golden Lion was won by Somewhere, directed by Sofia Coppola, a film based in part on Coppola's childhood as the daughter of acclaimed American director Francis Ford Coppola. Quentin Tarantino, the president of the jury that awarded the prize, hailed the film saying, "it grew and grew in our hearts, in our minds, in our affections". The jury's decision was unanimous. Upon receiving the award, Coppola paid credit to her father for "teaching me". The Russian film Silent Souls and the Chilean film Post Mortem had been considered favorites for the award.

=== In Competition (Venezia 67) ===
- Golden Lion: Somewhere by Sofia Coppola
- Silver Lion for Best Director: Álex de la Iglesia for The Last Circus
- Special Jury Prize: Essential Killing by Jerzy Skolimowski
- Volpi Cup for Best Actor: Vincent Gallo for Essential Killing
- Volpi Cup for Best Actress: Ariane Labed for Attenberg
- Marcello Mastroianni Award: Mila Kunis for Black Swan
- Golden Osella for Best Cinematography: Mikhail Krichman for Silent Souls
- Golden Osella for Best Screenplay: Álex de la Iglesia for The Last Circus
- Special Lion: Monte Hellman

=== Golden Lion for Lifetime Achievement ===
- John Woo

=== Horizons (Orizzonti) ===
- Orizzonti Award: Summer of Goliath by Nicolás Pereda
- Special Jury Orizzonti Prize: The Forgotten Space by Noël Burch and Allan Sekula
- Orizzonti Award for Short Experimental Films: Coming Attractions by Peter Tcherkassky
- Orizzonti Award for Short/Medium-length Films: Tse (Out) by Roee Rosen
  - Special Mention: Jean Gentil by Laura Amelia Guzmán and Israel Cárdenas
- Venice Short Film Nominee for the European Film Awards: The External World by David Oreilly

=== Controcampo Italiano ===
- Best Film: 20 Cigarettes by Aureliano Amadei
  - Special Mention: Vinicio Marchioni for his role in 20 Cigarettes

=== Luigi de Laurentis Award for a Debut Film ===
- Majority by Seren Yüce

=== Special awards ===
- Jaeger-Le Coultre Glory to the Filmmaker Award: Mani Ratnam
- Persol 3-D Award for Best Stereoscopic Film: Avatar by James Cameron
- L’Oréal Paris for the Cinema Award: Vittoria Puccini

== Independent Sections Awards ==
=== Venice International Film Critics' Week ===
- "Region of Veneto for quality cinema" Award: Beyond by Pernilla August
- Christopher D. Smithers Foundation Special Award: Beyond by Pernilla August

=== Venice Days (Giornati degli Autori) ===
- Label Europa Cinemas Award: The Clink of Ice by Bertrand Blier
  - Special Mention: Incendies by Denis Villeneuve
- Biografilm Lancia Award: Incendies by Denis Villeneuve
- Lanterna Magica Award (Cgs): Dark Love by Antonio Capuano
- FEDIC Award: Dark Love by Antonio Capuano
  - Special Mention: Afraid of the Dark by Massimo Coppola
- AIF Forfilmfest Award: Dark Love by Antonio Capuano
- Gianni Astrei Award: Dark Love by Antonio Capuano
- Cinema.Doc - Venice Days Selection: Il Sangue verde by Andrea Segre

== Independent Awards ==
The following collateral awards were conferred to films of the official selection:

=== FIPRESCI Award ===
- Best Film (Main competition): Silent Souls by Aleksei Fedorchenko
- Best Film (Horizons): El sicario Room 164 by Gianfranco Rosi

=== Queer Lion ===
- In the Future by Mauro Andrizzi

=== SIGNIS Award ===
- Meek's Cutoff by Kelly Reichardt
  - Special Mention: Silent Souls by Aleksei Fedorchenko

=== Francesco Pasinetti Award (SNGCI) ===
- Best Film: 20 Cigarettes by Aureliano Amadei
- Best Actress: Alba Rohrwacher for The Solitude of Prime Numbers

=== CICAE Award ===
- Sleeping Beauty by Catherine Breillat

=== Leoncino d'oro Agiscuola Award ===
- Barney’s Version by Richard J. Lewis

=== Cinema for UNICEF Commendation ===
- Miral by Julian Schnabel

=== La Navicella – Venezia Cinema Award ===
- The Ditch by Wang Bing

=== C.I.C.T. UNESCO Enrico Fulchignoni Award ===
- Miral by Julian Schnabel

=== Biografilm Lancia Award ===
- I'm Still Here by Casey Affleck
- A Letter to Elia by Martin Scorsese & Kent Jones
- Surviving Life by Jan Švankmajer
- 20 Cigarettes by Aureliano Amadei
- El Sicario - Room 164 by Gianfranco Rosi

=== Nazareno Taddei Award ===
- Silent Souls by Aleksei Fedorchenko

=== CinemAvvenire Award ===
- Essential Killing by Jerzy Skolimowski

=== CinemAvvenire "Il cerchio non è rotondo" Award ===
- Cirkus Columbia by Danis Tanović

=== Equal Opportunity Award ===
- Black Venus by Abdellatif Kechiche

=== Future Film Festival Digital Award ===
- Detective Dee and the Mystery of the Phantom Flame by Tsui Hark
  - Special Mention: Zebraman 2: Attack on Zebra City & 13 Assassins by Miike Takashi

=== Brian Award ===
- Lost Kisses by Roberta Torre

=== Arca Cinemagiovani Award ===
- The Last Circus by Álex de la Iglesia

=== Roberto Bognanno Prize ===
- Potiche by François Ozon

=== Lina Mangiacapre Award ===
- Attenberg by Athina Rachel Tsangari
  - Special Mention: Jafar Panahi for The Accordion (short)

=== UK - Italy Creative Industries Award – Best Innovative Budget ===
- Tajabone by Salvatore Mereu

=== Fondazione Mimmo Rotella ===
- La pecora nera by Ascanio Celestini

=== Premio Selezione Cinema.Doc - Official Selection ===
- El sicario room 164 by Gianfranco Rosi

=== Golden Mouse ===
- Silent Souls by Aleksei Fedorchenko

=== Silver Mouse ===
- Incendies by Denis Villeneuve
