= Films about immigration to Italy =

The filmography on immigration in Italy is a phenomenon started with the arrival of the first migratory flows in Italy, since the 1990s.

== Italian films ==
=== 1988 - 1999 ===
- Emir Kusturica, Time of the Gypsies (United Kingdom/Italy/Yugoslavia, 1988)
- Michele Placido, Pummarò (Italy, 1990)
- Marcello Bivona, Clandestini nella città (Italy/Tunisia, 1992)
- Claudio Fragasso, Teste rasate (Italy, 1993)
- Gianni Amelio, Lamerica (Italy/France/Switzerland, 1994)
- Maurizio Zaccaro, Article 2 – L’Articolo 2 - (Italy, 1994)
- Renzo Martinelli, The Waterbaby - Sarahsarà (Italy, 1994)
- Various directors, Intolerance (Italy, 1996)
- Carlo Mazzacurati, Vesna Goes Fast (Italy/France, 1996)
- Matteo Garrone, Terra di mezzo (Italy, 1996)
- Massimo Martelli, Pole pole (Italy, 1996)
- Rachid Benhadj, Another Country in My Eyes : The Tree of Hanging Destinies - L’albero dei destini sospesi (Italy, 1997)
- Bernardo Bertolucci, Besieged (Italy/United Kingdom, 1998)
- Mohammed Hammoussi, Permesso di soggiorno (Italy, 1998)
- Luigi Faccini, Giamaica (Italy, 1998)
- Matteo Garrone, Guests - Ospiti (Italy, 1998)

=== 2000 - 2009 ===
- Corso Salani, West - Occidente (Italy, 2000)
- Marco Manetti and Antonio Manetti, Zora the Vampire (Italy, 2000)
- Vincenzo Marra, Sailing Home - Tornando a casa (Italy, 2001)
- Gianluca Greco, Nemmeno in un sogno (Italy, 2001)
- Ennio De Dominicis, L’italiano (Italy, 2001)
- Edmund Budina, Letters in the Wind (Italy, 2002)
- Enrica Colosso, Chi non rischia non beve champagne (Italy, 2002)
- Alessandro Benvenuti, Do You Mind If I Kiss Mommy? (Italy, 2003)
- Francesco Munzi, Saimir (Italy, 2004)
- Enrico Verra, Sotto il sole nero (Italy, 2004)
- Vittorio De Seta, Letters from the Sahara - Lettere dal Sahara (Italy, 2005)
- Marco Tullio Giordana, Once You're Born You Can No Longer Hide (Italy, 2005)
- Giorgio Diritti, Il vento fa il suo giro (Italy, 2005)
- Daniele Vicari, L'orizzonte degli eventi (Italy, 2005)
- Carmine Amoroso, Cover Boy (Italy, 2006)
- Vittorio Moroni, Le ferie di Licu (Italy, 2006)
- Costanza Quatriglio, Il mondo addosso (Italy, 2006)
- Carlo Mazzacurati, La giusta distanza (Italy, 2007)
- Mohsen Melliti, I, the Other (Italy, 2007)
- Marco Simon Puccioni, Shelter Me (aka Riparo) (Italy, 2007)
- Claudio Cupellini, Lezioni di cioccolato (Italy, 2007)
- Laura Muscardin, Billo - Il grand Dakhaar (Italy/Senegal, 2007)
- Paolo Genovese and Luca Miniero, This Night Is Still Ours (Italy, 2008)
- Cristina Comencini, Bianco e nero (Italy, 2008)
- Federico Bondi, Black Sea (Italy/France/Romania, 2008)
- Nello La Marca, La Terramadre (Italy, 2008)
- Enrico Pitzianti, Tutto torna (Italy, 2008)
- Francesco Munzi, The Rest of the Night - Il resto della notte (Italy, 2008)
- Mohamed Zineddaine, Tu te souviens d'Adil? - Ti ricordi di Adil? (Morocco/Italia, 2008)
- Marco Campogiani, The Right Thing - La cosa giusta (Italy, 2009)
- Razi Mohebi, Reame del Nulla (Italy, 2009)
- Claudio Noce, Good morning Aman (Italy, 2009)

=== 2010 - 2019 ===
- Isotta Toso, Scontro di civiltà per un ascensore in Piazza Vittorio (Italy, 2010)
- Paola Randi, Into Paradiso (Italy, 2010)
- Andrea Segre, Il Sangue verde (Italy, 2010)
- Pino Esposito, Il nuovo sud dell'Italia (Italy/Switzerland, 2010)
- Razi Mohebi, Gridami (Italy, 2010)
- Peter Del Monte, The Ballad of the Windshield Washers (Italy, 2010)
- Marco Turco, La straniera (Italy, 2010)
- Ricky Tognazzi, The Father and the Foreigner (Italy, 2010)
- Massimo Coppola, Afraid of the Dark (Bruises) - Hai paura del buio (Italy, 2010) – TV Movie
- Stefano Incerti, Gorbaciof (Italy, 2010)
- Alessio Maria Federici, Lezioni di cioccolato 2 (Italy, 2011)
- Claudia Palazzi and Clio Sozzani, Jeans and Martò (Italy, 2011)
- Francesco Patierno, Things from Another World (Italy, 2011)
- Andrea Segre, Shun Li and the Poet (Italy/France, 2011)
- Emanuele Crialese, Terraferma (Italy/France, 2011)
- Anis Gharbi, To Paradise (Italy, 2011)
- Ermanno Olmi, The Cardboard Village (Italy, 2011)
- Martina Parenti and Massimo D’Anolfi, Il castello (Italy, 2011)
- Guido Lombardi, Là-bas: A Criminal Education (Italy, 2011)
- Lorenzo Ceva Valla Mario Garofalo, Ainom (Italy, 2011)
- Gianluca De Serio, Massimiliano De Serio, Sette opere di misericordia (Italy/Romania, 2011)
- Mary Griggion, Sotto lo stesso Cielo (Italy, 2012)
- Peter Marcias, Dimmi che destino avrò (Italy, 2012)
- Paolo Bianchini, Il sole dentro (Italy, 2012)
- Filippo Grilli, La sabbia nelle tasche (Italy, 2012)
- Francesco Castellani, Black star. Nati sotto una stella nera (Italy, 2012)
- Claudio Giovannesi, Alì Blue Eyes (Italy, 2012)
- Antonio Bellia, Il santo nero (Italy, 2013)
- Andrea Segre, First Snowfall (Italy, 2013)
- Daniele Gaglianone, My Class (Italy, 2013)
- Alessandro Gassman, Razzabastarda (Italy, 2013)
- Haider Rashid, Sta per piovere (Italy/Iraq, 2013)
- Laura Halilovic, Me Romantic Romani (Italy, 2014)
- Antonio Augugliaro, Gabriele Del Grande and Khaled Soliman Al Nassiry, On the Bride's Side (Italy, 2014)
- Pupi Avati, Con il sole negli occhi (Italy, 2015) – TV Movie
- Laura Bispuri, Sworn Virgin (Italy/Switzerland/France/Germany/Albania/Kosovo, 2015)
- Gianfranco Rosi, Fire at Sea (Italy, 2016)
- Suranga Deshapriya Katugampala, Per un figlio (Italy/Sri Lanka, 2016)
- Phaim Bhuyian, Bangla (Italy, 2019)
- Roberto San Pietro, The Vegetarian - Il vegetariano (Italy, 2019)
- Giulio Base, Bar Jospeph - Bar Giuseppe (Italy, 2019)

=== 2020 - ===
- Marco Pontecorvo and Claudio Amendola, Carlo & Malik - Nero a metà - television series (2018-2022)
- Luciano Manuzzi, Mom to Hundreds - Tutto il giorno davanti (2020)
- Maurizio Zaccaro, Nour, (2020)
- Hleb Papou, The Legionnaire – Il legionario (2021)
- Claudio Rossi Massimi, The Right to Happiness - Il diritto alla felicità (2021)
- Mario Vitale, L'afide e la formica (2021)

== Other films ==
- Olivia Lamasan, Milan (Philippines, 2004)
- Valeriu Jereghi, Arrivederci (Moldova, 2008)
- Thomas Ciulei, Il ponte di fiori (Podul de Flori) (Romania/Germany, 2008)
- Mark A. Reyes, I.T.A.L.Y. (I Trust and Love You) (Philippines, 2008)
- Bobby Paunescu, Francesca (Romania, 2009)
- Dyana Gaye, Under the Starry Sky - Des Étoiles (France, 2013)
- Ben Sombogaart, Rafaël, (Netherlands/Belgium/Croatia, 2018)

== Italian short films and documentaries ==
=== 1992 - 1999 ===
- Hatem Abed, Roma profuma di nuove spezie, 19’
- Arnaldo Catinari, Shish Mahal (Italy, 1992) 28’
- Mino Crocè, L'altro aspetto (Italy, 1992) 14’
- Monica Stambrini, Vorrei urlare (Italy, 1994) 13’
- Gianfranco Galiè, Tutti i colori del cielo (Italy, 1994) 60’
- Marcello Casarini, La ruota spezzata (Italy, 1995) 50’
- Stefano Monticelli, Su-nu-gal: la nostra piroga (Italy, 1996) 40’
- Quirino Di Paolo, Il tempo di ascoltare (Italy, 1996) 20’
- Maurizio Pasetti, Andrea Rossini, Cartoline dalla Jugoslavia - Rom Khorakhané a Brescia, 1991-1996 (Italy, 1997) 23’

=== 2000 - 2009 ===
- Alessandro Angelini, Ragazzi del Ghana (Italy, 2000) 43’
- Armando Ceste, Abdellah e i suoi fratelli (Italy, 2000) 56’
- Jacopo Quadri, Mario Martone, Un posto al mondo (Italy, 2000) 76’
- Vincenzo Mancuso, Tra Genova e Fez. Una famiglia in viaggio (Italy, 2002) 49’
- Michele Carrillo, Tra due terre (Italy, 2005) 70’
- Mario Garofalo, Jasmine (Italy, 2005) 14’
- Claudio Bozzatello, Foku - Fuoco Sporco (Italy, 2005) 18’40’’
- Christian Bonatesta, Approdo Italia (Italy, 2005)
- Armando Ceste, Love difference (Italy, 2006) 25’
- Massimiliano Pacifico and Diego Liguori, Cricket Cup (Italy, 2006) 49’
- Agostino Ferrente, L’orchestra di Piazza Vittorio (Italy, 2006) 93’
- Nene Griffagnini and Francesco Conversano, Partire, Ritornare. In viaggio con Tahar Ben Jelloun (Italy, 2007) 50’
- Claudio Giovannesi, Welcome Bucarest (Italy, 2007) 40'
- Andrea Deaglio, Nera. Non è la terra promessa (Italy, 2007) 22’
- Federico Ferrone, Michele Manzolini, Francesco Ragazzi, Merica! (Italy, 2007) 65’
- Dagmawi Yimer, Sintayehu Eshetu, Solomon Moges, Menghistu Andechal, Adam Awad, Il deserto e il mare (Italy, 2007) 60’
- Carlotta Ehremberg, Dietro la porta (Italy, 2007) 6’
- Laye Gaye, Life in the city (Italy, 2008) 30’
- Andrea Segre, Riccardo Biadene and Dagmawi Yimer, Come un uomo sulla terra (Italy, 2008) 60’
- Marco Segato, Via Anelli, la chiusura del ghetto (Italy, 2008) 68'
- Filippo Meneghetti, Maistrac - Lavorare in Cantiere (Italy, 2008) 55’
- Marco Simon Puccioni, Il colore delle parole (Italy, 2009), 70’
- Lemnaouer Ahmine, La trappola (Italy/Algeria, 2009), 54’
- Antonio Martino, Nìguri (Italy, 2009) 50’
- Simone Amendola, Alisya nel Paese delle Meraviglie (Italy, 2009), 38’
- Edoardo Winspeare, Sotto il Celio Azzurro (Italy, 2009) 80’
- Andrea Solieri and Cristiano Regina, Liberi altrove, (Italy, 2009) 20’
- Andrea D'Ambrosio and Maurizio Cartolano, Campania burning (Italy, 2009) 60’
- Rossella Piccinno, Hanna e Violka (Italy/Polonia, 2009) 56’
- Riccardo Cremona, Vincenzo De Cecco, Miss little China (Italy, 2009)
- Enrico Montalbano, Angela Giardina, Ilaria Sposito, La Terra (e)strema (Italy, 2009) 55’

=== 2010 - ===
- Dagmawi Yimer, C.A.R.A. Italia (Etiopia/Italia, 2010)
- Jacopo Tartarone, Hermanitos, fratelli d'Italia (Italy, 2010)
- Dagmawi Yimer, Fabrizio Barraco and Giulio Cederna, Soltanto il mare (Italy, 2010)
- Dario Leone, Adina e Dumitra (Italy, 2010) 5’
- Gabriele Borghi, Lettera a Natasha (Italy, 2010) 8’20’’
- Anna Bernasconi and Giulia Ciniselli, Via Padova – Istruzioni per l’uso (Italy, 2010) 52’
- Bepi Vigna, Atteros: breve viaggio nel mondo dell'immigrazione (Italy, 2010) 49’30’’
- Luca Romano, Francesco Amodeo, Armando Andria, Mario Leonbruno, Non è un paese per neri (Italy, 2010) 52’
- Federico Greco, MEI [MEIG] Voci Migranti (Italy, 2010) 50’
- Gianfranco Marino, Life in Italy is Ok - Emergency Programma Italia (Italy, 2011), 38’
- Diego Garbini and Toni Garbini, Un luogo comune (Italy, 2011), 44’
- Ilyess Ben Chouikha and Giulia Bondi, Harraguantanamo (Italy, 2011) 5’
- Matteo Calore and Stefano Collizzolli, I nostri anni migliori (Italy, 2011) 46’
- Aluk Amiri, Hamed Dera, Hevi Dilara, Zakaria Mohamed Ali e Dagmawi Yimer, Benvenuti in Italia (Italy, 2011) 60’
- Mariangela Barbanente, Ferrhotel (Italy, 2011) 73’
- Imad Al Hunaiti, Eranga Hettiwatte, Nizar Jelassi, Anita Magno, Tomo Sulejmanovic, Patrizia Maiorana, Giuseppe Minolfi, Libera tutti (Italy, 2011) 109’
- Lemnaouer Ahmine and Francesco Cannito, La curt de l'America (Italy, 2011) 52’
- Alvaro Lanciai, Locked in Limbo (Italy, 2011), 61’
- Annamaria Gallone, Le due storie di Adamà (Italy, 2011), 50’
- Juan Martin Baigorria and Lisa Tormena, Aicha è tornata (Italy, 2011), 33’
- Fred Kudjo Kuwornu, 18 Ius soli (Italy, 2011) 50’
- Adil Tanani, Il debito del mare (Italy, 2011) 15’
- Harvinder Sing, Saverio Paoletta, Tan kosh (progetto I cinque favoriti) (2011) 52’
- Franco Basaglia, Le perle di ritorno (Italy, 2011) 62’
- Francesco Cannito, Luca Cusani, Lemnaouer Ahmine, Il rifugio (Italy, 2011) 65’
- Simone Brioni, Graziano Chiscuzzu, Ermanno Guida, La quarta via. Mogadiscio, Italia (Italy, 2012) 37'
- Simone Brioni, Graziano Chiscuzzu, Ermanno Guida, Aulò. Roma Postcoloniale (Italy, 2012) 47'
- Maura Delpero, Nadea e Sveta (Italy, 2012) 62’
- Stefano Liberti and Andrea Segre, Mare chiuso (Italy, 2012)
- Daniele Vicari, La nave dolce (Italy, 2012)
- Simone Amendola, Padrone bravo (Italy, 2012), 48’
- Mattia Levratti and Alessandro Levratti, La prigione degli altri (2012) 21’
- Cristian Sabatelli, Pippo Cariglia, L'altra città (2012) 38’
- Martin Errichiello and Gabriele Sossella, Arcipelaghi (Italy, 2012) 18’
- Cinzia Castania, Mineo Housing (Italy, 2012), 59’
- Alessandro Grande, Margerita (Italy, 2013), 15’
- Dagmawi Yimer, Va’ Pensiero, storie ambulanti (2013)
- Alessio Genovese and Raffaella Cosentino, EU 013, l'ultima frontiera (Italy, 2013) 62’
- Stefano Mencherini, Schiavi (Italy, 2013)
- Stefano Liberti, Enrico Parenti, Container 158 (Italy, 2013), 62’
- Morteza Kaleghi, La polvere di Kabul
- Giusy Buccheri and Michele Citoni, Il futuro è troppo grande, (Italy, 2014) 75’
- Andrea Segre, Come il peso dell'acqua (Italy, 2014), 110'
- David Fedele, The Land Between (Italy, 2014) 78’
- Paolo Martino, Terra di transito (Italy, 2014), 54’
- Marcello Merletto, Wallah Je te jure (Niger, Senegal, Italy, 2016), 63'
- R. Benbrik, E. Colanero, R. Danise, A. Riccardi, S. Tali, T. Fischer, Fuori fuoco (Italy, 2018), 78'

== See also ==
- Immigration to Italy
- Forced displacement in popular culture

== Awards and Film Festivals ==
- Festival del cinema africano, d'Asia e America Latina, Milan
- Festival Cinéma et Migrations, Agadir
- Terra di tutti Film Festival, Bologna
- Lampedusa in Festival, Lampedusa
- Festival del Cinema dei Diritti Umani, Naples
- Festival di cinema africano Verona
- Premio Mutti – AMM, per il Cinema migrante
- RIACEinFESTIVAL - Festival delle Migrazioni e delle Culture locali, Riace
- Bando internazionale per cortometraggi sull'immigrazione
- Festival migrantskega filma - Festival of Migrant Film, Ljubljana
- Rassegna Crocevia di sguardi. Documentari e approfondimenti per capire le migrazioni, Turin

== Bibliography ==
=== in English ===
- Russel King,The Troubled Passage: Migration and New Cultural Encounters in Southern Europe in The Mediterranean Passage: Migration and New Cultural Encounters in Southern Europe, ed. Russell King, 1-21, Liverpool: Liverpool University Press (2001)
- Nicola Mai, Myths and moral panics: Italian identity and the media representation of Albanian immigration, in: Grillo, R. D and Pratt, Jeff. C, (eds.) The Politics of Recognising Difference: Multiculturalism Italian Style. Research in migration and ethnic relations series, Ashgate, Aldershot, pp. 77–94 (2002) ISBN 9780754618911
- Michela Ardizzoni, Redrawing the Boundaries of Italianness: Televised Identities in the Age of Globalisation, “Social Identities”, 11.5: 509-29 (2005)
- Derek Duncan, The Sight and Sound of Albanian Migration in Contemporary Italian Cinema, New Readings 8:1-15 (2007)
- Derek Duncan, Italy’s Postcolonial Cinema and its Histories of Representation, “Italian Studies”, 63.2: 195-211 (2008)
- Áine O'Healy, Mediterranean Passages: Abjection and Belonging in Contemporary Italian Cinema, “California Italian Studies”, 1:1 (2010)
- Grace Russo Bullaro, From Terrone to Extracomunitario: New Manifestations of Racism in Contemporary Italian Cinema, Troubador Publishing, Leicester (2010) ISBN 9781848761766
- Sabine Schrader/Daniel Winkler Ed., The Cinema of Italian Migration. European and Transatlantic Narratives, Cambridge Scholars Publishing, Newcastle-upon-Tyne, 2013 (con una filmografia tematica dal film muto ad oggi)
- Áine O'Healy, Postcolonial Theory and Italy’s ‘Multicultural’ Cinema, "The Italian Cinema Book", ed. Peter Bondanella, Basingstoke: Palgrave, (2014) 295-302.

=== in Italian ===
- Ada Lonni, Immigrati, Bruno Mondadori, Turin, 2003
- Luisa Cicognetti and Lorenza Servetti, Migranti in celluloide: storici, cinema ed emigrazione, Editoriale umbra, Foligno, 2003
- Sonia Cincinelli, I migranti nel cinema italiano, Kappa Edizioni, Rome, 2009
- Ernesto Calvanese, Media e immigrazione tra stereotipi e pregiudizi. La rappresentazione dello straniero nel racconto giornalistico, FrancoAngeli, Milan, 2011
- Sonia Cincinelli, Senza frontiere. L’immigrazione nel cinema italiano, Kappa edizioni, Rome, 2012
- Claudia Svampa, Cinquanta sfumature di mare (per gli immigrati al largo del cinema italiano), “Liberta Civili”, May-June 2012, 29
- Enrico Cammarata, Cinema e diritti umani. Una breve storia, Ti Pubblica, 2013
- Andrea Corrado, Igor Mariottini, preface by Gianni Canova, Cinema e autori sulle tracce delle migrazioni, Ediesse, Rome, 2013 ISBN 978-88-230-1625-5
- Vincenzo Valentino, Racconti di immigrazione nel cinema del reale, on "Officina della Storia", June 10, 2014

=== in French ===
- Romain Blandeau, Un nouveau cinéma italien en prise avec l’immigration, www.lesinrocks.com, 30 settembre 2011
