= Zabat =

Zabat may refer to:

- Zabat Peak, a mountain in Bulgaria
- Olivier Zabat, a French artist and director
- "Zabat", a series of photographs by Maud Sulter
