= Massimo Vigliar =

Italian producer

- Born: February 9, 1949 (age 77); Rome

Massimo Vigliar (born February 9, 1949, in Rome, Italy) is an Italian film producer.

== Career ==
In 1982 he founded Surf Film, which operates in the sector of worldwide productions and distributions with a which now counts approximately 600 films. Many of them represent part of the greatest productions of Post-war Italian Cinema, such as "Two Women”, "Marriage Italian Style”, "Yesterday, Today and Tomorrow” by Vittorio De Sica; "A Special Day” by Ettore Scola, "Django" by Sergio Corbucci amongst many others. The list also contains unforgettable pieces of European Cinema such as ‘Contempt’ by Jean Luc Godard, and ‘Quiet Days in Clichy’ by C. Chabrol. He produced "Gorbaciof" with Toni Servillo, directed by Stefano Incerti, which was shown at the 67th Venice International Film Festival, receiving widespread critical acclaim and competing at the 35th Festival of Toronto.

Recently, Vigliar has devoted himself to the production of numerous documentaries remembering some of the fundamental contributors to the greatness of Italian cinema Italian Cinema such as Vittorio De Sica and Sophia Loren. He also operates in cinema productions in the United Kingdom and Spain.

== Personal life ==
Vigliar has been philanthropically involved in Africa. In 2009 he funded the construction of a health centre in Thyolo, Malawi.
