= Volker Eckert =

German serial killer (1959-2007)

- Born: 1 July 1959; Oelsnitz, Bezirk Karl-Marx-Stadt (now Saxony), East Germany
- Died: 2 July 2007 (aged 48); Bayreuth, Bavaria, Germany
- Cause of death: Suicide by hanging
- Conviction: Attempted murder
- Penalty: None (Killed himself before sentencing)

Details
- Victims: 6–19+
- Span of crimes: 7 May 1974 – 2 November 2006
- Country: Czech Republic, France, Germany, Italy, Spain
- Date apprehended: 17 November 2006

Volker Eckert (1 July 1959 – 2 July 2007) was a German serial killer, who killed at least six women in East Germany, France and Spain, between 1974 and 2006. Eckert confessed to only six murders, five of whom were sex workers, but is believed to have killed at least nine women, and is also accused of committing additional murders of women in several European countries including Italy and the Czech Republic, but investigations were closed after Eckert committed suicide during his criminal proceedings on 2 July 2007.

== Early life ==
Volker Eckert was born on 1 July 1959 in Oelsnitz, East Germany and grew up in nearby Plauen. He was the eldest of a family of three children.

Beginning between the ages of six and nine, Eckert experienced sexual arousal from stroking the hair of one of his sister's dolls. He continued to explore his sexual interest in hair with his sister's dolls and some of his mother's wigs stored in their attic. Eventually, he would target women with the long, luxuriant hair he began to fetishize with dolls and wigs in childhood.

In 1968 and 1969, having precocious puberty, Eckert dared not tell his classmates about his premature puberty, for fear of being laughed at and misunderstood. He then imagined that all the people who came before him would react like him.

At the beginning of the 1970s, Eckert's "scenario" took on enormous proportions, even going as far as his own dolls. He amplified his "scenario" because he believed that no woman would let him touch her hair.

When Eckert was 14, his parents had a bitter divorce, with his mother expelling his father from their apartment.

During the 1973–1974 school year, Volker Eckert stalked several of his long-haired classmates, in order to strangle them and stroke their hair afterwards.

== Crimes ==
=== First murder ===
On 7 May 1974, Volker Eckert (then 14 years old) lured his classmate Silvia Unterdörfel into her attic and strangled her with a curtain cord. But when his victim resisted, Eckert strangled her harder, and Silvia died from her injuries. Once his victim was dead, Eckert stroked her hair and disguised her murder as suicide by hanging a cord around her neck and on the doorknob. The case would be classified as suicide and Eckert was not perturbed by the killing. Barely 15 years old, Eckert would live with the secret of the murder for more than 32 years.

=== Plauen attacks ===
In 1975, Eckert worked with his father as a painter. He nevertheless wandered the streets of Plauen during the night, looking for "suitable women", according to his words.

In 1977, aged 18, Eckert was arrested again after being caught one night strangling a woman in the street. He was jailed for this sexual assault but for only eight months. He also confessed to Dr Norbert Nedopil that, knowing that the police had his DNA, Eckert said he was relieved to be arrested in the event of a repeat offence. He was released from prison in 1978. He was 19 at the time.

Between 1979 and 1987, Volker Eckert began attacking around thirty different women in the dark streets of Plauen. During his acting out, Eckert throttled his victims but did not kill any of them. It worked by leaving them unconscious. When his parents died, Eckert tried to distract himself by taking care of his younger sister and his brother. He confessed to the psychiatrist that this was "the only valid thing" in which he succeeded. Soon after, Eckert's siblings were taken to live with their aunt, her detention having started to crumble and to the best of her memory, over the next eight years.

In April 1987, a murder was committed in Plauen: the lifeless body of Heike Wunderlich, 18, was found in the woods of Plauen. The young girl was strangled and stripped naked. The murder of Wunderlich was presumed unrelated to the assaults of Eckert, as the victim was murdered. The affair was closed without continuation and Eckert would never be worried about the murder.

At the end of 1987, Eckert committed another violent assault on a teenage girl. That evening, 16-year-old Claudia was walking through the streets of Plauen. Eckert spotted her and decided to follow her discreetly. Eckert approached Claudia and then threw himself on her. A fight took place and Eckert strangled her, then stroked her hair. Following his new incident, Eckert left, leaving Claudia unconscious. When she woke up, Claudia complained and sketched a portrait. When the composite portrait was distributed, Dr Nedopil formally recognized the face of a man he has examined in the past: Volker Eckert, aged 28. Knowing that Eckert was known to the police for acts of sexual assault, Dr Nedopil warned the Plauen police station. Eckert was arrested for the attempted murder committed on Claudia and then remanded in custody.

In 1988, Eckert was tried for the murder attempt on Claudia. He was then 29 years old. At the end of his judgment, Eckert was found guilty of attempted murder and sentenced to 12 years in prison. While in detention, Eckert received only a few hours of therapy from a psychologist who had heard of his sexual fantasies. But it was concluded that Volker Eckert could be released without problem.

=== Serial killings ===
In July 1994, Eckert was released from prison, after 6 1/2 years of detention. Eckert moved to Hof in Bavaria, and became a truck driver in 1999. He used his truck to attract prostitutes and thus rediscover his "childish fantasy" His victims worked as sex workers in these countries between 2001 and 2006:

- 25 June 2001, Sandra Osifo, a 21-year-old Nigerian sex worker near Chermignac, near the city of Bordeaux in western France
- 9 October 2001, Beatriz Diaz, a 24-year-old sex worker in Maçanet de la Selva, Catalonia, Spain
- 5 September 2004, Ahhiobe Gali, a 25-year-old Ghanaian sex worker in Rezzato, Italy
- 1 March 2005, Mariy Veselova, a 27-year-old Russian sex worker in Figueres, Catalonia, Spain
- 2 October 2006, Agneska Bos, a 28-year-old Polish sex worker at Reims, France
- 2 November 2006, Miglena Petrova, a 20-year-old Bulgarian sex worker in Hostalric, Catalonia, Spain

In most cases, Eckert strangled and photographed them. He kept a journal with the details of the murders. In addition, he cut off the hair.

==== Unconfirmed murders ====
Eckert is believed to have committed at least seven additional murders across Europe, including:

- April 1987, Heike Wunderlich, an 18-year-old student in Plauen, East Germany
- August 2002, Benedicta Edwards, a 23-year-old sex worker from Sierra Leone in Troyes, France
- Four other women, three of them in the Czech Republic and one in France, according to the police in those countries

=== Arrest ===
Following the murder on 2 November 2006, footage caught by a surveillance camera showing Eckert's truck next to the naked corpse of his victim, which was located beside the parking lot, was reported to the Catalan police (Mossos d'Esquadra). Eckert could be identified via the truck, and a few weeks later German police detained him in Wesseling, near Cologne, on 17 November 2006. The police found tufts of hair and pictures of his victims subjected to various tortures in Eckert's truck and in his house. During the interrogations, Eckert acknowledged committing six murders, the five sex workers in France and Spain, and that of his classmate in Germany.

== Death ==
In July 2007, while awaiting trial, Eckert committed suicide on 2 July 2007, in the middle of criminal proceedings against him. He was found dead in his cell in Bayreuth, Bavaria, having hanged himself using a drape as a makeshift noose and tying it around a TV mounting bracket. Eckert had reportedly been distressed because his sister did not visit him for his birthday the day before.

== Media ==
Eckert's case was covered in the 3rd episode of World's Most Evil Killers.

His crimes were also theme of the German podcast Verbrechen von Nebenan in episode 98 "Der LKW Killer."

In much more recent years, an image of Eckert was used in various memes, claiming his real name was “Amon Gus”, joking about the video game Among Us.

== See also ==
- List of German serial killers
