= Abdissa Aga =

Ethiopian military personnel

Colonel Abdissa Aga (አብዲሳ አጋ), often translated to Addis Agà) was an Ethiopian soldier who fought against Italian occupation following the establishment of Italian East Africa in 1936. After escaping imprisonment in Italy, he led a multi-national resistance force operating in Italy before and throughout World War II. They would later join regular allied forces, taking part in the liberation of Rome and fighting in Germany. Abdissa Aga is remembered as having entered both Rome and Berlin in a jeep waving an Ethiopian flag.

== Biography ==
Abdissa Aga was born in 1918 in Näggo, Welega, Oromia in the Ethiopian Empire. After his family moved to Nekemptie, his father was arrested and sentenced to death for the murder of his own brother. At the age of 12, Abdissa Aga travelled with his mother to Addis Ababa and unsuccessfully sought to appeal for his release. After training at an Army Academy in Harrar as a scout, he would join the Ethiopian army at the age of 14 in 1935 and fought against Fascist Italy from 1936 onwards amid the Second Italo-Ethiopian War. Following the fall of Addis Ababa in May 1936, Abdissa Aga continued fighting and was supposedly injured and arrested during Imru Haile Selassie's capture. In February 1937, he was arrested as part of mass arrests in reprisal for the attempted murder of Fascist Viceroy Rodolfo Graziani.

Accounts of Abdissa Aga's imprisonment, later deportation to Italy, and his subsequent escape differ depending on sources. Certain versions recount that Abdissa Aga was transported through Mogadishu and Asmara to Sicily where he was imprisoned in a camp. Other sources, such as Ethiopian Filmmaker Dagmawi Yimer's research, have instead claimed that Abdissa Aga was first deported to Danane concentration camp in Somalia. According to this account, he was then transported to Naples from Danane Concentration Camp among sixty other Somali, Eritrean, and Ethiopian men, women, and children to be exposed as part of the "indigenous village" of the 1940 Triennial Exhibition of Overseas Territories at the Mostra d'Oltremare. Still according to Dagmawi Yimer, the war started shortly after his arrival and, while Abdissa Aga was temporarily imprisoned for assaulting a prison guard, he eventually rejoined the group from Mostra d'Oltremare who was then moved to the Marche Region.

In captivity he met Captain Julio (Yugoslav lieutenant Jule Kačić). The two became friends and led the escape of 12 prisoners, into the Sanbicini Mountains, near Naples. They would later return to the camp, kill a few guards, and helped organise the escape of all prisoners taking the camp's weapons and supplies.

He operated with the nom-de-guerre "Antonio" or "Major Abdissa" as part of the "Mario Band" ("banda Mario") named after its leader Mario Depangher, which supposedly operated near Monte San Vicino.

Abdissa Aga was eventually appointed leader of a unit of 380 partisan fighters.

== Legacy ==
Abdissa Aga has been remembered as a hero in Ethiopian and Oromo national and common memories:

In a chapter titled "Abdissa Aga: Il partigiano nero in Italia (Abdissa Aga: The Black Partisan in Italy)" Ethiopian filmmaker Dagmawi Yimer recounts reading about Abdissa Aga under the Derg in class: "For us children, the story of Abdissa Aga served as a substitute for the tales of American superheroes, which were prohibited and nowhere to be found. From a young age, we grew up with stories about real, heroic people, without any need to resort to fantasy".

Ethiopian playwright Tesfaye Abebe wrote a play on Abdissa Aga.

A graphic novel written by Minas Halefom, published in December 2019 with the support of the Serbian Embassy in Addis Ababa depicted Abdissa marching alongside Jule Kačić with an Ethiopian Flag in Rome.

Abdissa Aga was mentioned in a heroic poem written and performed at the Lammiin Lammiif concert by Hachalu Hundessa on Oromo people's suffering and struggles.
