= Lost Kisses =

Lost Kisses may refer to:

- Lost Kisses (2010 film), an Italian comedy-drama film
- Lost Kisses (1945 film), an Argentine film
