= Ghanaians in Italy =

Total population
- Various estimates: 50,414

Regions with significant populations
- Lombardy, Emilia-Romagna, Veneto, Sicily

Languages
- Italian, English, French, other languages of Ghana

Religion
- Mainly Roman Catholicism, Protestantism

Related ethnic groups
- Ghanaians, Ivorians in Italy, Burkinabe in Italy, Togolese in Italy

The presence of Ghanaians in Italy dates back to the 1980s.

== Numbers ==
In 2010 in Italy there were 46,890 regular immigrants from Ghana. In 2006 there were 36,540. The three cities with most number of Ghanaians are: Palermo, Modena and Reggio Emilia.

== History ==
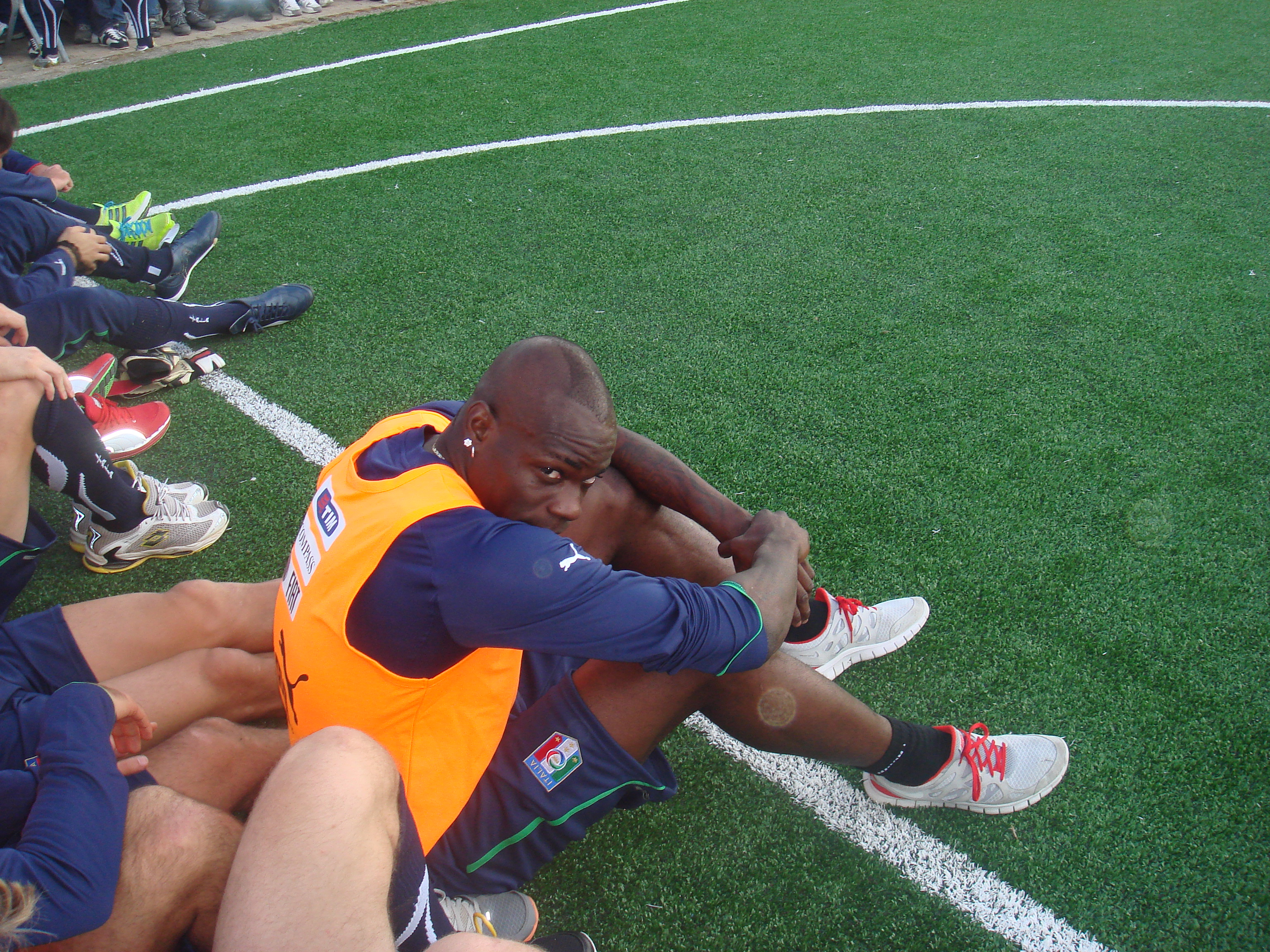
The footballer Mario Balotelli an Italian of Ghanaian descent

In Italy the migration from Ghana began in the mid-1980s, when people came over as students driven by economic motives.

The choice of Italy as a place of destination, it is often due to the ease of obtaining an entry visa, and the difficulty of obtaining an entry permit for other European countries. In fact initially the preferred destinations were Britain, then Netherlands and the United States, but for many of them, the first available option was Italy. Towards the year 1988 also it was easier to get a visa for Italy because there were few immigrants, but Britain was more rigid because many Ghanaians actually entered as tourists and stayed permanently. The guys of the second generation who were born in Italy, studying, trying to carve out a space, and trying to achieve a respectable economic independence and their parents work very hard to guarantee them a relative stability.

== Entrepreneurship ==
Ghanacoop was founded in Modena in 2005 within the National Association of Ghana and it is one of the first non-profit social enterprises run by immigrants on the Italian territory. It's a concrete example of community enterprise, involving an entire community in the whole of its economic, social or cultural activities. The farm, which involves 135 workers cultivating an area of 400 hectares, exports its products to the British market and, through Ghanacoop, on the Italian market. On the local market the product is sold to both distributors of fresh produce, and for firms engaged in processing for the production of juices, fruit concentrates and fruit cut, or, in the Italian business vocabulary, fourth range products.

== Notable Ghanaians in Italy ==
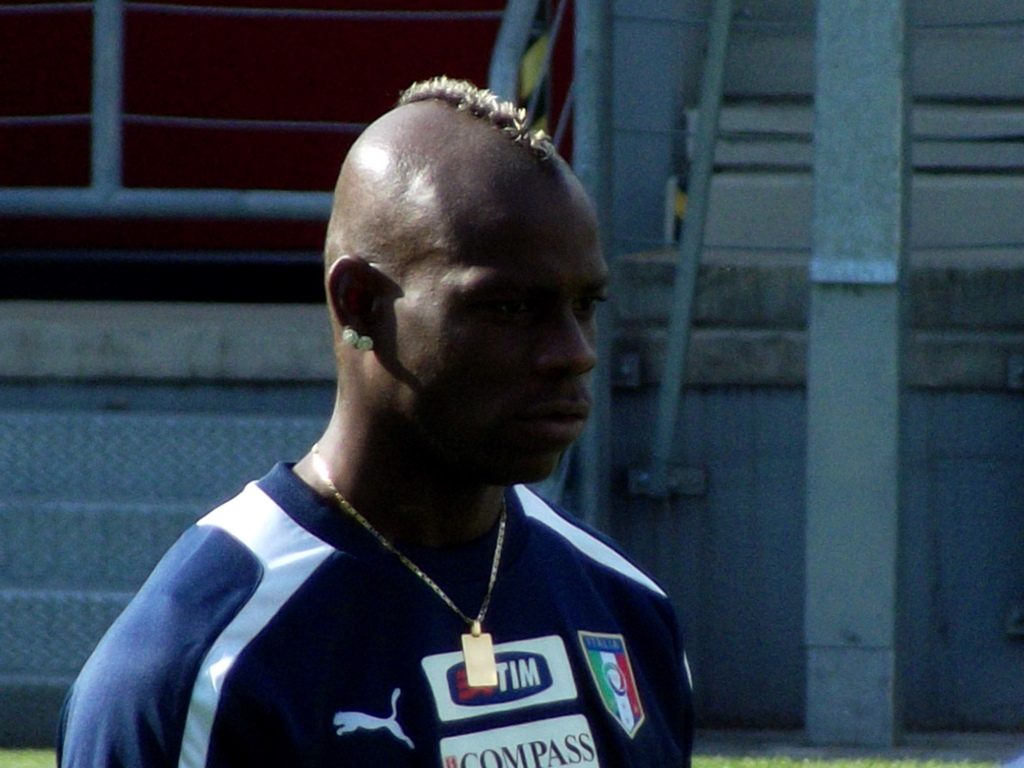
Mario Balotelli

- Gloria Hooper, (1992) athlete
- Fred Kudjo Kuwornu (1971) Filmmaker, Producer
- Bello FiGo, (1992) YouTuber, singer
- Mario Balotelli, (1990) footballer
- Giovanni Kyeremateng, (1991) footballer
- Desmond N'Ze, (1989) footballer
- Kelvin Yeboah, Footballer
- Kingsley Boateng, (1994) footballer
- Jasmine Paolini, tennis player
