= Kuklite =

Bulgarian mountain

Kuklite (Куклите)
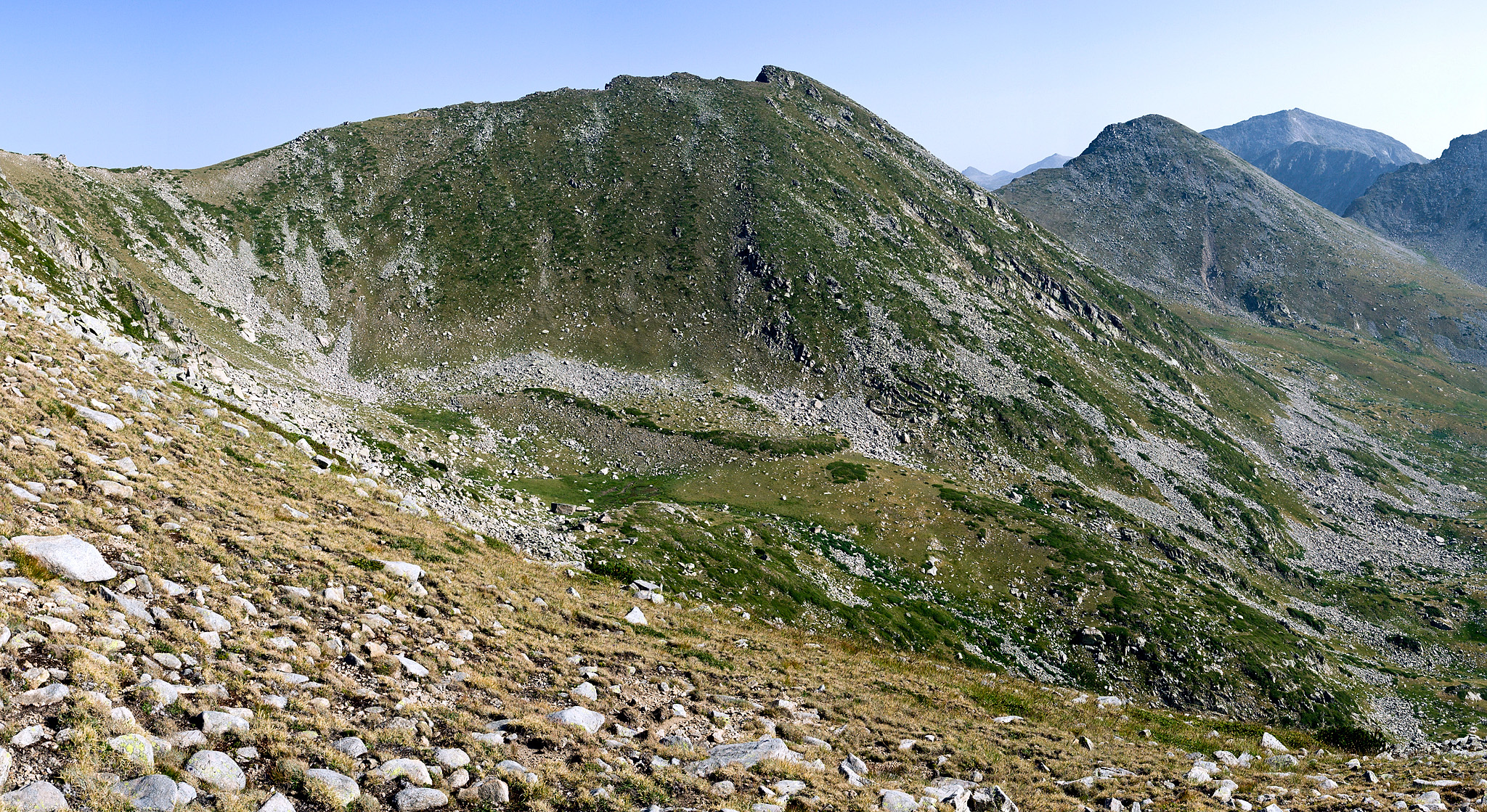

Highest point
- Elevation: 2,686 m (8,812 ft)
- Coordinates: 41°39′54.55″N 23°28′15.68″E

Geography
- Location: Blagoevgrad Province, Bulgaria
- Parent range: Pirin Mountains

Kuklite (Bulgarian: Куклите [ˈkuklitɛ]) is a 2,686 m-high peak in the Pirin mountain range, south-western Bulgaria. It is located in the northern part of Pirin on the Kamenitsa secondary ridge between the summits of Yalovarnika (2,763 m), Zabat (2,688 m) to the north-east and Golena (2,633 m) to the south. It is built up of granite. The western and north-western slopes of Kuklite are very steep and are open to the pebbly Begovitsa cirque; the foothills contain accumulations of moraines, densely covered in mountain pine (Pinus mugo) at places. The eastern and south-eastern slopes facing the Bashmandra cirque are grassy and oblique. The Begovishko glacial lake is situated at the northern foothills of the summit.

The most convenient starting point for ascending Kulklite is Begovitsa refuge via trails passing through Begovishko lake and the saddle between Kuklite and Zabat. Another trail starts from Pirin refuge and goes through Bashmandra cirque.
