= Kent Jones (critic) =

American programmer, film critic and filmmaker

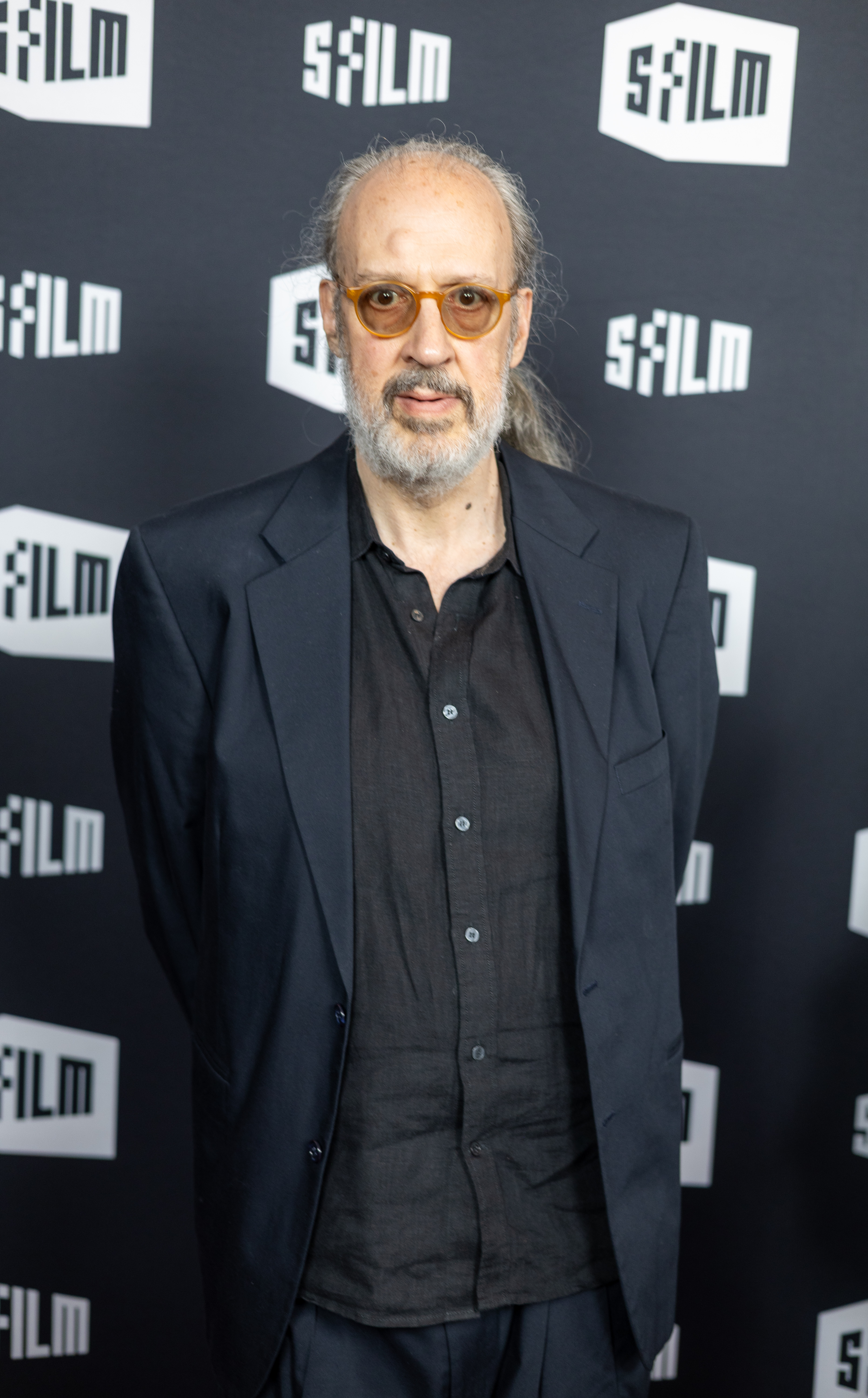
- Jones in 2026
- Education: McGill University, New York University
- Occupations: Programmer, film critic, filmmaker

Kent Jones (born 1960) is an American programmer, film critic and filmmaker. He is most known for his work as Artistic director of the New York Film Festival (NYFF) between 2013-2019.

His documentary Hitchcock/Truffaut (2015) premiered at the 68th Cannes Film Festival.

== Biography ==
Kent Jones grew up in Berkshire County, Massachusetts, before attending McGill University in the late 1970s. He then transferred to New York University where he studied filmmaking. Jones later recalled, "I had a very romantic notion of studying film with Nick Ray, who was a teacher at NYU, but Nick died before I had the chance to take his class and I eventually dropped out of school."

He worked at New Video, the first video store in Manhattan, before writing professionally as a film critic. He would later become a correspondent for Cahiers du Cinéma and his criticism would later be published in Bookforum, Artforum, and Cinema Scope. His writing would also appear in Film Comment beginning in 1996, and he later became the publication's editor-at-large. A collection of his work was later published as Physical Evidence: Selected Film Criticism in 2007.

In the early 1990s, Jones worked as a video archivist for Martin Scorsese at his offices in the Brill Building. He eventually worked on many of Scorsese's documentaries on film history, and he later co-directed several including A Letter to Elia (2010), and directed his own such as Val Lewton: The Man in the Shadows (2007). He also programmed with Bruce Goldstein a repertory series at Film Forum on 1970s American films before joining the Film Society of Lincoln Center as an associate director programming in 1998. He then joined the selection committee for the New York Film Festival in 2002, and he later succeeded Richard Peña as the director of the New York Film Festival and as the chairman of the festival's selection committee, overseeing his first programming slate in 2013. Jones would also be awarded a Guggenheim Fellowship for his scholarly work in 2012.

Jones co-wrote Arnaud Desplechin's film Jimmy P: Psychotherapy of a Plains Indian, and though it did screen at the New York Film Festival, Jones recused himself from the selection process to avoid a conflict of interest. He directed Hitchcock/Truffaut (2015) about François Truffaut's celebrated book on Alfred Hitchcock before making his narrative feature debut with Diane (2018). The following year, the Film Society announced that Jones had decided to step down as the director of the New York Film Festival and as the chairman of the festival's selection committee. Jones would later cite his own ambitions to make more films as the basis for his decision.

== Filmography ==
Documentary film

Year	Title	Director	Writer
1999	My Voyage to Italy	No	Yes
2010	A Letter to Elia	Yes	Yes
2015	Hitchcock/Truffaut	Yes	Yes

Feature film

Year	Title	Director	Writer
2013	Jimmy P: Psychotherapy of a Plains Indian	No	Yes
2018	Diane	Yes	Yes
2025	Late Fame	Yes	No

Television

Year	Title	Director	Writer	Notes
2004	Lady by the Sea: The Statue of Liberty	Yes	Yes	
2007	Val Lewton: The Man in the Shadows	Yes	Yes	
2024	Martin Scorsese Presents: The Saints	No	Yes	8 episodes
