= Yalovarnika =

Peak in Bulgaria

Yalovarnika (Яловарника)
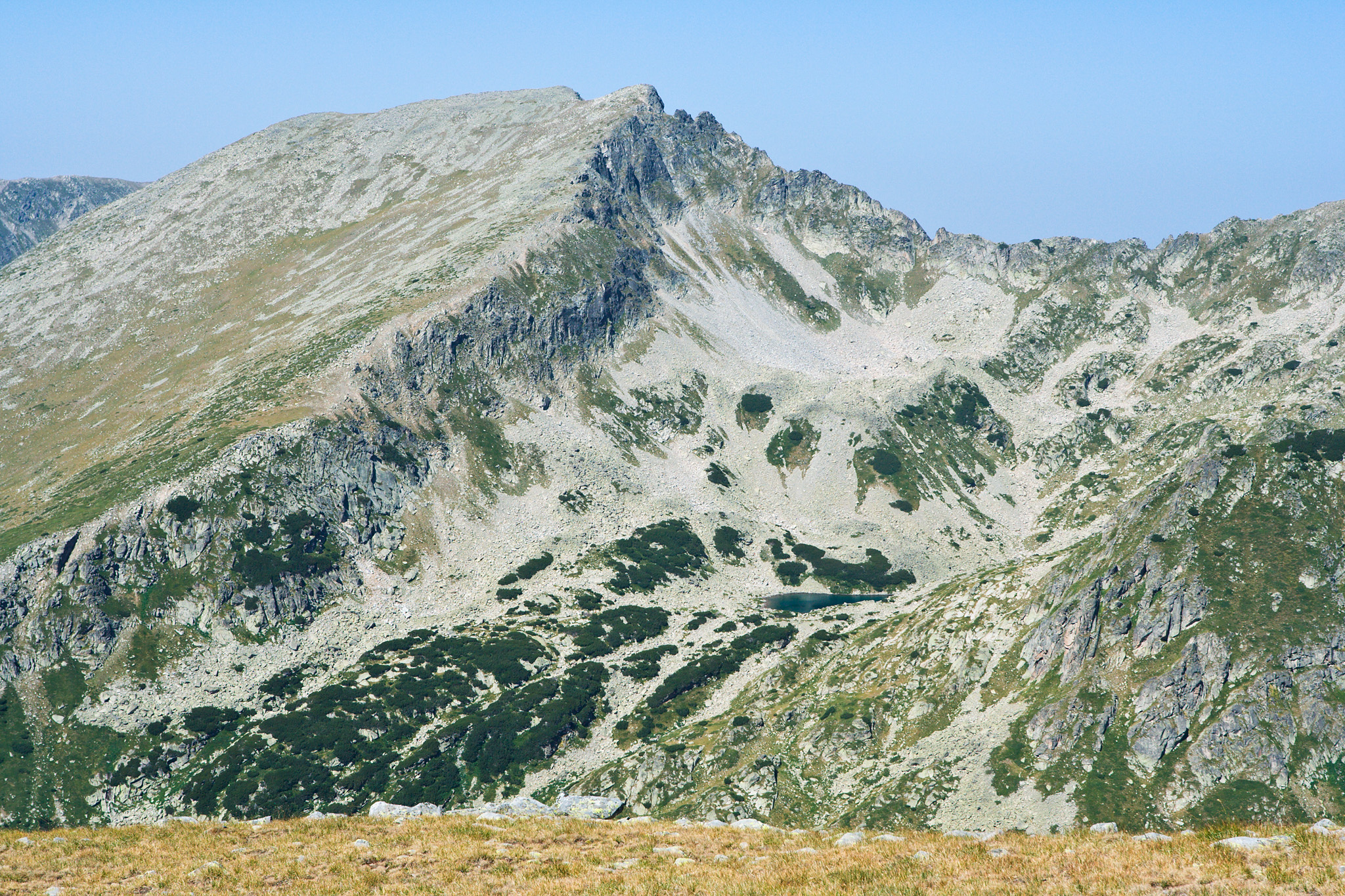
- The south-eastern slopes of Yalovarnika

Highest point
- Elevation: 2,763 m (9,065 ft)
- Coordinates: 41°40′19.56″N 23°29′16.44″E

Geography
- Location: Blagoevgrad Province, Bulgaria
- Parent range: Pirin Mountains

Yalovarnika (Bulgarian: Яловарника [jaɫoˈvarnikɐ]) is a 2,763 m-high peak in the Pirin mountain range, south-western Bulgaria. It is located in the northern part of Pirin on the 22 km-long Kamenitsa secondary ridge between the summits of Kamenitsa (2,822 m) to the north and Zabat (2,688 m), Kuklite (2,686 m) and Golena (2,633 m) to the south.

Yalovarnika is a massive granite peak. Seen from the Mozgovishka Gate, its distinctive double-peak profile stands out between the summits of Kamenitsa and Kuklite. The former is connected to Yalovarnika through a series of steep rock gendarmes. A deeply cut saddle divides it from Zabat to the south-west.

The north-western slopes of Yalovarnika are open to the pebbly Begovitsa cirque and have a typical alpine look. They are almost vertical, severely smoothed and eroded, with extensive anhydrous stone-piles at the base of the summit. To the north-east, the slopes are also rocky and harbour the Manenko Lake at their base.

The southern and south-eastern slopes are oblique, grassy and covered with juniper. They are a massive denudation, descending to the valley of the Pirinska Bistritsa river at an altitude of 1900-2000 m and forming the northern parts of the Bashmandra cirque. From these slopes there are numerous streams that flow into the Bashmandra river.
