= Jang Liu =

South Korean actress (born 1978)

- Born: October 6, 1978 (age 48); South Korea
- Occupation: Actress

- Jang Liu
- Hangul: 장리우
- RR: Jang Riu
- MR: Chang Riu

Jang Liu (Korean: 장리우; born October 6, 1978) is a South Korean actress. In 2009 she began to establish herself in independent films, quickly earning accolades for her performance as a troubled prostitute in Kim Gok's Exhausted, which she starred in with Park Ji-hwan; the two also appeared together in Anti Gas Skin, with Jang playing a lead role of "wolf girl" Mi-joo. Jang has continued to perform in film and television productions, more recently appearing in the horror thriller The Mimic and starring as family matriarch Hye-young in the multi-award-winning film Move the Grave.

== Filmography ==
=== Film ===
Year	Title	Role	Notes	Ref.
2009	Yoga	help desk receptionist		
2009	Exhausted	mute woman	starring role	
2009	A Blind River	nurse		
2010	One Night Stand	"sunglasses woman"	episode 1	
2011	Re-encounter	nurse		
2012	As One	Wang Ming		
2013	10 Minutes	Young-mi		
2013	Anti Gas Skin	Mi-joo	starring role	
2013	A Mere Life	Han Yoo-rim		
2013	The Fake	Madame Cafe / Youngseon friend / villager	animated	
2013	Marriage Blue		cameo	
2013	The Attorney	student		
2014	Master and Man		animated	
2014	Cart	cashier		
2015	Shoot Me in the Heart	ECT nurse		
2016	Birds Fly Back to the Nest	Hye-young		
2016	The Man of Merit	Park Ji-yeong		
2017	The Mimic	Ji-hye		
2018	A Blue Mouthed Face	Seo-young		
2018	Late Afternoon	Seung-yeon	short film/starring role	
2019	Move the Grave	Baek Hye-young	starring role	

=== Television series ===
Year	Title	Role	Network	Ref.
2016	Listen to Love	Wetoli (username)	JTBC	
2017	Duel	Yang Man Choon's subordinate	OCN	
2022	My Liberation Notes	H Card employee (ep. 15)	JTBC	
