= The Cardboard Village =

2011 film

- Film poster
- Directed by: Ermanno Olmi
- Written by: Ermanno Olmi
- Produced by: Luigi Musini
- Starring: Michael Lonsdale
- Cinematography: Fabio Olmi
- Music by: Sofia Gubaidulina
- Release date: 6 September 2011 (Venice)
- Running time: 87 minutes
- Country: Italy
- Language: Italian

The Cardboard Village (Italian: Il villaggio di cartone) is a 2011 Italian drama film directed by Ermanno Olmi.

== Plot ==
A now uninhabitable church is decommissioned in the presence of the old pastor. The environment is stripped of all sacred furnishings, and not even the large crucifix will be saved. From this situation begins a new life for the building, which, now stripped of all liturgical and "institutional" aspects, is transformed into the place of the living concretization of the old priest's faith. A place of desolation is thus transformed into a space of brotherhood and welcome for a group of non-EU Africans without residence permits, the embodiment of the excluded and marginalized in our society.

== Cast ==
- Michael Lonsdale as Il Vecchio Prete
- Rutger Hauer as Il Sacrestano
- Massimo De Francovich as Il Medico
- Alessandro Haber as Il Graduato
- Ibrahima Faye El Hadji as Il Soccorritore
- Irma Pino Viney as Magdha
- Fatima Alì as Fatima
- Samuels Leon Delroy as Il Bardo
- Fernando Chronda as Il Cherubino
- Souleymane Sow as L'Avverso
- Linda Keny as Madre

== See also ==
- Films about immigration to Italy
