= A Letter to Elia =

2010 US documentary film by Martin Scorsese

- Film poster
- Directed by: Kent Jones; Martin Scorsese
- Written by: Kent Jones; Martin Scorsese
- Produced by: Emma Tillinger Koskoff; Martin Scorsese
- Starring: Elia Kazan; Martin Scorsese
- Cinematography: Mark Raker
- Edited by: Rachel Reichman
- Production companies: Sikelia Productions; Far Hills Pictures
- Release date: September 4, 2010 (Venice)
- Running time: 60 minutes
- Country: United States
- Language: English

A Letter to Elia is a 2010 documentary film directed by Kent Jones and Martin Scorsese that follows the life and career of film director Elia Kazan and how he influenced Scorsese. Made from clips from films, stills, readings from Kazan's autobiography, a speech he wrote on directing read by Elias Koteas, a videotaped interview done late in Kazan's life, and Scorsese's commentary on and off screen.

== Accolades ==
- 2010 Peabody Awards - Winner
- 63rd Primetime Emmy Awards - Outstanding Directing For Nonfiction Programming - Nominee
