= Hitchcock/Truffaut (film) =

2015 film

- Theatrical release poster
- Directed by: Kent Jones
- Written by: Kent Jones; Serge Toubiana
- Based on: Hitchcock/Truffaut by François Truffaut
- Produced by: Charles S. Cohen; Olivier Mille
- Starring: Martin Scorsese; Wes Anderson; David Fincher; Olivier Assayas; Peter Bogdanovich; Arnaud Desplechin; James Gray; Kiyoshi Kurosawa; Richard Linklater; Paul Schrader
- Narrated by: Bob Balaban
- Cinematography: Nick Bentgen; Daniel Cowen; Eric Gautier; Mihai Mălaimare Jr.; Lisa Rinzler; Genta Tamaki
- Edited by: Rachel Reichman
- Music by: Jeremiah Bornfield
- Distributed by: Cohen Media Group
- Release dates: 19 May 2015 (Cannes); 2 December 2015 (USA)
- Running time: 80 minutes
- Countries: France; United States
- Languages: English; French; Japanese
- Box office: $302,459

Hitchcock/Truffaut is a 2015 documentary film directed by Kent Jones.

== Summary ==
It is about François Truffaut's 1966 book on Alfred Hitchcock, Hitchcock/Truffaut, and its impact on cinema. Truffaut had interviewed his fellow film director Hitchcock and recorded said interview over the course of eight days in 1962 at the latter's offices at Universal Studios, Hollywood, to write his book. The documentary features reflections from directors including James Gray, Martin Scorsese, Paul Schrader, Wes Anderson, David Fincher, Arnaud Desplechin, and Olivier Assayas, and is narrated by Bob Balaban, who co-starred with Truffaut in Close Encounters of the Third Kind (1977).

== Cast ==
- Alfred Hitchcock
- François Truffaut
- Wes Anderson
- Olivier Assayas
- Peter Bogdanovich
- Arnaud Desplechin
- David Fincher
- James Gray
- Kiyoshi Kurosawa
- Richard Linklater
- Paul Schrader
- Martin Scorsese

== Release ==
Hitchcock/Truffaut premiered at the 2015 Cannes Film Festival and was shown in the TIFF Docs section of the 2015 Toronto International Film Festival. The film grossed $300,000 at the box office.

== Reception ==
Hitchcock/Truffaut received critical acclaim. On Rotten Tomatoes, the film has a 95% score based on 110 reviews, with an average rating of 7.7/10. The site's consensus states: "Essential viewing for cineastes while still offering rich rewards for neophytes, Hitchcock/Truffaut offers an affectionate -- and well-crafted -- tribute to a legend". Metacritic reports a 79 out of 100 rating based on 25 critics.

Chris Nashawaty of Entertainment Weekly gave the film a grade of "A−", commenting that "the best part is getting to hear both men talk about their art in exhaustive, almost fetishistic detail". Peter Travers of Rolling Stone gave the film 3.5 out of 4, saying, "My only problem with Hitchcock/Truffaut is that it's too short at 80 minutes." Peter Debruge of Variety called it "Accessible yet intelligent". Todd McCarthy of The Hollywood Reporter stated that "this documentary will be a top draw wherever films about filmmakers are welcome".

At the 38th Denver Film Festival, it won the Maysles Brothers Award for Best Documentary Film.
