= First Snowfall =

2013 Italian film

- Directed by: Andrea Segre
- Cinematography: Luca Bigazzi
- Music by: Piccola Bottega Baltazar
- Release date: 2013
- Running time: 104 minutes
- Country: Italy

First Snowfall (Italian: La prima neve) is a 2013 Italian drama film directed by Andrea Segre. The film premiered in competition at the 70th Venice International Film Festival.

== Cast ==
- Matteo Marchel: Michele Fongher
- Jean-Christophe Folly: Dani
- Anita Caprioli: Elisa
- Giuseppe Battiston: Fabio
- Peter Mitterrutzner: Pietro Fongher

== See also ==
- Movies about immigration to Italy
