= Hitchcock/Truffaut =

1966 book by François Truffaut about Alfred Hitchcock

- Author: François Truffaut
- Original title: Le Cinéma selon Alfred Hitchcock
- Language: French
- Genre: Non-fiction, film
- Published: 1966
- Publisher: Éditions Robert Laffont
- Publication place: France

Hitchcock/Truffaut is a 1966 book by François Truffaut about Alfred Hitchcock, originally released in French as Le Cinéma selon Alfred Hitchcock.

First published by Éditions Robert Laffont, it is based on a 1962 dialogue between Hitchcock and Truffaut, in which the two directors spent a week in a room at Universal Studios talking about movies. The book walks through all of Hitchcock's films, from his early British period to Torn Curtain. After Hitchcock's death, Truffaut updated the book with a new preface and final chapter on Hitchcock's later films Topaz, Frenzy and Family Plot, as well as his unrealized project The Short Night.

== Background ==
In the preface to the revised edition, Truffaut explains that "In 1962, while in New York to present Jules and Jim, I noticed that every journalist asked me the same question: 'Why do the critics of Cahiers du Cinéma take Hitchcock so seriously? He's rich and successful, but his movies have no substance.' In the course of an interview during which I praised Rear Window to the skies, an American critic surprised me by commenting, you love Rear Window because you know nothing about Greenwich Village. To this absurd statement, I replied, 'Rear Window is not about Greenwich Village, it is a film about cinema, and I do know cinema.'

"Upon my return to Paris, I was still disturbed by this exchange. From my past career as a critic, in common with all of the young writers from Cahiers du Cinéma, I still felt the imperative need to convince. It was obvious that Hitchcock, whose genius for publicity was equaled only by that of Salvador Dali, had in the long run been victimized in American intellectual circles because of his facetious response to interviewers and his deliberate practice of deriding their questions. In examining his films it was obvious that he had given more thought to the potential of his art form than any of his colleagues. It occurred to me that if he would, for the first time, agree to responding seriously to a systematic questionnaire, the resulting document might modify the American critics' approach to Hitchcock."

== Content ==
Truffaut and Hitchcock trace the arc of Hitchcock's career: his design of title cards for silent films; his time in Germany and the influence of Lang and Murnau; The Lodger (1927), which Hitchcock regards as his true debut; Blackmail (1929), the first talkie made in Britain; The 39 Steps (1935), which Truffaut sees as a summation of Hitchcock's British period; the move to Hollywood with Rebecca (1940); Rope (1948), made to look like it was filmed in one take; the "spectacular comeback" of Strangers on a Train (1951); North by Northwest (1959), which Truffaut sees as a summation of Hitchcock's American period, and the success of Psycho (1960).

Hitchcock explains how he approaches stories. He defines his concept of the MacGuffin: "Well, it's the device, the gimmick, if you will... The theft of secret documents was the original MacGuffin. So the 'MacGuffin' is the term we use to cover all that sort of thing: to steal plans or documents, or discover a secret, it doesn't matter what it is. And the logicians are wrong in trying to figure out the truth of a MacGuffin, since it's beside the point. The only thing that really matters is that in the picture the plans, documents, or secrets must seem to be of vital importance to the characters. To me, the narrator, they're of no importance whatever." He says that "Psycho had a very interesting construction and that game with the audience was fascinating. I was directing the viewers. You might say I was playing them, like an organ." He also explores technical aspects of his films, like the dolly zoom, where the lens zooms forward while the camera pulls away.

The revised edition includes several stills from Hitchcock's films, excerpts from his sketchbooks and a full filmography of the director. Hitchcock says Shadow of a Doubt is his favorite of his films, while Truffaut picks Rear Window, which he interprets as a film about watching film, noting that “James Stewart is exactly in the position of a spectator looking at a movie.” Hitchcock also speaks at length about Vertigo, which got mixed reviews on its release but is regarded by many as his masterpiece; in the 2012 Sight & Sound poll, it was voted the greatest film of all time.

== Reception and legacy ==
The book helped establish Hitchcock's reputation as an auteur in the United States. Reviewing the revised edition in The New York Times Book Review, Phillip Lopate wrote that "One is ravished by the density of insights into cinematic questions...Truffaut performed a tour de force of tact in getting this ordinarily guarded man to open up as he had never done before (and never would again)... If the 1967 Hitchcock/Truffaut can now be seen as something of a classic, this revised version is even better." Truffaut would pay homage to Hitchcock in his films The Bride Wore Black, Mississippi Mermaid and Confidentially Yours and would work with composer Bernard Herrmann, who scored several Hitchcock films. Truffaut tells Hitchcock "It has often occurred to me that one could make a first-rate comedy about the making of a movie"; in 1973, he directed Day For Night, a comedy about the making of a movie in which he plays the director.

In 1979, Hitchcock was honored with the Lifetime Achievement Award from the American Film Institute. Truffaut spoke at the ceremony, saying "In America, you call this man 'Hitch'. In France, we call him Monsieur Hitchcock... I asked Monsieur Hitchcock to give me an interview of fifty hours and to reveal all his secrets. The result was a book. Actually, it was like a cookbook, full of recipes for making films."

In 2010 Hitchcock/Truffaut tied for second in Sight & Sound's poll of the greatest books on film.

The book is the inspiration for the 2015 documentary Hitchcock/Truffaut by Kent Jones. In it, several prominent directors, including Wes Anderson, Peter Bogdanovich, Paul Schrader and Martin Scorsese speak of the book's influence on them. The documentary was released to critical acclaim, with Todd McCarthy describing it as "Something of a film buff's nirvana" and "a resourceful, illuminating and very welcome documentation both of filmmaking and the making of film history."

== See also ==
- Hawks on Hawks, a 1982 book of interviews between Joseph McBride and Howard Hawks
- This is Orson Welles, a 1992 book of interviews between Orson Welles and Peter Bogdanovich
