= Come un uomo sulla terra =

- Directed by: Andrea Segre, Dagmawi Yimer, Riccardo Biadene
- Screenplay by: Andrea Segre, Dagmawi Yimer, Riccardo Biadene
- Produced by: Asinitas Onlus, Zalab
- Cinematography: Andrea Segre
- Edited by: Luca Manes
- Music by: Piccola Bottega Baltazar
- Release date: 2008
- Running time: 56 minutes
- Country: Italy

Come un uomo sulla terra is an Italian 2008 documentary film. The film premiered at the 2008 Milano Film Festival and later was shown during the 2010 International Film Festival Rotterdam.

== Synopsis ==
Giving voice to the Ethiopian refugees living in Rome, the film provides us with direct insight into the brutal ways in which Libya, aided by Italian and European funding, controls the flow of African emigrants trying to reach Europe. Come un uomo sulla terra is a journey of pain and dignity voiced through the remembrances of Dagmawi Yimer as he tells of unthinkable human suffering and denounces a desperate political situation. The film was nominated for the David di Donatello Award for Best Documentary in 2009.
