= Danane concentration camp =

The Danane concentration camp was an Italian concentration camp established near Mogadishu in Italian East Africa after the Second Italo-Ethiopian War which operated from the end of 1935 until the 18th of March 1941. Some 6000-6500 people, mostly Ethiopians that were accused of resisting Italian rule in Italian East Africa, were interned at the camp throughout this period. Many accounts, including Italian records, report that half of the camp's population died from malnutrition, malaria, pneumonia, and other diseases.

Internees in Danane were often first transferred through Debre Birhan and Akaki concentration camp (Akaki Prison) before arriving at Danane.

== History ==
Danane camp was first opened towards the end of 1935, it was intended to house Amhara prisoners of war from Ras Desta Damtru and Nasibu Zeamanuel's armies but the methods used by Italians in the Second Italo-Ethiopian War (use of chemical weapons, refusal to take prisoners...) meant that it remained largely empty until the second half of 1936. For the sake of comparison, in eight months of war Italian forces barely made more prisoners of war than Ethiopian forces had done in one day at the battle of Adwa in 1896.

Following the end of the war, the camp grew quickly as fascist viceroy Rodolfo Graziani attempted to liquidate remaining Ethiopian imperial army forces and resisting Amharas and Shoans, with an estimated 1,800 Ethiopians, Eritreans, and Somalis arriving in the next year. Bekele Hapte Micael, a judge on the High Court of Ethiopia who was interned at Danane, would later give a testimony on conditions at the camp, explaining that internees were fed "broken hardtack ("galletta") infested with worms" and that food conditions would worsen the next year.

Indeed, the concentration camp grew to its important proportions amid the campaign of repression that followed the attempted murder of Rodolfo Graziani on February 19, 1937 (see Yekatit 12). Following the massacre of an estimated 449 to 1,200 monks, priests, and pilgrims in May 1937 by General Pietro Maletti at Debre Libanos, in November, 360 survivors from the massacre were deported to Danane, partly through Debre Birhan and the Nefasit prison. Among them, 30 school boys from Debre Birhan were deported in secrecy partly to cover up the dimensions of the massacre, with Graziani claiming they had instead been "sent to their native homes" in false reports to Rome. 16 of them died at Danane. In this period, Ethiopian Resistant Abdissa Aga was reportedly held there temporarily alongside other recruits from the Holeta Academy. He described that "people died everyday at Danane" and that "at its peak, as many as 30 inmates were dying every 24 hours from starvation and illness."

Imru Zelleke was also detained at Danane at the age of 12. He recounted that women and very young children were kept separately from men, with couples separated and young boys like him separated from their mothers.

Researchers have argued that the administering of the Danane camp had a clear economic function. In a 2010 interview, Ian Campbell explained that "there was a large commercial element in Danane (...). Danane became a place around which Italians who were well connected, could make money". Internees were subjected to forced labour, with men looking for wood, working in gardens/farms, in oil plants, and cement factories, and building roads, while women and children were forced to clean the camp. The Italian administration often owned and exploited sugar cane and banana concessions, and Campbell has also found that, at least in 1938, some of the internees from Danane were forced to work at a Banana Plantation in Janaale.

On August 16th 1937, Eugenio Mazzucchetti was named camp commander, taking over on the 22nd from a Lieutenant Colonel Acampora of the Carabinieri who had been in command for "over 6 months". At his arrival, he described the camp as "three camps for men and one for women", with men sleeping in "dilapidated tukuls" (tukul cadenti) and women in "torn and broken tents" (tendoni stracciate e rotte), no sanitation facilities, internees "filthy and wearing rags", corpses, and loaves of bread so rotten they were "green like Gorgonzola" (coll'interno verde come del gorgonzola). Throughout his command, Mazzucchetti documented the dire conditions imposed on those interned there in his personal diary. Internees were sometimes whipped with a "Kurbash" - including when they tried to escape. On December 9th 1937, a mixed-race woman, Uolde Gheorghis, died while giving birth - she had been deported from Addis Ababa despite being 7 month pregnant. On April 30th 1938, a 7-month old girl, the granddaughter of former minister of foreign affairs Heruy Walda Sellasie, died of deprivation in Danane.

By early December 1937, an estimated 2,500 people were crammed in the camp.

Starting in January 1938, following Graziani's replacement as viceroy by Amedeo di Savoia and the stepping down of General Santini as governor of Somaliland, conditions were slightly improved with first barracks built and some internees released (900-1000 on January 22nd and 188 more in the next year).

On March 18 1941, Danane and its estimated 900-1000 internees were 'liberated' by Kenyan Askari troops under colonial British officers' command, with Italian troops (18 Italian soldiers, less than forty "Zaptiè", and two civilians) surrendering without a fight. Mazzucchetti, the camp commander, welcomed their arrival as he was scared of the internees revolting, saying that the "Amhara were furious" and were "out for his skin" ("Ahmara sono furibondi e feroci contro di me. So che vogliono farmi la pelle!"). At their arrival, Mazzucchetti described that British soldiers were shocked by the absence of hygiene and that the Italian had buried the dead in unmarked graves.

Danane was then used as a camp for Italian prisoners of war captured during the liberation of Ethiopia and Eritrea.

== See also ==
- Italian concentration camps
- Italian East Africa
- "Directive of the government of Italian Somaliland to the commandant of Danane concentration camp" from the Wiener Holocaust Library.
- DANANE - Diario somalo, 31 Ottobre 1935 – 23 Giugno 1941 (Trascrizione del manoscritto originale). Diary of Eugenio Mazzucchetti.
