= L'ultimo gattopardo: Ritratto di Goffredo Lombardo =

- Directed by: Giuseppe Tornatore
- Written by: Giuseppe Tornatore
- Produced by: Guido Lombardo
- Cinematography: Fabio Zamarion
- Edited by: Massimo Quaglia
- Release date: September 2010 (Venice Film Festival)
- Language: Italian

L'ultimo gattopardo: Ritratto di Goffredo Lombardo (translated: "The last leopard: Portrait of Goffredo Lombardo") is a 2010 Italian documentary film directed by Giuseppe Tornatore about the producer and Titanus president Goffredo Lombardo.

It premiered out of competition at the 67th edition of the Venice Film Festival. It was awarded a special Nastro d'Argento at the 2011 Silver Ribbon Awards ceremony.
