= Il sangue verde =

- Directed by: Andrea Segre
- Produced by: ZaLab Jolefilm Æternam Films
- Cinematography: Luca Bigazzi Federico Angelucci Matteo Calore
- Edited by: Sara Zavarise
- Music by: Piccola Bottega Baltazar
- Release date: 2010
- Running time: 57 minutes
- Country: Italy

Il sangue verde ("The Green Blood") is an Italian 2010 documentary film.

== Synopsis ==
January 2010, Rosarno, Calabria. Widely publicized immigrant riots exposed the unjust and squalid conditions that thousands of African laborers, exploited by an economy controlled by the Calabrian mafia, endure on a daily basis. For a brief moment, the immigrants caught the attention of the Italian public, who responded to these protests with fear and violence. In a few hours, the immigrants in question were "evacuated" from Rosarno and the problem was "resolved." But the faces and the stories of those involved in the riots at Rosarno tell a different story.

== See also ==
- Movies about immigration to Italy
