= Anti Gas Skin =

2013 South Korean film

- Directed by: Kim Gok and Kim Seon
- Screenplay by: Kim Seon
- Produced by: Choi Doo-young
- Starring: Park Ji-hwan, Jang Liu, Cho Young-jin, Patrick Smith
- Release date: 22 August 2013
- Running time: 123 minutes
- Country: South Korea
- Language: Korean

Anti Gas Skin (Korean: 방독피; RR: Bangdokpi) is a 2013 South Korean film directed by twin brothers Kim Gok and Kim Seon. The directors described Anti Gas Skin as a "bloody political satire" and as a homage to the films of American director Robert Altman. British film critic Tony Rayns makes a cameo in the film, appearing as a tourist in the scene where Patrick watches the changing ceremony of the guards at Gyeongbokgung Palace.

Director Kim Seon started writing the screenplay after the 2008 mad cow disease beef scandal; he was critical of the reaction and policies of the Lee Myung-bak administration at the time. Kim Gok and Kim Seon are known for their satirical criticism of Korea's mainstream ideologies, such as capitalism and authoritarianism. Their works often include graphic content, which has led to restrictions being placed on the films.

== Plot ==
The story follows four people in pursuit of a gas mask-wearing killer. Mi-joo (Jang Liu), a 'wolf girl' with hypertrichosis, wants to become the next victim; Bo-sik (Park Ji-hwan), who wears a self-made superhero costume, dreams of subduing the killer; Seoul mayor candidate Joo Sang-geun (Cho Young-jin) received a mysterious death threat that may have come from the killer; American marine Patrick (Patrick Smith) believes that his girlfriend was one of the victims.

== Cast ==
- Park Ji-hwan as Bo-sik
- Jang Liu as Mi-jo
- Cho Young-jin as Joo Sang-geun
- Patrick Smith as Patrick

== Release & reception ==
The film was released on August 22, 2013. It was initially screened at several international film festivals, receiving nominations for "Best Film" at the Venice Film Festival and "Grand Prize" at Tokyo FILMeX. Kim Bo-yeon (visiting Cine21 reporter) criticized the fragmented story arc and the profundity of surrealism and metaphor, stating that those elements made the film difficult to follow.
