= Fred Kudjo Kuwornu =

Italian filmmaker

- Born: Fred Kudjo Kuwornu; September 6, 1971 (age 55); Bologna, Italy
- Education: University of Bologna
- Occupations: Director, producer, writer, educator, author, civil activist
- Years active: 1998–present
- Parents: Perviss Kuwornu (father); Alessandra Giacomelli (mother)

Fred Kudjo Kuwornu (born 6 September 1971), is an Italian-Ghanaian filmmaker, producer, film curator, and educator who holds both Italian and American citizenship, based in New York.

He is best known as the director of critically acclaimed documentaries such as Blaxploitalian 100 Years of Blackness in Italian Cinema, Inside Buffalo, and 18 IUS SOLI. His documentaries deal with political and social themes, such as racism, interracial relations, diversity, Afro-Italians and Black diasporic identity in Italy, and the African diaspora in the world. He is the first Italian of African descent to become a film director. On 31 January 2024, it was announced that Kuwornu was invited at the 60th Venice Biennale in 2024 organized by Adriano Pedrosa.

In 2025, Fred Kuwornu was awarded the Dan David Prize, recognizing his work in public history.

== Personal life ==
Kuwornu was born on 6 September 1971 in Bologna, Italy, to an Italian mother and a Ghanaian father. His mother, Alessandra Giacomelli, is a native of Bologna. His father, Perviss Kuwornu, is from a village in Volta Region, Ghana, who arrived in Italy in 1965 to study medicine and was graduated from the University of Bologna. His father specialized in cardiac surgery and general medicine. Kuwornu grew up in Bologna, then moved to Ghana, Ferrara, and Rome. After attending high school in Italy and USA, Kuwornu obtained his degree in political science and mass media from the University of Bologna.

== Career ==
At 16, he worked as speaker for Radio Estense, a local radio in Ferrara, hence refining his creative skills along with his passion for music during the years of the success of Rap and House in Italian culture. His career as a disc jockey continued for the next 15 years for different radio stations, including Radio Bologna International and Radio Jam FM. Under the pseudonym “Freddy Goes To House” he worked as producer for the record label Mantra Vibes, producing the dance single tracks “The Whistle” (1998) and “Sun Train” (1999). He ended his radio career when he moved to Rome to work in cinema and television.

In Rome, Kuwornu conducted the television program Zengi on La7 in 2001 to 2002. He debuted as an actor in the television serial Un papà quasi perfetto that was directed by Maurizio dell’Orso. He also worked as television writer for RAI for a television travel show entitled Italia Che vai.

In 2003, he directed his short film, Natale in Autogrill. The film became a finalist at the Festival dei Due Mondi of Spoleto. In 2008, he quit television to pursue a career in filmmaking. In 2008, he started his film career as a production assistant on the set of Miracle at St. Anna, a film based on the Nazi massacre in St. Anna di Stazzema, Italy, directed by Spike Lee. After that experience, in 2010 he made his own documentary, "Inside Buffalo", about the African-American soldiers who helped liberate Italy from the Nazis. The documentary includes interviews with African-American veterans and Laz Alonso, Omar Benson Miller, Derek Luke, and writer James McBride. The film received critical acclaim and later won the award for Best Documentary at the Black International Cinema Berlin festival. Meanwhile, the film was highly praised by former presidents Bill Clinton, Barack Obama, and Giorgio Napolitano.

In 2011, during a ceremony at the Houston Museum of Fine Arts, Congresswoman Sheila Jackson Lee honored Fred Kuwornu with a certificate from the U.S. Congress in recognition of his work contributing to preservation of the memory of and the contributions of African-American soldiers during World War II.

In 2011, Kuwornu became a civil rights activist for the so-called "Second Generation Italians" – children of immigrants born in Italy but who, because of the Ius Sanguinis law, are not allowed to earn citizenship automatically until they are 18 years old. His 2018 film 18 Ius Soli deals with multiculturalism in Italy and the children of immigrants who are born and raised in Italy but not yet granted Italian citizenship. The film later became one of the first documentaries for social change produced and distributed in Italy. Later the film won the 2012 Ilaria Alpi prize. With the help of an independent and self-created platform, between 2012 and 2106 18 Ius Soli was shown in Italy more than 800 times, at events hosted by cultural associations, schools, universities, and towns, hence fostering the debate on citizenship for the native-born children of immigrants, including writer Roberto Saviano, who praised 18 Ius Soli as a unique testimony of the events. The film also was shown abroad, especially in the USA, inserting itself into heated discussions about global immigration there.

In 2013, Kuwornu moved his production company, Do the Right Films, to Brooklyn. There, in 2016, he produced Blaxploitalian, another documentary for social change, this time focusing on media representation. In this work, Kuwornu documented the history of African, African-American, and Caribbean actors in Italian cinema. It starts with the 1915 silent film Salambò, continues with Neorealism and the 1970s cinema, to reach the contemporary age. Partially inspired by his own experiences as a cinema viewer, Kuwornu's intention with this work was to give voice to actors who had been reduced historically to silence and to stereotypes created when ethnic actors are only given roles as illegal immigrants, drug dealers, prostitutes, cleaning ladies, etc. Among the interviews in the documentary, there are those of former Miss Italia Denny Mendez, the Dominican actress Iris Peynado, the African-American Harold Bradley, and an icon for "Blaxploitation", Fred Williamson.

The documentary became part of the campaign #DiversityMediaMatters, initiated by Kuwornu and aimed at promoting diversity in the global film and television industries, which would be raised and addressed the following year by Idris Elba, Will Smith, and Spike Lee. Commenting on Blaxploitalian, Sheril D. Antonio, dean of the NYU Tisch School of the Arts said: "Blaxploitalian is such an important work. It continues the conversation about Blacks in the west. It joins forces with W.E.B. DuBois (Double Consciousness); Paul Gilroy (Black Atlantic); Stuart Hall and many other scholars and filmmaker who speak about 'Black being both inside and outside the West'.”

In 2016, Cheryl Boone Isaacs, president of the Academy Awards, invited Kuwornu and the actor-activist Danny Glover to host an event on diversity in the film industry. That same year, at the Festa del Cinema di Roma, Kuwornu launched the initiative "United Artists for Italy", which supports Black Italian actors and their struggle for more visibility. Between 2016 and 2017, Kuwornu attended many international events on the film industry, such as in Brasil, al Encontro de Cinema Negro Zózimo Bulbul, in Ghana at The National Film and Television Institute, in Spain at the festival Cine Africano, as well as in South Africa, Tanzania, Netherlands, United Kingdom, and France, hence becoming an internationally renowned figure on diversity and inclusion. Blaxploitalian was presented at film festivals such as the San Francisco Black Film Festival, Pan African Film Festival Los Angeles, Festa del Cinema di Roma, Baltimore International Film Festival, Eko International Film Festival Lagos, Atlanta Docufest, Martinique Film Festival, Canada World International Film Festival, Martha’s Vineyard Film Festival, New Voices in Black Cinema BAM, and Zanzibar International Film Festival.

== Filmography ==
Year	Film	Role	Genre	Ref.
2002	Un papà quasi perfetto	Actor	Television series	
2003	Natale in Autogril	Director	Short film	
2005	Miracle at St. Anna	Production assistant, Actor: uncredited role	Short film	
2007	Virgin Territory	Stunts	Film	
2008	Amatemi	Actor	Short film	
2008	Discovering the Buffalo	producer	Documentary	
2010	Inside Buffalo	Director, executive producer, writer	Documentary	
2011	18 IUS SOLI	Director, executive producer	Documentary	
2016	Blaxploitalian:100 Years of Blackness in Italian Cinema	Director, executive producer, writer	Documentary	
2021	Mothers & Daughters: Stories of women from Latin America in Italy	Producer	Documentary short	
2025	We Were Here: The Untold History of Black Africans in Renaissance Europe	Producer, executive producer, director, writer	Documentary	

== See also ==
- Films about immigration to Italy
