= Nina Lath Gupta =

Indian film producer

- Born: India
- Other name: Nina Lath
- Occupations: Film producer, entrepreneur
- Years active: 1989–present
- Known for: Film Bazaar

Nina Lath Gupta also known as Nina Lath is an Indian film producer and former civil servant known for her contributions to the Indian film industry, particularly through the National Film Development Corporation (NFDC). Her contributions in cinema have been acknowledged through various media streams in India and abroad.

== Career ==
Gupta began her career as a civil servant in the Indian Revenue Service. She was the managing director of NFDC from 2006 to 2018. Her contract with NFDC was terminated in 2018 by the Ministry of Information & Broadcasting of India on account of alleged mismanagement and non-compliance with government protocols. The dismissal was later overturned by the Delhi High Court in 2023, a decision upheld by the Supreme Court of India in 2024.

=== Film Bazaar ===
She launched Film Bazaar in 2007 during her time at NFDC, an initiative to connect filmmakers with buyers and sellers of movie rights and create international collaborations for Indian cinema. This initiative has launched a number of films under its banner such as Lunch Box, Margarita With A Straw, Chauthi Koot, Qissa, Ship of Theseus, Titli, Court, Anhe Ghode Da Daan, Miss Lovely, Dum Lagake Haisha, Liar's Dice. and Thithi.

=== Cinemas of India ===
Cinemas of India was launched in 2012 by Gupta, a distribution brand to release the restored versions of classic NFDC films for the contemporary audience.

=== Cinevesture ===
After her tenure at NFDC, Gupta founded Cinevesture, a platform designed to connect creators and investors in the film industry.

== Filmography ==
Nina Lath Gupta has produced and co-produced a number of acclaimed films which include:

- Manjhi: The Mountain Man (2015)
- Island City (2015)
- Chauranga (2014)
- Qissa: The Tale of a Lonely Ghost (2013)
- The Lunchbox (2013)
