= Lost Kisses (2010 film) =

- Directed by: Roberta Torre
- Screenplay by: Roberta Torre
- Story by: Roberta Torre
- Produced by: Amedeo Bacigalupo
- Starring: Donatella Finocchiaro; Pino Micol; Giuseppe Fiorello; Carla Marchese; Piera Degli Esposti
- Cinematography: Fabio Zamarion
- Edited by: Osvaldo Bargero
- Music by: Federico Di Giambattista; Andrea Fabiani
- Production companies: Nuvola Film; Rosetta Film
- Distributed by: CDE Videa
- Release dates: 3 September 2010 (Venice); 29 April 2011 (Italy)
- Running time: 80 minutes
- Country: Italy
- Language: Italian

Lost Kisses (Italian: I baci mai dati) is a 2010 Italian comedy-drama film directed by Roberta Torre and based on a story by Torre.

== Plot ==
When the head of her town's Virgin Mary statue goes missing, 13-year-old Manuela (Carla Marchese) claims that Mary came to her in a dream and told her where it could be found. After the missing piece of the statue is located, Manuela gains a reputation as a miracle worker.

== Cast ==
- Carla Marchese as Manuela
- Donatella Finocchiaro as Rita
- Piera Degli Esposti as Viola
- Pino Micol as Don Livio
- Giuseppe Fiorello as Giulio

== Awards and nominations ==
- Brian Award at the 67th Venice International Film Festival.
