= Zabat Peak =

Peak in Bulgaria

Zabat (Зъбът)
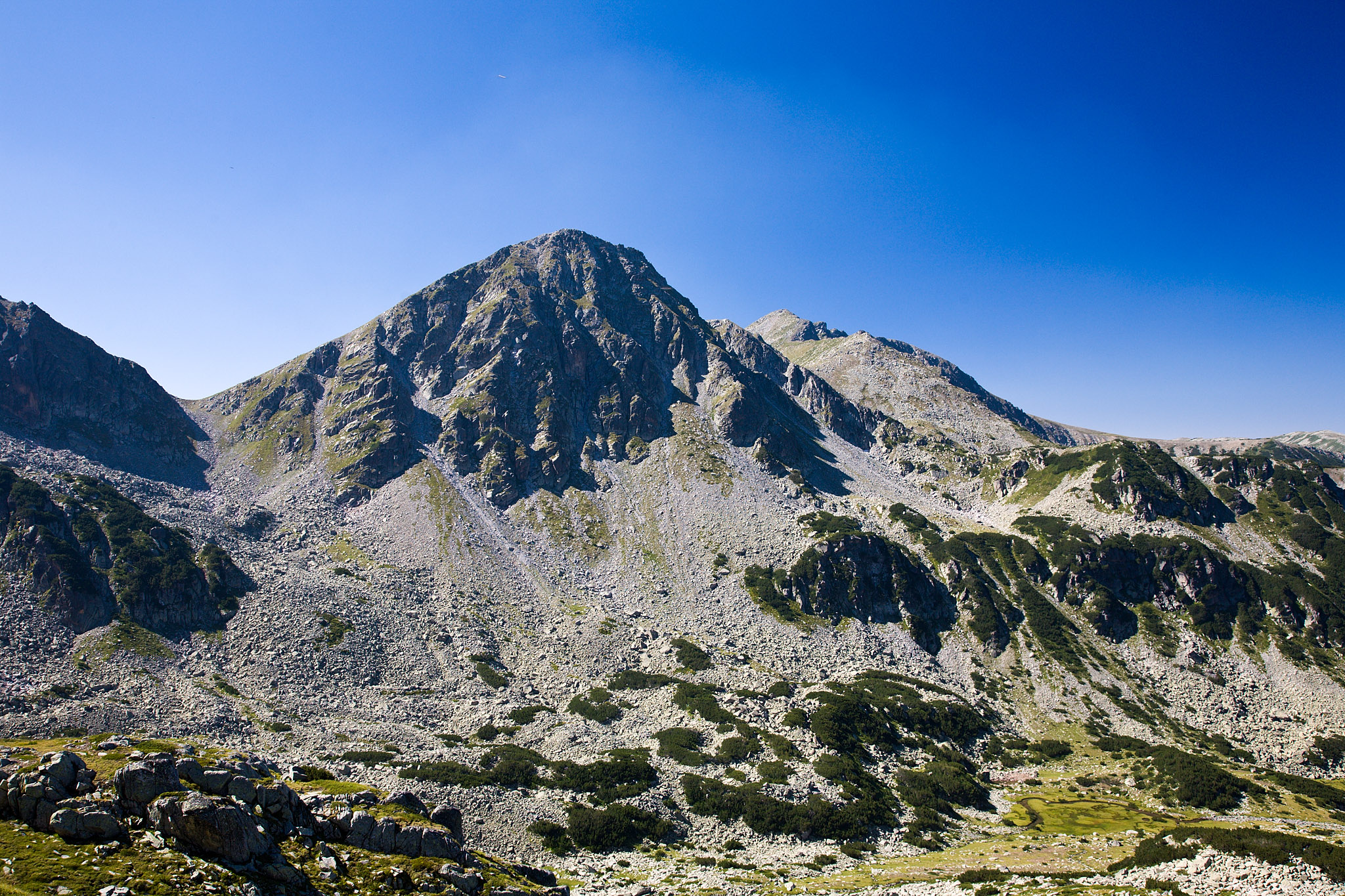

Highest point
- Elevation: 2,688 m (8,819 ft)
- Coordinates: 41°40′14″N 23°28′38″E

Geography
- Location: Blagoevgrad Province, Bulgaria
- Parent range: Pirin Mountains

Zabat (Bulgarian: Зъбът, meaning The Fang) is a 2,688 m high peak in the Pirin mountain range, south-western Bulgaria. Built up of granite, it is located in the northern part of Pirin in the central section of the Kamenitsa secondary ridge. Seen from Begovitsa cirque its shape resembles a tooth, hence its name.

To the north and northwest of summit peak stretches the pebbly Begovitsa cirque. The slopes in that direction are steep and rocky opening to a vast area of rocks. South of Zabat are the lush pastures of the Bashmandra cirque, where the slopes are significantly more oblique and covered with grass. There are several cold springs, which give rise to the Bashmandra river, a tribute of the Pirinska Bistritsa. To the east of Zabat on the Kamenitsa secondary ridge is located the summit Yalovarnika (2,763 m), connected via a short easy-to-pass saddle that divides the cirques Bashmandra and Begovitsa. To the south-southwest of Zabat along the ridge is the massif Kuklite (2,686 m). The saddle connecting them is quite steep and short near Zabat and much longer and oblique towards Kuklite. A marked trail between Begovitsa and Demyanitsa refuge follows the saddle.
