= Dagmawi Yimer =

Ethiopian-born Italian filmmaker

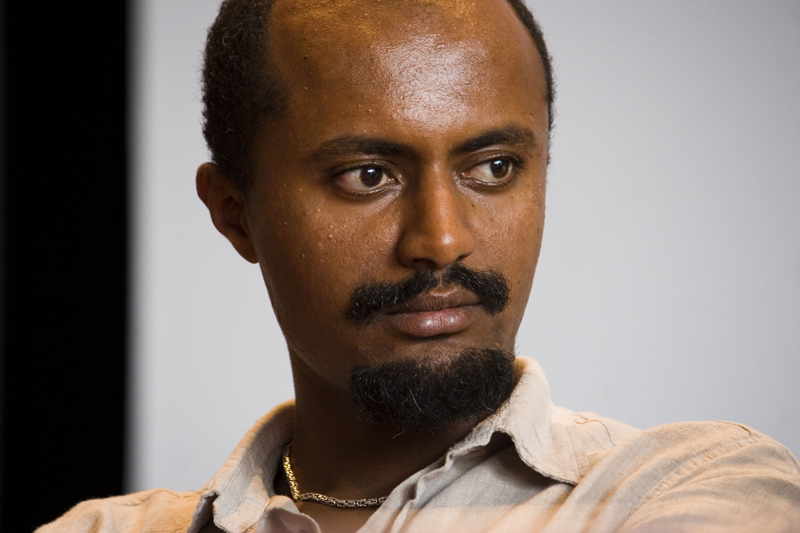
- Born: Dagmawi Yimer; December 6, 1977 (age 48); Addis Ababa, Ethiopia
- Occupations: Director, cinematographer, writer
- Years active: 2006–present

Dagmawi Yimer (born 6 December 1977), is an Ethiopian-born Italian filmmaker. He is also the co-founder and vice president of the Archivio delle Memorie Migranti.

== Personal life ==
He was born on 6 December 1977 in a small town Kirkos, Addis Ababa, Ethiopia. Before he left the country, he studied law in Addis Ababa in 2003.

== Career ==
In 2005, he left Ethiopia due to strong post-political unrest. He left the home without notifying his father but only his mother and sister. He crossed the desert between the Sudan and Libya and later crossed Mediterranean in late July 2006, reaching Lampedusa after a perilous journey. He has lived in Italy since July 2006. In May 2007, he attended to the video-narration course of the Asinitas association in Rome. During this period, he made his first documentary The Desert And the Sea in collaboration with Asinitas, Zalab and Aamod.

Meanwhile, he moved to linguistic and cultural mediation for the Asinitas Onlus association, within the same Italian school for asylum seekers, refugees and migrants. During the years from 2007 to 2008, Yimer made the popular short films: Lo scabocchio, Le sagome, and Caravan. Then he made the short Welcome to your home together with Marco Carsetti. Then he was the co-author of the biographical documentary Come un uomo sulla terra centered on migration from Libya to Europe. The film was produced by Asinitas Onlus, with the collaboration of Zalab. In 2009, Yimer received a Special Mention at BIF & ST for the documentary.

In 2011, he made the film Solo il mare, focused on the island of Lampedusa. Then in 2013, Yimer made Va 'Pensiero based on the cross story of two racist attacks in Milan and Florence. In 2015, he made two films: Asmat-Names and Benvenuti in Italia.

== Filmography ==
Year	Film	Role	Genre	Ref.
2007	Caravan	Director	Short film	
2007	Le sagome	Director	Short film	
2008	Lo scabocchio	Director	Short film	
2008	Welcome to your home	Director	Short film	
2008	Come un uomo sulla terra	Director, writer	Documentary	
2011	Solo il mare	Director	Film	
2013	To Whom It May Concern	Cinematographer	Documentary short	
2013	Va' pensiero - Storie ambulanti	Director, cinematographer	Documentary	
