= Olivier Zabat =

French artist and director

Olivier Zabat (French: [zaba]) is a French artist and director of experimental documentary films. He was born in 1965 in Grenoble, France. He teaches video and coordinates the digital media department at the Ecole nationale des Beaux-arts de Lyon.

== Distribution and awards ==
Olivier Zabat's films are shown in theaters, on television (Arte), in contemporary art exhibitions and in international documentary and film festivals, in particular in the avant-garde and experimental sections. Zabat has received the Villa Medicis Hors les Murs award twice, once in the Art category and once in Video which enabled him to film in Brazil. In 2001, Zona Oeste was shown at the International Film Festival Rotterdam (Netherlands), in the main short film category, but also at the Walker Arts Center in Minneapolis (U.S.A.) and the following year at the International Short Film Festival Oberhausen (Germany). In 2002, Miguel et les Mines was presented at the Entrevues Belfort Film Festival (France) after its first showing as an installation at the ARC, City of Paris' Museum of Modern Art and in the exhibition « the History of Modern Conflict » at the Imperial War Museum in London (UK).

In 2004, he received the Grand Prix of the French Competition at the International Documentary Film Festival Marseilles (France) for 1/3 of the eyes which was ranked one of the top ten films of 2005 by the Cahiers du Cinéma. The same year, he participated in the international contemporary art exhibition Manifesta 5 in San Sebastian, the exhibition "Unique But Not the Only: French Contemporary Art" at the Guangdong Museum of Art (China) and the event "The Government " in Vienna (Austria) and Miami (U.S.A). In 2006, he participated in the International Film Festival Prague (Czech Republic); his short film Don’t touch me has been shown in various art spaces, including the South London Gallery and the Bischoff Weiss Gallery (UK). In 2008, his film Yves was shown on the channel Arte on the program La Lucarne. Zabat's film Fading was selected for the Orizzonti competition in the 67th Venice International Film Festival in 2010 and for the Cinema of the Future Competition at BAFICI, the Buenos Aires International Independent Film Festival (Argentina) in 2011.

His work was also shown in “Art in the 21st Century, Day for Night1– Between Reality and Illusion” at the Community University in New York. His film Basement perspective was in competition at the Locarno Film Festival (Switzerland) in 2012, in the Corti d'artista section. In September 2013, he showed three video installations at the Lofoten International Art Festival (Norway) and in November 2013, his short film Silent Minutes was selected for competition in the CinemaXXI section of the Rome Film Festival (Italy). Olivier Zabat had an exhibition of his new works at the Musée d'Art Contemporain of Lyon in March–June 2017, named "The noise". In 2019, his film Arguments has been selected at the Locarno Film Festival (Switzerland), official selection Fuori Concorso, was shown at the French Cinemathèque of Paris for its French avant-première and took part to the Doc Fortnight 2020 of the Museum of Modern Art (MoMA) of New York (USA). It won the Mario Ruspoli Prize at the Jean Rouch International Film Festival in 2020.

== Axes of work ==
At the basis of Zabat's work is a reflection on the forms taken by, and issues surrounding, contemporary representation of reality at once as the foundation of the artistic process, but also as human experience and a sociological and political marker. Since 1996 he has been entirely committed to an artistic approach involving an independent exploration in film, which favors video over photography, because he prefers “metamorphosis to fixing”. Olivier Zabat works on the image during the filming process with protagonists in difficult situations, sometimes even in situations of individual or collective crisis: mourning, illness, combat, accident, handicap, conflict, exclusion, criminality, war... In these situations means of resistance, resilience, and preservation of individual integrity come sharply to the fore, as do the problematics inherent in representation, such as incommunicability, anonymity, the unrepresentable, obscurity, blindness, ineffability and invisibility. In all of his films, both the participants and Zabat himself are trying to “see” and transmit their vision to viewers. From his first film on, Olivier Zabat has been interested in the founding principles and evolutions of the cinema and of means of representation in general. He explores different forms of communication and cinematographic narration, but also the relationships people have with their own image in a culture profoundly influenced by cinema, television, and new images.

== Critical assessment ==
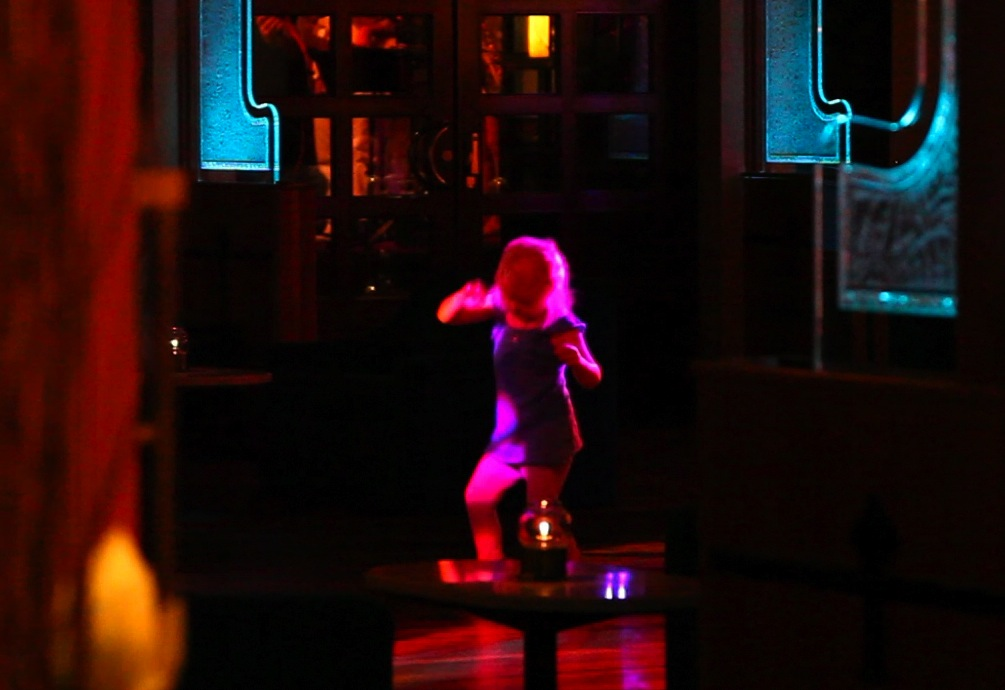
Silent minutes - Olivier Zabat 2013

Thus in Zona Oeste, "the ambiguous relationship of the real to its mise en scène” is striking, “to the extent that we no longer really know which came first” but “something ineffable is always present, behind things and images” and the film “has only one horizon, the bottom of things”. In Miguel et les mines, “six autonomous segments combine to explore two questions: how blows are dealt with, and how to represent perception transformed by the fear of an explosion?". 1/3 des yeux could be “a blindness admitted by the film, diminished faculties of perception and deliberate partiality, an “unexpected response to the autarky of the view point” with its structure which integrates “the accidental – sometimes very poetical – charge which is part of the very recording of reality, what Zabat calls “spontaneous dramas” (and which) “create a real acuity in the viewer” : the object of the film is “the construction of the gaze”. In Yves, Olivier Zabat “is not doing a portrait” (of this man) “he is attempting to reconstruct his relationship to reality, which is more complex than it might appear”. Fading, “with a mobile phone and a few plays of chiaroscuro, reaffirms the omnipotence of the image”, “it is a question of apprehending the film as visual, sound and textual material, with bursts and fades.(...). From one story to the next, the same desire for the image – which is also a desire for vision - is expressed.(...) Although it is very much rooted in the contemporary, Fading is also marked by a form of primitivism, with this vacillating light that is the cinema, and this eye that watches and imagines it”. As for Perspective du sous-sol, Olivier Zabat tracks an actor and strongman “answering the call of a supreme entity called the Seventh Art”., (and puts him to the test with a fight and a monologue), “weird hand-to-hand choreography, really violent in the heaviness and the slowness of the conflict, which is continually wavering between resistance and exhaustion, bringing a singular visual reality to the symbolics of the text”. In Arguments, “the challenge” (of voice hearers) “overlaps so fully with that of the filmmaker’s, whose delicately empathic staging seems to act from within through the activities of his subjects”.“Instead of focusing on the strangeness that this affliction opposes in the viewer, Olivier Zabat filmed those moments in life that voice-hearers share with the rest of us until their world no longer appears as a parallel universe, but as an augmented reality”.

== Selected filmography ==
- 2001 : Zona Oeste : 42' 4×3. Portuguese.
- 2001 : Women are sentimental : 12' 4×3. Portuguese.
- 2001 : Le complexe de l'Allemand : 12' 4×3. Portuguese.
- 2002 : Miguel and the Mines : 50' 4×3. French, English.
- 2004 : 1/3 of the eyes : 70' 4×3. French, English, Albanese.
- 2006 : Don't touch me, 12', 4x3. French.
- 2006 : Enemies, 13', 16/9. Thaï.
- 2007 : Yves : 74' 16/9. French.
- 2010 : Fading : 59' 16/9. French, Polish.
- 2012 : Basement Perspective 28' 16/9. English, Finnish, French. With Jouko Ahola.
- 2013 : Kidding : 3 x 10'. Thai.
- 2013 : Silent minutes : 13'. Split screen. English. With Colin Bryce
- 2019 : Arguments: 108', 16/9. English.
- 2026 : The waterline: 114', 16/9. French.

== Monography ==
Olivier Zabat, Images & Documents, éditions ADERA [archive], 2016. ISBN 978-2-917498-15-6
