= Andrea Segre =

Italian film director (born 1976)

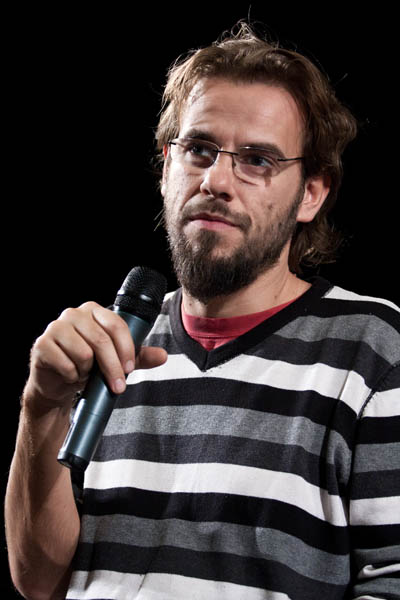
- Segre in 2011
- Born: 6 September 1976 (age 49); Dolo, Veneto, Italy
- Occupation: Film director
- Years active: 2004–present

Andrea Segre (born 6 September 1976) is an Italian film director. He has directed more than ten films since 2004.

== Filmography ==
Fiction

- 2007 La mal'ombra
- 2009 Magari le cose cambiano
- 2011 Shun Li and the Poet
- 2013 First Snowfall
- 2017 The Order of Things
- 2024 The Great Ambition

Documentaries

- 2004 Dio era un musicista
- 2006 Checosamanca
- 2008 Come un uomo sulla terra
- 2010 Il sangue verde
- 2012 Mare chiuso
- 2013 Rebetiko Crisis: Undue Debt
- 2014 Come il peso dell'acqua
- 2015 I sogni del lago salato
- 2017 Ibi
- 2021 Venetian Molecules (Molecole)

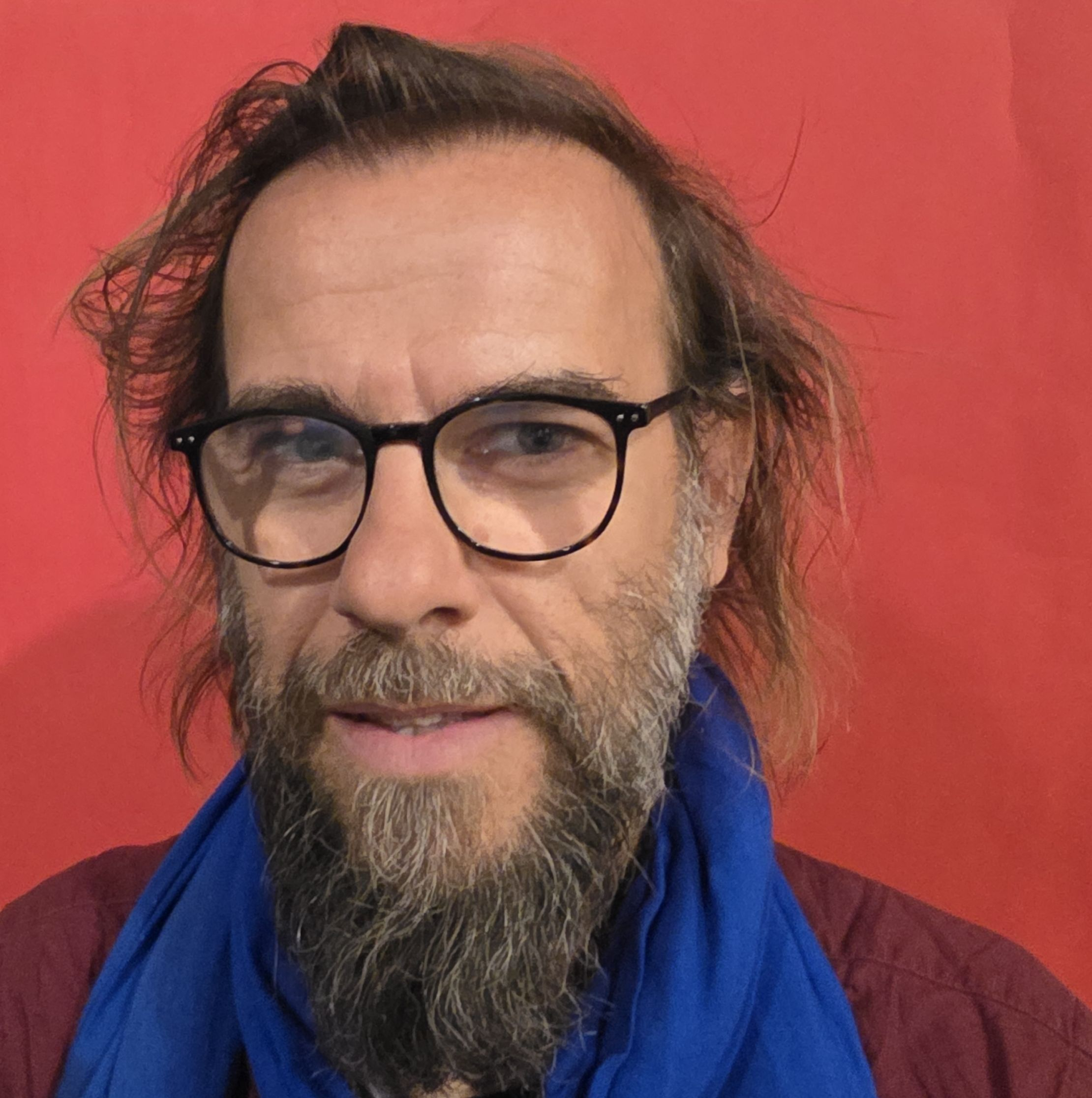
Segre 2025 in Zurich.
