= List of Italian films of 2013 =

This is a list of Italian films first released in 2013 (see 2013 in film).

Title	Director	Cast	Genre
2013
Amiche da morire	Giorgia Farina	Claudia Gerini, Cristiana Capotondi, Sabrina Impacciatore	Black comedy
L'arbitro	Paolo Zucca	Stefano Accorsi, Geppi Cucciari	Comedy
The Art of Happiness	Alessandro Rak	Renato Carpentieri	Animation
The Best Offer	Giuseppe Tornatore	Geoffrey Rush, Jim Sturgess, Sylvia Hoeks	Mystery
Cha cha cha	Marco Risi	Luca Argentero, Eva Herzigová, Claudio Amendola	Crime-thriller
The Chair of Happiness	Carlo Mazzacurati	Valerio Mastandrea, Isabella Ragonese, Giuseppe Battiston	Comedy
The Fifth Wheel	Giovanni Veronesi	Elio Germano, Alessandra Mastronardi, Ricky Memphis	Comedy-drama
First Snowfall	Andrea Segre	Anita Caprioli, Giuseppe Battiston	Drama
A Five Star Life	Maria Sole Tognazzi	Margherita Buy, Stefano Accorsi	Comedy-drama
Il Futuro	Alicia Scherson	Manuela Martelli, Rutger Hauer	Drama
The Great Beauty	Paolo Sorrentino	Toni Servillo, Carlo Verdone, Sabrina Ferilli	Comedy-drama
How Strange to Be Named Federico	Ettore Scola	Federico Fellini	Documentary
Human Capital	Paolo Virzì	Fabrizio Bentivoglio, Valeria Bruni Tedeschi, Fabrizio Gifuni	Crime-drama
The Human Factor	Bruno Oliviero	Silvio Orlando, Giuseppe Battiston	Neo-noir
Indovina chi viene a Natale?	Fausto Brizzi	Claudio Bisio, Diego Abatantuono, Cristiana Capotondi, Raoul Bova	Comedy
L'intrepido	Gianni Amelio	Antonio Albanese	Comedy-drama
Long Live Freedom	Roberto Andò	Toni Servillo, Valerio Mastandrea, Valeria Bruni Tedeschi	Comedy-drama
The Mafia Kills Only in Summer	Pif	Pif, Cristiana Capotondi, Claudio Gioè	Black comedy
Miele	Valeria Golino	Jasmine Trinca, Carlo Cecchi	Drama
The Mongrel	Alessandro Gassmann	Alessandro Gassmann, Giovanni Anzaldo	Thriller
The Move of The Penguin	Claudio Amendola	Edoardo Leo, Ricky Memphis, Ennio Fantastichini	Comedy
Neverlake	Riccardo Paoletti	Daisy Keeping, Joy Tanner	Horror
Out of the Blue	Edoardo Leo	Raoul Bova, Edoardo Leo, Marco Giallini	Comedy
ReWined	Ferdinando Vicentini Orgnani	Vincenzo Amato, Giovanna Mezzogiorno	Neo-noir
Il Rosa Nudo	Giovanni Coda	Gianni Dettori	Drama
Sacro GRA	Gianfranco Rosi	-	Documentary
Salvo	Fabio Grassadonia, Antonio Piazza	Saleh Bakri, Sara Serraiocco, Luigi Lo Cascio	Crime-drama
See You Tomorrow	Andrea Zaccariello	Enrico Brignano, Burt Young, Francesca Inaudi	Comedy
Siberian Education	Gabriele Salvatores	John Malkovich, Peter Stormare	Crime-drama
A Small Southern Enterprise	Rocco Papaleo	Riccardo Scamarcio, Barbora Bobulova, Sarah Felberbaum	Comedy
Sole a catinelle	Gennaro Nunziante	Checco Zalone, Robert Dancs	Comedy
Song'e Napule	Manetti Bros.	Alessandro Roja, Giampaolo Morelli, Serena Rossi	Crime-comedy
Stay Away from Me	Alessio Maria Federici	Enrico Brignano, Ambra Angiolini	Comedy
Still Life	Uberto Pasolini	Eddie Marsan, Joanne Froggatt	Drama
Stop the Pounding Heart	Roberto Minervini	Sara Carlson	Documentary
A Street in Palermo	Emma Dante	Emma Dante, Alba Rohrwacher, Elena Cotta	Drama
Studio illegale	Umberto Carteni	Fabio Volo, Zoé Félix	Comedy
There Will Come a Day	Giorgio Diritti	Jasmine Trinca, Anne Alvaro	Drama
The Third Half	Enrico Maria Artale	Lorenzo Richelmy, Stefania Rocca	Sport drama
Those Happy Years	Daniele Luchetti	Kim Rossi Stuart, Micaela Ramazzotti	Drama
Trilussa - Storia d'amore e di poesia	Lodovico Gasparini	Michele Placido, Monica Guerritore	Biographical
White as Milk, Red as Blood	Giacomo Campiotti	Filippo Scicchitano, Aurora Ruffino, Luca Argentero	Romance
Women Drive Me Crazy	Fausto Brizzi	Francesco Mandelli, Loretta Goggi, Chiara Francini	Comedy
Zombie Massacre	Luca Boni, Marco Ristori	Christian Boeving, Mike Mitchell	Horror
Zoran, My Nephew the Idiot	Matteo Oleotto	Giuseppe Battiston, Rok Prasnikar, Roberto Citran	Comedy

== See also ==
- 2013 in Italy
- 2013 in Italian television
