= 2013 in Italian television =

This is a list of Italian television related events from 2013.

== Events ==
- 16 March – 22-year-old singer Daniel Adomako wins the fourth season of Italia's Got Talent.
- 30 May – Elhaida Dani wins the first season of The Voice of Italy.
- 9 November – 50-year-old ventriloquist Samuel Barletti wins the fifth season of Italia's Got Talent.
- 7 December – Olympic gold medal fencer Elisa Di Francisca and her partner Raimondo Todaro win the ninth season of Ballando con le stelle.
- 12 December – Michele Bravi wins the seventh season of X Factor.

== Debuts ==
- 7 March – The Voice of Italy (2013–present)

== Television shows ==
=== Drama ===
- Gli anni spezzati ("The broken years") – by Graziano Diana, cycle of three TV-movies in 2 episodes about the Italian red terrorism: The superintendent (with Emilio Solfrizzi as Lugi Calabresi), The judge (with Alessandro Preziosi as Mario Sossi) and The engineer (with Alessio Boni as an imaginary FIAT manager).
- Barabbas – by Roger Young, from the Par Lagerkvist's novel, with Billy Zane in the title role and Cristiana Capotondi; 2 episodes.
- Trilussa, storia d'amore e di poesia ("History of love and poetry") biopic by Ludovico Gasparini, with Michele Placido in the title role; 2 episodes.
- Volare, la grande storia di Domenico Modugno ("Domenico Modugno's great story") – biopic by Riccardo Milani, with Giuseppe Fiorello in the title role and Kasia Smutniak as the wife Franca Gandolfi; 2 episodes.
- Anna Karenina – by Christian Duguay, from the Lev Tolstoj's novel, with Vittoria Puccini and Santiago Cabrera; 2 episodes. International coproduction.

=== Serials ===
- I Saurini e i racconti della fonte magica ("The little dinosaurs and the magic source's tales") – cartoon by Raffaele Bortone.

=== 2000s ===
- Grande Fratello (2000–present)
- Ballando con le stelle (2005–present)
- X Factor (2008–present)

=== 2010s ===
- Italia's Got Talent (2010–present)

== Networks and services ==
=== Launches ===
Network	Type	Launch date	Notes	Source
Sky Sport F1	Cable and satellite	18 February		
Sky Sport F1 HD	Cable and satellite	18 February		
Top Crime	Cable and satellite	1 June		
Fox Sports	Cable and satellite	9 August		
Ka-Boom	Cable and satellite	23 September		
Fox Sports 2	Cable and satellite	20 December		

=== Closures ===
Network	Type	Closure date	Notes	Source
Steel	Cable and satellite	1 April		
Repubblica TV	Cable and satellite	11 May		
Sportitalia 24	Cable and satellite	10 November		
Music Box Italia	Cable and satellite	31 December		

== See also ==
- 2013 in Italy
- List of Italian films of 2013
