= Roger Rueff =

American writer

Roger M. Rueff is a writer whose produced dramatic works include stage plays, teleplays, and screenplays.

== Early life ==
Rueff was born in Upland, California and grew up in Denver, Colorado. He earned a B.Sc. in 1978, an M.Sc. in 1983 and a Ph.D. in 1985 in Chemical and Petroleum Refining Engineering at the Colorado School of Mines.

== Career ==
His stage play Hospitality Suite premiered at South Coast Repertory in Costa Mesa, California in 1992 and has been subsequently produced internationally. So Many Words also premiered at South Coast Rep, where it garnered two awards from the Los Angeles Drama Critics Circle: one for best writing, and the other for best play to receive its world premiere in Los Angeles or Orange counties (the Ted Schmitt Award).

Rueff's works for the screen include the teleplay God Lives produced by the Magic Door Children's Theater in Chicago and The Big Kahuna, his screen adaptation of Hospitality Suite, starring Kevin Spacey and Danny DeVito. The Big Kahuna premiered at the Toronto International Film Festival in September, 1999, and was one of three films nominated for the 2000 Humanitas Prize for independent film.

In 2011, he collaborated with the Italian screenwriter Nicola Barile, author of The Art of Happiness, at the international Boys & Girls web series, directed by Fulvio Iannucci and co-funded by the European Community to raise awareness among European teenagers on some topics, such as nutrition, the use of alcohol, drugs, and sexual behaviors.
