= Bullied to Death =

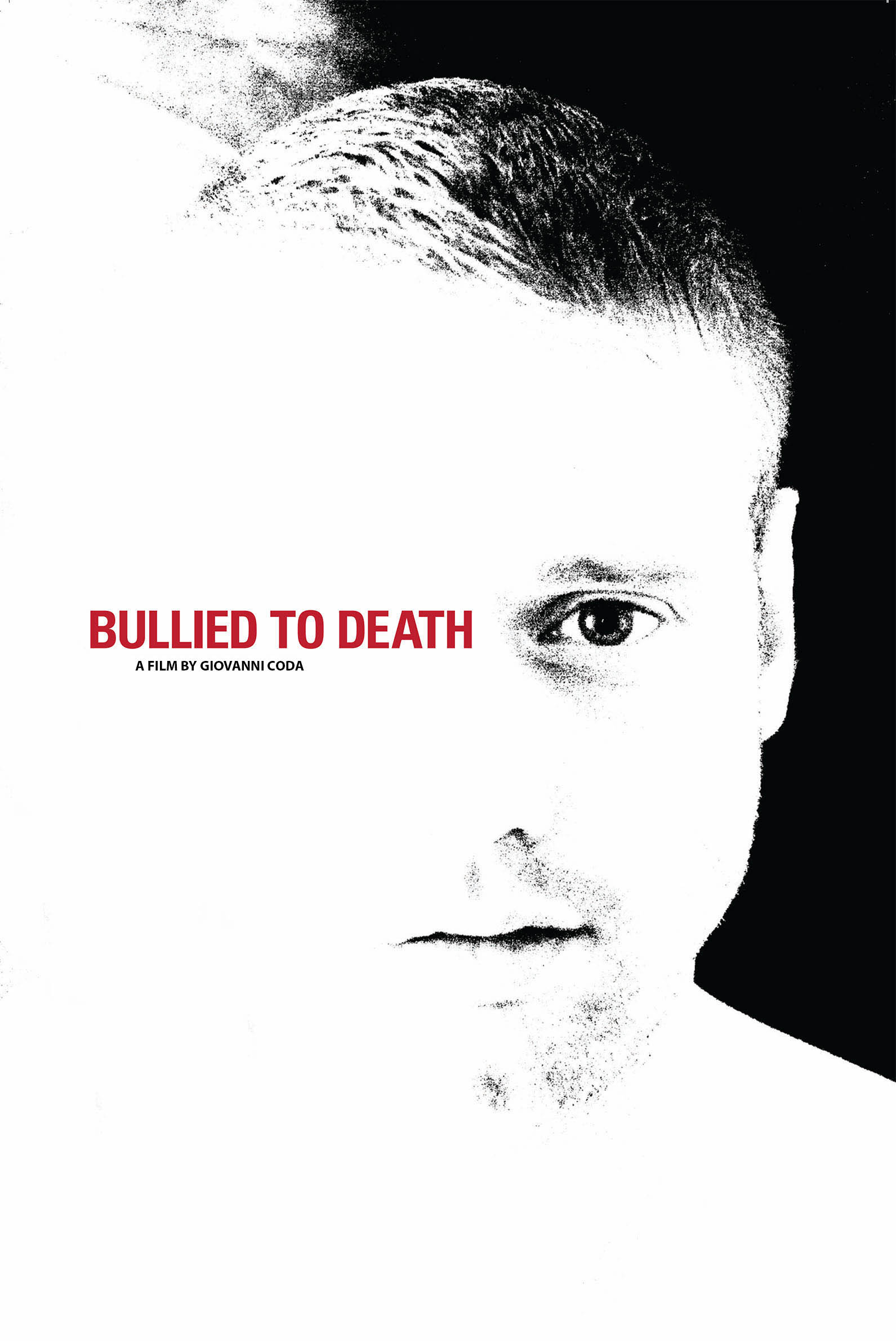
- Theatrical release poster
- Directed by: Giovanni Coda
- Written by: Giovanni Coda
- Starring: Tendal Mann; Sergio Anrò; Gianni Dettori; Assunta Pittaluga; Gianluca Sotgiu
- Narrated by: Josh Feldman; Sheri Mann Stewart
- Music by: Maddalena Bianchi; Cosimo Morleo; Les Sticks Fluo; Arnaldo Pontis; Marco Rosano; Irma Toudjian
- Production companies: Zena Film, Atlantis Moon
- Release date: May 7, 2016 (Torino LGBT)
- Running time: 75 minutes
- Countries: Italy; United States
- Language: English

Bullied to Death is a 2016 Italian-American film written and directed by Giovanni Coda, starring Tendal Mann. The film, shot in Italy and performed in English, was presented by the director and premiered during the 2016 edition of the Torino GLBT Film Festival. Bullied to Death is the second episode of the trilogy on gender-based violence started by the director with the film Il Rosa Nudo.

== Plot ==
The film is inspired by the true story of a fourteen-year-old American boy who died by suicide in the wake of a dramatic sequence of serious acts related to school bullying and cyberbullying. Bonded to this story are those of other young gay, lesbian, and transgender teenage victims of homophobic attacks, who have been killed or induced to commit suicide in different parts of the world. On May 17, 2071, sixty years after the death of the protagonist and during the International Day Against Homophobia, Transphobia and Biphobia, a group of artists gather together to create a commemorative performance that will last the whole day.

== Awards and official selections ==
- Official Selection at Torino GLBT Film Festival 2016, Turin, Italy.
- Official Selection at XX V-Art Festival Internazionale Immagine d'Autore, Cagliari, Italy.
- Official Selection at 30° Festival Mix, Milan, Italy.
- Best Avant-Garde Innovation Award at Melbourne Documentary Film Festival 2016, Australia.
- Official Selection at Macon Film Festival 2016, Usa.
- Jury Special Mention at Iris Prize Festival 2016, Cardiff, U.K.
- Film of the Week at Amsterdam New Renaissance Film Festival 2017, Amsterdam, NL.
- Special Mention Best Female Performance to Assunta Pittaluga at Italian Film Festival 2016, Cardiff, U.K.
- Special Mention Best Male Performance to Sergio Anrò at Italian Film Festival 2016, Cardiff, U.K.
- Jury Special Mention at Los Angeles Underground Film Festival, Los Angeles, USA.
- Best Feature Film Prize at Omovies Festival, Naples, Italy.
- Best Feature Film Prize at L'Aquila LGBT Film Festival, L'Aquila, Italy.
- Humanity Award 2017 at Amsterdam New Renaissance Film Festival 2017, Amsterdam, NL.

== See also ==
- Homophobia
- Violence against LGBT people
- It Gets Better Project
