= El Sicario, Room 164 =

- Directed by: Gianfranco Rosi
- Written by: Gianfranco Rosi and Charles Bowden
- Produced by: Serge Lalou and Gianfranco Rosi
- Edited by: Jacopo Quadri
- Production companies: Robofilms; Les Films d'Ici
- Distributed by: Icarus Films
- Release date: September 5, 2010 (Venice Film Festival)
- Running time: 84 minutes
- Countries: United States; France
- Language: Spanish

El Sicario, Room 164 is a 2010 documentary film directed by Gianfranco Rosi and based on an article by Charles Bowden.

== Synopsis ==
The film's subject is an anonymous Ciudad Juárez sicario known to have killed hundreds. An expert in torture and kidnapping, he was employed by Mexican drug cartels and the Chihuahua State Police simultaneously. In the film, he recounts his story to the camera inside the very hotel room he once used to hold and torture kidnapped victims, his face concealed by a black mesh hood. Using a marker and notepad, he illustrates his career of crime, murder, abduction, and torture. There exists a $250,000 bounty on his life.

== Reception ==
El Sicario, Room 164 has a score of 76 out of 100 on Metacritic and a 92% rating on Rotten Tomatoes.
