= 2013 in Italy =

- Decades: 1990s; 2000s; 2010s; 2020s; 2030s
- See also: History of Italy; Timeline of Italian history; List of years in Italy

Events in the year 2013 in Italy.

== Incumbents ==
- President: Giorgio Napolitano
- Prime Minister: Mario Monti (until 28 April), Enrico Letta (starting 28 April)

== Events ==
- January 4: The plane carrying Italian stylist Vittorio Missoni crashes in the ocean near Los Roques, Venezuela.
- February 11: Benedict XVI announced his resignation as pope
- February 12–16: Marco Mengoni won the Sanremo Music Festival.
- February 25: In the general election centre-left coalition led by Pier Luigi Bersani won an absolute majority in the Chamber of Deputies but in the Senate no party won an outright majority. The anti-establishment Five Star Movement, led by Beppe Grillo, became the first party of the country with 25.5% of votes.
- March 6:
  - A man shot and killed two people at a government office in Perugia before killing himself.
  - Death of David Rossi in Siena under unclear circumstances.
- March 13: Cardinal Jorge Mario Bergoglio is elected pope with the name of Francis.
- April 2: Zafferana Etnea, a small tourist town in the province of Catania, was covered in ash after Mount Etna erupted.
- April 20: Giorgio Napolitano was re-elected President with 738 votes in the sixth ballot amid widespread protests by MPs eager to elect Stefano Rodotà. Napolitano is the first president in the history of Italy to be re-elected for a second term.
- April 28:
  - Enrico Letta sworn in 55th prime minister of Italy.
  - During the government swearing-in ceremony, a man shoots outside Palazzo Chigi, wounding two Carabinieri and a bystander.
- May 3: Twenty people were injured and more than one hundred houses were damaged in a series of tornadoes in Northern Italy.
- May 7: The cargo ship Jolly Nero impacts the control tower of the port of Genoa, with the consequent collapse of the latter and the killing of 11 people.
- May 25: Don Pino Puglisi become blessed. He is the first case of a martyr killed by Mafia.
- June 24: Former Prime Minister Silvio Berlusconi was sentenced to seven years in prison and barred from holding public office for abusing power and having sex with an underage prostitute
- July 28: A coach plunged off a flyover in southern Italy, leaving 39 people dead and 8 injured.
- August 4: Silvio Berlusconi is convicted of tax fraud and sentenced to four years imprisonment.
- October 3: At least 339 African migrants have died and 50 are missing after a boat carrying them to Europe sank off the southern Italian island of Lampedusa.
- October 18: Italian government conducted Operation Mare Nostrum to tackle the significant increase of migratory flows to Europe.
- November 17–19: At least 18 people died in Sardinia following the massive floods caused by the Cleopatra cyclone.
- November 27: The Senate expelled former Prime Minister Silvio Berlusconi from his seat in Parliament following his conviction for tax fraud.
- December 15: The pitchforks protests broke out in Turin with hard fights between protesters, who asked the resignation of the government, and the police.

== Sport ==
- September 22–29: the 2013 UCI Road World Championships takes place in Tuscany
  - The Netherlands won the gold medal table. Ellen van Dijk (NED) and Tony Martin (GER) won the most gold medals (both 2).
- 2012–13 Serie A
- 2012–13 Serie B
- 2012–13 Coppa Italia
- 2013 Supercoppa Italiana
- 2013 Giro d'Italia
- 2013 Giro di Lombardia

== Deaths ==
- January 4 – Vittorio Missoni, 58, fashion designer, son of Ottavio
- January 14 – Prospero Gallinari, 62, terrorist and former member of the Red Brigades
- March 7 – Damiano Damiani, 90, screenwriter, film director, actor and writer
- March 21 – Pietro Mennea, 60, sprinter and politician
- March 29 – Enzo Jannacci, 77, singer-songwriter
- March 30 – Franco Califano, 74, singer-songwriter
- May 5 – Rossella Falk, 86, actress
- May 6 – Giulio Andreotti, 94, politician, 41st Prime Minister of Italy
- May 9 – Ottavio Missoni, 92, fashion designer and athlete
- May 27 – Little Tony, 72, singer
- May 29 – Franca Rame, 83, theatre actress, playwright and political activist
- June 22 – Sergio Focardi, 80, physicist and academic
- June 24 – Emilio Colombo, 93, politician, 40th Prime Minister of Italy and last surviving member of the Italian Constituent Assembly
- June 29 – Margherita Hack, 91, astrophysicist and popular science writer
- July 28 – Ersilio Tonini, 99, cardinal
- October 1 – Giuliano Gemma, 75, actor
- October 5 – Carlo Lizzani, 91, director
- October 11 – Erich Priebke, 100, German captain in the SS police force participating in the massacre at the Ardeatine caves
- December 4 – Alessandro Fontana, academic and politician

== See also ==
- 2013 in Italian television
- List of Italian films of 2013
