= Hospitality Suite (play) =

Play written by Roger Rueff

Hospitality Suite is a 1992 stage play written by Roger Rueff that centers on conflicting notions of character, salesmanship, honesty, religion, and love that simmer until they boil over as two experienced salesmen and a young research engineer await a CEO whose visit to their modest hospitality suite could save their company from ruin.

== Plot summary ==
In a small hotel room of the Holiday Inn in downtown Wichita, Kansas, three representatives of an industrial lubricants firm prepare to host a convention hospitality suite. Phil is a recently divorced account manager in his mid-50s who's begun to question his purpose in life and work. Larry is an established salesman, about 40 and energetic. Bob is a young engineer from the company research department, recently married, affable, inquisitive, and religious. Larry and Phil hope to make the acquaintance of Dick Fuller, CEO of one of the largest manufacturing firms in the Midwest and, as such, a potential savior of their ailing company. They have invited him, but never met or seen him. As the three prepare the room, they discuss religion, where the stark differences between Larry and Bob introduce tension.

Late that night, when the last of the partygoers have left, Phil and Larry are desolate because Dick Fuller didn't show. Larry had even left the room to search for him earlier in the night but was unable to hunt him down. All seems truly lost until they realize that Dick Fuller did show up and that Bob unwittingly talked to him at length about a lot of issues unrelated to industrial lubricants, including religion—a fact that accentuates the battle lines and brings Larry's blood to a low boil. Bob is sent on a mission to find Dick Fuller at another party down the street and relay Larry and Phil's desire to speak to him about lubricants. As Phil and Larry wait for Bob, the questions bugging Phil about life and purpose make themselves known—cutting through the veneer of their relationship and exposing both to their true feelings about each other. When Bob returns and reveals that he found Dick Fuller but that he could only bring himself to talk to him about Jesus, the gloves come off, and no one is left unscathed.

== Reception ==
The play received critical reviews. Reviewers praised some of the one-liners and comedy, and especially appreciated how well the set design evoked a bland business hotel. However, they found the characters and attempted philosophical discussions too shallow.

== Film adaptation ==
Director John Swanbeck created a 1999 motion picture version of the play titled The Big Kahuna. Roger Rueff wrote the screenplay with Kevin Spacey (Larry), Danny DeVito (Phil) and Peter Facinelli (Bob) starring in the lead roles.
