= The Man Without Gravity =

2019 Italian film

- Film poster
- Italian: L'uomo senza gravità
- Directed by: Marco Bonfanti
- Written by: Marco Bonfanti; Fabrizio Bozzetti
- Starring: Elio Germano; Michela Cescon; Elena Cotta; Silvia D'Amico
- Cinematography: Michele D'Attanasio
- Edited by: Giogiò Franchini
- Production company: Netflix
- Distributed by: Netflix
- Release date: November 1, 2019 (Italy)
- Countries: Italy, Belgium, France
- Language: Italian

The Man Without Gravity (Italian: L'uomo senza gravità) is a 2019 Italian fantasy drama film Directed by Marco Bonfanti, written by Marco Bonfanti and Fabrizio Bozzetti and starring Elio Germano, Michela Cescon and Elena Cotta, the film was released on November 1, 2019 on Netflix.

== Plot ==
The plot of the film revolves around the child Oscar (Elio Germano) who, when being born, flies away lighter than a balloon.

Oscar comes to light on a stormy night, in the hospital of a small town, and immediately we understand that there is something extraordinary about him : he does not obey the law of gravity. He floats in the air, hovers in the lightest breeze like a balloon, in front of the incredulous look of the mother and grandmother. The child grows closely protected and sheltered - with only one friend, a little girl called Agata who knows his secret. When nosy neighbours cause the police to step in and request that Oscar be sent to school with all the other children, the two women decide to move to a remote village to keep him safe. Surrounded by books, Oscar grows up in this little village until the day he decides that the whole world must know who he really is. He is "The Man without Gravity" .

== Cast ==
- Elio Germano as Oscar
- Michela Cescon as Natalia
- Elena Cotta as Alina
- Silvia D'Amico as Agata
- Vincent Scarito as David
- Pietro Pescara as Young Oscar
- Jennifer Brokshi as Young Agata
- Andrea Pennacchi as Andrea
- Cristina Donadio as Lucy
- Dieter-Michael Grohmann as Lukas
- Dominique Lombardo as Piero
- Francesco Procopio as Marshal
- Salvio Simeoli as TV Presenter
- Agnieszka Jania as Vlady
- Balkissa Souley Maiga as Sissy

== Release ==
The Man Without Gravity was released on November 1, 2019 on Netflix.
