= Pietro Bartolo =

Italian politician (born 1956)

Pietro Bartolo OMRI MEP
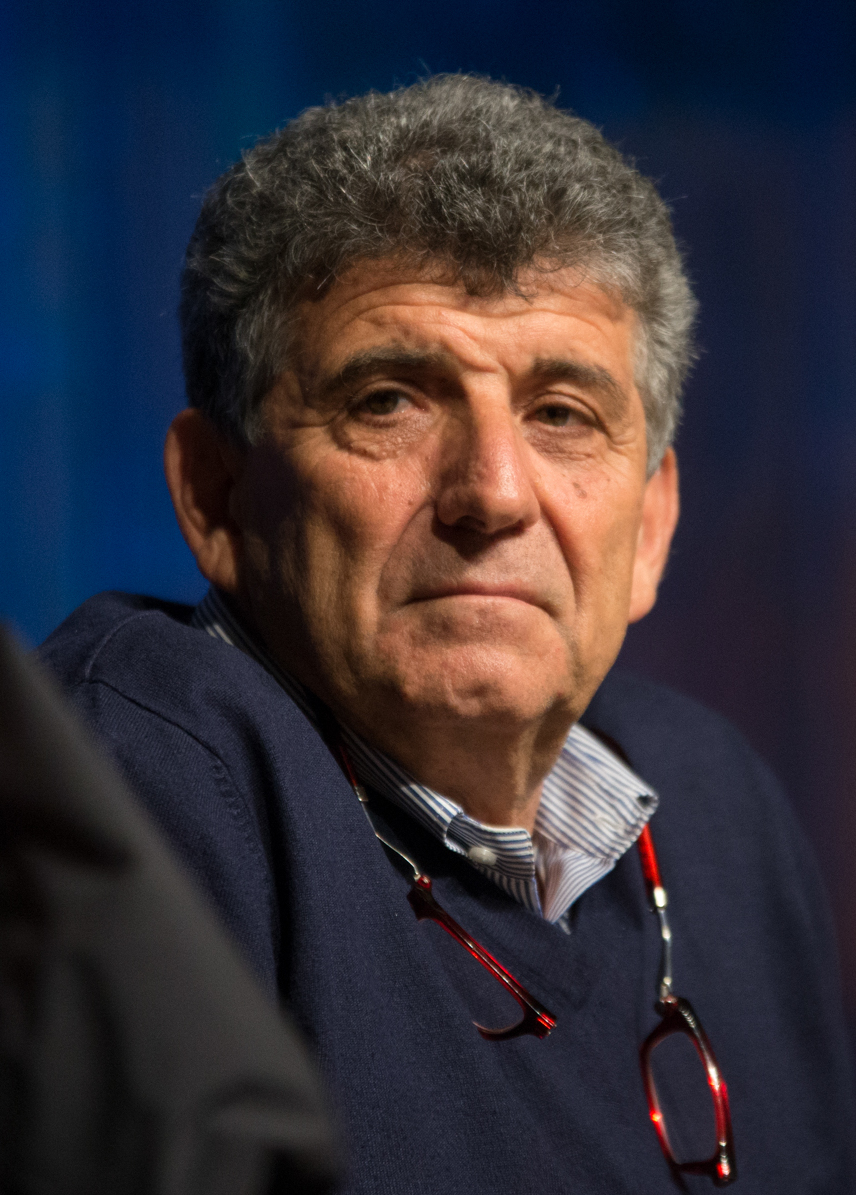
- Bartolo in 2017

Member of the European Parliament for Italian Islands
- In office 2 July 2019 – 15 July 2024

Personal details
- Born: 10 February 1956 (age 70) Lampedusa e Linosa, Italy
- Party: DemoS (2019–2023); PD (since 2023)
- Education: University of Catania
- Profession: Medical Director
- Website: www.pietrobartolo.eu

Pietro Bartolo, OMRI, MEP (born 10 February 1956), is an Italian doctor and politician. From 1992 to 2019, he was known as the responsible medician for first visits to migrants who landed in Lampedusa; in 25 years, he examined and cared for about 250,000 refugees on the island. In 2019, Bartolo was elected as a member of the European Parliament for the Democratic Party.

== Early life and education ==
Bartolo was born in Lampedusa e Linosa. A medical surgeon who graduated from the University of Catania, he specialized in gynecology. In 1988, he was appointed head of the medical cabinet of the Italian Air Force in Lampedusa. In 1991, he was health officer of the Pelagian Islands. In 1993, he became responsible for the health service and the outpatient clinic of Lampedusa, under the control of the Health District of Palermo.

== Political career ==
=== Career in local politics ===
Bartolo was a town councillor in the municipality of Lampedusa e Linosa from 1988 to 2007, and was vice mayor and health councillor of the municipality of Pelagie from 1988 to 1993. Since 1992, he has also been taking care of the first visits to all the migrants who land in Lampedusa from Africa and those who stay in the reception centre. In March 2011 he was appointed coordinator of all health activities in the Pelagian Islands by the then Health Councillor of the Sicilian Region Massimo Russo. Despite having been hit by a cerebral ischaemia a few weeks earlier, he was in the front row in rescuing the survivors of the 2013 Lampedusa migrant shipwreck; it involved a fishing boat carrying over 500 migrants, in which 368 people lost their lives.

Bartolo took part in the documentary film Fire at Sea (Fuocoammare) by Gianfranco Rosi, which in February 2016 won the Golden Bear at the 66th Berlin International Film Festival and nominated for the Academy Award for Best Documentary Feature at the 89th Academy Awards. A supporter of the reception of immigrants and asylum seekers and of the need for humanitarian corridors against human trafficking, he took part as a guest in several Italian television programmes. In July 2019, having placed himself on leave for the parliamentary term, he was replaced at the head of the outpatient clinic in Lampedusa by former MP Francesco Cascio.

In the 2018 Italian general election, the left-wing electorali list Free and Equal announced his candidacy in the Senate of the Republic; in the end, Bartolo renounced it. He joined Solidary Democracy in February 2019.

=== Member of the European Parliament, 2019–present ===
In the 2019 European Parliament election in Italy, Bartolo stood for election to the lists of the Democratic Party for the island and central Italian constituencies, being elected in both constituencies and reaching first place (with 135,098 votes, plus 808 votes from abroad) and second place (with 139,158 votes, plus 895 votes from abroad), respectively.

Bartolo opted for the island district and took office in the European Parliament on 2 July 2019. In Parliament, Bartolo joined the Group of the Progressive Alliance of Socialists and Democrats (S&D). He is vice-chairman of the European Parliament Committee on Civil Liberties, Justice and Home Affairs (LIBE) and member of the European Parliament Committee on Fisheries (PECH). In addition to his committee assignments, Bartolo is part of the Parliament's delegation to the ACP–EU Joint Parliamentary Assembly. He is also a member of the European Parliament Intergroup on Cancer, the European Parliament Intergroup on Fighting against Poverty, the European Parliament Intergroup on Western Sahara, and the Spinelli Group. Bartolo voted against the European Parliament resolution of 23 November 2022 on recognising the Russian Federation as a state sponsor of terrorism, believing that the choice would prevent a diplomatic solution to the conflict.

== Personal life ==
Bartolo is married and has three children.

== Works ==
- Bartolo, Pietro; Lidia Tilotta (2016). Lacrime di sale. La mia storia quotidiana di medico di Lampedusa fra dolore e speranza [Salt tears. My daily story as a doctor from Lampedusa between pain and hope]. Milan: Mondadori. ISBN 978-88-04-66973-9.
- Bartolo, Pietro (2018). Le stelle di Lampedusa. La storia di Anila e di altri bambini che cercano il loro futuro fra noi [The stars of Lampedusa. The story of Anila and other children looking for their future among us]. Milan: Mondadori. ISBN 978-88-04-70527-7.

== See also ==
- Fire at Sea
- Lampedusa immigrant reception center
