= A Fuller Life =

2023 French documentary film

- Directed by: Samantha Fuller
- Written by: Samantha Fuller
- Produced by: Gillian Wallace; Samantha Fuller
- Edited by: Tyler Purcell
- Music by: Paul-Alexander Fuller
- Release date: 1 September 2013 (Venice)

A Fuller Life is a 2013 American documentary film co-written and directed by Samantha Fuller. It premiered out of competition at the 70th edition of the Venice Film Festival.

== Production ==
The film was conceived by Samantha Fuller, Samuel Fuller's only child, in 2011, as to celebrate her father's centenary. It is based on Samuel Fuller's autobiography A Third Face, from which several excerpts are read throughout the film. It also features excerpts from Fuller's private 16mm films.

The film was financed through a Kickstarter campaign and some anonymous donors. It features, among others, Wim Wenders, William Friedkin, Joe Dante, James Franco, Buck Henry, Mark Hamill, Tim Roth, James Toback, Monte Hellman, Jennifer Beals, Robert Carradine, Constance Towers, Bill Duke, Kelly Ward, and Perry Lang.

== Release ==
The film had its world premiere at the 70th Venice International Film Festival, in the Venice Classics sidebar.

== Reception ==
On the review aggregator website Rotten Tomatoes, 90% of 21 critics' reviews are positive, with an average rating of 7.00/10.
