= In Viaggio: The Travels of Pope Francis =

- Directed by: Gianfranco Rosi
- Starring: Pope Francis
- Cinematography: Gianfranco Rosi
- Edited by: Fabrizio Federico
- Distributed by: Magnolia Pictures (U.S.)
- Release date: 2022
- Country: Italy
- Box office: $23,142

In Viaggio: The Travels of Pope Francis (Italian: In Viaggio, lit. 'Travelling') is a 2022 Italian documentary film written and directed by Gianfranco Rosi. A chronicle of the international visits of Pope Francis, it premiered out of competition at the 79th edition of the Venice Film Festival.

== Plot ==
The film chronicles, through archive footage, the 37 international papal visits in 53 countries, trying to capture his messages as well as his personality, including "moments and images of apparent emotional vulnerability and exhaustion".

== Release ==
The film had its world premiere at the 79th Venice International Film Festival, in which it was screened out of competition. It was released theatrically in Italy on October 4, 2022. Magnolia Pictures announced its U.S. theatrical release on March 31, 2023.

== Reception ==
On Rotten Tomatoes, the film has an 81% approval rating based on 21 reviews.

Deadline film critic Anna Smith described the film as "a powerful meditation on recent history" and "a moving reflection on the world’s trials, and a tribute to those who seek to change them". According to Variety critic Guy Lodge, it is a film which "pull off a neat duality of perspective, allowing both faithful Catholic devotees and papal skeptics to see what they will in his measured actions and diplomatic statements of spiritual principle and occasional anguish".
