= Amazonia (film) =

2013 film

- Promotional release poster
- Directed by: Thierry Ragobert
- Written by: Johanne Bernard; Luiz Bolognesi; Louis-Paul Desanges; Luc Marescot; Thierry Ragobert
- Produced by: Stéphane Millière; Laurent Baujard; Debora Ivanov; Gabriel Lacerda; Caio Gullane; Fabiano Gullane
- Cinematography: Gustavo Hadba; Manuel Teran; Jérôme Bouvier
- Edited by: Nadine Verdier
- Music by: Bruno Coulais
- Production companies: Le Pacte; Biloba Films; Gullane; France 2 Cinéma; Gedeon Programmes; Imovision; Globo Filmes; Canal+ France Télévisions; Riofilme; Telecine
- Release dates: 7 September 2013 (Venice); 27 November 2013 (France); 26 June 2014 (Brazil)
- Running time: 90 minutes
- Countries: Brazil; France
- Language: Portuguese
- Budget: R$26 million

Amazonia (Portuguese: Amazônia) is a 2013 Brazilian-French adventure drama film co-written and directed by Thierry Ragobert. The main character of the film is Sai (Castanha in the Brazilian version), a young capuchin monkey raised in captivity. After a plane crash strands him in the Amazon rainforest, he must find his way amongst the beauty and danger that exists within the Amazon.

Though the film's narration lends it the feel of documentary, the story of Sai's struggle is fictionalized. The filmmakers used former pet monkeys from a Brazilian sanctuary to shoot the scenes involving capuchins. The English version is narrated by Martin Sheen.

Amazonia was screened out of competition at the 70th Venice International Film Festival and closed the festival.
