= The Big Kahuna (film) =

1999 film

- Theatrical release poster
- Directed by: John Swanbeck
- Screenplay by: Roger Rueff
- Based on: Hospitalite Suite by Roger Rueff
- Produced by: Elie Samaha; Kevin Spacey; Andrew Stevens
- Starring: Kevin Spacey; Danny DeVito; Peter Facinelli
- Cinematography: Anastas N. Michos
- Edited by: Peggy Davis
- Music by: Christopher Young
- Production companies: Franchise Pictures; Trigger Street Productions
- Distributed by: Lionsgate Films
- Release dates: September 16, 1999 (TIFF); April 28, 2000 (limited)
- Running time: 90 minutes
- Country: United States
- Language: English
- Budget: $7 million
- Box office: $3.7 million

The Big Kahuna is a 1999 American business comedy-drama film directed by John Swanbeck, and produced by Kevin Spacey, who also starred in the lead role. The film is adapted from the 1992 play Hospitality Suite, written by Roger Rueff, who also wrote the screenplay. John Swanbeck makes few attempts to lessen this film's resemblance to a stage performance: the majority of the film takes place in a single hotel room, and nearly every single line of dialogue is spoken by one of the three actors. The famous 1997 essay Wear Sunscreen is featured at the end of the film.

== Plot ==
Larry Mann and Phil Cooper, two experienced marketing representatives for an industrial lubricants company, attend a trade convention in Wichita, Kansas, in the American Midwest. They are joined in their hospitality suite by Bob Walker, a young man from the company's research department. Larry and Phil are close friends with a long history together. Larry faces urgent financial difficulties that he alludes to only obliquely; Phil has recently come through a recovery program for alcoholism. Bob, an earnest young Baptist, has few if any regrets. Larry explains that their single goal is to arrange a meeting with Dick Fuller, the CEO of a large company ("the Big Kahuna").

While the three wait in their suite for the convention downstairs to finish, Larry and Phil explain to Bob how to develop and discern character. They also make Bob the bartender for the evening even though he drinks infrequently. Larry remarks that as he has quit smoking, Phil has quit drinking and Bob is religious, it makes them "practically Jesus".

Even though he makes a poor bartender, Bob spends the evening talking to people. In doing so, he inadvertently chats with the Big Kahuna, who invites him over to a private party at another hotel. Larry and Phil excitedly coach Bob through their pitch on industrial lubricants down to an amount of information Bob can handle and supply him with their business cards.

As the pair wait for Bob, they reflect on the nature of human life. However, Bob returns to drop a bombshell: he used the time to discuss religion rather than pitch the company's product. Larry, dumbfounded, challenges Bob and leaves the room devastated. Phil explains to Bob that proselytizing is just another kind of sales pitch. He explains that making real human-to-human contact requires honesty and a genuine interest in other people. Phil gives his reason why he and Larry have a friendship: trust. He then tells Bob that until he can recognize what he should regret, he will not grow in character.

The next morning Phil packs his things. As Larry checks out, he sees Bob talking again to the "Big Kahuna" in the lobby. They exchange a knowing smile as Bob appears to continue to push his own agenda of preaching God instead of selling lubricants. The soundtrack during the credits is "Everybody's Free (to Wear Sunscreen)", a setting of an essay by Mary Schmich.

== Cast ==
- Kevin Spacey as Larry Mann
- Danny DeVito as Phil Cooper
- Peter Facinelli as Bob Walker
- Paul Dawson as Bellboy
- Jen Taylor (uncredited) as Mrs. Johnson

== Release ==
The Big Kahuna was released on April 28, 2000 by Lionsgate Films.

=== Home media ===
The film was released on VHS and DVD by Universal Pictures Home Entertainment on August 29, 2000.

== Reception ==
The Big Kahuna garnered a generally positive critical reception while earning modest returns at the box office.

On review aggregator Rotten Tomatoes, 73% of 79 critics gave the film a positive review. The site's consensus reads: "Wonderful adaptation of the stage play." On Metacritic the film has a score of 56 based on reviews from 27 critics, indicating "mixed or average reviews".

Roger Ebert of the Chicago Sun-Times called it "sharp-edged, perfectly timed, funny and thoughtful."
