= Fire at Sea =

2016 film

- Theatrical release poster
- Directed by: Gianfranco Rosi
- Written by: Gianfranco Rosi
- Produced by: Gianfranco Rosi; Paolo Del Brocco; Donatella Palermo
- Cinematography: Gianfranco Rosi
- Edited by: Jacopo Quadri
- Music by: Stefano Grosso
- Production companies: 21Uno Film; Stemal Entertainment; Istituto Luce Cinecittà; Rai Cinema; Les Films d'Ici; Arte France Cinéma
- Distributed by: 01 Distribution
- Release dates: 13 February 2016 (Berlinale); 18 February 2016 (Italy)
- Running time: 114 minutes
- Countries: Italy; France
- Language: Italian
- Box office: $1 million

Fire at Sea (Italian: Fuocoammare) is a 2016 documentary film written and directed by Gianfranco Rosi. Filmed for almost a year in the Italian island of Lampedusa, it follows the 2015 European migrant crisis through the eyes of the people of the island.

The film had its world premiere in the main competition of the 66th Berlin International Film Festival on 13 February 2016, where it won the Golden Bear. It was selected as the Italian entry for the Best Foreign Language Film at the 89th Academy Awards, but it was not nominated in that category, it was instead nominated for Best Documentary Feature.

== Overview ==
The film was shot on the Sicilian island of Lampedusa during the European migrant crisis, and sets the migrants' dangerous Mediterranean crossing against a background of the ordinary life of the islanders. The main characters are a twelve-year-old boy from a local fishing family and a doctor who treats the migrants on their arrival. In his acceptance speech for the Golden Bear award, Rosi stated that his intention was to heighten awareness of the migrant situation, saying, "It's not acceptable that people die crossing the sea to escape from tragedies."

== Synopsis ==
A young boy, Samuele Pucillo, cuts a forked twig from a pine tree to make a slingshot. With his friend Mattias Cucina, he then enjoys carving eyes and mouth on some shovels of prickly pear and throwing stones with the slingshot, as if against an enemy army. This happens on the island of Lampedusa, while the men of the Italian Navy's district office, received by radio a request for help, activate the search at sea with naval units and helicopters of the Coast Guard. Meanwhile, life on the island continues. A housewife, Maria Signorello, while preparing lunch, listens to the local radio station led by Pippo Fragapane who broadcasts music and songs on request and gives news about sightings and rescues at sea.

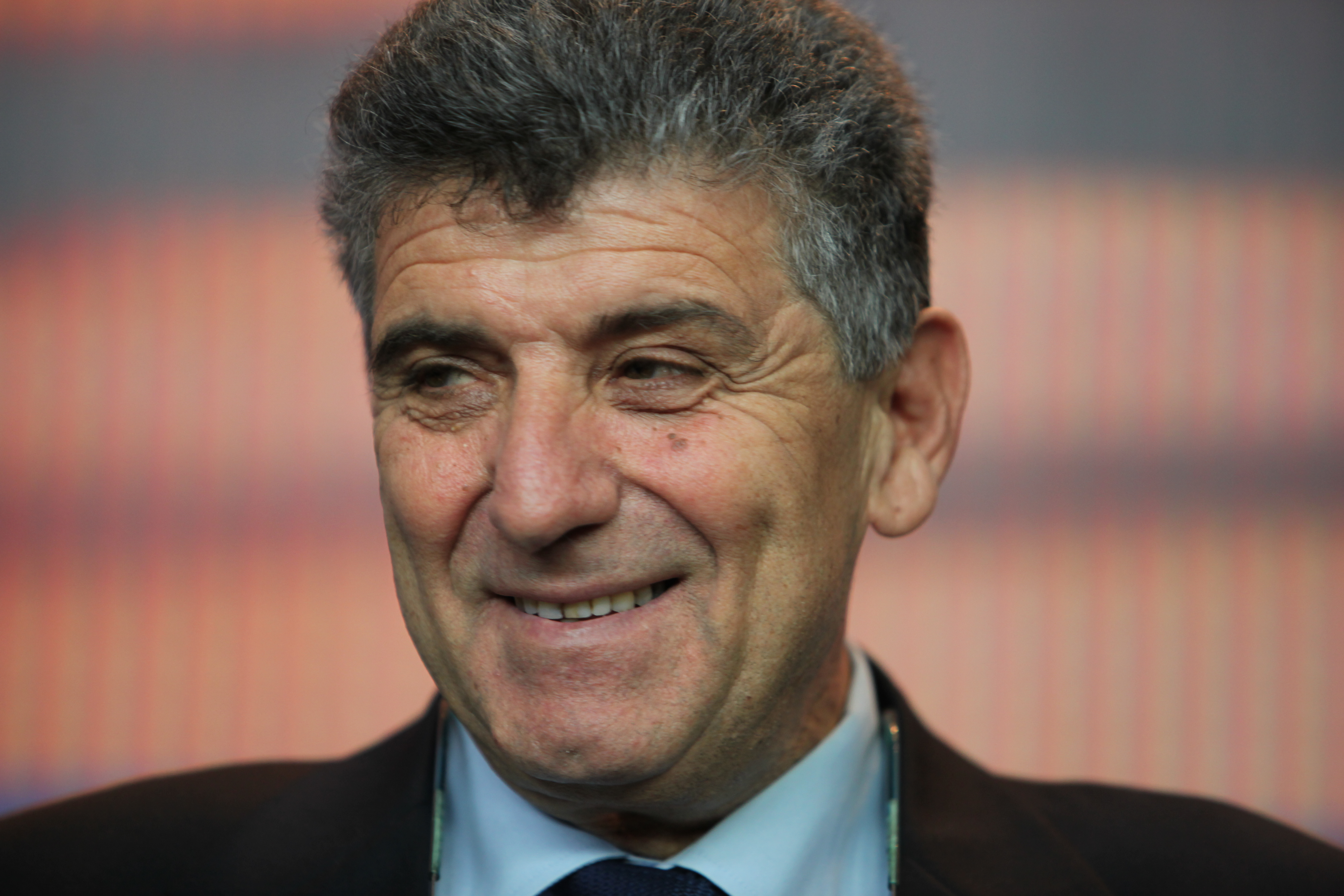
Dr. Pietro Bartolo

Refugees and migrants from North Africa on overcrowded boats are taken on board Coast Guard ships and then, transhipped on spears and patrol boats, are taken ashore. Here they find Pietro Bartolo, the doctor who directs the outpatient clinic in Lampedusa and who for years has been making his first visit to every migrant who disembarks on the island. They are then transferred by bus to the Lampedusa immigrant reception center, searched and photographed. Samuele talks to Francesco Mannino, a relative fisherman who tells him about when he was a sailor on merchant ships living always on board for six, seven months, between sky and sea. A diver, Francesco Paterna, dives to fish for sea urchins despite the rough sea.

At home, during a thunderstorm, Samuel studies and then listens to his grandmother, Maria Costa, who tells him about when, during the Second World War, at night the military ships passed throwing light rockets into the air and the sea turned red, it seemed there was "fire at sea". Maria Signorello calls the radio to dedicate a cheerful swing Fuocoammare to her fisherman son, wishing the bad weather will end soon so that he can go out on the boat to work. Meanwhile, while the song is on the air, a group of refugees in the immigrant reception centre sing a heartfelt song accompanied by the story of their vicissitudes.

Dr. Bartolo, showing the photo of a boat with 860 people, tells of those who have not made it. Especially those who sail below deck for days, tired, hungry, dehydrated, soaked and burned by fuel. Moved and upset, the doctor tells of how many he could treat and how many, however, had to inspect the bodies recovered at sea, including many women and children, making it very difficult to get used to. So, while Samuele grows up and faces his difficulties to become a sailor, the tragedy of migrants and the commitment of rescuers continues at sea.

== Reception ==
=== Critical response ===
The film has a 95% rating from Rotten Tomatoes, based on 95 reviews with an average rating of 7.8 out of 10. The website's critical consensus states, "Fire at Sea offers a clear-eyed yet empathetic look at a corner of the world whose terrain may be unfamiliar to many, but whose people's story remains universal". It also has a score of 87 out of 100 on Metacritic, based on 20 critics, indicating "universal acclaim".

Meryl Streep, chair of the Berlin jury, called the film "a daring hybrid of captured footage and deliberate storytelling that allows us to consider what documentary can do. It is urgent, imaginative and necessary filmmaking." Andrew Pulver, writing for The Guardian, described the documentary as having "a distinctive, humane cinematic style" and being "a collection of tiny details that morph, almost by osmosis, into a shocking excavation of the mechanics of crisis." He praises it for approaching the tragedy indirectly, via the people of Lampedusa. The film was also appreciated by the Italian Prime Minister Matteo Renzi, who stated that he would carry with him 27 DVDs of the film to a session of the European Council. Each one of the copies was given to a head of state or government of the European Union.

The Economist thought it had "beautiful cinematography and searing images, but also odd choices and murky priorities" and took issue with the film's lack of relation between the refugee crisis and the impact it had on the lives of the islanders interviewed.

In 2019, The Guardian ranked Fire at Sea in 53rd place in its 100 best films of the 21st century list.

== See also ==
- List of submissions to the 89th Academy Awards for Best Foreign Language Film
- List of Italian submissions for the Academy Award for Best Foreign Language Film
