= 70th Venice International Film Festival =

Italian film festival in 2013

- Festival poster
- Opening film: Gravity
- Closing film: Amazonia
- Location: Venice, Italy
- Founded: 1932
- Awards: Golden Lion: Sacro GRA
- Hosted by: Eva Riccobono
- Artistic director: Alberto Barbera
- Festival date: 28 August – 7 September 2013
- Website: www.labiennale.org/en/cinema/

Venice Film Festival chronology
- 71st 69th

The 70th annual Venice International Film Festival, was held from 28 August to 7 September 2013, at Venice Lido in Italy.

Italian filmmaker Bernardo Bertolucci was the jury president for the main competition. He was previously the president of the jury at the 40th edition in 1983. Italian actress Eva Riccobono hosted the opening and closing nights of the festival.

The Golden Lion was awarded to Sacro GRA by Gianfranco Rosi, marking the first documentary film to ever win it.

American filmmaker William Friedkin received the Golden Lion for Lifetime Achievement during the festival.

The festival opened with Gravity by Alfonso Cuarón, and closed with Amazonia by Thierry Ragobert.

== Juries ==
=== Main competition (Venezia 70) ===
- Bernardo Bertolucci, Italian filmmaker - Jury President
- Andrea Arnold, English filmmaker
- Renato Berta, Swiss-France director of photography
- Carrie Fisher, American actress, screenwriter and novelist
- Martina Gedeck, German actress
- Jiang Wen, Chinese actor and director
- Pablo Larraín, Chilean filmmaker
- Virginie Ledoyen, French actress
- Ryuichi Sakamoto, Japanese composer

=== Orizzonti ===
- Paul Schrader, American screenwriter, film director and critic - Jury President
- Catherine Corsini, French filmmaker, screenwriter and actress
- Leonardo Di Costanzo, Italian director, screenwriter and cinematographer
- Golshifteh Farahani, Iranian actress, musician and singer
- Frédéric Fonteyne, Belgian film director
- Kseniya Rappoport, Russian actress
- Amr Waked, Egyptian actor

=== Opera Prima (Venice Award for a Debut Film) ===
- Haifaa Al Mansour, Saudi Arabian filmmaker - Jury President
- Amat Escalante, Mexican filmmaker, producer
- Alexej German Jr., Russian filmmaker
- Geoffrey Gilmore, director of Tribeca Film Festival
- Ariane Labed, Greek-French actress
- Maria Sole Tognazzi, Italian film director

== Official Sections ==
=== In Competition ===
The following films were selected for the main competition:

English title	Original title	Director(s)	Production country
Ana Arabia		Amos Gitai	Israel, France
Child of God		James Franco	United States
L'intrepido		Gianni Amelio	Italy
Jealousy	La Jalousie	Philippe Garrel	France
Joe		David Gordon Green	United States
Miss Violence		Alexandros Avranas	Greece
Night Moves		Kelly Reichardt	United States
Parkland		Peter Landesman	United States
Philomena		Stephen Frears	United Kingdom
The Police Officer's Wife	Die Frau des Polizisten	Philip Gröning	Germany
The Rooftops	لسطوح	Merzak Allouache	Algeria, France
Sacro GRA		Gianfranco Rosi	Italy
Stray Dogs	郊遊	Tsai Ming-liang	Taiwan, France
A Street in Palermo	Via Castellana Bandiera	Emma Dante	Italy, Switzerland, France
Tom at the Farm	Tom à la ferme	Xavier Dolan	Canada, France
Tracks		John Curran	United Kingdom, Australia
Under the Skin		Jonathan Glazer	United Kingdom, United States
The Unknown Known		Errol Morris	United States
The Wind Rises	風立ちぬ	Hayao Miyazaki	Japan
The Zero Theorem		Terry Gilliam	United Kingdom, United States

=== Out of Competition ===
The following films were selected for the out of competition section:

English title	Original title	Director(s)	Production country
Amazonia (closing film)		Thierry Ragobert	France, Brazil
The Canyons		Paul Schrader	United States
Con il fiato sospeso		Costanza Quatriglio	Italy
Disney Mickey Mouse - O' Sole Minnie (season 1, episode 12)		Paul Rudish, Aaron Springer, Clay Morrow	United States
Gravity (opening film)		Alfonso Cuarón	United States
Home from Home	Die andere Heimat — Chronik einer Sehnsucht	Edgar Reitz	Germany
Locke		Steven Knight	United Kingdom
Moebius	뫼비우스	Kim Ki-duk	South Korea
A Promise	Une promesse	Patrice Leconte	France
Redemption		Miguel Gomes	Portugal, France, Germany, Italy
Harlock: Space Pirate	宇宙海賊キャプテンハーロック	Aramaki Shinji	Japan
Unforgiven	許されざる者	Lee Sang-Il	Japan
Walesa: Man of Hope	Wałęsa. Człowiek z nadziei	Andrzej Wajda	Poland
Wolf Creek 2		Greg McLean	Australia
Non Fiction
The Armstrong Lie		Alex Gibney	United States
At Berkeley		Frederick Wiseman	United States
How Strange to Be Named Federico	Che strano chiamarsi Federico - Scola racconta Fellini	Ettore Scola	Italy
Pine Ridge		Anna Eborn	Denmark
Summer 82 When Zappa Came to Sicily		Salvo Cuccia	Italy, United States
'Til Madness Do Us Part	瘋愛	Wang Bing	Hong Kong, France
Ukraine Is Not a Brothel	Ukraina ne Bordel	Kitty Green	Australia
The Voice of Berliguer	La voce di Berlinguer	Mario Sesti, Teho Teardo	Italy

=== Horizons (Orizzonti) ===
The following films were selected for the Horizons (Orizzonti) section:

English title	Original title	Director(s)	Production country
Feature films
Eastern Boys		Robin Campillo	France
First Snowfall	La prima neve	Andrea Segre	Italy
Fish & Cat	Mahi Va Gorbeh	Shahram Mokri	Iran
The Life After	La vida después	David Pablos	Mexico
Little Brother	Bauyr	Serik Aprymov	Kazakhstan
Medeas		Andrea Pallaoro	United States, Italy
My Name Is Hmmm...	Je m'appelle Hmmm...	Agnès B.	France
Palo Alto		Gia Coppola	United States
Ruin		Amiel Courtin-Wilson, Michael Cody	Australia
The Sacrament		Ti West	United States
Small Homeland	Piccola patria	Alessandro Rossetto	Italy
Some Girls	Algunas chicas	Santiago Palavecino	Argentina
Still Life		Uberto Pasolini	United Kingdom, Italy
The Third Half	Il terzo tempo	Enrico Maria Artale	Italy
We Are the Best!	Vi Är Bäst!	Lukas Moodysson	Sweden, Denmark
Why Don't You Play in Hell?	Jigoku de naze warui	Sion Sono	Japan
Wolf Children	Wolfskinder	Rick Ostermann	Germany
Short Films Competition
Aningaaq		Jonas Cuarón	United States
The Audition		Michael Haussman	Italy
Ballkoni		Lendita Zeqiraj	Kosovo
Blanco		Ignacio Gatica	Argentina
Cold Snap		Leo Woodhead	New Zealand
Death For a Unicorn		Riccardo Bernasconi, Francesca Reverdito	Switzerland
La gallina		Manel Raga	Spain
Houses With Small Windows		Bülent Öztürk	Belgium
Kush		Shubhashish Bhutiani	India
Minesh		Shalin Sirkar	South Africa, Germany, Denmark
Un pensiero Kalašnikov		Giorgio Bosisio	Italy, United Kingdom
Quello Che Resta		Valeria Allievi	Italy
Sishui (Stagnant Water)		Xiaowei Wang	China
Toutes les belles choses		Cécile Bicler	France

=== Venice Classics ===
The following selection of restored classic films and documentaries on cinema were screened for this section:

English title	Original title	Director(s)	Production country
Restored Films
Le 15/8 (1973)		Chantal Akerman, Samy Szlingerbaum	Belgium
The Adventures of Hajji Baba (1954)		Don Weis	United States
Il Bacio di Tosca (aka Tosca's Kiss) (1984)		Daniel Schmid	Switzerland
La Bête humaine (aka The Human Beast) (1938)		Jean Renoir	France
Bread and Chocolate (1974)	Pane e cioccolata	Franco Brusati	Italy
A Bullet For The General (1966)	Quién Sabe?	Damiano Damiani	Italy
Comrades: Almost a Love Story (1996)	甜蜜蜜	Peter Ho-Sun Chan	Hong Kong
Do You Remember Dolly Bell? (1981)	Сјећаш ли се Доли Бел?	Emir Kusturica	Yugoslavia
Equinox Flower (1958)	彼岸花	Yasujirō Ozu	Japan
Hands Over the City (1963)	Le mani sulla città	Francesco Rosi	Italy, France
Hotel Monterey (1972)		Chantal Akerman	Belgium, United States
In the Heat of the Sun (1993)	陽光燦爛的日子	Jiang Wen	China, Hong Kong
Kapurush (1965)	কাপুরুষ	Satyajit Ray	India
Let's Get Lost (1988)		Bruce Weber	United States
Little Fugitive (1953)		Morris Engel, Ruth Orkin, Ray Ashley	United States
Mahapurush (1965)		Satyajit Ray	India
Merry Christmas, Mr. Lawrence (1983)	戦場のメリークリスマス	Nagisa Ôshima	United Kingdom, Japan
The Most Dangerous Game (1932)		Irving Pichel, Ernest B. Schoedsack	United States
My Darling Clementine (1946)		John Ford	United States
My Friend Ivan Lapshin (1984)	Мой друг Иван Лапшин	Aleksey German Sr.	Soviet Union
Mysterious Object at Noon (2000)	ดอกฟ้าในมือมาร	Apichatpong Weerasethakul	Thailand
Nidhanaya (1970)		Lester James Peries	Sri Lanka
Paisan (1946)	Paisà	Roberto Rossellini	Italy
Property Is No Longer a Theft (1973)	La proprietà non è più un furto	Elio Petri	Italy
Providence (1977)		Alain Resnais	France, Switzerland, United Kingdom
Sandra (1965)	Vaghe stelle dell'orsa...	Luchino Visconti	Italy
The Shape of Night (1964)	夜の片鱗	Noboru Nakamura	Japan
Sorcerer (1977)		William Friedkin	United States
White Rock (1977)		Tony Maylam	United Kingdom
Documentaries about cinema
Il Bacio di Tosca, Une restauration numérique		Richard Szotyori	Switzerland
Bertolucci on Bertolucci		Luca Guadagnino, Walter Fasano	Italy
Double Play: James Benning and Richard Linklater		Gabe Klinger	United States, Portugal, France
A Fuller Life		Samantha Fuller	United States
Istintobrass		Massimiliano Zanin	Italy
Lino Micciché, Mio padre. Una visione del mondo		Francesco Micciché	Italy
Nice Girls Don't Stay for Breakfast		Bruce Weber	United States
Non Eravamo Solo... Ladri Di Biciclette. Il Neorealismo		Gianni Bozzacchi	Italy
Trespassing Bergman		Jane Magnusson, Hynek Pallas	Sweden, France

=== Biennale College - Cinema ===
The following films were screened for the "Biennale College - Cinema" section, a higher education training workshop for micro-budget feature films:

English title	Original title	Director(s)	Production country
Yuri Esposito		Alessio Fava	Italy
Memphis		Tim Sutton	United States
Mary Is Happy, Mary Is Happy		Nawapol Thamrongrattanarit	Thailand

=== Final Cut in Venice ===
The following films were screened for the "Final Cut in Venice" section, a workshop to support the post-production of films from Africa:

English title	Original title	Director(s)	Production country
Challatt Tunes	Le Challat de Tunis	Kaouther Ben Hania	Tunisia
The Cat	El Ott	Ibrahim El-Batout	Egypt
With Almost Nothing	Avec presque rien...	Nantenaina Lova	Madagascar
Territorial Pissings		Sibs Shongwe-La Mer	South Africa

=== Special Screenings ===
The following films were the Special Screenings of the Official Selection:

- Dietro le quinte di otto e 1/2 by Gideon Bachmann (Italy)
- Dai Nostri Inviati – La RAI racconta la mostra del cinema di Venezia 1980-1989 by Enrico Salvatori, Giuseppe Giannotti, Davide Savelli (Italy)

== Venice 70 - Future Reloaded ==
Under the project title Venice 70 - Future Reloaded, 70 top film directors were each invited to make a 60-90 second short film, as "both a collective tribute to the Festival (the first festival in the world to reach the milestone of 70 editions) and a reflection on the future of cinema".

== Independent Sections ==
=== Venice International Film Critics' Week ===
The following films were selected for the Critics' Week:

English title	Original title	Director(s)	Production country
In competition
Salvation Army	L’armée du salut	Abdellah Taïa	France, Morocco
The Reunion	Återträffen	Anna Odell	Sweden
The Quispe Girls	Las niñas Quispe	Sebastián Sepúlveda	Chile, France, Argentina
Class Enemy	Razredni Sovražnik	Rok Biček	Slovenia
White Shadow		Noaz Deshe	Italy, Germany, Tanzania
Zoran, My Nephew the Idiot	Zoran, il mio nipote scemo	Matteo Oleotto	Italy, Slovenia
Trap Street	Shuiyin jie	Vivian Qu	China
Special Events - Out of competition
The Art of Happiness (opening film)	L’arte della felicità	Alessandro Rak	Italy
Illiterate (closing film)	Las analfabetas	Moisés Sepúlveda	Chile

=== Venice Days ===
The following films were selected for the 10th edition of the Venice Days (Giornate degli Autori) section: Starting from this edition, Venice Days has created its own international award "for a film from the entire Official Selection".

English title	Original title	Director(s)	Production country
In Competition
Alienation	Otchuzhdenie	Milko Lazarov	Bulgaria
Bethlehem		Yuval Adler	Israel, Germany, Belgium
Gerontophilia		Bruce LaBruce	Canada
The Good Life	La belle vie	Jean Denizot	France
Kill Your Darlings		John Krokidas	United States
May in the Summer		Cherien Dabis	Jordan, Qatar, United States
My Class	La mia classe	Daniele Gaglianone	Italy
Nobody's Home	Köksüz	Deniz Akçay	Turkey
The Reconstruction	La reconstrucción	Juan Taratuto	Argentina
Rigor Mortis	Geung si	Juno Mak	Hong Kong
Siddharth		Richie Mehta	Canada, India
Traitors		Sean Gullette	Morocco, United States
Special Events
Julia		J. Jackie Baier	Germany, Lithuania
Lenny Cooke		Benny and Josh Safdie	United States
Lino Miccichè, mio padre - Una visione del mondo		Francesco Miccichè	Italy
The Referee	L'arbitro	Paolo Zucca	Italy, Argentina
Secchi		Edo Natoli	Italy
Three Many Weddings	3 bodas de más	Javier Ruiz Caldera	Spain
Venezia Salva		Serena Nono	Italy
Miu Miu Women's Tales
Le Donne della Vucciria		Hiam Abbass	Italy
The Door		Ava DuVernay	United States, Italy
Lux Prize
The Selfish Giant		Clio Barnard	United Kingdom
Honey	Miele	Valeria Golino	Italy
The Broken Circle Breakdown		Felix Van Groeningen	Belgium

Highlighted title indicates the official Venice Days Award winner.

== Official Awards ==
=== In Competition (Venezia 70) ===
- Golden Lion: Sacro GRA by Gianfranco Rosi
- Silver Lion for Best Director: Alexandros Avranas for Miss Violence
- Grand Jury Prize: Stray Dogs by Tsai Ming-liang
- Volpi Cup for Best Actor: Themis Panou for Miss Violence
- Volpi Cup for Best Actress: Elena Cotta for A Street in Palermo
- Marcello Mastroianni Award: Tye Sheridan for Joe
- Best Screenplay: Steve Coogan and Jeff Pope for Philomena
- Special Jury Prize: The Police Officer's Wife by Philip Gröning

=== Golden Lion for Lifetime Achievement ===
- William Friedkin

=== Orizzonti ===
- Best Film: Eastern Boys by Robin Campillo
- Best Director: Uberto Pasolini for Still Life
- Special Jury Prize: Ruin by Amiel Courtin-Wilson & Michael Cody
- Special Award for Innovative Content: Shahram Mokri for Fish & Cat
- Horizons Award for Best Short Film: Kush by Shubhashish Bhutiani

=== Venice Classics Awards ===
- Best Restored Film: Property Is No Longer a Theft by Elio Petri
- Best Documentary on Cinema: Double Play: James Benning and Richard Linklater by Gabe Klinger

=== Luigi De Laurentiis Venice Award For A Debut Film ===
- White Shadow by Noaz Deshe

=== Special awards ===
- Persol Tribute to Visionary Talent Award: Andrzej Wajda
- Jaeger-LeCoultre Glory to the Filmmaker Award: Ettore Scola
- L’Oréal Paris per il Cinema Award: Eugenia Costantini

== Independent Sections Awards ==
=== Venice International Film Critics' Week ===
- Arca CinemaGiovani Award – Best Italian film: The Art of Happiness by Alessandro Rak
- FEDIC Award: Zoran, My Nephew the Idiot by Matteo Oleotto
  - Special mention: The Art of Happiness by Alessandro Rak
- Fedeora Awards
  - Best Film: Class Enemy by Rok Bicek
  - Award for Best Cinematography: Inti Briones for The Quispe Girls by Sebastián Sepúlveda
    - Special mention: Giuseppe Battiston for his role in Zoran, My Nephew the Idiot
    - Special mention: Anna Odell for complete author’s work in the film The Reunion
- "RaroVideo" Audience Award: Zoran, My Nephew the Idiot by Matteo Oleotto
- Schermi di Qualità Award: Zoran, My Nephew the Idiot by Matteo Oleotto

=== Venice Days (Giornati degli Autori) ===
- Venice Days Award: Kill Your Darlings by John Krokidas
- Label Europa Cinemas Award: The Good Life by Jean Denizot
  - Special mention: Alienation by Milko Lazarov
- Lina Mangiacapre Award – Special mention: Traitors by Sean Gullette
- Fedeora Awards:
  - Best Film: Bethlehem by Yuval Adler
  - Best director of a debut film: Milko Lazarov for Alienation
    - Special mention: The Good Life by Jean Denizo

== Independent Awards ==
The following collateral awards were conferred to films of the official selection:

=== FIPRESCI Awards ===
- Best Film (Main competition): Tom at the Farm by Xavier Dolan
- Best Film (Critics' Week): The Reunion by Anna Odell

=== Queer Lion ===
- Philomena by Stephen Frears

=== SIGNIS Award ===
- Philomena by Stephen Frears
  - Special mention: Ana Arabia by Amos Gitai

=== Francesco Pasinetti (SNGCI) Award ===
- Best Film: Still Life by Uberto Pasolini
- Best Actors: Elena Cotta, Alba Rohrwacher, Antonio Albanese
  - Special mention: Maria Rosaria Omaggio in Walesa. Man of Hope
  - Special mention: The Third Half by Enrico Maria Artale

=== Open Award ===
- Serena Nono for directing Venezia salva

=== Leoncino d'Oro Agiscuola Award ===
- Sacro GRA by Gianfranco Rosi

=== Cinema for UNICEF mention ===
- Philomena by Stephen Frears

=== Brian Award ===
- Philomena by Stephen Frears

=== Arca CinemaGiovani Award - Venezia 70 ===
- Miss Violence by Alexandros Avranas

=== Christopher D. Smithers Foundation Award ===
- Joe by David Gordon Green

=== CICT - UNESCO "Enrico Fulchignoni" Award ===
- At Berkeley by Frederick Wiseman

=== CICAE - Cinema d’Arte e d’Essai Award ===
- Still Life by Uberto Pasolini

=== Fedeora Award for Best Euro-Mediterranean film ===
- Miss Violence by Alexandros Avranas

=== Fondazione Mimmo Rotella Award ===
- L'intrepido by Gianni Amelio

=== Future Film Festival Digital Award ===
- Gravity by Alfonso Cuarón
  - Special mention: The Zero Theorem by Terry Gilliam

=== P. Nazareno Taddei Award ===
- Philomena by Stephen Frears

=== Lanterna Magica (CGS) Award ===
- L'intrepido by Gianni Amelio

=== Lina Mangiacapre Award ===
- Via Castellana Bandiera by Emma Dante
  - Special mention: Femen’s activists of Ukraine Is Not a Brothel by Kitty Green

=== Golden Mouse ===
- Philomena by Stephen Frears
  - Special mention: Stray Dogs by Tsai Ming-liang
- Silvier Mouse: At Berkeley by Frederick Wiseman
- Special mention: Home from Home by Edgar Reitz

=== UK-ITALY Creative Industries Award – Best Innovative Budget ===
- The Third Half by Enrico Maria Artale
- Medeas by Andrea Pallaoro
- Kush by Shubhashish Bhutiani

=== Interfilm Award for Promoting Interreligious Dialogue ===
- Philomena by Stephen Frears

=== Gillo Pontecorvo Award ===
- Con il fiato sospeso by Costanza Quatriglio

=== Green Drop Award ===
- Ana Arabia by Amos Gitai

=== Young Jury Members of the Vittorio Veneto Film Festival ===
- Philomena by Stephen Frears
  - Special mention for a debut film: Via Castellana Bandiera by Emma Dante

=== "Civitas Vitae prossima" Award ===
- Still Life by Uberto Pasolini

=== Soundtrack Stars Award ===
- Best Soundtrack Award: Via Castellana Bandiera by Emma Dante
  - Special mention for Best Contemporary Actor: Ryuchi Sakamoto (Venezia 70 Jury member)

=== Ambiente WWF Award ===
- Amazonia by Thierry Ragobert

=== Bianchi Award ===
- Enzo d’Aló
