= Ka-Boom =

- Country: Italy
- Broadcast area: Italy
- Headquarters: Granarolo dell'Emilia, Località Cadriano (BO), Via Buozzi nn. 24-26

Programming
- Language: Italian
- Picture format: 576i (16:9 SDTV)

Ownership
- Owner: DYNIT s.r.l.

History
- Launched: 23 September 2013; 12 years ago
- Closed: 30 May 2015; 10 years ago

Links
- Website: ka-boom.it (archived)

Availability

Terrestrial
- Digital: LCN 139

Ka-Boom was an Italian children's programming block. It was aimed at children between the ages of 8 and 14.

== History ==
After period of experimental services started 3 July 2013, Ka-Boom was launched on 23 September 2013.

== Availability ==
It was available free to air on digital terrestrial television multiplex Tivuitalia.

== Programming ==
=== Animated series ===
- Boys Be...
- Ceres, Celestial Legend
- Chi's Sweet Home
- Fresh World Cocomon
- Gin Tama (second season)
- Growing Up With Hello Kitty
- Heroes of the City
- Oh My Goddess!
- Sugarbunnies
- Sugarbunnies: Chocolat!
- X

== See also ==
- Rai Gulp
- Rai YoYo
- Boing
- Cartoonito
- K2
- Frisbee
