= L'intrepido =

2013 film

- Film poster
- Directed by: Gianni Amelio
- Written by: Davide Lantieri; Gianni Amelio
- Starring: Antonio Albanese
- Cinematography: Luca Bigazzi
- Music by: Franco Piersanti
- Release dates: 4 August 2013 (Venice); 5 September 2013 (Italy)
- Running time: 104 minutes
- Country: Italy
- Language: Italian

L'intrepido is a 2013 Italian comedy film directed by Gianni Amelio. It was screened in the main competition section of the 70th Venice International Film Festival and in the Special Presentation section at the 2013 Toronto International Film Festival.

== Plot ==
Antonio lives in Milan, but does not have a steady job. His specialty is to replace other workers for a short time, since he likes to pretend to be someone else. But Antonio soon realizes he must do something more concrete in his life, and so devotes to his son, a young musician, who often fears of performing in concert.

== Cast ==
- Antonio Albanese as Antonio Pane
- Livia Rossi as Lucia
- Gabriele Rendina as Ivo Pane
- Toni Santagata as Maltese
- Sandra Ceccarelli as Adriana
