= Gianfranco Rosi =

Italian documentary filmmaker

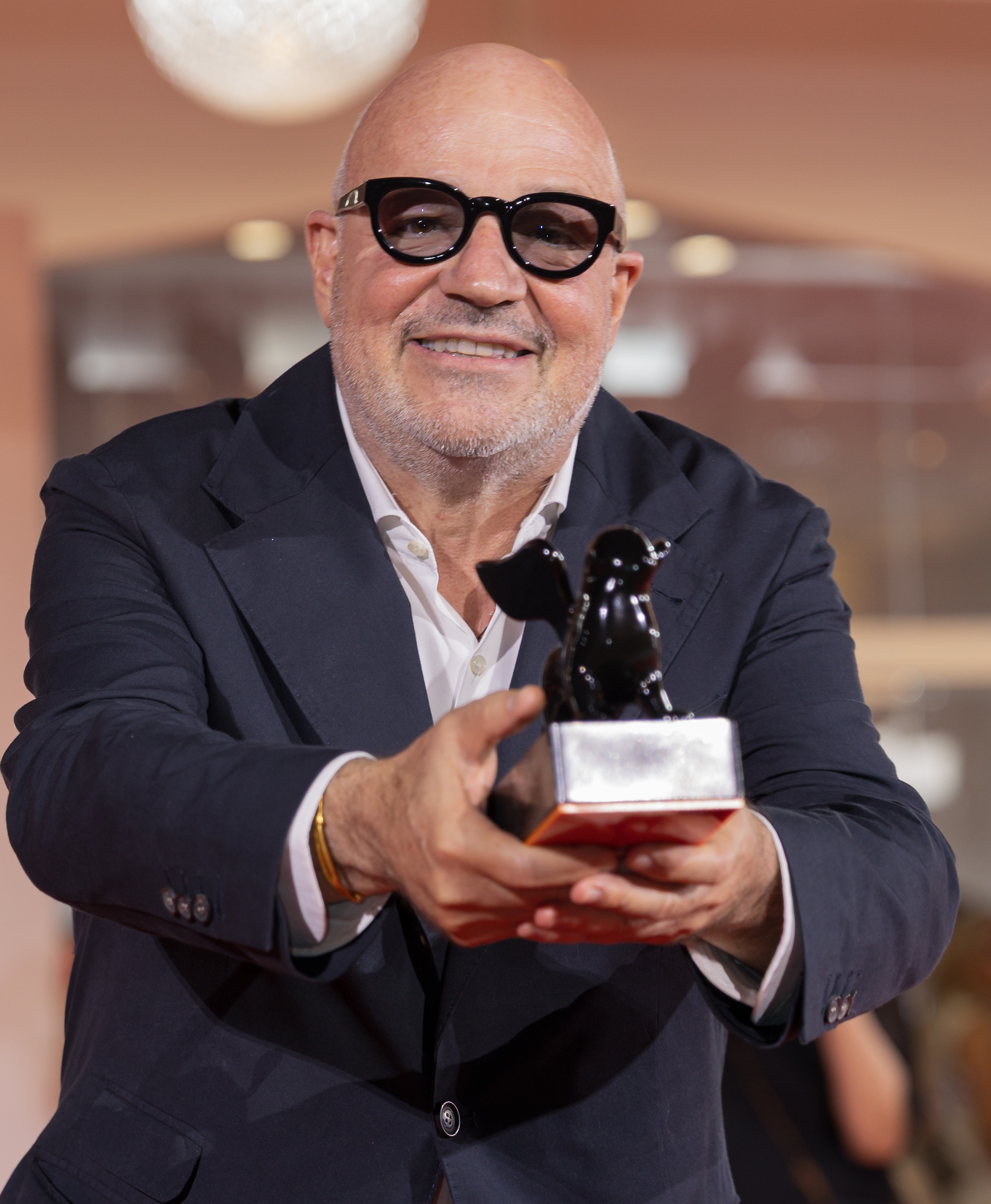
- Rosi in 2025
- Born: 30 November 1963 (age 62); Asmara, Ethiopia
- Citizenship: Italian; American
- Education: New York University
- Occupation: Documentary filmmaker
- Years active: 1993–present
- Children: 1

Gianfranco Rosi (Italian pronunciation: [dʒaɱˈfraŋko ˈrɔːzi]; born 30 November 1963) is an Italian-American filmmaker. He is most known for his documentaries, including 2013's Sacro GRA, for which he won the Golden Lion, and 2016's Fire at Sea, for which he won the Golden Bear and was nominated for the Academy Award for Best Documentary.

Rosi is the only documentary filmmaker to win the highest award at two of the three major European film festivals (Venice, Berlin and Cannes), and is the one of five directors to do it in the 21st century.

== Early life ==
Rosi was born in 1963 in Asmara. His Italian father worked there as foreign section manager for a bank owned by the IRI. Because of the threat posed by the ongoing Eritrean War of Independence, his parents brought him back to Italy when he was 11. He grew up in Italy and Turkey. At age 19, Rosi dropped out of the University of Pisa, where he was studying medicine, to attend New York University Film School. He stayed in the United States, eventually gaining dual citizenship.

== Career ==
After graduation, Rosi found his first feature project after being told that Miami, where he shot his student film, reminded of Benares, the holy city in India where Hindus go to die. He spent five years there documenting life around the banks of the Ganges, resulting in the anthropological documentary Boatman (1993), which was presented at various international film festivals, including Sundance, Locarno, Toronto and Amsterdam.

His first feature film, Below Sea Level (2008), was shot over the course of four years among the residents of the unincorporated community of Slab City, California. It won the Best Documentary Award in the Orizzonti section of the 65th Venice International Film Festival.

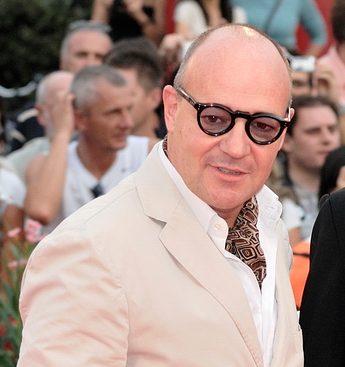
Rosi at the 2009 Venice Film Festival.

Having befriended author Charles Bowden during the production of Below Sea Level, Rosi was offered to make a film from his 2009 Harper's Magazine article The Sicario and directed El Sicario, Room 164 (2010), a face-to-face conversation with a Juárez Cartel sicario claiming over 200 killings. Once again, it premiered in competition in the Orizzonti sidebar at the 67th Venice International Film Festival.

Rosi then made his first Italian feature, Sacro GRA (2013), for which he lived for almost three years in a trailer near the Grande Raccordo Anulare, a circular ring road motorway encompassing the center of Rome, documenting the stories of people around it. The film was the first documentary film to ever be entered in the main competition of the Venice Film Festival, and ended up winning the Golden Lion at the 70th Venice International Film Festival, its highest award, becoming both the first documentary in Venice's history and the first Italian film in 15 years to receive the award. The unexpected win raised Rosi's profile considerably, although inside Italy he had to contend with some prominent voices opposing the idea of awarding a non-fiction work with the Golden Lion, such as journalist Curzio Maltese and filmmaker Pupi Avati.

Following his Venice win, the Istituto Luce approached Rosi to direct a short film about the 2013 migrant shipwreck at the coast of the Italian island of Lampedusa, but he soon scrapped the project for a full-length documentary on Italy's societal response of the ongoing 2015 European migrant crisis. The project eventually became Fire at Sea (2016), filmed for almost a year in Lampedusa, focusing on the crisis as seen through the people of the island, such as 12-years old Samuele and migrants' doctor Pietro Bartolo. It was entered in the main competition of the 66th Berlin International Film Festival, winning once again a festival's highest award, this time the Golden Bear, and receiving widespread international critical acclaim upon its release. The film was the first documentary submitted by Italy for the Academy Award for Best Foreign Film category, although it didn't make the final shortlist, it was nominated for Best Documentary Feature at the 89th Academy Awards. It also won the European Film Award for Best Documentary.

Following the motifs of the 2015 European migrant crisis, he shot his Notturno (2020) over the course of three years, following closely the population who lived in war zones, between the middle eastern countries of Syria, Iraq, Kurdistan and Lebanon. The film marked Rosi's return to the main competition of the 77th Venice International Film Festival and was selected once again as Italy's submission for the Academy Awards, without making the final shortlist.

In 2022, Rosi directed his first archival footage documentary feature film, In Viaggio: The Travels of Pope Francis (2022), following the 37 international visits in 53 countries of Pope Francis. The film premiered out of competition at the 79th Venice International Film Festival, to critical acclaim.

== Personal life ==
Rosi has a daughter, Emma (born 1999 or 2000), from a previous marriage which ended in the late 2000s.

== Filmography ==
=== Documentaries ===
Year	English Title	Original title	Cinematographer	Producer	Sound technician
1993	Boatman		Yes	Yes	Yes
2008	Below Sea Level		Yes	Yes	Yes
2010	El Sicario, Room 164		Yes	Yes	—N/a
2013	Sacro GRA		Yes	—N/a	Yes
2016	Fire at Sea	Fuocoammare	Yes	Yes	Yes
2020	Notturno		Yes	Yes	Yes
2022	In Viaggio: The Travels of Pope Francis	In viaggio	Yes	Yes	—N/a
2025	Below the Clouds	Sotto le nuvole	Yes	Yes	—N/a

== Awards and nominations ==
Year	Award	Category	Work	Result	Ref(s)
2009	European Film Awards	Best Documentary	Below Sea Level	Nominated	
2013	Venice International Film Festival	Golden Lion	Sacro GRA	Won	
2014	European Film Awards	Best Documentary	Sacro GRA	Nominated	
2016	Berlin International Film Festival	Golden Bear	Fire at Sea	Won	
2016	Berlin International Film Festival	Prize of the Ecumenical Jury	Fire at Sea	Won	
2016	David di Donatello Awards	Best Film	Fire at Sea	Nominated	
2016	David di Donatello Awards	Best Director	Fire at Sea	Nominated	
2016	European Film Awards	Best Documentary	Fire at Sea	Won	
2016	European Film Awards	People's Choice Award for Best European Film	Fire at Sea	Nominated	
2017	Academy Awards	Best Documentary Feature	Fire at Sea	Nominated	
2017	César Awards	Best Documentary Film	Fire at Sea	Nominated	
2020	Venice International Film Festival	Golden Lion	Notturno	Nominated	
2025	Venice International Film Festival	Special Jury Prize	Below the Clouds	Won	
2025	Venice International Film Festival	Golden Lion	Below the Clouds	Nominated	
