= Zoran, My Nephew the Idiot =

- Film poster
- Directed by: Matteo Oleotto
- Written by: Daniela Gambaro; Pierpaolo Piciarelli; Marco Pettenello; Matteo Oleotto
- Produced by: Igor Princic
- Starring: Giuseppe Battiston; Rok Prasnikar; Roberto Citran; Marjuta Slamic; Riccardo Maranzana; Teco Celio
- Cinematography: Ferran Paredes
- Edited by: Giuseppe Trepiccione
- Music by: Antonio Gramentieri
- Production companies: Transmedia; Staragara; Arch Production; RTV Slovenija
- Distributed by: Cirko Film (Hungary); Tucker Film (Italy); Lighthouse Home Entertainment (Germany) (DVD); Movienet (Germany)
- Release date: 13 September 2013
- Running time: 106 minutes
- Countries: Italy; Slovenia
- Languages: Italian; Slovenian

Zoran, My Nephew the Idiot (Italian: Zoran - Il mio nipote scemo) is a 2013 Italian-Slovenian comedy film directed by Matteo Oleotto. It was screened in the Critics' Week section at the 70th Venice Film Festival.

== Plot ==
The divorced scoundrel Paolo lives close to the border to Slovenia in a little town in the Italian Province of Gorizia. He is so short of money that his former wife and her new husband invite him over each Sunday for a free meal. Due to the demise of an aunt from the other side of the border Paolo learns he has a nephew named Zoran. Paolo is not the paternal type but Zoran is a natural when it comes to darts. He senses there might be a fortune in reach if he adopts Zoran and registers him for an open tournament in Scotland.

== Cast ==
- Giuseppe Battiston: Paolo Bressan
- Rok Prasnikar: Zoran
- Roberto Citran: Alfio
- Marjuta Slamic: Stefanja
- Riccardo Maranzana: Ernesto
- Teco Celio: Gustino
