= A Street in Palermo =

2013 film

- Film poster
- Italian: Via Castellana Bandiera
- Directed by: Emma Dante
- Written by: Emma Dante; Giorgio Vasta
- Produced by: Gregorio Paonessa; Marta Donzelli; Mario Gianani; Lorenzo Mieli; Andres Pfaeffli; Elda Guidinetti
- Starring: Emma Dante; Elena Cotta; Alba Rohrwacher
- Cinematography: Gherardo Gossi
- Release dates: 29 August 2013 (Venice); 19 September 2013 (Italy)
- Running time: 90 minutes
- Country: Italy
- Language: Italian

A Street in Palermo (Italian: Via Castellana Bandiera) is a 2013 Italian drama film written and directed by Emma Dante. It was screened in the main competition section at the 70th Venice International Film Festival. Elena Cotta won the Volpi Cup for Best Actress.

== Plot ==
During hot and sunny Sunday afternoon in Palermo, two women, Rosa and Clara, who have come to celebrate a friend's wedding, get lost in the streets of the city and end up in tiny alley: via Castellana Bandiera (a road that actually exists in the area of Mount Pellegrino).

At the same moment another car, driven by Samira and with the Calafiore family crammed inside, arrives in the opposite direction and enters the same street. Neither Rosa nor Samira, an old and stubborn woman driving her car, intend to give way to each other. Locked in their cars, the two women face off in a silent duel that takes place in the intimate violence of the looks. An all-female challenge punctuated by the refusal to drink, eat and sleep, more stubborn than the Palermo sun and more stubborn than the ferocity of the men around them.

Samira's family decides to make a bet with all the families they know to see which of the two women is the most stubborn, betting everything on Samira. Despite Clara's attempts to make Rosa desist and Samira's grandson to get her grandmother home, the duel doesn't stop as none of the two cars backs away. Rosa's stubbornness is motivated by a sense of frustration towards her mother and a city, Palermo, in which she has never felt at home, while Samira, almost turned to stone by years of mistreatment and by the death of her daughter, vents her pain in this duel.

The next morning, awakened from sleep, Rosa finds Samira still in the car with her hands on the wheel. It would seem that the old woman was evidently more stubborn than her, but paying a heavy price: Samira has, in fact, died at the wheel. As the Calafiore family gathers around the deceased woman, Rosa and Clara retreat, leaving the alley.

== Cast ==
- Emma Dante as Rosa
- Alba Rohrwacher as Clara
- Elena Cotta as Samira
- Renato Malfatti as Saro Calafiore
- Dario Casarolo as Nicolò
- Carmine Maringola as Filippo Mangiapane
- Sandro Maria Campagna as Santo
