= Sacro GRA =

- Italian release poster
- Directed by: Gianfranco Rosi
- Written by: Gianfranco Rosi
- Story by: Nicolò Bassetti
- Produced by: Roberta Ballarini; Paolo Del Brocco; Marco Visalberghi
- Cinematography: Gianfranco Rosi
- Edited by: Jacopo Quadri
- Production companies: Doclab S.r.l.; La Femme Endormie
- Distributed by: Officine UBU
- Release dates: 4 September 2013 (Venice); 19 September 2013 (Italy)
- Running time: 95 minutes
- Country: Italy
- Language: Italian
- Box office: $1,369,486

Sacro GRA (pronounced [ˈsaːkro dʒiˌɛrreˈa], Italian for "Holy GRA") is a 2013 Italian documentary film written and directed by Gianfranco Rosi. It follows the everyday life in the Grande Raccordo Anulare, in the outskirts of Rome.

The film had its world premiere in the 70th Venice International Film Festival on 4 September 2013, where it won the Golden Lion, becoming the first documentary film to win the festival's major prize. It was theatrically released in Italy on 19 September 2013 by Officine UBU.

== Synopsis ==
The film depicts life along the Grande Raccordo Anulare, the ring-road highway that surrounds Rome. Rosi spent over two years in filming, while the film editing requested eight months of work. According to the director, the film was inspired by Italo Calvino's novel Invisible Cities (1972), in which the explorer Marco Polo is imagined describing to Kublai Khan, the towns he visited throughout the Chinese Empire .

== Reception ==
On the review aggregator website Rotten Tomatoes, the film holds an approval rating of 77% based on 22 reviews, with an average rating of 7.3/10. The website's critics consensus reads, "Sacro GRA makes the most of its unusual focus, proving that a documentary about the history of a road can also be powerfully human." Metacritic, which uses a weighted average, assigned the film a score of 64 out of 100, based on 5 critics, indicating "generally favorable" reviews.

Matt Zoller Seitz of RogerEbert.com gave it 3.5/4 stars, noting that it seems "scattered and incomplete at times" but also that the "movie lingers in the imagination." He praised the "beauty" of the cinematography and commented that much interpretation is left to the viewer.

In contrast, Jay Weissberg of Variety argued that "the idea remains more absorbing than the final product" and suggested that it was ideal fodder for documentary film festivals.
