= Elena Cotta =

Italian actress (born 1931)

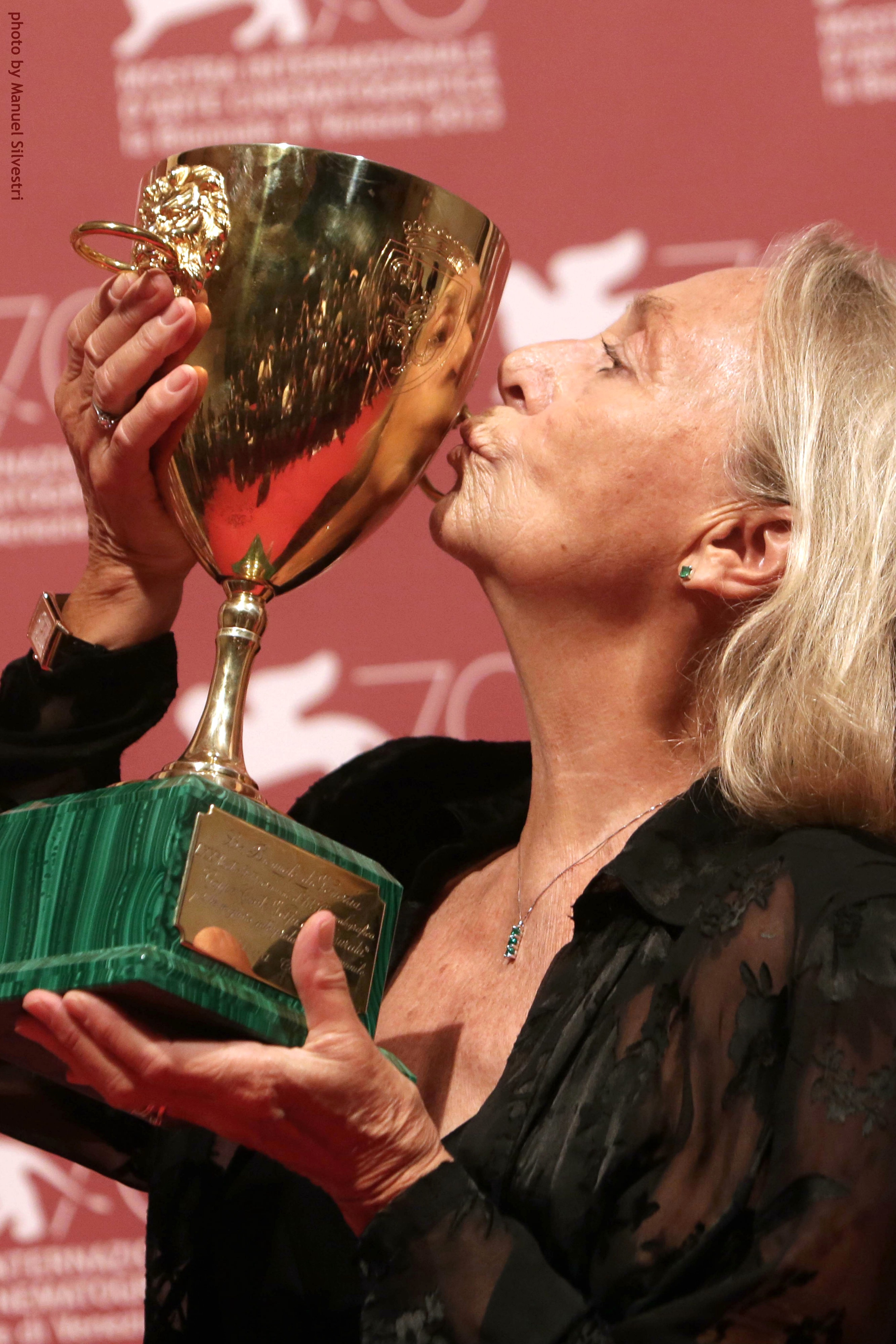
- Cotta at the 70th Venice International Film Festival
- Born: Elena Cotta Ramusino; 19 August 1931 (age 94); Milan, Kingdom of Italy
- Occupation: Actress
- Years active: 1951–present
- Spouse: Carlo Alighiero (m. 1952; died 2021)
- Children: 2
- Awards: Volpi Cup (2013)

Elena Cotta (born 19 August 1931) is an Italian stage, film and television actress.

== Life and career ==
Born in Milan, Italy, at a young age Cotta won a scholarship to attend the Accademia Nazionale di Arte Drammatica Silvio D'Amico; after just one year she quit the Academy to enter the stage company "La compagnia dei giovani". In 1975, she founded her own company together with her husband, Carlo Alighiero.

Cotta made her film debut in 1951, in Miracolo a Viggiù. In 2000, she was nominated as Best Supporting Actress at AFI award and FCCA Award for her performance in Kate Woods' Looking for Alibrandi. In 2013, at 82 years old, she won the Volpi Cup for Best Actress for her performance in A Street in Palermo, in which she played an old and stubborn Albanian woman.

== Partial filmography ==
- The Legend of the Piave (1952)
- Your Hands on My Body (1970)
- Looking for Alibrandi (2000)
- The Last Fashion Show (2011)
- A Street in Palermo (2013)
- Loro (2018)
- The Man Without Gravity (2019)
- Yara (2021)
- Everyone on Board (2022)
