= Alessandro Rak =

Italian filmmaker and cartoonist (born 1977)

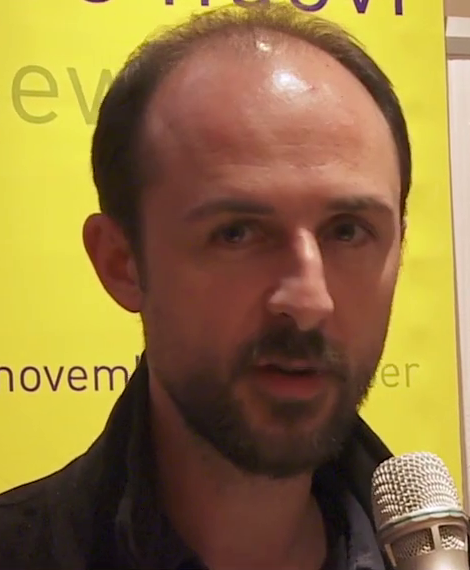
- Rak in 2013
- Born: 22 December 1977 (age 48); Naples, Italy
- Occupations: Film director Cartoonist

Alessandro Rak (born 22 December 1977), also known just as Rak, is an Italian film director, screenwriter, cartoonist and animator.

== Life and career ==
Born in Naples, Rak studied animation at the Centro Sperimentale di Cinematografia. His graduation animated short, Looking Death Window, won several international prizes. Returned in his hometown, in 2001, he founded with Andrea Scoppetta the animation studio Rak&Scop. After collaborating to several music videos and creating the comic series Ark and Zero or One, in 2007 he had his breakout with the comic series A Skeleton Story, co-created with Scopetta.

In 2013, Rak made his directorial feature debut with The Art of Happiness, which premiered at the 70th Venice International Film Festival and won the award for best animated film at the 27th European Film Awards. His following film Cinderella the Cat, a loose adaptation of the Giambattista Basile's fable of the same name and on Roberto De Simone's musical La Gatta Cenerentola, premiered at the 74th Venice International Film Festival, in the Horizons sidebar. His third feature, Yaya e Lennie – The Walking Liberty, had its world premiere at the 74th Locarno Film Festival.

== Filmography ==
- The Art of Happiness (2013)
- Cinderella the Cat (2017)
- Yaya e Lennie – The Walking Liberty (2021)
