= The Art of Happiness (film) =

- Film poster
- Italian: L'arte della felicità
- Directed by: Alessandro Rak
- Written by: Alessandro Rak; Luciano Stella; Nicola Barile; Paola Tortora
- Starring: Leandro Amato; Nando Paone; Renato Carpentieri
- Music by: Antonio Fresa; Luigi Scialdone
- Production companies: Big Sur; Mad Entertainment; Rai Cinema; MiBAC
- Distributed by: Istituto Luce Cinecittà
- Release dates: August 28, 2013 (Venice); November 21, 2013 (Italy)
- Running time: 82 minutes
- Country: Italy
- Language: Italian

The Art of Happiness (Italian: L'arte della felicità) is a 2013 Italian adult animated drama film written and directed by Alessandro Rak in his directorial debut. It opened the International Critics' Week at the 70th Venice International Film Festival.

== Plot ==
Sergio works as a taxi driver in Naples; under a heavy rain, he brings his customers through the increasingly degraded city. At the same time he tries to cope with the death of his brother, who departed for Tibet ten years before and never returned. On the seats of his taxi a singer, a radio speaker, an old uncle and other characters alternate, and each of them brings a trace of his missing brother.

== Cast ==
- Leandro Amato as Sergio Cometa
  - Luigi Meola as Young Sergio
- Nando Paone as Alfredo Cometa
  - Matteo Russo as Young Alfredo
- Renato Carpentieri as Luciano Cometa
- Jun Ichikawa as Antonia
- Lucio Allocca as Sergio and Alfredo's Father
- Iolanda Semez as Mrs. Pinotta, Sergio and Alfredo's mother.
- Patrizia Di Martino as Erika
- Antonio Brachi as Maurizio Brachetti
- Ciro Cesarano as Nando
- Silvia Baritska as Lariza
- Riccardo Polizzy Carbonelli as Speaker
- Gennaro Matino as himself, the priest in Alfredo's funeral.
- Paola Tortora as Woman in Bass
- Dario Sansone as Man in Bass
- Antonio Funaro as the voice of the taxi's radio.
- Francesca Romana Bergamo as the voice of the radio news
- Robert Thurman as himself

== Accolades ==
The Art of Happiness won the award for best animated film at the 27th European Film Awards.

It also won the audience's award for Best Feature Film at the 2014 Raindance Film Festival.
