= Giovanni Coda =

Italian film director and photographer

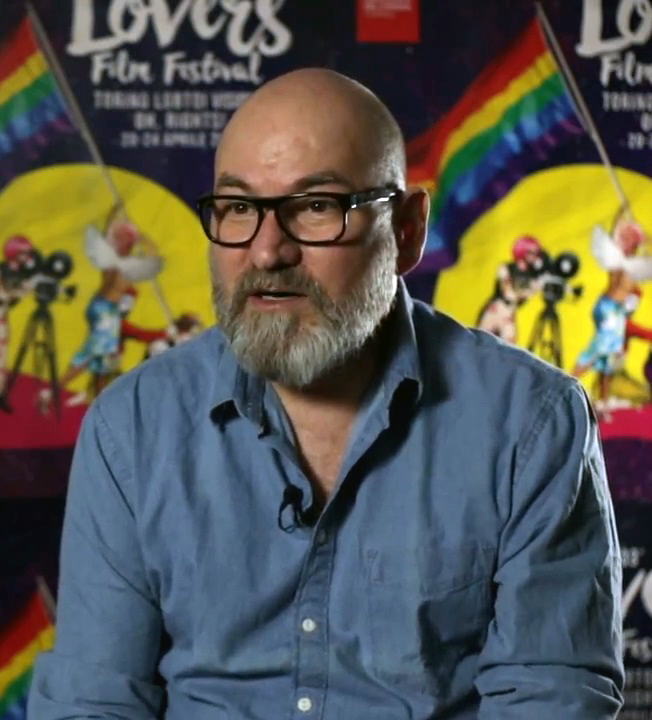
- Born: 19 January 1964; Cagliari, Sardinia, Italy
- Occupation(s): Film director, photographer
- Known for: Director of Il Rosa Nudo

Giovanni Coda (born 19 January 1964) is an Italian film director and photographer. He is the director of Il Rosa Nudo.

== Biography ==
Coda began his artistic career in the video art field in the early 1990s and had his exhibitions in many museums and art galleries in Venice (Biennale della Videoarte), Tokyo (Ayoama University), London (Watermans Arts Centre), Paris (Maison d’Italie), Madrid (Museo del Rejna Sofia), Milan (Biennale della Videoarte), Rome (Teatro Vittorio), among others. Since 1996 Coda is the director of the V-art Festival (Festival Internazionale Immagine d’Autore). In 2013, he directed his first feature film Il Rosa Nudo. He is currently an Advisory Council Member of the Social Justice Film Festival & Institute of Seattle

== Filmography (as a video art director) ==
Year	Film	Notes
1995	P-salm	Jury Recommendation at Catania Festival Videogramma (Estate Catanese directed by Franco Battiato).
1995	L’Attesa	Award for Best Film, Best Photography and Best Editing at Premio nazionale per il cortometraggio sociale Nickelodeon, Spoleto (Italy).
1996	L’Ombra del Ricordo	Award for Best Italian Short Film at Festival del Cinema di Arezzo 1996. Award for Best Photography at Festival del Cinema di Palermo.
1998	Il Passeggero	
2002	Serafina	
2005	Big Talk	
2012	Brightness	
2017	Xavier	

== Filmography (as a feature film director) ==
Year	Film	Notes
2013	Il Rosa Nudo (Naked Rose)	Gold Jury Prize in the Feature Films category at the 2013 edition of Seattle Social Justice Film Festival, USA. Special event, "for its high artistic, historical and moral value", in the 7th edition of the Queer Lion Award of the 70th Venice Film Festival 2013; Official Selection at Torino GLBT Film Festival 2013, Italy. Official Selection at Florence Queer Festival 2013, Italy. Official Selection at Naples Human Rights Film Festival 2013, Italy. Official Selection at Macon Film Festival 2014. Nomination for Best Narrative Feature, Best Directing, Best Acting, Best Editing. Macon, Georgia, USA. Official Selection at Athens International Film + Video Festival 2014, Athens, Ohio, USA. Film For Peace Award at Gothenburg Indie Film Fest 2014, Gothenburg, Sweden. Official Selection at KASHIS Mumbai Queer Film Festival 2014, Mumbai, India. Official Selection at 28th Festival Mix, Milan, Italy. Selected for the David di Donatello Award nominations 2013/14 in the Best Debut category, Italy. Selected for the Ciak d'Oro Award nominations 2014, Italy. Best International Film Award at 15th Melbourne Underground Film Festival (MUFF) 2014, Australia. Official Selection at Perlen Film Festival Hannover 2014, Germany. Award of Excellence at Accolade Competition 2014. Official Selection at Perlen Film Festival Hannover 2014, Germania. Gold Award at Documentary & Short International Movie Award 2014, Jakarta, Indonesia. Bronze Plaque Award at Columbus International Film & Video Festival 2014, USA. Diamond Award at International Film and Photography Festival (IFPF) 2014, Jakarta, Indonesia. Official Selection at CLIFF – Castlemaine Local and International Film Festival 2014, Australia. Bronze Palm Award Narrative Feature at Mexico International Film Festival 2015, Mexico.
2016	Bullied to Death	Official Selection at Torino GLBT Film Festival 2016, Turin, Italy. Official Selection at XX V-Art Festival Internazionale Immagine d'Autore, Cagliari, Italy. Official Selection at 30° Festival Mix, Milan, Italy. Best Avant-Garde Innovation Award at Melbourne Documentary Film Festival 2016, Australia. Official Selection at Macon Film Festival 2016, USA. Jury Special Mention at Iris Prize Festival 2016, Cardiff, U.K. Film of the Week at Amsterdam New Renaissance Film Festival 2017, Amsterdam, Netherlands. Special Mention Best Female Performance to Assunta Pittaluga at Italian Film Festival 2016, Cardiff, U.K. Special Mention Best Male Performance to Sergio Anrò at Italian Film Festival 2016, Cardiff, U.K. Jury Special Mention at Los Angeles Underground Film Festival, Los Angeles, USA. Best Feature Film Price at Omovies Festival, Naples, Italy. Best Feature Film Price at L'Aquila LGBT Film Festival, L'Aquila, Italy. Humanity Award 2017 at Amsterdam New Renaissance Film Festival 2017, Amsterdam, Netherlands.
2019	Mark's Diary	Film of the Week at Amsterdam New Renaissance Film Festival 2019, Amsterdam, Netherlands. Best Feature Fiction at Omovies Festival 2019, Naples, Italy. Best Art Film Award 2019 at Amsterdam New Renaissance Film Festival 2019, Amsterdam, Netherlands. Best Director LGBT Film Award 2019 at Amsterdam New Renaissance Film Festival 2019, Amsterdam, Netherlands. Best Experimental Feature at The Indie Gathering Cleveland, Ohio, USA. Honorable Mention at Columbus International Film and Animation Festival 2019, Columbus, Ohio, USA. Award Winner at Salento Rainbow Film Fest 2019, Lecce, Italy. Official Selection at Out here now 2019, Kansas City, Missouri, USA. Official Selection at 34° Lovers Film Festival, Turin, Italy. Official Selection at Salto Independent Film Festival 2019, Salto, Uruguay. Official Selection at Shanghai Pride Film Festival 2019, Shanghai, China. Semi-finalist at Australia Independent Film Festival 2019, Brisbane, Australia. Best Experimental Film Award at 6° Festival Cinematográfico de Mérida, Mexico. Best LGBTQ Feature Film at Love Story Film Festival 2020, London, UK.
2020	Histoire d’une larme	

== Sources ==
- Il videoartista cagliaritano autore cult del cinema indipendente, La Nuova Sardegna. Retrieved 25 June 2016.
- Il Corpo di Coda , Cinemecum. Retrieved 22 February 2014.
- Il Rosa Nudo, La Repubblica.it -TrovaCinema. Retrieved 22 February 2014.
- Maria Grosso, Florence Queer Festival. Liberatori, ironici, di inafferrabile sensualità, Alias supplemento del Il Manifesto, 2 November 2013. Retrieved 22 February 2014.
- "Il Rosa Nudo" di Giovanni Coda vince al Social Justice Film Festival di Seattle, cinemaitaliano.info. Retrieved 22 February 2014.
- Elisabetta Randaccio, Il Rosa Nudo: per una memoria dell'omocausto. Sulle orme di Pierre Seel. In Andrea Minuz e Guido Vitiello (ed.), La Shoah nel cinema italiano, pp. 196–198. Soveria Mannelli: Rubbettino. ISBN 978-88-498-3871-8.
