= Nicola Barile =

Italian screenwriter and director

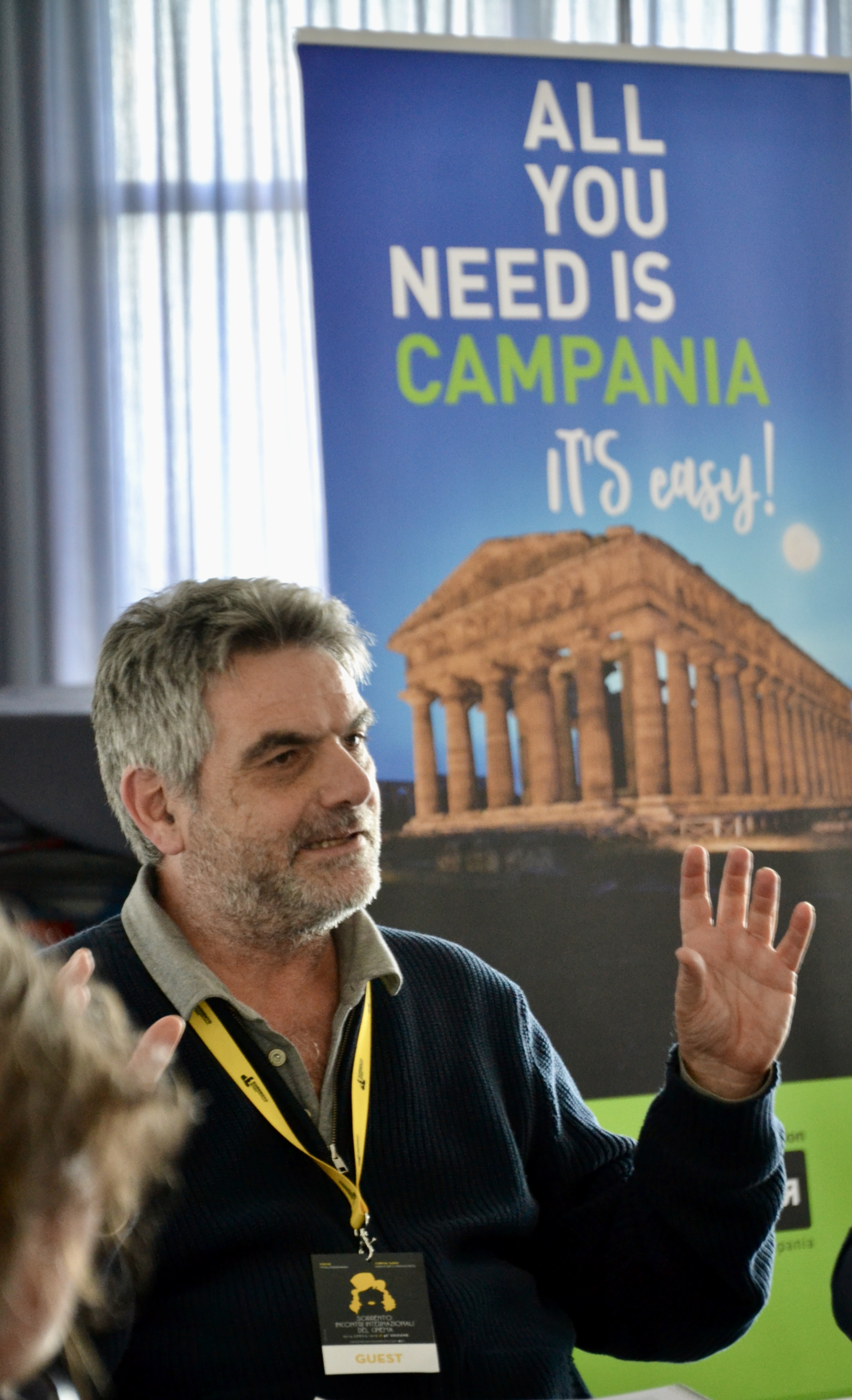
- Barile in Sorrento
- Born: 5 February 1962 (age 64); Santa Maria Capua Vetere, Italy
- Occupations: Screenwriter, director, children's author

Nicola Barile (born 5 February 1962) is an Italian screenwriter, director and children's author. His work includes television drama, children's animation and archaeological documentaries. He worked as a dialogue writer for Un posto al sole and co-wrote the animated television series Lola on Board. Since 2023, he has served as artistic director of FAB! – Festival dell'Archeologia di Bacoli.

== Career ==
=== Television writing and children's fiction ===
Barile worked as a dialogue writer for the Italian television soap opera Un posto al sole early in his career. In a 2025 interview, he described the experience as formative for his writing and professional discipline.

His fictional characters draw on the history and cultural heritage of Naples and its surroundings. They include Edo, inspired by Raimondo di Sangro, Prince of Sansevero, and Livia, a young girl whose adventures are set in ancient Pompeii.

Barile developed Livia following his work on archaeological documentaries. The comic books combine fictional adventures with historical information about the Roman world.

=== Animation ===
Barile founded Tilapia, a production company specialising in animation and educational content for children. His work includes Il piccolo Sansereno, an animated production featuring Edo and broadcast on Rai 2.

In 2014, Barile worked on Champagne, an animated production marking the fortieth anniversary of Peppino di Capri's song of the same name.

Barile also worked on Giga & Stick, an educational animation project developed with the Astronomical Observatory of Capodimonte, part of Italy's National Institute for Astrophysics. The project uses two characters, an elephant and a mouse, to introduce scientific concepts. It was subsequently developed into a virtual reality production.

Barile created Lola on Board with Giovanni Calvino and Giovanni Parisi, Guido Bozzelli, Stefania Iannaella and Marco Tramontano. The series comprises 26 seven-minute episodes aimed at preschool audiences and follows a young girl travelling on a cruise ship with her grandmother. Also known as Lola in crociera, the series credits Barile, Marco Tramontano and Marco Perrella as directors.

=== Documentaries ===
Barile has worked as a documentary filmmaker and producer on archaeological subjects. He has cited this experience as the starting point for his children's stories set in ancient Pompeii.

His documentary work includes Lo sposo di Napoli, about Achille Lauro, and productions developed in collaboration with the Centre Jean Bérard in Naples.

He also directed Pecunia non olet, a documentary exploring everyday life in ancient Pompeii through its smells, trades and workshops. The film was produced by TILE Storytellers in collaboration with the Archaeological Park of Pompeii.

=== Festival activities ===
In 2023, Barile became artistic director of FAB! – Festival dell'Archeologia di Bacoli, an archaeological film festival held in Bacoli, Italy.
