= Trilussa - Storia d'amore e di poesia =

- Written by: Peter Exacoustos; Paolo Logli; Alessandro Pondi
- Directed by: Lodovico Gasparini
- Starring: Michele Placido; Monica Guerritore; Renato Scarpa
- Theme music composer: Stelvio Cipriani
- Country of origin: Italy
- Original language: Italian

Production
- Producer: Mauro Berardi
- Cinematography: Saverio Guarna
- Editor: Carla Simoncelli

Original release
- Network: Rai 1
- Release: 11 March – 12 March 2013

Trilussa - Storia d'amore e di poesia is a 2013 Italian television film directed by Lodovico Gasparini. It was broadcast in two parts on 11 and 12 March 2013 on Rai 1.

== Plot ==
This historical biographical TV series is based on the life of the Italian poet Trilussa.

== Cast ==
- Michele Placido as Trilussa
- Monica Guerritore as Rosa
- Valentina Corti as Giselda
- Rodolfo Laganà as Rapiselli
- Emanuele Bosi as Arturo
- Stelvio Cipriani as Marcello
- Giorgio Colangeli as mastro Sergio
- Fabio Camilli as Longarini
- Giuseppe Loconsole as Annibale Carlacci
- Armando De Razza as Osvaldo Della Rocca
- Angela Antonini as Marisa Mars
- Alfredo Pea as Gabriele D'Annunzio
- Claudio Spadaro as Benito Mussolini
- Renato Scarpa as Pope Pius XI
- Pietro De Silva as Nestore
- Federica Vincenti as Gigolette
- Ninni Bruschetta as Director Malgesi
- Riccardo Zinna as Ivano
- Jinny Steffan as Odette

== Location ==
The series is filmed in Rome's most famous spots, such as:

- Palazzo Venezia
- Galleria Sciarra
- Villa Borghese
- Campidoglio
- Trastevere
- Palazzo Sacchetti
- Piazza Campitelli
- Piazza Costaguti
- Via dell'Arco dei Cenci
