= Il Rosa Nudo =

- Theatrical release poster
- Directed by: Giovanni Coda
- Written by: Giovanni Coda
- Produced by: ReindeerCat Solutions
- Starring: Gianni Dettori; Italo Medda; Sergio Anrò; Gianni Loi; Mattia Casanova; Francesco Ottonello; Mauro Ferrari; Luca Catalano; Lorena Piccapietra; Assunta Pittaluga; Carlo Porru; Cricot Teatro; Cesare Saliu: narrator; Massimo Aresu: narrator
- Cinematography: Antonio Cauterucci; Micaela Cauterucci
- Edited by: Andrea Lotta
- Music by: Irma Toudjian; Les Sticks Fluo; Quartetto Alborada
- Distributed by: ReindeerCat Solutions
- Release date: April 20, 2013 (Italy)
- Running time: 70 minutes
- Country: Italy
- Languages: Italian, English subtitles

Il Rosa Nudo (The Naked Rose) is a 2013 Italian film written and directed by Giovanni Coda. The film was shot in Quartu Sant'Elena and Siliqua, in Sardinia, Italy. The Italian premiere took place during the 2013 edition of the Torino GLBT Film Festival - Da Sodoma a Hollywood.

It was selected as a special event, "for its high artistic, historical and moral value", inside the 7th edition of the Queer Lion Award of the 70th Venice Film Festival 2013.

== Plot ==
Il Rosa Nudo (Naked Rose) is a film inspired by the life of Pierre Seel. The film focuses on an episode which will mark forever the existence of Seel, who was imprisoned by the Nazis at the age of seventeen: deported to the Schirmeck concentration camp, he witnessed the atrocious death of his partner. After the war he didn't speak to anyone about the reason for his imprisonment, and eventually he married and had three children.

In 1982, outraged by the violent attacks against gays by the Bishop of Strasbourg, he decided to write his autobiography and to denounce the atrocities he suffered.

Coda's film recalls the testimony of other victims of Nazi persecution of homosexuals and describes the pseudo-scientific experiments to which many of them were subjected by the SS physician Carl Vaernet.

== Awards and Official Selections ==
- Gold Jury Prize in the Feature Films category at the 2013 edition of Seattle Social Justice Film Festival.
- Special event, "for its high artistic, historical and moral value", inside the 7th edition of the Queer Lion Award of the 70th Venice Film Festival 2013.
- Official Selection at Torino GLBT Film Festival 2013.
- Official Selection at Florence Queer Festival 2013.
- Official Selection at Naples Human Rights Film Festival 2013.
- Official Selection at Macon Film Festival 2014. Nomination for Best Narrative Feature, Best Directing, Best Acting, Best Editing.
- Official Selection at Athens International Film + Video Festival 2014, Athens, Ohio, USA.
- Film For Peace Award at Gothenburg Indie Film Fest 2014, Gothenburg, Sweden.
- Official Selection at KASHIS Mumbai Queer Film Festival 2014, Mumbai, India.
- Official Selection at 28th Festival Mix, Milan.
- Selected for the David di Donatello Award nominations 2013/14 in the Best Debut category.
- Selected for the Ciak d'Oro Award nominations 2014.
- Best International Film Award at 15th Melbourne Underground Film Festival (MUFF) 2014, Australia.
- Award of Excellence at Accolade Competition 2014.
- Official Selection at Perlen Film Festival Hannover 2014, Germany.
- Gold Award at Documentary & Short International Movie Award 2014, Jakarta, Indonesia.
- Bronze Plaque Award at Columbus International Film & Video Festival 2014, USA.
- Diamond Award at International Film and Photography Festival (IFPF) 2014, Jakarta, Indonesia.
- Official Selection at CLIFF - Castlemaine Local and International Film Festival, 2014, Australia.
- Official Selection at Salento LGBT Film Fest 2014, Lecce, Italy.
- Best Feature Film Price at Omovies Film Fest 2014, Naples, Italy.
- Bronze Palm Award Narrative Feature at Mexico International Film Festival 2015, Mexico.

== See also ==
- Pierre Seel
- Persecution of homosexuals in Nazi Germany and the Holocaust
- LGBT rights in France
- Paragraph 175
- Pink triangle
- Violence against LGBT people
