= 66th David di Donatello =

2021 Italian film awards

- Date: 11 May 2021
- Site: Teatro dell'Opera di Roma and Fabrizio Frizzi Studios; Rome, Italy
- Hosted by: Carlo Conti

Highlights
- Best Picture: Hidden Away
- Most awards: Hidden Away (7)
- Most nominations: Hidden Away (15)

Television coverage
- Network: Rai 1
- Duration: 2 hours, 9 minutes

The 66th David di Donatello ceremony, presented by the Accademia del Cinema Italiano, honored the best in Italian cinema released from 1 January 2020 to 28 February 2021. The ceremony was hosted by presenter Carlo Conti and was held in two venues, Teatro dell'Opera di Roma and Fabrizio Frizzi Television Studios, both in Rome.

Drama film Hidden Away won seven awards, including Best Film, out of fifteen nominations. Other winners included Miss Marx and Rose Island with three, Tolo Tolo with two, 18 Presents, 1917, Anne, Bad Tales, Citizens of the World, Hammamet, Figli, The Life Ahead, My Name Is Francesco Totti, and The Predators with one.

== Winners and nominees ==
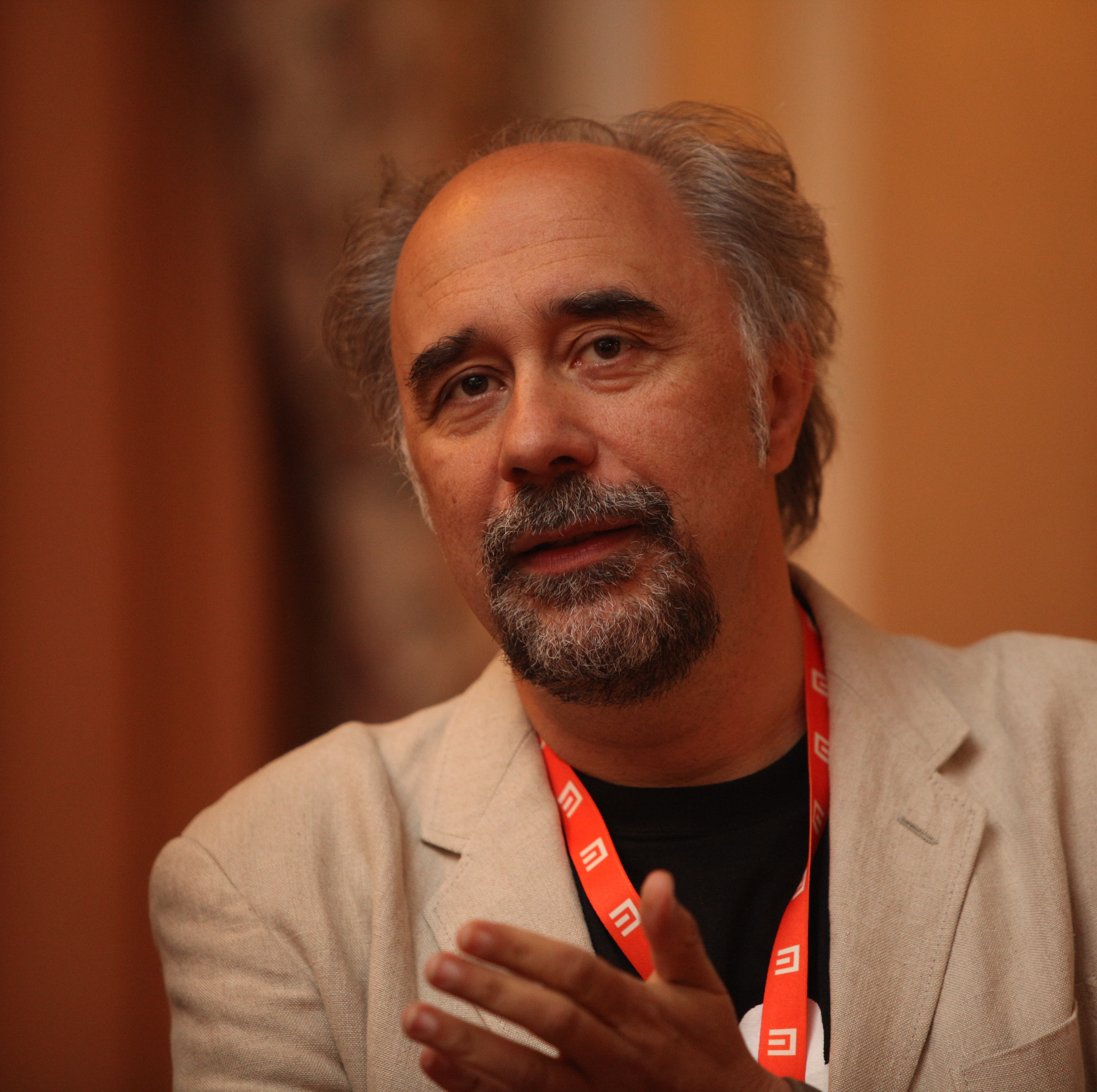
Giorgio Diritti, Best Film and Best Director winner

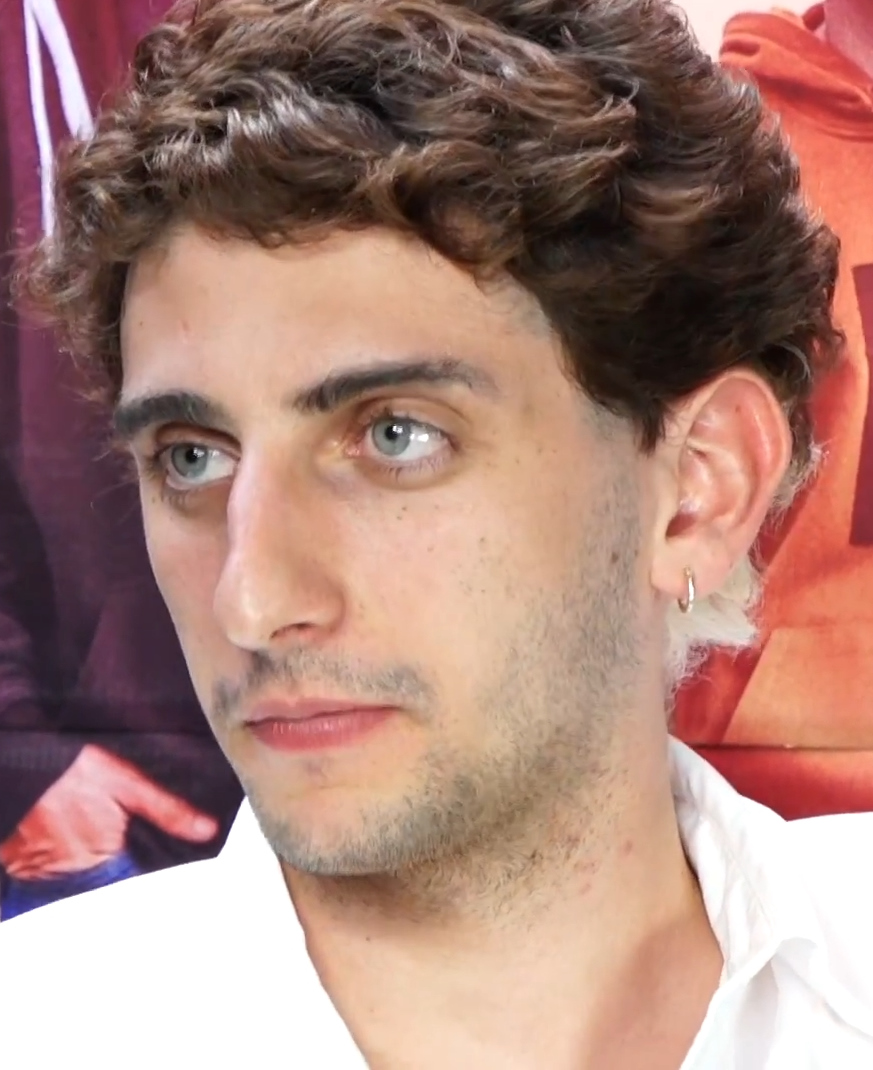
Pietro Castellitto, Best New Director winner

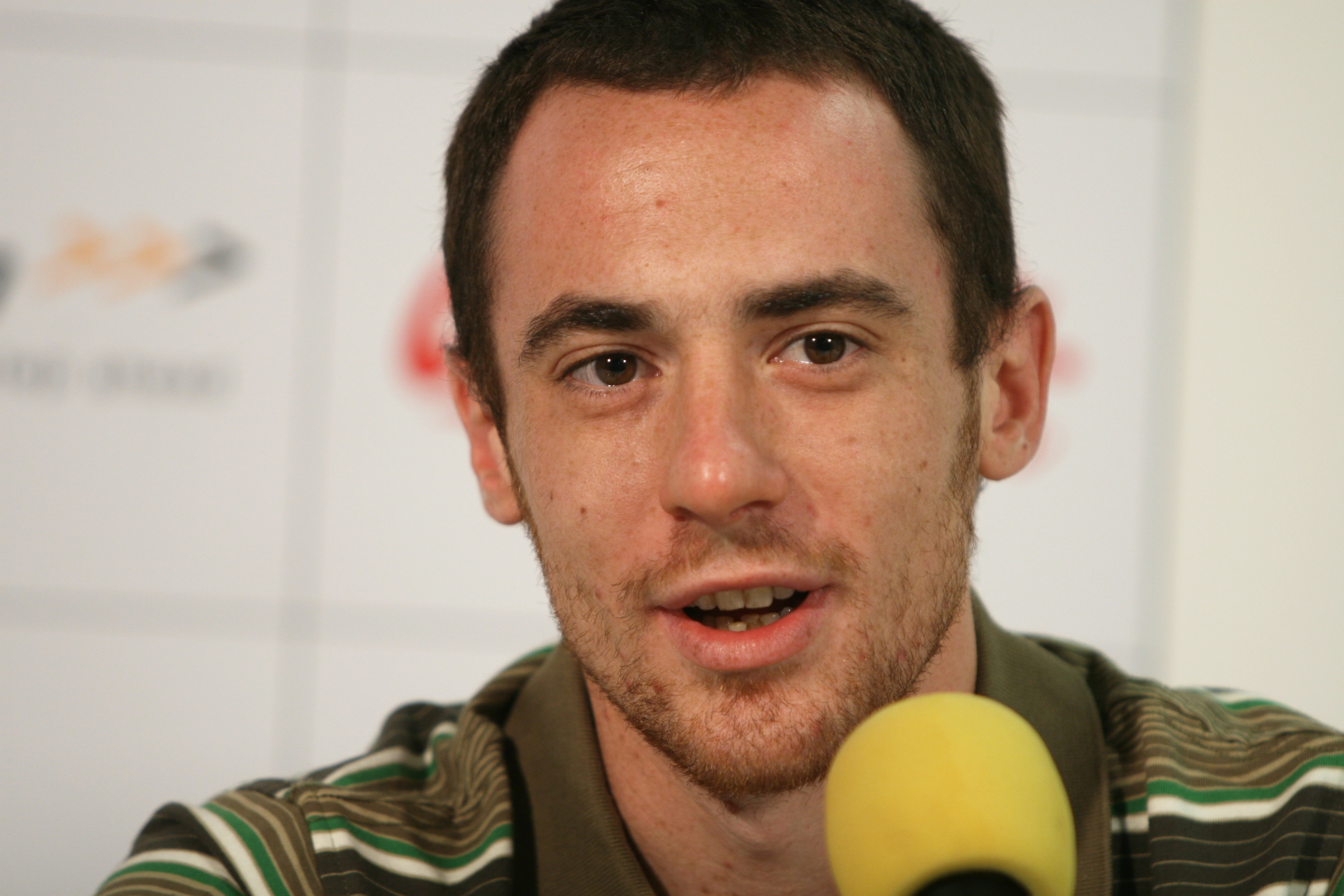
Elio Germano, Best Actor winner

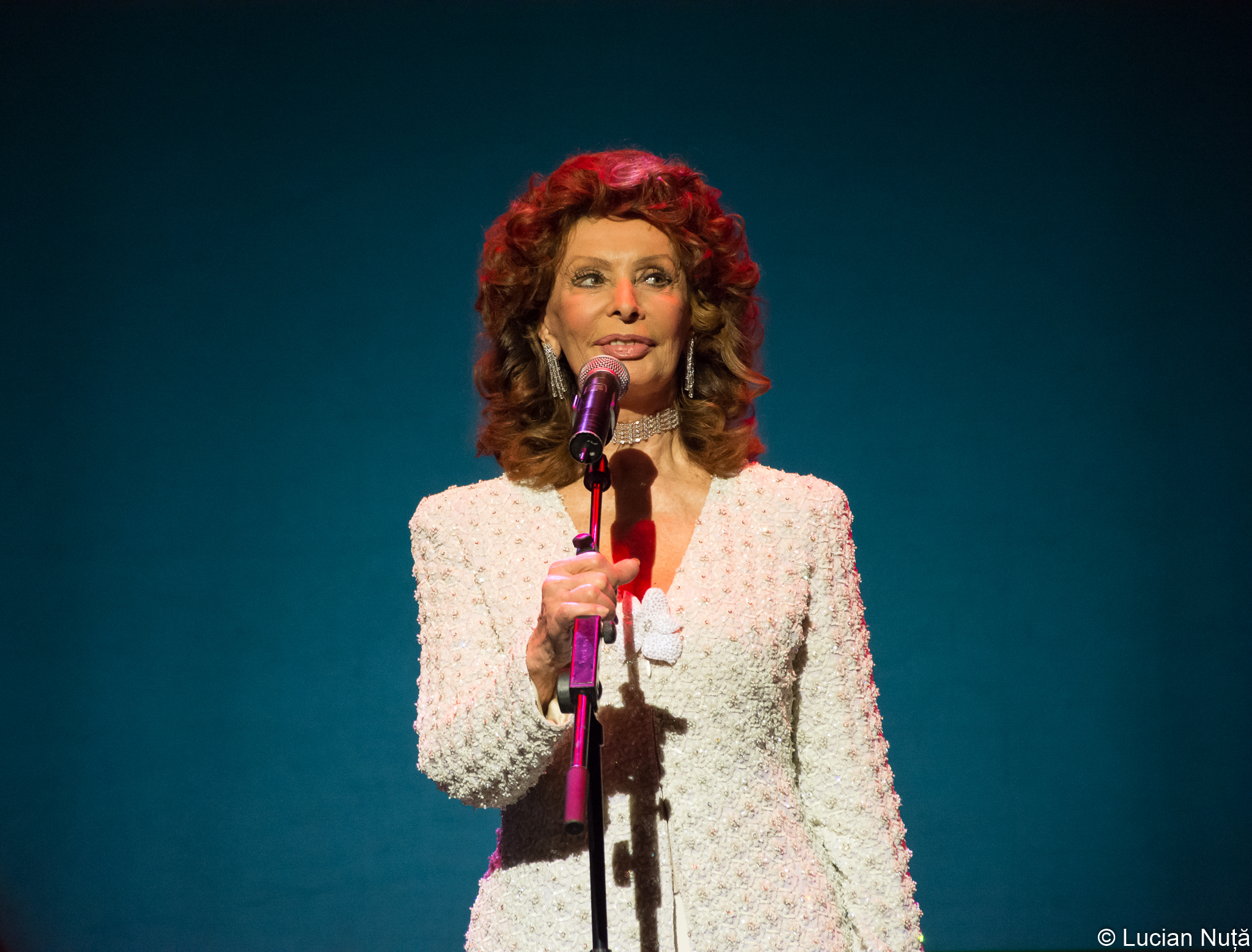
Sophia Loren, Best Actress winner

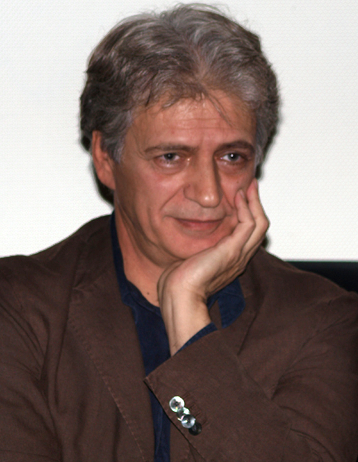
Fabrizio Bentivoglio, Best Supporting Actor winner

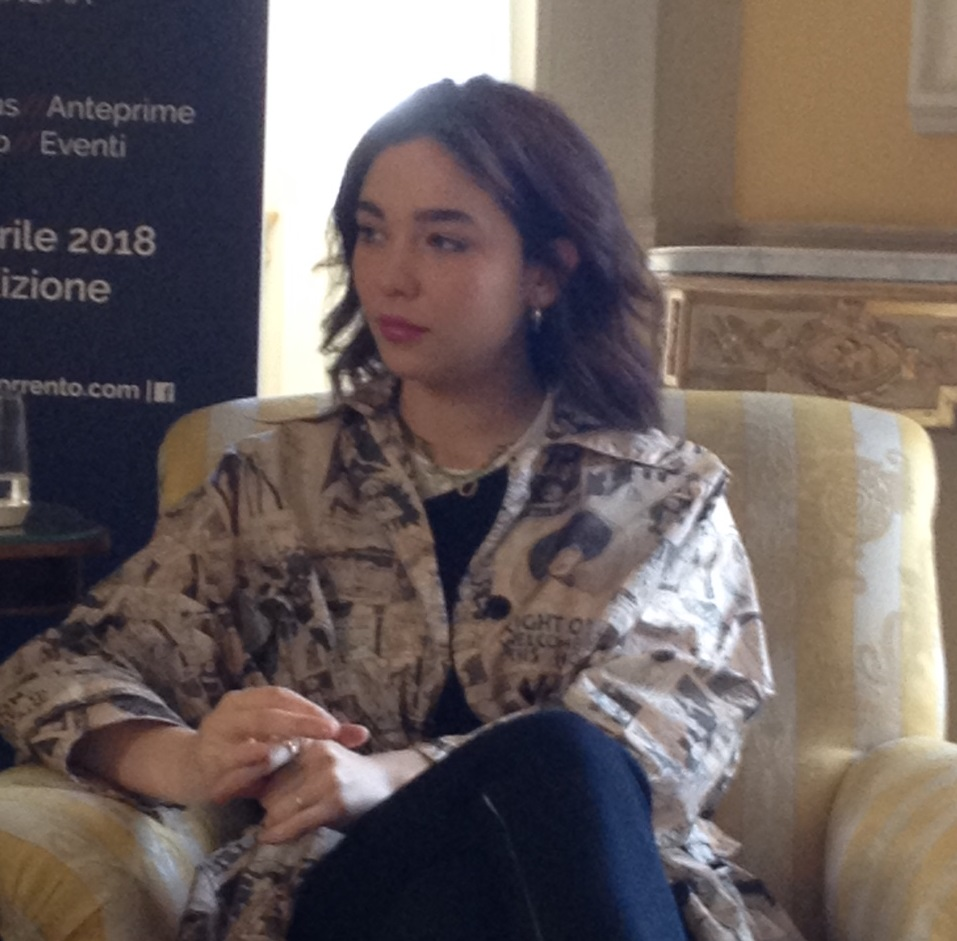
Matilda De Angelis, Best Supporting Actress winner

Winners are listed first, highlighted in boldface, and indicated with a double dagger (‡). The nominations were announced on 26 March 2021.

**Best Film**: **Hidden Away – Giorgio Diritti, director**‡; Bad Tales – Damiano and Fabio D'Innocenzo, directors; Hammamet – Gianni Amelio, director; The Macaluso Sisters – Emma Dante, director; Miss Marx – Susanna Nicchiarelli, director	**Best Producer**: **Miss Marx – Marta Donzelli, Gregorio Paonessa, Joseph Rouschop and Valérie Bournonville, producers; Vivo Film, Rai Cinema and Tarantula Belgique, production companies**‡; Bad Tales – Agostino Sacca, Giuseppe Sacca, producers; Pepito Produzioni, Rai Cinema, Vision Distribution and Amka Films, production companies; Hidden Away – Carlo Degli Esposti and Nicola Serra, producers; Rai Cinema, production company; The Predators – Domenico Procacci and Laura Paolucci, producers; Fandango and Rai Cinema, production companies; Rose Island – Matteo Rovere, producer; Groenlandia, production company
**Best Director**: **Giorgio Diritti – Hidden Away**‡; Damiano and Fabio D'Innocenzo – Bad Tales; Emma Dante – The Macaluso Sisters; Gianni Amelio – Hammamet; Susanna Nicchiarelli – Miss Marx	**Best New Director**: **Pietro Castellitto – The Predators**‡; Alice Filippi – Out of My League; Ginevra Elkann – If Only; Luca Medici – Tolo Tolo; Mauro Mancini – Thou Shalt Not Hate
**Best Actor**: **Elio Germano – Hidden Away as Antonio Ligabue**‡; Kim Rossi Stuart – Everything's Gonna Be Alright as Bruno Salvati; Pierfrancesco Favino – Hammamet as Bettino Craxi; Renato Pozzetto – We Still Talk as Giuseppe "Nino" Sgarbi; Valerio Mastandrea – Figli as Nicola	**Best Actress**: **Sophia Loren – The Life Ahead as Madame Rosa**‡; Alba Rohrwacher – The Ties as Vanda; Micaela Ramazzotti – The Best Years as Gemma; Paola Cortellesi – Figli as Sara; Vittoria Puccini – 18 Presents as Elisa Girotto
**Best Supporting Actor**: **Fabrizio Bentivoglio – Rose Island as Franco Restivo**‡; Gabriel Montesi – Bad Tales as Amelio Guerrini; Giuseppe Cederna – Hammamet as Vincenzo Sartori; Lino Musella – Bad Tales as Professor Bernardini; Silvio Orlando – The Ties as old Aldo	**Best Supporting Actress**: **Matilda De Angelis – Rose Island as Gabriella**‡; Alba Rohrwacher – If Only as Benedetta; Barbara Chichiarelli – Bad Tales as Dalila Placido; Benedetta Porcaroli – 18 Presents as Anna; Claudia Gerini – Hammamet as the lover
**Best Original Screenplay**: **Figli – Mattia Torre**‡; Bad Tales – Damiano and Fabio D'Innocenzo; Everything's Gonna Be Alright – Francesco Bruni and Kim Rossi Stuart; Hidden Away – Giorgio Diritti, Tania Pedroni and Fredo Valla; The Predators – Pietro Castellitto	**Best Adapted Screenplay**: **Citizens of the World – Marco Pettenello and Gianni Di Gregorio; based on the story by Di Gregorio**‡; Assandira – Salvatore Mereu; based on the novel by Giulio Angioni; The Ties – Francesco Piccolo, Domenico Starnone and Daniele Luchetti; based on the novel by Starnone; We Still Talk – Pupi Avati and Tommaso Avati; based on the novel by Giuseppe Sgarbi; You Came Back – Stefano Mordini, Francesca Marciano and Luca Infascelli; based on the novel by Christopher Coake
**Best Cinematography**: **Hidden Away – Matteo Cocco**‡; Bad Tales – Paolo Carnera; Hammamet – Luan Amelio Ujkaj; The Macaluso Sisters – Gherardo Gossi; Miss Marx – Crystel Fournier; Padrenostro – Michele D'Attanasio	**Best Production Design**: **Hidden Away – Paola Zamagni, Ludovica Ferrario and Alessandra Mura**‡; Bad Tales – Paolo Bonfini, Paola Peraro, Emita Frigato and Erika Aversa; Hammamet – Giancarlo Basili and Andrea Castorina; Miss Marx – Alessandro Vannucci, Igor Gabriel and Fiorella Cicolini; Rose Island – Tonino Zera and Maria Grazia Schirripa
**Best Score**: **Miss Marx – Gatto Ciliegia Contro II Grande Freddo and Downtown Boys**‡; Hammamet – Nicola Piovani; Hidden Away – Marco Biscarini and Daniele Furlati; The Predators – Niccolò Contessa; Rose Island – Michele Braga; Thou Shalt Not Hate – Pivio and Aldo De Scalzi	**Best Original Song**: **"Immigrato" from Tolo Tolo – Music and Lyrics by Checco Zalone and Antonio Iammarino; Performed by Checco Zalone**‡; "Gli anni più belli" from The Best Years – Music, Lyrics and Performed by Claudio Baglioni; "Invisible" from Hidden Away – Music and Lyrics by Marco Biscarini; Performed by La Tarma; "Io sì (Seen)" from The Life Ahead – Music by Diane Warren; Lyrics by Laura Pausini and Niccolò Agliardi; Performed by Laura Pausini; "Miles Away" from Thou Shalt Not Hate – Music by Pivio and Aldo De Scalzi; Lyrics and Performed by Ginevra Nervi
**Best Editing**: **Bad Tales – Esmeralda Calabria**‡; Hammamet – Simona Paggi; Hidden Away – Paolo Cottignola and Giorgio Diritti; Figli – Giogiò Franchini; Rose Island – Gianni Vezzosi	**Best Sound**: **Hidden Away – Carlo Missidenti, Filippo Toso, Francesco Tumminello, Luca Leprotti and Marco Biscarini**‡; Bad Tales – Marc Thill, Edgar Iacolenna, Fabio Pagotto, Simone Chiossi and Maxence Ciekawy; Hammamet – Emanuele Cicconi, Domenico Granata, Alessandro Giacco, Alberto Bernardi and Andrea Colaiacomo; Miss Marx – Adriano Di Lorenzo, Pierpaolo Merafino, Marc Bastien, Pierre Greco and Franco Piscopo; Rose Island – Claudio Bagni, Luigi Melchionda, Mirko Perri and Paolo Segat
**Best Costumes**: **Miss Marx – Massimo Cantini Parrini**‡; Hammamet – Maurizio Millenotti; Hidden Away – Ursula Patzak; The Macaluso Sisters – Vanessa Sannino; Rose Island – Nicoletta Taranta	**Best Visual Effects**: **Rose Island – Stefano Leoni and Elisabetta Rocca**‡; The Book of Vision – Renaud Quilichini and Lorenzo Cecotti; Hammamet – Luca Saviotti; Hidden Away – Rodolfo Migliari; Miss Marx – Massimiliano Battista
**Best Make-up Artist**: **Hammamet – Luigi Ciminelli, Andrea Leanza and Federica Castelli**‡; Hidden Away – Giuseppe Desiato and Lorenzo Tamburini; The Macaluso Sisters – Valentina Iannuccilli; Miss Marx – Diego Prestopino; Rose Island – Luigi Rocchetti	**Best Hairstyling**: **Hidden Away – Aldo Signoretti**‡; Bad Tales – Daniele Fiori; Hammamet – Massimiliano Duranti; The Macaluso Sisters – Aldina Governatori; Miss Marx – Domingo Santoro
**Best Documentary**: **My Name Is Francesco Totti – Alex Infascelli, director**‡; Faith – Valentina Pedicini, director; Notturno – Gianfranco Rosi, director; Punta Sacra – Francesca Mazzoleni, director; The Rossellinis – Alessandro Rossellini, director	**Best Short Film**: **Anne – Domenico Croce and Stefano Malchiodi, directors**‡; The Family Gold – Emanuele Pisano, director; Gas Station – Olga Torrico, director; Il gioco – Alessandro Haber, director; Shero – Claudio Casale, director
**Best Foreign Film**: **1917 – Sam Mendes, director**‡; Jojo Rabbit – Taika Waititi; Les Misérables – Ladj Ly, director; Richard Jewell – Clint Eastwood, director; Sorry We Missed You – Ken Loach, director	**David Youth Award**: **18 Presents – Francesco Amato, director**‡; Bad Tales – Damiano and Fabio D'Innocenzo, directors; The Best Years – Gabriele Muccino, director; Rose Island – Sydney Sibilia; Tolo Tolo – Luca Medici
**Special David Awards**: **Sandra Milo** (Career Award); **Diego Abatantuono**; **Monica Bellucci** (Career Award); **Gigi Proietti**	**David Audience Award**: **Tolo Tolo for garnering 6,674,622 spectators**

== Films with multiple nominations and awards ==
Films that received multiple nominations
Nominations	Film
15	Hidden Away
14	Hammamet
13	Bad Tales
11	Miss Marx
11	Rose Island
6	The Macaluso Sisters
4	Figli
4	The Predators
3	18 Presents
3	The Best Years
3	Thou Shalt Not Hate
3	The Ties
3	Tolo Tolo
2	Everything's Gonna Be Alright
2	If Only
2	The Life Ahead
2	We Still Talk

Films that received multiple awards
Awards	Film
7	Hidden Away
3	Miss Marx
3	Rose Island
2	Tolo Tolo
