= David di Donatello for Best Documentary =

Italian film award

- Country: Italy
- Presented by: Accademia del Cinema Italiano
- First award: 2004
- Currently held by: Più di una vita (2026)
- Website: www.daviddidonatello.it

The David di Donatello for Best Documentary (Italian: David di Donatello per il miglior documentario) is an award presented annually by the Accademia del Cinema Italiano since 2004. It was presented as the David di Donatello for Best Documentary Feature (Italian: David di Donatello per il miglior documentario di lungometraggio) from 2004 to 2015.

== Winners and nominees ==
=== 2000s ===
Year	English title	Original title	Director(s)
2004 (49th)	War	Guerra	Pippo Delbono
2004 (49th)	At School	A scuola	Leonardo Di Costanzo
2004 (49th)	L'esplosione		Giovanni Piperno
2004 (49th)	Padre Pio express		Ilaria Freccia
2004 (49th)	Segni particolari: appunti per un film sull'Emilia-Romagna		Giuseppe Bertolucci
2004 (49th)	L'uomo segreto		Nino Bizzarri
2005 (50th)	A Particular Silence	Un silenzio particolare	Stefano Rulli
2005 (50th)	I dischi del sole		Luca Pastore
2005 (50th)	Traveling With Che Guevara	In viaggio con Che Guevara	Gianni Minà
2005 (50th)	Passaggi di tempo - Il viaggio di Sonos 'e Memoria		Gianfranco Cabiddu
2005 (50th)	I ragazzi della Panaria		Nello Correale
2006 (51st)	Il bravo gatto prende i topi		Francesco Conversano and Nene Grignaffini
2006 (51st)	Excellent Cadavers	In un altro paese	Marco Turco
2006 (51st)	L'isola di Calvino		Roberto Giannarelli
2006 (51st)	Piccolo Sole - Vita e morte di Henri Crolla		Nino Bizzarri
2006 (51st)	Notes from a Kurdish Rebel	Primavera in Kurdistan	Stefano Savona
2006 (51st)	I Only Wanted to Live	Volevo solo vivere	Mimmo Calopresti
2007 (52nd)	My Country	Il mio paese	Daniele Vicari
2007 (52nd)	100 anni della nostra storia		Gianfranco Pannone and Marco Simon Puccioni
2007 (52nd)	Bellissime (seconda parte)		Giovanna Gagliardo
2007 (52nd)	Souvenir Srebrenica		Luca Rosini
2007 (52nd)	The Session Is Open	L'udienza è aperta	Vincenzo Marra
2008 (53rd)	Mothers	Madri	Barbara Cupisti
2008 (53rd)	Centravanti nato		Gianclaudio Guiducci
2008 (53rd)	The Threat	La minaccia	Silvia Luzi and Luca Bellino
2008 (53rd)	Crossing the Line	Il passaggio della linea	Pietro Marcello
2008 (53rd)	We Want Roses Too	Vogliamo anche le rose	Alina Marazzi
2009 (54th)	Rata nece biti (La guerra non ci sarà)		Daniele Gaglianone
2009 (54th)	211: Anna		Giovanna Massimetti and Paolo Serbandini
2009 (54th)	Come un uomo sulla terra		Andrea Segre, Dagmawi Yimer, in collaboration with Riccardo Biadene
2009 (54th)	Diario di un curato di montagna		Stefano Saverioni
2009 (54th)	Non tacere		Fabio Grimaldi

=== 2010s ===
Year	English title	Original title	Director(s)
2010 (55th)	The Mouth of the Wolf	La bocca del lupo	Pietro Marcello
2010 (55th)	Hollywood on the Tiber	Hollywood sul Tevere	Marco Spagnoli
2010 (55th)	L'isola dei sordobimbi		Stefano Cattini
2010 (55th)	The One Man Beatles		Cosimo Messeri
2010 (55th)	Valentina Postika in attesa di partire		Caterina Carone
2011 (56th)	È stato morto un ragazzo		Filippo Vendemmiati
2011 (56th)	L'ultimo Gattopardo: Ritratto di Goffredo Lombardo		Giuseppe Tornatore
2011 (56th)	Ritratto di mio padre		Maria Sole Tognazzi
2011 (56th)	This Is My Land… Hebron		Stephen Natanson and Giulia Amati
2011 (56th)	Ward 54		Monica Maggioni
2012 (57th)	Tahrir: Liberation Square		Stefano Savona
2012 (57th)	The Castle	Il castello	Massimo D'Anolfi and Martina Parenti
2012 (57th)	Leaving King's Bay	Lasciando la baia del re	Claudia Cipriani
2012 (57th)	Pasta nera		Alessandro Piva
2012 (57th)	Polvere – Il grande processo dell'amianto		Niccolò Bruna and Andrea Prandstraller
2012 (57th)	Zavorra		Vincenzo Mineo
2013 (58th)	Anija – La nave		Roland Sejko
2013 (58th)	Bad Weather		Giovanni Giommi
2013 (58th)	Fratelli e sorelle – Storie di carcere		Barbara Cupisti
2013 (58th)	Nadea and Sveta	Nadea e Sveta	Maura Delpero
2013 (58th)	Pezzi		Luca Ferrari
2014 (59th)	Stop the Pounding Heart		Roberto Minervini
2014 (59th)	Dal profondo	From the Depths	Valentina Pedicini
2014 (59th)	Il segreto		Cyop & Kaf
2014 (59th)	In utero Srebrenica		Giuseppe Carrieri
2014 (59th)	The Administrator	L'amministratore	Vincenzo Marra
2014 (59th)	Sacro GRA		Gianfranco Rosi
2015 (60th)	Belluscone: A Sicilian Story	Belluscone – Una storia siciliana	Franco Maresco
2015 (60th)	Enrico Lucherini – Ne ho fatte di tutti i colori		Marco Spagnoli
2015 (60th)	On the Bride's Side	Io sto con la sposa	Antonio Augugliaro, Gabriele Del Grande, Khaled Soliman Al Nassiry
2015 (60th)	Quando c'era Berlinguer		Walter Veltroni
2015 (60th)	Sul vulcano		Gianfranco Pannone
2016 (61st)	S Is for Stanley	S Is for Stanley – Trent'anni dietro al volante per Stanley Kubrick	Alex Infascelli
2016 (61st)	I bambini sanno		Walter Veltroni
2016 (61st)	Harry's Bar		Carlotta Cerquetti
2016 (61st)	The Other Side	Louisiana (The Other Side)	Roberto Minervini
2016 (61st)	Revelstoke: A Kiss in the Wind	Revelstoke – Un bacio nel vento	Nicola Moruzzi
2017 (62nd)	Crazy for Football		Volfango De Biasi
2017 (62nd)	60 – Ieri, oggi, domani		Giorgio Treves
2017 (62nd)	Water and Sugar: Carlo Di Palma, the Colours of Life	Acqua e zucchero – Carlo Di Palma, i colori della vita	Fariborz Kamkari
2017 (62nd)	Libera Nos	Liberami	Federica Di Giacomo
2017 (62nd)	Magic Island		Marco Amenta
2018 (63rd)	Marco Ferreri: Dangerous but Necessary	La lucida follia di Marco Ferreri	Anselma Dell'Olio
2018 (63rd)	78: The Getaway	'78 – Vai piano ma vinci	Alice Filippi
2018 (63rd)	Evviva Giuseppe		Stefano Consiglio
2018 (63rd)	Saro		Enrico Maria Artale
2018 (63rd)	The Italian Jobs: Paramount Pictures e l'Italia		Marco Spagnoli
2019 (64th)	Santiago, Italia		Nanni Moretti
2019 (64th)	Arrivederci Saigon		Wilma Labate
2019 (64th)	Friedkin Uncut		Francesco Zippel
2019 (64th)	Julian Schnabel: A Private Portrait	L'arte viva di Julian Schnabel	Pappi Corsicato
2019 (64th)	Samouni Road	La strada dei Samouni	Stefano Savona

=== 2020s ===
Year	English title	Original title	Director(s)
2020 (65th)	Selfie		Agostino Ferrente
2020 (65th)	Citizen Rosi		Didi Gnocchi and Carolina Rosi
2020 (65th)	Fellini Never-Ending	Fellini fine mai	Eugenio Cappuccio
2020 (65th)	The Mafia Is No Longer What It Used to Be	La mafia non è più quella di una volta	Franco Maresco
2020 (65th)	No Filters. The Unconventional Cinema of Claudio Caligari	Se c'è un aldilà sono fottuto - Vita e cinema di Claudio Caligari	Simone Isola e Fausto Trombetta
2021 (66th)	My Name Is Francesco Totti	Mi chiamo Francesco Totti	Alex Infascelli
2021 (66th)	Faith		Valentina Pedicini
2021 (66th)	Notturno		Gianfranco Rosi
2021 (66th)	Sacred Point	Punta Sacra	Francesca Mazzoleni
2021 (66th)	The Rossellinis		Alessandro Rossellini
2022 (67th)	Ennio		Giuseppe Tornatore
2022 (67th)	Atlantide		Yuri Ancarani
2022 (67th)	Futura		Alice Rohrwacher, Francesco Munzi and Pietro Marcello
2022 (67th)	Marx Can Wait	Marx può aspettare	Marco Bellocchio
2022 (67th)	Onde Radicali		Gianfranco Pannone
2023 (68th)	The Circle	Il cerchio	Sophie Chiarello
2023 (68th)	In Viaggio: The Travels of Pope Francis		Gianfranco Rosi
2023 (68th)	Kill Me If You Can		Alex Infascelli
2023 (68th)	The Crown Shyness	La timidezza delle chiome	Valentina Bertani
2023 (68th)	Svegliami a mezzanotte		Francesco Patierno
2024 (69th)	Massimo Troisi: Somebody Down There Likes Me	Laggiù qualcuno mi ama	Mario Martone
2024 (69th)	Enzo Jannacci – Vengo anch'io		Giorgio Verdelli
2024 (69th)	Io, noi e Gaber		Riccardo Milani
2024 (69th)	Walls	Mur	Kasia Smutniak
2024 (69th)	Roma, santa e dannata		Roberto D'Agostino, Marco Giusti, Daniele Ciprì
2025 (70th)
2025 (70th)	Lirica Ucraina		Francesca Mannocchi
2025 (70th)	Duse, The Greatest		Sonia Bergamasco
2025 (70th)	The Secret Drawer	Il cassetto segreto	Costanza Quatriglio
2025 (70th)	The Eye of the Hen	L'occhio della gallina	Antonietta De Lillo
2025 (70th)	Prima della fine. Gli ultimi giorni di Enrico Berlinguer		Samuele Rossi
2026 (71st)
2026 (71st)	Più di una vita		Roberto Rossellini
2026 (71st)	Bobò		Pippo Delbono
2026 (71st)	Ferdinando Scianna - Il fotografo dell'ombra		Roberto Andò
2026 (71st)	Below the Clouds	Sotto le nuvole	Gianfranco Rosi
2026 (71st)	Toni, mio padre		Anna Negri

== See also ==
- Academy Award for Best Documentary Feature Film
- BAFTA Award for Best Documentary
- César Award for Best Documentary Film
- European Film Award for Best Documentary
- Goya Award for Best Documentary
- Lumière Award for Best Documentary
