= David di Donatello for Best Make-up =

Italian film award

- Country: Italy
- Presented by: Accademia del Cinema Italiano
- First award: 2008
- Currently held by: Esmé Sciaroni for The Tasters (2026)
- Website: www.daviddidonatello.it

The David di Donatello for Best Make-up (Italian: David di Donatello per il miglior trucco) is an award presented annually by the Accademia del Cinema Italiano since 2008. It was presented as the David di Donatello for Best Make-up Artist (Italian: David di Donatello per il miglior truccatore) from 2008 to 2021.

== Winners and nominees ==
=== 2000s ===
Year	English title	Original title	Make-up artist(s)
2008 (53rd)	I Viceré		Gino Tamagnini
2008 (53rd)	Come tu mi vuoi		Martinas Cossu
2008 (53rd)	Days and Clouds	Giorni e nuvole	Esmé Sciaroni
2008 (53rd)	The Girl by the Lake	La ragazza del lago	Fernanda Perez
2008 (53rd)	Quiet Chaos	Caos calmo	Gianfranco Mecacci
2009 (54th)	Il divo		Vittorio Sodano
2009 (54th)	Caravaggio		Alessandro Bertolazzi
2009 (54th)	The Demons of St. Petersberg	I demoni di San Pietroburgo	Luigi Rocchetti
2009 (54th)	The Ladies Get Their Say	Due partite	Vincenzo Mastrantonio
2009 (54th)	Wild Blood	Sanguepazzo	Enrico Iacoponi

=== 2010s ===
Year	English title	Original title	Make-up artist(s)
2010 (55th)	Vincere		Franco Corridoni
2010 (55th)	Baarìa		Gino Zamprioli
2010 (55th)	The First Beautiful Thing	La prima cosa bella	Paola Gattabrusi
2010 (55th)	The Man Who Will Come	L'uomo che verrà	Amel Ben Soltane
2010 (55th)	Mi ricordo Anna Frank		Luigi Rocchetti and Erzsébet Forgács
2011 (56th)	We Believed	Noi credevamo	Vittorio Sodano
2011 (56th)	Amici miei – Come tutto ebbe inizio		Vincenzo Mastrantonio
2011 (56th)	Angel of Evil	Vallanzasca - Gli angeli del male	Francesco Nardi and Matteo Silvi
2011 (56th)	Gorbaciof		Lorella De Rossi
2011 (56th)	La passione		Gianfranco Mecacci
2012 (57th)	This Must Be the Place		Luisa Abel
2012 (57th)	ACAB – All Cops Are Bastards		Manlio Rocchetti
2012 (57th)	Kryptonite!	La kryptonite nella borsa	Maurizio Fazzini
2012 (57th)	Magnificent Presence	Magnifica presenza	Ermanno Spera
2012 (57th)	Piazza Fontana: The Italian Conspiracy	Romanzo di una strage	Enrico Iacoponi
2013 (58th)	Reality		Dalia Colli
2013 (58th)	The Best Offer	La migliore offerta	Luigi Rocchetti
2013 (58th)	Diaz – Don't Clean Up This Blood		Mario Michisanti
2013 (58th)	Long Live Freedom	Viva la libertà	Enrico Iacoponi
2013 (58th)	Siberian Education	Educazione siberiana	Enrico Iacoponi and Maurizio Nardi
2014 (59th)	The Great Beauty	La grande bellezza	Maurizio Silvi
2014 (59th)	Fasten Your Seatbelts	Allacciate le cinture	Ermanno Spera
2014 (59th)	Human Capital	Il capitale umano	Caroline Phillipponnat
2014 (59th)	The Mafia Kills Only in Summer	La mafia uccide solo d'estate	Dalia Colli
2014 (59th)	Those Happy Years	Anni felici	Paola Gattabrusi
2015 (60th)	Leopardi	Il giovane favoloso	Maurizio Silvi
2015 (60th)	Black Souls	Anime nere	Sonia Maione
2015 (60th)	The Invisible Boy	Il ragazzo invisibile	Maurizio Fazzini
2015 (60th)	Latin Lover		Ermanno Spera
2015 (60th)	Mia madre		Enrico Iacoponi
2016 (61st)	Tale of Tales	Il racconto dei racconti - Tale of Tales	Gino Tamagnini, Valter Casotto and Luigi D'Andrea
2016 (61st)	They Call Me Jeeg	Lo chiamavano Jeeg Robot	Giulio Pezza
2016 (61st)	The Correspondence	La corrispondenza	Enrico Iacoponi
2016 (61st)	Don't Be Bad	Non essere cattivo	Lidia Minì
2016 (61st)	Youth	Youth - La giovinezza	Maurizio Silvi
2017 (62nd)	Italian Race	Veloce come il vento	Luca Mazzoccoli
2017 (62nd)	At War with Love	In guerra per amore	Maurizio Fazzini
2017 (62nd)	Indivisible	Indivisibili	Valentina Iannuccili
2017 (62nd)	Like Crazy	La pazza gioia	Esme Sciaroni
2017 (62nd)	The Stuff of Dreams	La stoffa dei sogni	Silvia Beltrani
2017 (62nd)	Sweet Dreams	Fai bei sogni	Gino Tamagnini
2018 (63rd)	Nico, 1988		Marco Altieri
2018 (63rd)	Bloody Richard	Riccardo va all'inferno	Luigi Ciminelli, Emanuele De Luca, Valentina Iannuccilli
2018 (63rd)	Fortunata		Maurizio Fazzini
2018 (63rd)	Love and Bullets	Ammore e malavita	Veronica Luongo
2018 (63rd)	Naples in Veils	Napoli velata	Roberto Pastore
2018 (63rd)	Ugly Nasty People	Brutti e cattivi	Frédérique Foglia
2019 (64th)	Dogman		Dalia Colli and Lorenzo Tamburini
2019 (64th)	Call Me by Your Name	Chiamami col tuo nome	Fernanda Perez
2019 (64th)	Capri-Revolution		Alessandro D'Anna
2019 (64th)	Loro		Maurizio Silvi
2019 (64th)	On My Skin	Sulla mia pelle	Roberto Pastore

=== 2020s ===
Year	English title	Original title	Make-up artist(s)
2020 (65th)	Pinocchio		Dalia Colli and Mark Coulier
2020 (65th)	5 Is the Perfect Number	5 è il numero perfetto	Andreina Becagli
2020 (65th)	The First King: Birth of an Empire	Il primo re	Roberto Pastore, Andrea Leanza, Valentina Visintin, Lorenzo Tamburini
2020 (65th)	Suspiria		Fernanda Perez
2020 (65th)	The Traitor	Il traditore	Dalia Colli, Lorenzo Tamburini
2021 (66th)	Hammamet		Luigi Ciminelli, Andrea Leanza and Federica Castelli
2021 (66th)	Hidden Away	Volevo nascondermi	Giuseppe Desiato and Lorenzo Tamburini
2021 (66th)	The Macaluso Sisters	Le sorelle Macaluso	Valentina Iannuccilli
2021 (66th)	Miss Marx		Diego Prestopino
2021 (66th)	Rose Island	L'incredibile storia dell'Isola delle Rose	Luigi Rocchetti
2022 (67th)	Freaks Out		Diego Prestopino, Emanuele De Luca and Davide De Luca
2022 (67th)	Diabolik		Francesca Lodoli
2022 (67th)	I fratelli De Filippo		Maurizio Nardi
2022 (67th)	The Hand of God	È stata la mano di Dio	Vincenzo Mastrantonio
2022 (67th)	The King of Laughter		Alessandro D'Anna
2023 (68th)	Exterior Night	Esterno notte	Enrico Iacoponi
2023 (68th)	Caravaggio's Shadow	L'ombra di Caravaggio	Luigi Rocchetti
2023 (68th)	Dante		Federico Laurenti and Lorenzo Tamburini
2023 (68th)	The Hummingbird	Il colibrì	Paola Gattabrusi and Lorenzo Tamburini
2023 (68th)	Lord of the Ants	Il signore delle formiche	Esmé Sciaroni
2024 (69th)	Kidnapped	Rapito	Enrico Iacoponi
2024 (69th)	Adagio		Antonello Resch, Lorenzo Tamburini, Michele Salgaro Vaccaro and Francesca Galafassi
2024 (69th)	Comandante		Paola Gattabrusi and Lorenzo Tamburini
2024 (69th)	Io capitano		Dalia Colli and Roberta Martorina
2024 (69th)	There's Still Tomorrow	C'è ancora domani	Ermanno Spera
2025 (70th)	The Flood	Le Déluge	Alessandra Vita and Valentina Visintin
2025 (70th)	The Great Ambition	Berlinguer - La grande ambizione	Sara Morlando, Rossella Sicignano, Leonardo Cruciano and Viola Moneta
2025 (70th)	The Art of Joy	L'arte della gioia	Maurizio Fazzini
2025 (70th)	Parthenope		Paola Gattabrusi and Lorenzo Tamburini
2025 (70th)	Vermiglio		Frédérique Foglia
2026 (71st)	The Tasters	Le assaggiatrici	Esmé Sciaroni
2026 (71st)	Duse		Maurizio Fazzini
2026 (71st)	La grazia		Paola Gattabrusi
2026 (71st)	Primavera		Vincenzo Mastrantonio, Adele Di Trani and Emanuele De Luca
2026 (71st)	Queer		Frédérique Foglia

== See also ==
- Academy Award for Best Makeup and Hairstyling
- BAFTA Award for Best Makeup and Hair
- Czech Lion Award for Best Makeup and Hairstyling
- European Film Award for Best Makeup and Hairstyling
- Guldbagge Award for Best Makeup and Hair
- Robert Award for Best Makeup
