= What You Gonna Do When the World's on Fire? =

2018 documentary film

- Promotional poster
- Directed by: Roberto Minervini
- Written by: Roberto Minervini
- Produced by: Paolo Benzi; Roberto Minervini; Denise Ping Lee
- Cinematography: Diego Romero
- Edited by: Marie-Hélène Dozo
- Production companies: Okta Film; Pulpa Entertainment; Shellac Sud; Rai Cinema
- Distributed by: Fondazione Cineteca di Bologna (Italy); Shellac Distribution (France); Kimstim Films (United States)
- Release date: 2 September 2018 (Venice)
- Running time: 123 minutes
- Countries: Italy; France; United States
- Language: English

What You Gonna Do When the World's on Fire? is a 2018 documentary film written and directed by Roberto Minervini, in his third documentary about the marginalized population of the Southern United States. It chronicles the lives of the Black American communities in New Orleans, shortly after the racially motivated killings in 2017.

The film had its world premiere at the main competition of the 75th Venice International Film Festival on 2 September 2018, where it was nominated for the Golden Lion.

== Cast ==
- Judy Hill
- Dorothy Hill
- Michael Nelson
- Ronaldo King
- Titus Turner
- Ashlei King
- Kevin Goodman

== Production ==
An Italian-French-American production, it's the third entry in Minervini's informal trilogy about the marginalized population of the Southern United States, following Stop the Pounding Heart (2013) and The Other Side (2015).

== See also ==
- List of black films of the 2010s
