= Pedicini =

Pedicini is an Italian surname. Notable people with the surname include:

- Piernicola Pedicini (born 1969), Italian politician
- Roberto Pedicini (born 1962), Italian actor and voice actor
- Valentina Pedicini (1978–2020), Italian screenwriter and film director
