= Daniel Espartaco Sánchez =

Mexican writer (born 1977)

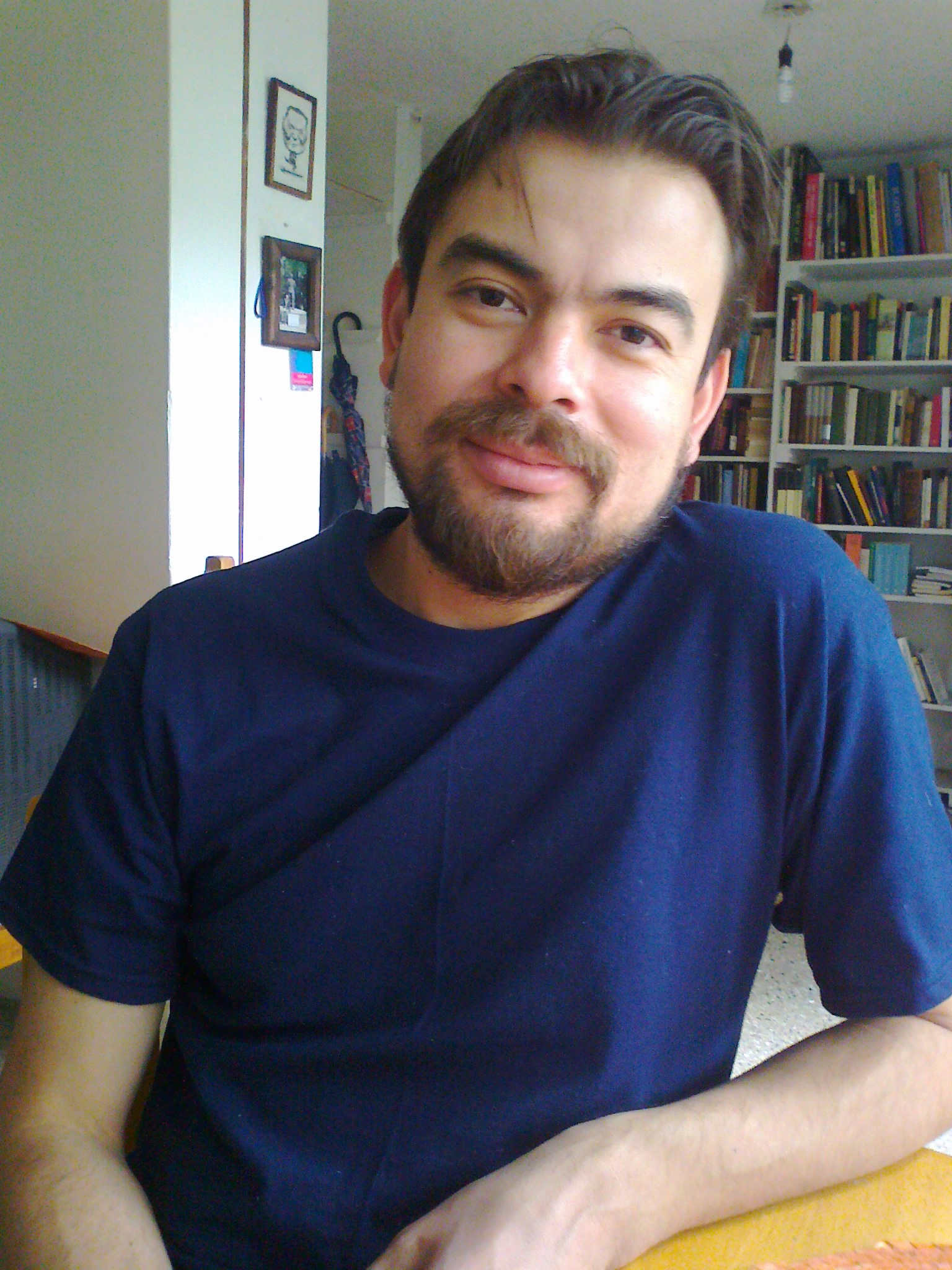
- Born: November 13, 1977 (age 48); Chihuahua, Mexico
- Occupations: novelist, short story writer
- Writing career
- Notable work: Autos usados

Daniel Espartaco Sánchez (Chihuahua, México, 1977) is a Mexican writer. His second issue of short stories, Cosmonauta (Cosmonaut - FETA, 2011) and his first novel, Autos usados (Used cars - Random House Mondadori, 2012) appeared in the "best book of the year" lists (2011 and 2012 respectively) from the Mexican magazine Nexos.

He's been a grant holder of the Fondo Nacional para la Cultura y las Artes (National Fund for Arts and Culture) and has won several national writing awards. In 2012 the American publication Picnic Magazine included him as one of the representative profiles of the contemporary literature in México.

In 2013 his first novel, Autos usados, was awarded with the Colima Prize for fiction (Premio Bellas Artes de Narrativa Colima para Obra Publicada), one of the most importants of Mexico.

== Books ==
- Los nombres de las constelaciones Dharma Books, México, 2021.
- Memorias de un hombre nuevo Literatura Random House, México, 2015.
- Bisontes (Nouvelle). Nitro press. México, 2013.
- Autos usados (Novela). Random House Mondadori. México, 2012.
- Cosmonauta (Relatos). Dirección General de Publicaciones. Fondo Editorial Tierra Adentro. México, 2011.
