= Public Luxury =

2026 studio album by Downtown Boys

Studio album by Downtown Boys
- Released: June 26, 2026
- Studio: Machines With Magnets, Pawtucket, Rhode Island
- Genre: Punk rock
- Length: 34:23
- Label: Sub Pop
- Producer: Joey La Neve DeFrancesco; Seth Manchester

Downtown Boys chronology
Cost of Living (2017)	Public Luxury (2026)

Singles from Public Luxury
- 1. "No Me Jodas" Released: March 23, 2026; 2. "You're a Ghost" Released: April 28, 2026; 3. "Sirena" Released: May 27, 2026; 4. "Yellow Sun" Released: June 26, 2026

Public Luxury is the third studio album by the American punk rock band Downtown Boys. It was released on June 26, 2026, through Sub Pop, nine years after the band's previous studio album, Cost of Living (2017). The album was recorded at Machines With Magnets in Pawtucket, Rhode Island, and was co-produced by guitarist Joey La Neve DeFrancesco and recording engineer Seth Manchester.

Public Luxury received generally positive reviews from critics, with many noting its political writing and cleaner production relative to the band's previous work.

== Background and recording ==
Downtown Boys released Cost of Living, their previous studio album and Sub Pop debut, in 2017. Public Luxury was announced in March 2026 as the band's first studio album in nine years. During the interval, the band contributed compilation tracks, released a cover of a Selena song, and created the score for the 2020 film Miss Marx. The Guardian also noted members' work as public defenders and in music-worker organizing during the same period.

According to the band's Bandcamp page, DeFrancesco composed the music on the album and penned the lyrics to eight of the songs, and Marie contributed lyrics to five songs. The album was recorded at Machines With Magnets, a Pawtucket studio and arts space where Downtown Boys had played early shows. DeFrancesco co-produced the album with Manchester, and Heba Kadry mastered it. Sub Pop's album notes linked the sessions to the death of vocalist Victoria Marie's grandmother in May 2025, whose influence was associated with "No Me Jodas" and "Sirena".

== Music and themes ==
Reviewers characterized Public Luxury as a punk rock and political punk album. Katie Hawthorne of the Guardian described it as bilingual punk with added ambiguity and darker textures, while Matthew Ismael Ruiz of Pitchfork wrote that the album's production was cleaner than on Downtown Boys' previous recordings and allowed the band to use more varied textures. Ruiz pointed to fuzz bass on "Sirena", industrial synthesizer on "You're a Ghost", and the reworking of Malportado Kids' "Mi Concha" as examples of the album's broader arrangements. Steve Erickson of Gay City News wrote that Victoria Marie's movement between English and Spanish had political force and compared the band's saxophone-led sound to earlier punk and new wave groups.

Critics also discussed the album's political and personal subjects. Pitchfork wrote that the lyrics reference Mexican rancheras on "Sirena", climate change and deforestation on "No Me Jodas", and the treatment of pro-Palestine and anti-ICE protesters on "You're a Ghost". Hawthorne associated "You're a Ghost" with state surveillance and described "Yellow Sun" as joining protest language with tenderness. The band told The Line of Best Fit that "Yellow Sun" is a song for Lebanon with lyrics inspired by Etel Adnan's poetry. Sub Pop's notes described "Sirena" as inspired by the Los Dandys song "Gema", one of Marie's late grandmother's favorite songs.

== Release and promotion ==
Sub Pop announced Public Luxury on March 23, 2026, and released "No Me Jodas" as its lead single that day with a John MacKay-directed video. "You're a Ghost" followed on April 28, accompanied by an animated video directed by Khalil. "Sirena" was released on May 27 with a Sarah Elawad-directed video. On June 26, Sub Pop issued Public Luxury worldwide on CD, LP, and digital formats and released a Romy Matar-directed video for "Yellow Sun", which the label identified as one of the album's singles.

== Critical reception ==
Professional ratings
Review scores
Source	Rating
AllMusic	4/5 stars
Distorted Sound	8/10
God Is in the TV	9/10
The Guardian	4/5 stars
Pitchfork	7.6/10
The Skinny	4/5 stars

Public Luxury received generally positive reviews from music critics.

Ruiz wrote in Pitchfork that the album kept the spirit of Downtown Boys' earlier music while making the arrangements more polished and textural. Hawthorne, writing for the Guardian, regarded Public Luxury as the strongest of the band's three albums and highlighted its combination of direct political songs with quieter material such as "Yellow Sun". Elliot Burr of Treble discussed the album's political focus through its Latin-groove punk sound and the contrast between upbeat playing and bleak depictions of American life.

Trev Elkin of God Is in the TV gave the album 9/10 and wrote that it widened the band's political punk through Latin rhythms, drum machines, and songs shaped by grief and homecoming. Jo Cosgrove of Distorted Sound gave the album 8/10 and wrote that the band used the album to reflect social and environmental damage and keep listeners from looking away. Mark Deming of AllMusic wrote that the album kept the band's focus on social, political, and economic justice while using harder arrangements, more keyboards, and more dance-music elements. Andrew Williams of the Skinny gave the album four stars out of five, calling the writing unashamedly political and describing "Yellow Sun" as one of its softer moments. Williams wrote that the album's range gave it a slightly fractured feel but also made it sound fresh. Erickson of Gay City News singled out the band's vocals, saxophone, and keyboard textures, and described the record as a continuation of the band's mix of punk and dance music.

== Track listing ==
Track listing and lengths are adapted from Bandcamp.

Public Luxury track listing
No.	Title	Length
1.	"No Me Jodas"	3:37
2.	"The City Begins"	2:46
3.	"Sirena"	3:29
4.	"Yellow Sun"	3:49
5.	"Viva La Rosa"	3:52
6.	"Enemy Without"	1:37
7.	"You're a Ghost"	3:25
8.	"Albuterol"	3:36
9.	"Mi Concha"	1:57
10.	"Public Works"	4:10
11.	"Public Luxury"	2:05
Total length:		34:23

== Personnel ==
Personnel is adapted from Sub Pop's album page, release notes, and Tidal.

=== Downtown Boys ===
- Victoria Marie – vocals
- Joey La Neve DeFrancesco – guitar, drums, programming, synthesizer, background vocals, production
- Joe DeGeorge – saxophone, synthesizer
- Mary Jane Regalado – bass guitar, background vocals
- Joey Doubek – drums, percussion

=== Technical ===
- Seth Manchester – production, engineering
- Heba Kadry – mastering
- Jacob Clements – mastering assistance
- Haitham Haddad – artwork
- Kara Stokowski – photography, portraits
- Laupita Caideron – photography
- Naomi Yang – photography
