= The Damned (2024 Minervini film) =

2024 film directed by Roberto Minervini

- Italian theatrical release poster
- Italian: I Dannati
- Directed by: Roberto Minervini
- Screenplay by: Roberto Minervini
- Produced by: Paolo Benzi; Denise Ping Lee; Roberto Minervini; Paolo Del Brocco
- Starring: René W. Solomon; Jeremiah Knupp; Noah Carlson; Tim Carlson
- Cinematography: Carlos Alfonso Corral
- Edited by: Marie-Hélène Dozo
- Music by: Carlos Alfonso Corral
- Production companies: Okta Film; Pupa Film; Michigan Films; Rai Cinema; BeTV; Moonduckling Films
- Release dates: 16 May 2024 (Cannes); 16 May 2024 (Italy)
- Running time: 88 minutes
- Countries: Italy; United States; Belgium; France; Canada
- Language: English

The Damned (Italian: I Dannati) is a 2024 drama film produced, written and directed by Roberto Minervini. Starring a large amateur cast, it follows a group of volunteer Union soldiers in 1862 during the American Civil War, in an isolated unknown location. Most of the dialogue were improvised by the cast during the shooting on location in Montana.

The film had its world premiere at the Un Certain Regard section of the 2024 Cannes Film Festival on 16 May, where it won the Best Director award, and it was theatrically released in Italy on the same day by Lucky Red.

== Plot ==
A group of Union volunteers, mostly young men, arrived in the Western territories during the Civil War in 1862. They were a collection of individuals with varying backgrounds and motivations rather than experienced soldiers. They came from different places for various reasons: some joined alongside their brothers, others sought a sense of purpose, and some joined out of perceived duty to the Union.

Their mission is vague, mostly involving patrolling and securing the vast, empty landscape. This quickly erodes their initial enthusiasm, and they begin to question their choices. There's a lot of walking, setting up camps, and trying to stay warm in the brutal winter conditions. They carry rifles but are mostly on guard against the elements and the psychological toll that sets in.

As the days and weeks pass, the soldiers' inner struggles become more apparent. They discuss their families, their lives before the war, and their growing doubts about the conflict itself. They debate the meaning of family versus country and whether the war is just. The reasons why they joined begin to seem insignificant in the face of the war’s realities. Their initial patriotic fervor is replaced with a sense of disorientation and a growing feeling of being lost. The conversations and interactions between the men reveal their vulnerabilities and existential angst. They start to grapple with the moral compromises inherent in war, and the senseless violence they might be forced to inflict. Their faith is tested, and the purpose of their sacrifices is continually debated, leaving the men with more questions than answers.

There is a chaotic and sudden shootout. It's not a glorious battle, but rather a confusing and brutal encounter where it’s not clear who is the aggressor. This moment serves as a turning point. It is a reminder of the harsh reality they are in and the possibility of death. Some of their own men are lost, creating a sense of despair among the remaining soldiers. After the encounter, the soldiers descend further into disillusionment. The war begins to seem meaningless and the hope of going home becomes a distant dream. The landscape, once vast and perhaps even beautiful, now feels menacing and unforgiving. Their patrols become aimless wanderings. They question whether there is value in fighting. The lines between their loyalties and their faith begin to blur, and the men appear lost and hopeless.

== Cast ==
- René W. Solomon as Scout
- Jeremiah Knupp as Scout
- Noah Carlson as Scout
- Tim Carlson as Sergeant
- Cuyler Ballenger as Scout

== Production ==
Although director Minervini was born in Italy and lives in New York City, he resided in Texas for a decade and created a number of films about the region that blur the lines between documentary and narrative filmmaking. The Damned serves as Minervini's first traditional narrative feature.

Minervini began developing The Damned in 2020. He travelled to Helena, Montana the following year and spoke to members of the National Guard about participating in the film. He also involved previous collaborators such as Tim Carson.

The cast and crew established a campground in Montana and allowed locals to come and go to be a part of the film. The team worked without a script and shot in chronological order.

== Release ==
The Damned premiered on 16 May 2024 in the Un Certain Regard section of the 2024 Cannes Film Festival. It has also been selected for the MAMI Mumbai Film Festival 2024 as part of the World Cinema section.

== Reception ==
=== Critical reception ===
On the review aggregator website Rotten Tomatoes, 71% of 14 critics' reviews are positive, with an average rating of 6.4/10. Metacritic, which uses a weighted average, assigned the film a score of 63 out of 100, based on 5 critics, indicating "generally favorable" reviews.

Film critic Carlo Valeri on Sentieri Selvaggi described it as "an ambitious counter-history of the United States carried out by the Italian director all along," while Elisa Battistini on Quinlan points out that it is "a work that with great brilliance deals with war and its absurdity." Gian Luca Pisacane on Cinematografo.it also notes that "Minervini abandons the documentary, but does not lose the political, social gaze that has always characterized him."

=== Accolades ===
Award	Ceremony date	Category	Recipient(s)	Result	Ref.
Cannes Film Festival	24 May 2024	Un Certain Regard	Roberto Minervini	Nominated	
Cannes Film Festival	24 May 2024	Un Certain Regard – Best Director (Note: Shared with Rungano Nyoni for On Becoming a Guinea Fowl.)	Roberto Minervini	Won	
Mediterrane Film Festival	30 June 2024	Main Competition - Best Cinematography	Carlos Alfonso Corral	Won	
