= Full Communism =

Studio album by Downtown Boys
- Released: May 5, 2015
- Studio: Electrical Audio
- Genre: Punk rock
- Length: 25:46
- Label: Don Giovanni
- Producer: Joe Steinhardt

Downtown Boys chronology
| Full Communism (2015) | Cost of Living (2017) |

Full Communism is the debut album by American punk rock band Downtown Boys, released on Don Giovanni Records in 2015.

== Reception ==
Professional ratings
Aggregate scores
| Source | Rating |
|---|---|
| Metacritic | 82/100 |
Review scores
| Source | Rating |
| AllMusic | 4.5/5 stars |
| NME | 9/10 |
| Paste | 8.0/10 |
| Pitchfork | 7.6/10 |
| Punknews.org | 4.5/5 stars |
| Rolling Stone | 3.5/5 stars |
| Vice (Expert Witness) | (1-star Honorable Mention) |

In 2026 Rolling Stone placed it at 95 on their list of The 100 Greatest Punk Albums of All Time.

== Track listing ==
1. "Wave of History"
2. "Santa"
3. "100% Inheritance Tax"
4. "Tall Boys"
5. "Break a Few Eggs"
6. "Monstro"
7. "Desde Arriba"
8. "Future Police"
9. "Traders"
10. "Poder Elegir" (Los Prisioneros cover)
11. "Dancing in the Dark" (Bruce Springsteen cover)
