= Downtown Boys (band) =

American punk rock band

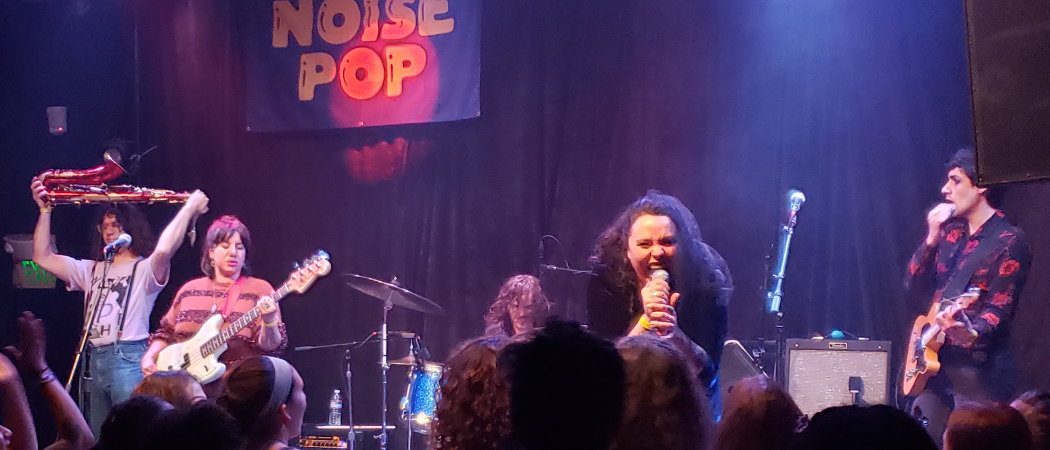
- Downtown Boys performing in May 2019

Background information
- Origin: Providence, Rhode Island, United States
- Genre: Punk rock
- Years active: 2012–present
- Labels: Sub Pop; Don Giovanni; Sister Polygon
- Members: Victoria Ruiz; Joey La Neve DeFrancesco; Mary Regalado; Joe DeGeorge; Joey Doubek
- Past members: Daniel Schleifer; Emmett Fitzgerald; Will Cioffi; Mariel Oliveira; Norlan Olivo

Downtown Boys are an American punk rock band formed in 2011 in Providence, Rhode Island, United States. They have released three studio albums, one EP, and the soundtrack to the film Miss Marx. They have received press coverage in Rolling Stone, The New Yorker and Spin.

== History ==
Downtown Boys formed after former What Cheer? Brigade member Joey La Neve DeFrancesco met vocalist Victoria Ruiz while working at the Renaissance Hotel in Providence, Rhode Island. DeFrancesco famously handed in his letter of resignation from his job there accompanied by his What Cheer? bandmates. The footage of the resignation went viral.

In 2014, the band released a 7" single on Washington D.C.–based Sister Polygon Records to wide acclaim. Downtown Boys released second LP, Full Communism, on Don Giovanni Records on May 5, 2015. The album's lead single, "Monstro", drew critical attention from Pitchfork, Stereogum, and the broader music press. Rachel Brodsky of Spin wrote of the single: "Bravely combating, as their press release reads, 'the prison-industrial complex, racism, queerphobia, capitalism, fascism, boredom, and all things people use to try to close our minds, eyes and hearts,' Downtown Boys do what their finest punk-rock forefathers did before them: challenge long-held ideas."

The group performed on news show Democracy Now! and was interviewed by host Amy Goodman.

Rolling Stone featured the group and dubbed them "America's Most Exciting Punk Band".

The New Yorker described the group's live performances, noting that "[t]he tracks speed by with hardcore kineticism, but Ruiz's lyrics squeeze your hand through the pit: she’s lucid and blunt, shouting down cops, traders, and any other impediment to justice that she can spot. There's something distinctly post-punk about the Boys, ... [i]t could be the saxophone, but it's probably the spirit."

In 2015, Ruiz and DeFrancesco launched the online magazine Spark Mag in collaboration with grassroots advocacy group Demand Progress. The site aims to feature underground and radical artists and connect fans to organizing work.

In 2017, the band played the Coachella Music and Arts festival. They later released an open letter denouncing the festival's business practices and donated "a portion of the money" paid to them by Coachella to the LGBTQ organizations Prysm and FIERCE. That same year, the band helped lead efforts to pressure the SXSW music festival to remove a contract clause threatening to work with Immigration and Customs Enforcement (ICE) to deport foreign artists who violated contract terms. The campaign was successful, and SXSW removed the contract clause. Later that year, the band released their third LP Cost of Living on Sub Pop Records.

In 2020, in light of the COVID-19 pandemic, Downtown Boys contributed to a benefit compilation titled "The Song Is Coming From Inside The House." Organized by indie rock band Strange Ranger, proceeds from the 24-track album went to Groundswell's Rapid Response Fund, to support organizations led by women of color and transgender individuals.

The band composed the original music for the biographical film Miss Marx (2020) by Italian director Susanna Nicchiarelli. Their soundtrack won the David di Donatello award for Best Music, and the Venice Film Festival Soundtrack Stars Award.

In 2020, DeFrancesco founded the musician advocacy organization United Musicians and Allied Workers (UMAW), which has run campaigns around issues such as streaming royalties, increased compensation at the SXSW music festival, musician solidarity with BDS efforts, and more. Other members of the band have also supported the organization.

Controversy (2023):

In November 2023, Victoria Ruiz became the subject of public controversy after being filmed removing posters in New York City depicting Israeli hostages taken during attacks by Hamas. The video circulated widely online and prompted strong condemnation, with some commentators describing the act as insensitive and potentially antisemitic. Ruiz later apologized and resigned from her position at a public defender’s office.

== Discography ==
- Downtown Boys (cass/cd/dl), 2012
- Downtown Boys EP (ltd 7"/dl) Sister Polygon Records, 2014
- Full Communism (cd/lp/dl) Don Giovanni Records, 2015
- Cost of Living Sub Pop Records, 2017
- Miss Marx (Original Motion Picture Soundtrack), Plaza Mayor Company, 2021
- Public Luxury, 2026
