= Lecture 21 =

- Directed by: Alessandro Baricco
- Screenplay by: Alessandro Baricco
- Story by: Alessandro Baricco
- Produced by: Giancarlo Leone; Domenico Procacci
- Starring: John Hurt; Noah Taylor; Leonor Watling; Clive Russell; Rasmus Hardiker
- Cinematography: Gherardo Gossi
- Edited by: Giogiò Franchini
- Music by: Mario Brunello
- Production companies: Fandango; Potboiler Productions; Rai Cinema
- Distributed by: 01 Distribution
- Release date: August 11, 2008 (Locarno Festival)
- Running time: 92 minutes
- Countries: Italy; United Kingdom
- Language: English

Lecture 21 (aka 'Lezione 21' 'Lesson 21') is a 2008 British-Italian film written and directed by Alessandro Baricco and starring John Hurt, Noah Taylor and Leonor Watling. The film is in English.

The film is set in 1824, 1997 and 2007 and tells the tale of a Professor (John Hurt) delivering a lecture about a musician (Noah Taylor) coming to a remote village in the mountains to better understand Beethoven's 9th symphony before he dies. The film is presented as a documentary, as Leonor Watling and her friends recall the lesson, the audience views what happens as though it were real. The lesson is interspersed with documentary-style interviews of a variety of musicians, who provide a secondary narration.

It also features Clive Russell, Matthew T. Reynolds, Daniel Tuite, Andy Gathergood, Rasmus Hardiker, Michael Jibson and Natalia Tena.

It had its North American premiere at the Miami International Film Festival in 2009.

== Reception ==
Kent Turner of Film-Forward.com described it as 'a brisk, irreverent music-history lesson by way of Terry Gilliam'.
