= Discovery at Dawn =

- Film poster
- Italian: La scoperta dell'alba
- Directed by: Susanna Nicchiarelli
- Written by: Susanna Nicchiarelli; Michele Pellegrini
- Produced by: Domenico Procacci
- Starring: Margherita Buy; Susanna Nicchiarelli; Sergio Rubini; Lino Guanciale; Renato Carpentieri; Lina Sastri
- Cinematography: Gherardo Gossi
- Edited by: Stefano Cravero
- Release date: November 2012 (Rome)
- Running time: 90 minutes
- Country: Italy
- Language: Italian

Discovery at Dawn (Italian: La scoperta dell'alba) is a 2012 Italian drama film co-written and directed by Susanna Nicchiarelli. It is loosely based on the novel La scoperta dell'alba by Walter Veltroni.

The film premiered at the 2012 Rome International Film Festival.

== Plot ==
Thirty years after the disappearance of her father, a woman discovers she can make phone calls to her past self.

== Cast ==
- Margherita Buy as Caterina Astengo
- Susanna Nicchiarelli as Barbara Astengo
- Sergio Rubini as Lorenzo
- Lino Guanciale as Marco Tessandori
- Renato Carpentieri as Giovanni Tonini
- Lina Sastri as Marianna Dall'Acqua

== See also ==
- List of Italian films of 2012
