= Atlantide (film) =

2021 film directed by Yuri Ancarani

- Directed by: Yuri Ancarani
- Screenplay by: Yuri Ancarani
- Cinematography: Yuri Ancarani; Mauro Chiarello
- Edited by: Yuri Ancarani; Yves Beloniak
- Music by: Sick Luke; Lorenzo Senni; Francesco Fantini
- Release date: 2021
- Language: Italian

Atlantide ( Italian name for Atlantis) is a 2021 docufiction film written and directed by Yuri Ancarani.

A co-production between Italy, France, United States and Qatar, the film premiered at the 78th edition of the Venice Film Festival, in the Horizons sidebar. It was awarded the Prix Nouvelles Vagues Acuitis at the La Roche-sur-Yon International Film Festival. It was nominated for the David di Donatello for best documentary film.

== Cast ==
- Daniele Barison
- Maila Dabalà
- Bianka Berényi
- Alberto Tedesco
- Jacopo Torcellan
