= Low Tide (2012 film) =

- Directed by: Roberto Minervini
- Screenplay by: Roberto Minervini
- Produced by: Alexis Franco; João Leite; Denise Ping Lee; Luigina Smerilli; Roberto Minervini
- Starring: Daniel Blanchard
- Cinematography: Diego Romero
- Edited by: Marie-Hélène Dozo
- Release date: 2012
- Running time: 92 minutes
- Language: English

Low Tide (Italian: Bassa marea) is a 2012 drama film written and directed by Roberto Minervini. An international co-production between United States, Italy and Belgium, it premiered in the Orizzonti sidebar of the 69th Venice International Film Festival. It is the second chapter in Minervini's Texas Trilogy.

== Cast ==
- Daniel Blanchard as the boy
- Melissa McKinney as the mother
- Vernon Wilbanks as Vernon
- Sid Kelton as the mother's partner
