= Yuri Ancarani =

Italian video artist and filmmaker (born 1972)

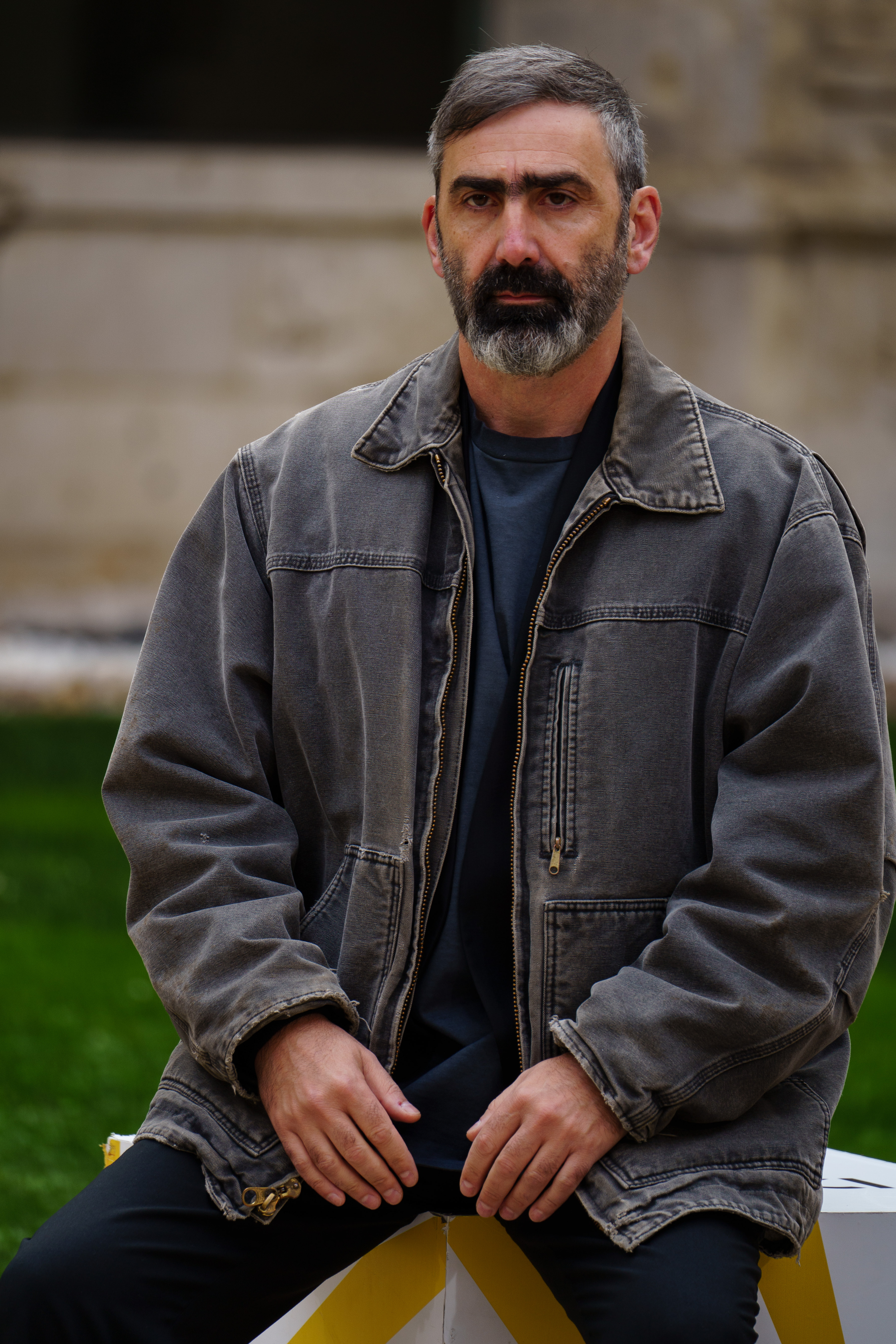
- Ancarani in 2025
- Born: 31 January 1972 (age 54); Ravenna, Italy
- Occupation: Film director

Yuri Ancarani (born 31 January 1972) is an Italian video artist, film director and documentarist.

== Life and career ==
Born in Ravenna, Ancarani graduated from the Nuova Accademia di Belle Arti, and later devoted to video art, first with a series of video installations about Romagna known as 'Ricordi per moderni'. Between 2010 and 2012, he shot three short films collectively known as 'Trilogia sul lavoro' (Trilogy about work); consisting of Il capo, Piattaforma luna and Da Vinci, they premiered at the 67th and 68th Venice Film Festival and at the 7th Rome Film Festival, respectively.

In 2017, Ancarani shot his first feature-length documentary, The Challenge, about a falconer competing in a major tournament in Qatar; the film premiered at the 69th Locarno Film Festival, in which it won the Ciné+ Special Jury Prize. In 2021, his docufiction film Atlantide premiered at the 78th edition of the Venice Film Festival, in the Horizons sidebar, and was nominated for the David di Donatello for best documentary film. In 2023, his documentary Il popolo delle donne was screened at the 80th Venice Film Festival, in the Giornate degli Autori sidebar.
