= Cost of Living (Downtown Boys album) =

Studio album by Downtown Boys
- Released: August 11, 2017
- Length: 34:20
- Label: Sub Pop

Downtown Boys chronology
Full Communism (2015)	Cost of Living (2017)	Public Luxury (2026)

Professional ratings
Aggregate scores
Source	Rating
AnyDecentMusic?	7.6/10
Metacritic	78/100
Review scores
Source	Rating
AllMusic	4/5 stars
The A.V. Club	B+

Cost of Living is the second studio album by American band Downtown Boys. It was released in August 2017 under Sub Pop Records.

== Tracklisting ==
No.	Title	Length
1.	"A Wall"	4:02
2.	"I'm Enough (I Want More)"	3:02
3.	"Somos Chulas (No Somos Pendejas)"	3:23
4.	"Promissory Note"	3:40
5.	"Because You"	3:27
6.	"Violent Complicity"	3:16
7.	"It Can't Wait"	1:59
8.	"Tonta"	1:53
9.	"Heroes (Interlude)"	0:51
10.	"Lips That Bite"	4:05
11.	"Clara Rancia"	3:34
12.	"Bulletproof (Outro)"	1:08
