= Fernanda Pérez =

Colombian swimmer

Personal information
- Born: 30 January 1961 (age 65)

Sport
- Sport: Swimming

Fernanda Pérez (born 30 January 1961) is a Colombian former swimmer. She competed in two events at the 1976 Summer Olympics.
