= Cosmonaut (film) =

- Directed by: Susanna Nicchiarelli
- Written by: Susanna Nicchiarelli; Teresa Ciabatti
- Produced by: Domenico Procacci
- Cinematography: Gherardo Gossi
- Music by: Max Casacci
- Production company: Fandango
- Release date: 11 September 2009 (Italy)
- Running time: 85 minutes
- Country: Italy
- Languages: Italian; Russian

Cosmonaut (Italian: Cosmonauta) is a 2009 Italian coming-of-age film written and directed by Susanna Nicchiarelli. It won the Controcampo Italiano at the 66th Venice International Film Festival. It also won the Ciak d'oro for best first work.

== Plot ==
Cosmonaut follows a young girl named Luciana, who struggles to have her voice heard in a youth communist group dominated by men. She comes up with the platform to mobilize communism in her town by bringing recognition to the Soviet's progress in the space race. As a strong and stubborn female character, she struggles to balance new relationships and her role as her epileptic brother's supervisor.

== Cast ==
- Miriana Raschillà as Luciana Proietti
- Pietro Del Giudice as Arturo Proietti
- Michelangelo Ciminale as Vittorio
- Chiara Arrighi as Fiorella
- Valentino Campitelli as Angelo
- Claudia Pandolfi as Rosalba
- Sergio Rubini as Armando
- Susanna Nicchiarelli as Marisa
- Angelo Orlando as Leonardo

== See also ==
- List of Italian films of 2009
