= Roberto Minervini =

Italian film director

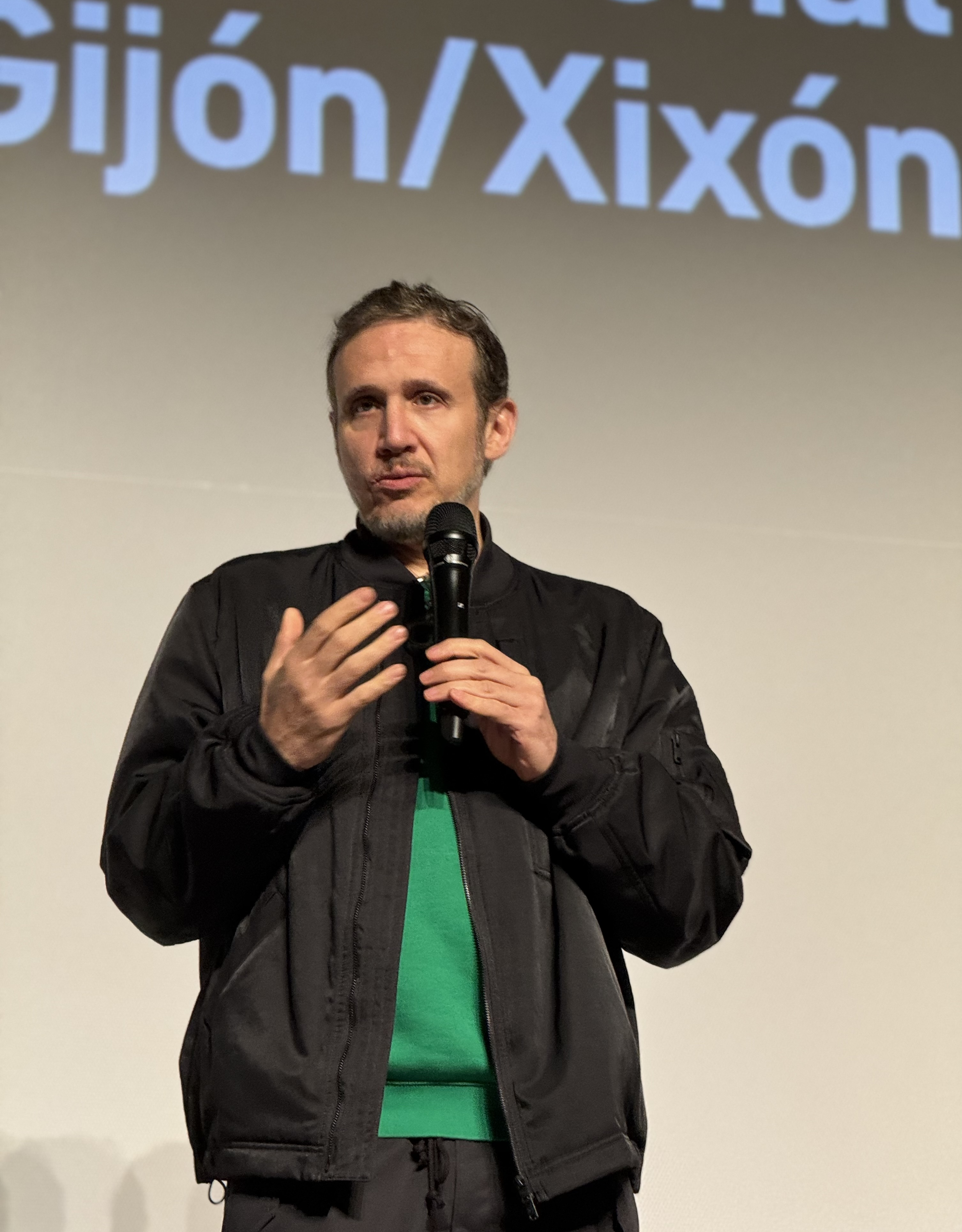
Minervini in 2024

Roberto Minervini (born 1970) is an Italian film director, screenwriter, photographer, and music producer. His recent films, focusing on American rural life and marginalized populations, have been praised for their "disarming directness." Minervini's films are notable for their use of both documentary observation and dramatized elements, sometimes in combination.

His 2018 documentary What You Gonna Do When the World's on Fire? won a number of awards at the 2018 Venice Film Festival, and The Other Side (2015) was shown in the Un Certain Regard section of the 2015 Cannes Film Festival.

== Early life ==
Born in Fermo, Italy, in 1970, Minervini obtained a degree in Economics and Commerce at the University of Ancona and a doctorate in "History of Cinema" at the Autonomous University of Madrid.

He moved to the United States in October 2000, to work as an IT consultant. In 2004, he completed a master's degree in Media studies at the New School University in New York City. From 2006 to 2007, he taught at De La Salle University in Manila, Philippines.

== Career ==
Minervini began writing, directing, and producing films shortly after completing his master's degree at the New School. Prior to producing full-length feature films, he made a number of shorts, including Voodoo Doll, Come to Daddy, Notes, and The Fireflies. 2011's The Passage was a nominee for the Golden Zenith at the Montréal World Film Festival.

Low Tide, his 2012 film, showed at the Venice Film Festival, winning the Christopher D. Smithers Foundation Special Award and garnering a nomination for the Venice Horizons Award. His film Stop the Pounding Heart was included in the Official Selection of the 2013 Cannes Film Festival and has won numerous awards at other festivals, including the David di Donatello Award for Best Documentary.

The Other Side was shown in the Un Certain Regard section of the 2015 Cannes Film Festival 2015. Minervini was part of the Jury of the "Horizons" section at the 71st Venice International Film Festival (2014).

== Filmography ==
- Voodoo Doll (Short Film, 2005)
- Come to Daddy (Short Film, 2005)
- Notes (Short Film, 2005)
- The Fireflies (Short Film, 2006)
- The Passage (2011)
- Low Tide (2012)
- Stop the Pounding Heart (2013)
- The Other Side (2015)
- What You Gonna Do When the World's on Fire? (2018)
- The Damned (2024)

== Awards and recognition ==
Year	Award	Category	Nominated work	Result
2012	Venice Film Festival	Christopher D. Smithers Foundation Special Award	Low Tide	Won
2012	Venice Film Festival	Venice Horizons Award	Low Tide	Nominated
2013	Torino Film Festival	Special Jury Prize	Stop the Pounding Heart	Won
2013	Torino Film Festival	Prize of the City of Torino	Stop the Pounding Heart	Nominated
2015	Cannes Film Festival	Un Certain Regard	The Other Side	Nominated
2015	Cannes Film Festival	Golden Eye	The Other Side	Nominated
2018	Venice Film Festival	Premio Vivere da Sportivi Award	What You Gonna Do When the World's on Fire?	Won
2018	Venice Film Festival	Fair Play Cinema Award	What You Gonna Do When the World's on Fire?	Won
2018	Venice Film Festival	UNICEF Award	What You Gonna Do When the World's on Fire?	Won
2018	Venice Film Festival	Golden Lion	What You Gonna Do When the World's on Fire?	Nominated
2024	Cannes Film Festival	Un Certain Regard	The Damned	Nominated
2024	Cannes Film Festival	Un Certain Regard - Best Director	The Damned	Won (Note: Shared with Rungano Nyoni for On Becoming a Guinea Fowl.)
