= Maurizio Silvi =

Italian make-up artist (1949–2022)

- Born: 15 May 1949; Albano Laziale, Italy
- Died: 24 May 2022 (aged 73); Rome, Italy
- Occupation: Makeup artist
- Years active: 1974–2022

Maurizio Silvi (15 May 1949 – 24 May 2022) was an Italian make-up artist who was nominated in the category of Academy Award for Best Makeup and Hairstyling during the 74th Academy Awards for his work on the film Moulin Rouge! His nomination was shared with Aldo Signoretti.
