= Miss Marx =

2020 biographical period drama film

- Theatrical release poster
- Directed by: Susanna Nicchiarelli
- Written by: Susanna Nicchiarelli
- Produced by: Marta Donzelli; Gregorio Paonessa
- Starring: Romola Garai; Patrick Kennedy
- Cinematography: Crystel Fournier
- Edited by: Stefano Cravero
- Music by: Gatto Ciliegia contro il Grande Freddo; Downtown Boys
- Production companies: Vivo film; Rai Cinema; Tarantula; VOO; BeTV
- Distributed by: 01 Distribution (Italy)
- Release dates: 5 September 2020 (Venice); 17 September 2020 (Italy)
- Running time: 107 minutes
- Countries: Italy; Belgium
- Language: English
- Box office: $625,370

Miss Marx is a 2020 biographical period drama film written and directed by Susanna Nicchiarelli. An English-language co-production between Italy and Belgium, the film stars Romola Garai as Eleanor Marx and Patrick Kennedy as Edward Aveling.

Miss Marx had its world premiere in the main international competition section at the 77th Venice International Film Festival on 5 September 2020. At the festival, Miss Marx received several accolades, including the FEDIC Award for Best Film, the Soundtrack Stars Award for Best Soundtrack, and the La Pellicola d'Oro Award for Best Dressmaker.

== Plot ==
Eleanor Marx, the youngest daughter of Karl Marx, emerges as a prominent figure in the ⁣⁣socialistic⁣⁣ movement in the United Kingdom. A committed activist, she dedicates her life to workers’ rights, women’s emancipation, and the abolition of child labor. In 1883, she meets Edward Aveling, a playwright whose charm masks selfishness and financial irresponsibility. As Edward squanders the inheritance left to Eleanor by Friedrich Engels, he gradually drains her emotional and psychological strength as well.

Despite her advocacy against patriarchal oppression, Eleanor finds herself trapped in a similarly oppressive relationship, unable to reclaim her own happiness. A pivotal moment occurs when Eleanor and Edward perform a scene from Henrik Ibsen’s A Doll's House, portraying the characters Nora and Helmer. The dialogue eerily mirrors Eleanor’s own reality—one shaped and confined by the men closest to her.

By 1898, physically and emotionally exhausted and struggling with opium dependence, Eleanor takes her own life.

== Cast ==
- Romola Garai as Eleanor Marx
- Patrick Kennedy as Edward Aveling
- John Gordon Sinclair as Friedrich Engels
- Felicity Montagu as Helene Demuth
- Karina Fernandez as Olive Schreiner
- Emma Cunniffe as Laura Marx
- George Arrendell as Paul Lafargue
- Célestin Ryelandt as Johnny Longuet
- Oliver Chris as Friedrich 'Freddy' Demuth
- Alexandra Lewis as Aveling's second wife
- Georgina Sadler as Gerty
- Miel van Hasselt as Wilhelm Liebknecht
- Freddy Drabble as Havelock Ellis
- Barney White as Michael
- Stevie Raine as Phillip
- Philip Gröning as Karl Marx

== Production ==
Principal photography began on 18 November 2019 at the Royal Charterhouse in Collegno, Turin.

== Release ==
Miss Marx had its world premiere in the main international competition section at the 77th Venice Film Festival on 5 September 2020. It was subsequently released in Italy by 01 Distribution on 17 September 2020.

== Reception ==
=== Box office ===
Miss Marx grossed a worldwide total of $625,370.

=== Critical reception ===
On the review aggregator website Rotten Tomatoes, Miss Marx holds an approval rating of 46% based on 13 reviews, with an average of 5.5/10.

=== Awards and nominations ===
Award	Date of the ceremony	Category	Recipients	Result	Ref.
David di Donatello Awards	11 May 2021	Best Film	Miss Marx	Nominated	
David di Donatello Awards	11 May 2021	Best Producer	Marta Donzelli, Gregorio Paonessa, Joseph Rouschop and Valérie Bournonville	Won	
David di Donatello Awards	11 May 2021	Best Director	Susanna Nicchiarelli	Nominated	
David di Donatello Awards	11 May 2021	Best Cinematography	Crystel Fournier	Nominated	
David di Donatello Awards	11 May 2021	Best Production Design	Alessandro Vannucci, Igor Gabriel and Fiorella Cicolini	Nominated	
David di Donatello Awards	11 May 2021	Best Score	Gatto Ciliegia Contro II Grande Freddo and Downtown Boys	Won	
David di Donatello Awards	11 May 2021	Best Sound	Adriano Di Lorenzo, Pierpaolo Merafino, Marc Bastien, Pierre Greco and Franco Piscopo	Nominated	
David di Donatello Awards	11 May 2021	Best Costumes	Massimo Cantini Parrini	Won	
David di Donatello Awards	11 May 2021	Best Visual Effects	Massimiliano Battista	Nominated	
David di Donatello Awards	11 May 2021	Best Make-up	Diego Prestopino	Nominated	
David di Donatello Awards	11 May 2021	Best Hairstyling	Domingo Santoro	Nominated	
Globo d'oro	28 February 2021	Italians in the World Award	Miss Marx	Won	
Venice Film Festival	2–12 September 2020	Golden Lion	Miss Marx	Nominated	
Venice Film Festival	2–12 September 2020	FEDIC Award for Best Film	Miss Marx	Won	
Venice Film Festival	2–12 September 2020	Soundtrack Stars Award for Best Soundtrack	Gatto Ciliegia contro il Grande Freddo and Downtown Boys	Won	
Venice Film Festival	2–12 September 2020	La Pellicola d'Oro Award for Best Dressmaker	Paola Seghetti	Won	
