= Emma Dante =

Italian playwright, theatre director, and stage actress

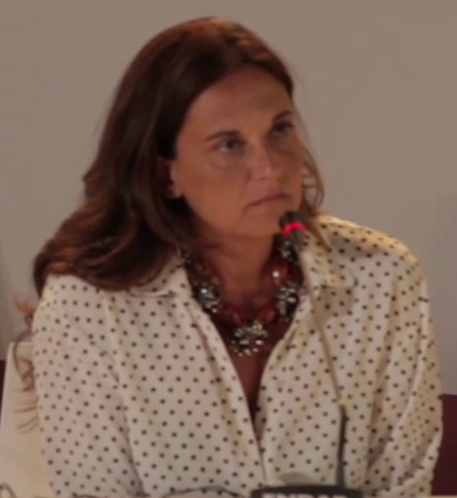
- Dante at the 70th Venice Film Festival (2013)
- Born: 6 April 1967 (age 58); Palermo, Italy
- Occupations: Playwright; theatre director; actress; filmmaker
- Years active: 1990–present

Emma Dante (Italian pronunciation: [ˈɛmma ˈdante]; born 6 April 1967) is an Italian playwright, theatre director and stage actress. She wrote, directed and starred in the 2013 film A Street in Palermo. She later directed numerous operas, including Richard Strauss' Feuersnot and Hans Werner Henze's Gisela! in Palermo, and Carmen at the Teatro alla Scala. In 2020 The Macaluso Sisters, a film she co-wrote and directed based on her own acclaimed play, was entered into the main competition at the 77th Venice International Film Festival. Her third film Misericordia was awarded the Grand Prix for the Best Film at the 27th Tallinn Black Nights Film Festival.
