= Gianfranco Pannone =

Italian film and television director

Gianfranco Pannone is an Italian film and television director.

== Biography ==
After graduating in Cinema history and criticism at La Sapienza University of Rome, he graduated in Directing at the CSC (National Cinema School). Between 1990 and 1998, he directed and produced the documentary films Piccola America, Lettere dall’America and L’America a Roma, which together make up the Trilogy of America; and later Latina/Littoria (2001), a French-Italian documentary-film, which was awarded the prize for the best non-fiction work at the Torino Film Festival in 2001 and in 2003 at the Mediterranean Film Festival – Rai Award. Among his short and medium-length films are Kelibia/Mazara (1998, co-directed with T. Ben Abdallah), Pomodori (1999), Sirena operaia (2000), Viaggio intorno alla mia casa (2001), Venezia, la città che affonda (2001, co-directed with M. Visalberghi), Pietre, miracoli e petrolio, Benvenue chez Casetti (2006). Also the feature film 100 anni della nostra storia (2006, co-directed with Marco Puccioni), made it to the final five of David di Donatello in 2007; the docu-series Cronisti di strada (2007) and, in recent years, the shorts Immota manet (2009), Linee di confine (2010), Aprilia (2011). Le pietre sacre della Basilicata (2012), Graziano e le sue donne (2013) Io che amo solo te (2004) is his fiction feature film . His last documentary films are: Il sol dell’avvenire (2008), which was conceived and written with John Fasanella and was presented as a special event at the International Film Festival of Locarno, at Viennale in 2008, at the International Documentary Film Festival of London and in the final five of Nastri D’Argento in 2009; ma che Storia..., a montage film produced by Cinecittà Luce and presented during the International Venice Film Festival in 2010, as well as in many cities across the world as representative of the 150th anniversary of the Unification of Italy; Scorie in libertà (2011-2012), presented in the International section of Cinemambiente Torino Festival in 2012 and, as a special event, at the Festival del Nuovo Cinema di Pesaro in the same year. The documentary Ebrei a Roma was presented as a Special Event at the Rome International Film Festival in 2012. This year he has completed the medium-length Trit cme la bula and the feature Sul vulcano.

His works have earned him awards, have allowed him to participate in many Italian and international festivals and are aired on major European television. Pannone has also directed several shows as a theatre director, including, Guerra civile in 2006, presented in the same year at the Festival Dei Due Mondi in Spoleto. He is co-founder of Doc/It and he is an active member of the association 100autori.

He teaches documentary filmmaking at Dams in Roma Tre University and documentary direction at CSC – National Cinema School in Rome and in L'Aquila. He has also conducted numerous workshops on documentary writing and directing. He has been editor of the Docdoc column in the online journal ildocumentario.it and he has written several essays and books about cinema, including Il sol dell’avvenire – Diario di un film politicamente scorretto (with Giovanni Fasanella) edited by Chiarelettere, L’officina del documentario (with Mario Balsamo) edited by Cdg, and Docdoc – 10 anni di cinema e altre storie edited by Mephite-Quaderni di Cinemasud. He is responsible for the Open Eyes Section, dedicated to international documentaries, within the Med Film Festival in Rome.

== Filmography ==
- La giostra (cm. di finzione per Csc), 1989
- Lettera da Roma (doc. breve per Csc), 1990
- Piccola America (film doc. lg), 1991
- Bambini a Napoli (doc. breve), 1993
- Lettere dall’America (doc. mm), 1995
- Kenia (doc. cm), 1996
- Ritorno a Littoria (doc. cm), 1997
- Ombre del Sud (doc. antologico), 1997
- Le leggi dimenticate (doc. breve), 1997
- L’America a Roma (film doc. lg), 1998
- Kelibia/Mazara (corto di fiction, in co-regia con Tarek Ben Abdallah), 1998
- Gli ultimi giorni di Ciano (doc. breve), 1998
- Il tempio di Venere e Roma (doc. breve, in co-regia con Antonio Pettinelli), 1999
- Pomodori (doc.mm), 1999
- Così vicini, così lontani (doc. breve, in co-regia con Tarek Ben Abdallah), 1999
- Anna delle saline (doc. breve), 1999
- Viaggio intorno alla mia casa (doc. mm), 2000
- Ferie: gli italiani e le vacanze (doc. breve), 2000
- Sirena operaia (doc. mm), 2000
- Venezia, la città che affonda (doc. mm, in co-regia con Marco Visalberghi), 2001
- Latina/Littoria (film doc. lg), 2001
- Cerimonie: gli italiani, la Chiesa, lo Stato (doc. breve), 2002
- Toscana: lungo il fiume (doc. breve), 2002
- Pietre, miracoli e petrolio (doc. mm), 2004
- Io che amo solo te (film di finzione lg), 2004
- Dal dagherrotipo al digitale (doc. breve), 2005
- Benvenue chez Casetti (doc. seriale per Visages d’Europe), 2006
- 100 anni della nostra storia (film doc. lg, in co-regia con Marco Piccioni), 2006
- Cronisti di strada (doc. in tre puntate), 2007
- Una Questi…one poco privata (doc. breve), 2007
- Il sol dell'avvenire (film doc. lg), 2008
- Immota manet (doc. breve), 2009
- Linee di confine (doc. breve), 2010
- Agnelli, l’America a Torino (doc. mediometraggio), 2010
- ma che Storia... (film doc. lungometraggio), 2010
- Aprilia, 75 anni di vita 150 anni di Storia (doc. breve), 2011
- Scorie in libertà (film doc. lg), 2012
- Ebrei a Roma (doc mm), 2012
- Le pietre sacre della Basilicata (cm), 2012
- Trit ‘me la bula (doc mm), 2013
- Sul vulcano (film lungometraggio), 2014

== Awards ==
- Premio della giuria al Festival del Cinema di Roma, 1993
- Premio Bizarri, 1999
- Premio miglior documentario italiano al Torino Film Festival, 2001
- Premio miglior documentario al Leone d'oro, 2015

== Bibliography ==
Simone Brioni. “Transnationalism and Nostalgia: Gianfranco Pannone’s ‘Trilogy of America’”. Journal of Italian Cinema and Media Studies 4.3 (2016), pp. 403–419.
