= Gherardo Gossi =

Italian cinematographer (born 1958)

- Born: 1958; Turin, Italy
- Occupation: Cinematographer

Gherardo Gossi (born in 1958) is an Italian cinematographer.

Born in Turin, Gossi followed the courses of film history and criticism held by Gianni Rondolino at the University of Turin, even without concluding his studies. He began his professional career as an operator in a local television network, Teleuropa 3, and then founded with Lucia Moisio and Walter Buccino the production company "MDP Cinema e Video", specialized in documentaries and short films. In the troupe of cinematographer Claudio Meloni, he worked in advertising, in some television series and in the film Zen (1987) directed by Gian Vittorio Baldi. He debuted as cinematographer in 1991, in Guido Chiesa's Il caso Martello.

Gossi was nominated for the Nastro d'Argento for best cinematography twice, in 2009 for The Past Is a Foreign Land and Lecture 21 and in 2014 for Come il vento. He was nominated for a David di Donatello in 2012 for the cinematography of Diaz - Don't Clean Up This Blood.

== Selected filmography ==
- Love Burns (1994)
- Johnny the Partisan (2000)
- Maximum Velocity (V-Max) (2002)
- Now or Never (2003)
- Working Slowly (Radio Alice) (2004)
- Texas (2005)
- The Past Is a Foreign Land (2008)
- Lecture 21 (2008)
- Cosmonaut (2009)
- Diaz - Don't Clean Up This Blood (2012)
- Discovery at Dawn (2012)
- A Street in Palermo (2013)
- Like the Wind (2013)
- Banana (2015)
- Sun, Heart, Love (2016)
- La profezia dell'armadillo (2018)
- The Macaluso Sisters (2020)
