= The Macaluso Sisters =

2020 Italian drama film

- Theatrical release poster
- Directed by: Emma Dante
- Written by: Emma Dante; Elena Stancanelli; Giorgio Vasta
- Based on: Le sorelle Macaluso by Emma Dante
- Produced by: Marica Stocchi
- Starring: Viola Pusatieri; Eleonora De Luca; Simona Malato; Susanna Piraino; Serena Barone; Maria Rosaria Alati; Anita Pomario; Donatella Finocchiaro; Ilena Rigano; Alissa Maria Orlando; Laura Giordani; Rosalba Bologna
- Cinematography: Gherardo Gossi
- Edited by: Benni Atria
- Production companies: Rosamont; Minimum Fax Media; Rai Cinema
- Distributed by: Teodora Film
- Release dates: 9 September 2020 (Venice); 10 September 2020 (Italy)
- Running time: 94 minutes
- Country: Italy
- Language: Italian

The Macaluso Sisters (Italian: Le sorelle Macaluso) is a 2020 Italian drama film co-written and directed by Emma Dante, based on her own 2014 play of the same name. It was entered in the main competition at the 77th Venice International Film Festival.

== Plot ==
Following the sudden death of one of them during childhood, the four Macaluso sisters experience trauma and grief in their entire lives.

== Cast ==
- Viola Pusatieri as Antonella Macaluso
- Eleonora De Luca as Maria Macaluso
  - Simona Malato as adult Maria
- Susanna Piraino as Lia Macaluso
  - Serena Barone as adult Lia
  - Maria Rosaria Alati as old Lia
- Anita Pomario as Pinuccia Macaluso
  - Donatella Finocchiaro as adult Pinuccia
  - Ileana Rigano as old Pinuccia
- Alissa Maria Orlando as Katia Macaluso
  - Laura Giordani as adult Katia
  - Rosalba Bologna as old Katia

== Production ==
Principal photography began in March 2019 in Palermo, Sicily.

== Release ==
The film had its world premiere at the 77th Venice International Film Festival on 9 September 2020. It was released in Italy on 10 September 2020 by Teodora Film.

== Reception ==
The Macaluso Sisters has an approval rating of 100% on review aggregator website Rotten Tomatoes, based on 15 reviews, and an average rating of 7.5/10. Metacritic assigned the film a weighted average score of 81 out of 100, based on critics, indicating "universal acclaim".
