= Susanna Nicchiarelli =

Italian director, actress and screenwriter

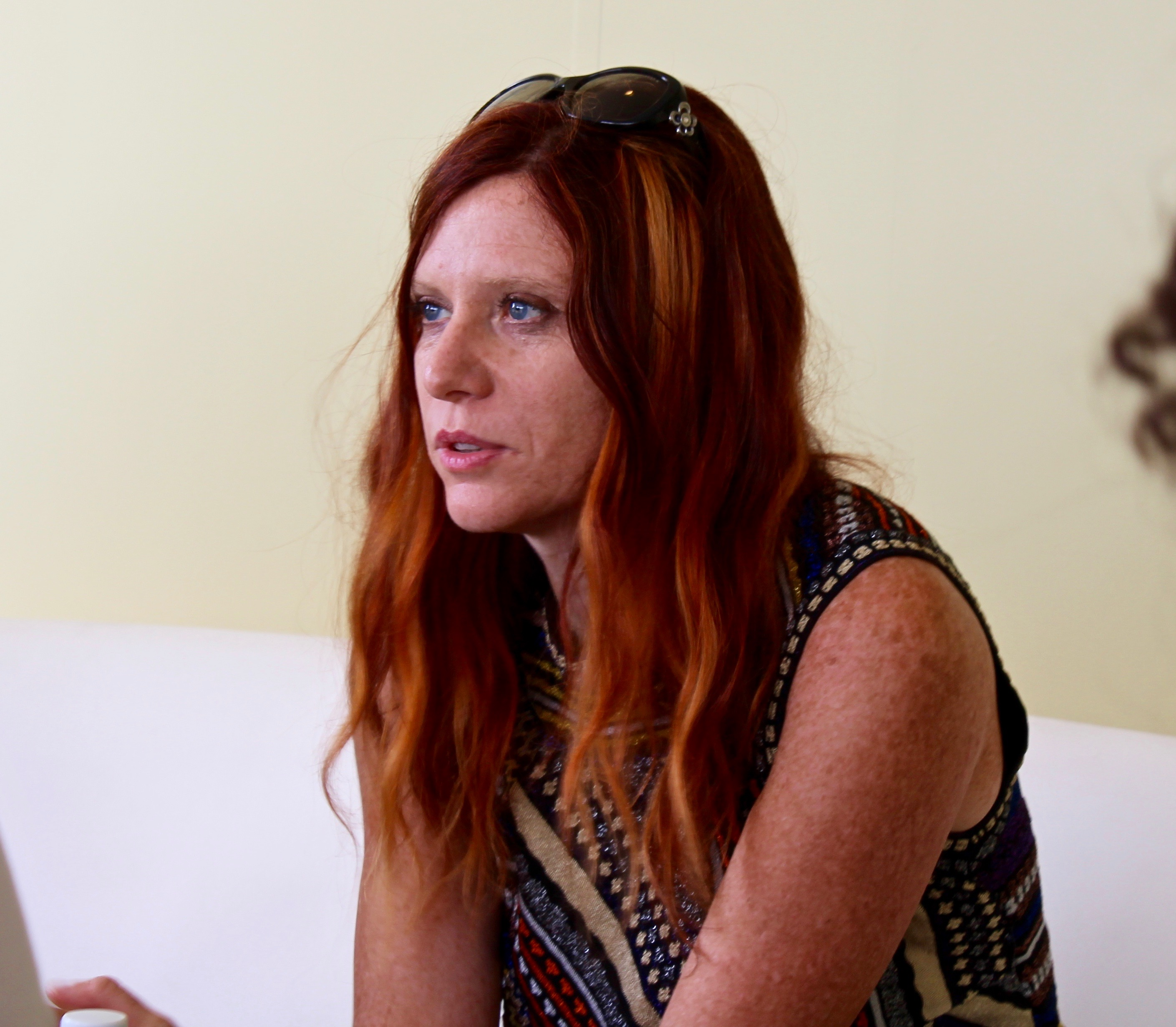
- Nicchiarelli at the 2017 Venice Film Festival
- Born: 6 May 1975 (age 51); Rome, Italy
- Occupations: Director, Actress, Screenwriter
- Years active: 2000–present

Susanna Nicchiarelli (Italian: [suˈzanna nikkjaˈrɛlli]; born 6 May 1975) is an Italian director, actress and screenwriter.

== Biography ==
Nicchiarelli graduated in Philosophy at the Sapienza University in Rome and gained a PhD in Philosophy at the Scuola Normale in Pisa and a Directing degree at the Centro Sperimentale di Cinematografia in 2004.

After having written and directed many short films and documentaries, her first film Cosmonaut was acclaimed at the 2009 Venice Film Festival and gained her a nomination as Best New Director for the David di Donatello Awards and the Nastri d'Argento Awards, while her second film, Discovery at Dawn, based on the book by Walter Veltroni was presented at the 2012 Rome Film Festival.

Her third film, Nico, 1988, a biopic on German singer Nico, was presented at the 2017 Venice Film Festival and was critically acclaimed, gaining four David di Donatello Awards, including the Award for Best Original Screenplay.

== Partial filmography ==
=== Director/screenwriter ===
- Cosmonaut (2009)
- Discovery at Dawn (2012)
- Nico, 1988 (2017)
- Miss Marx (2020)
- Chiara (2022)
- Giorni felici (2026)

=== Actress ===
- Cosmonaut (2009)
- Discovery at Dawn (2012)

== Bibliography ==
- Paradise City, 2025, Mondadori
