= Stop the Pounding Heart =

2013 film

- Festival poster
- Directed by: Roberto Minervini
- Written by: Roberto Minervini; Diego Romero
- Cinematography: Diego Romero
- Edited by: Marie-Hélène Dozo
- Release dates: 18 May 2013 (Cannes); 5 December 2013 (Italy)
- Running time: 100 minutes
- Countries: United States; Italy; Belgium
- Language: English
- Box office: $2,500

Stop the Pounding Heart is a 2013 documentary drama film written and directed by Roberto Minervini. It is a co-production between the United States, Italy and France and had a special screening at the 2013 Cannes Film Festival. It was screened in the Contemporary World Cinema section at the 2013 Toronto International Film Festival.

== Cast ==
- Sara Carlson as Sara
- Colby Trichell as Colby
- Tim Carlson as Himself
- LeeAnne Carlson as Herself
- Katarina Carlson as Herself
- Christin Carlson as Herself
- Grace Carlson as Herself
- Linnea Carlson as Herself
- Emma Carlson as Herself
- Timothy Carlson as Himself
