= The Other Side (2015 film) =

2015 film

- Film poster
- Directed by: Roberto Minervini
- Written by: Roberto Minervini; Denise Ping Lee
- Produced by: Muriel Meynard; Paolo Benzi; Dario Zonta
- Cinematography: Diego Romero Suarez-Llanos
- Edited by: Marie-Hélène Dozo
- Production companies: Agat Films & Cie; Okta Film
- Distributed by: Shellac (France); Lucky Red (Italy)
- Release date: 21 May 2015 (Cannes)
- Running time: 92 minutes
- Countries: France; Italy
- Language: English

The Other Side is a 2015 French-Italian documentary film directed by Roberto Minervini. It was screened in the Un Certain Regard section at the 2015 Cannes Film Festival.

== Premise ==
Roberto Minervini goes to Louisiana, where he documents drug addicts and anti-government militias.

== Reception ==
On review aggregator website Rotten Tomatoes, the film holds an approval rating of 82% based on 22 reviews, and an average rating of 7.5/10. On Metacritic, the film has a weighted average score of 65 out of 100, based on 10 critics, indicating "generally favorable reviews".

Peter Debruge of Variety called it "a soul-draining, feature-length look at the bastard stepchildren of the American Dream". Jordan Mintzer of The Hollywood Reporter called it "a poetic but hermetic journey into a debauched and dangerous Deep South".
