= Valentina Pedicini =

Italian film director (1978–2020)

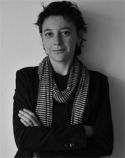
- Born: 6 April 1978; Brindisi, Italy
- Died: 20 November 2020 (aged 42)
- Education: ZeLIG School of Documentary
- Occupations: director, screenwriter
- Years active: 2003–2020

Valentina Zucco Pedicini (Brindisi, 6 April 1978 – Rome, 20 November 2020) was an Italian screenwriter and film director.

She graduated at the ZeLIG International School of Documentary in 2010. Her documentary Dal profondo won the Solinas Award at the 2013 Rome Film Festival and was nominated as Best Documentary at the 2014 David di Donatello; it also received a special mention at the 2014 Nastri d'Argento. Her only full-length fiction movie Dove cadono le ombre premiered at the 74th Venice International Film Festival in the Venice Days (Giornate degli autori) section.

Valentina Pedicini died on 20 November 2020 after a long illness.

== Filmography ==
=== Full-length movies ===
- Dove cadono le ombre (2017)

==== Documentaries ====
- My Marlboro City (2010)
- Dal profondo (2013)
- Faith (2019)

=== Short movies ===
- Mio sovversivo amore (2009)
- Era ieri (2016)
