= Pelicano =

Pelicano is a surname. Notable people with the surname include:

- Isilda Pelicano (born 1949), Portuguese fashion designer
- Jorge Pelicano (born 1977), Portuguese documentary filmmaker and television reporter

== See also ==
- Pelicano Airport, in Chile
