= Giran =

Giran may refer to:

- Giran County, a county in Taiwan
- Giran City, capital of the Taiwanese county of the same name
- Giran (film), an Egyptian film
- Giran (My Hero Academia), a character in the manga series My Hero Academia
