= Perpetual Person =

- Promotional release poster
- Directed by: Javier Bellido Valdivia
- Written by: Javier Bellido Valdivia
- Produced by: Javier Bellido Valdivia
- Cinematography: Javier Bellido Valdivia
- Edited by: Javier Bellido Valdivia
- Production company: Hombre Búho Producciones
- Release date: December 7, 2020 (Doclisboa)
- Running time: 103 minutes
- Country: Peru
- Language: Spanish

Perpetual Person (Spanish: Persona perpetua) is a 2020 Peruvian documentary film written, produced, filmed, edited and directed by Javier Bellido Valdivia. It follows the life and routine of the director's maternal grandmother who has Alzheimer's disease.

== Synopsis ==
An intimate approach to the experience of Alzheimer's disease in a 95-year-old woman and her relationship with her immediate surroundings. The tension between lucidity and dementia will shape a new notion of personhood, able to live and perceive the world in another way.

== Cast ==
- Amadea Cárdenas Cuba
- Nancy Valdivia Cárdenas
- Catalina Zevallos Antahuara
- Anghelo Mancco Hurtado
- Javier Bellido Valdivia

== Release ==
It had its world premiere on December 7, 2020, at the 18th Doclisboa International Film Festival, then was screened in early January 2021 at the 8th Transcinema International Film Festival, on October 11, 2021, at the 8th Trujillo Film Festival, and on November 17, 2021, at the 38th Kasseler Dokfest. On December 10, 2021, at the 6th Ethnographic Film Festival of Ecuador, and that same month at the 15th Cinema Vérité Film Festival. Then was screened in February 2022, at the 9th FIDBA, International Documentary Film Festival of Buenos Aires, on may, 2022, at the 16th Ethnocineca - International Documentary Film Festival Vienna, and on may, 2023, at the 19th FIFEQ - Festival International Du Film Ethnographique Du Québec / Montréal. The film was invited to be the focus of analysis at the Film Symposium of the international journal HAU: Journal of Ethnographic Theory 2024 14:1.

== Accolades ==
Year	Award / Festival	Category	Recipient	Result	Ref.
2021	8th Trujillo Film Festival	Best Documentary Feature Film	Perpetual Person	Nominated	
2022	13th APRECI Awards	Best Documentary	Perpetual Person	Nominated	
2022	16th Ethnocineca - International Documentary Film Festival Vienna	EVA - Excellence in Visual Anthropology Award	Perpetual Person	Won	
