= Until Porn Do Us Part =

2018 film

- Directed by: Jorge Pelicano
- Written by: Jorge Pelicano
- Produced by: Irina Calado
- Starring: Fostter Riviera; Eulália Almeida; Filomena Gigante
- Edited by: Jorge Pelicano; Inês Rueff
- Release dates: April 15, 2018 (BAFICI); November 30, 2018 (Portugal)
- Running time: 89 minutes
- Country: Portugal
- Language: Portuguese

Until Porn Do Us Part（Portuguese: Até Que o Porno Nos Separe）is a 2018 film directed by Jorge Pelicano.

== Plot ==
The film tells the story of a gay porn actor. Eulália, a conservative 65-year-old mother, finds out that her son who emigrated to Germany became Fostter Riviera, the internationally awarded first Portuguese gay porn actor. From shock and disgust to desperately trying to understand him, Eulália embarks on an emotional journey that puts her values, expectations and perceptions to the test. With the computer and Facebook as her main sources of information and communication, Eulália's quest to get closer to her son makes her click on unexpected websites, meet unlikely people and challenge herself to see her son perform a live sex show in the annual Portuguese erotic fair.
