= El Sheikh Emam =

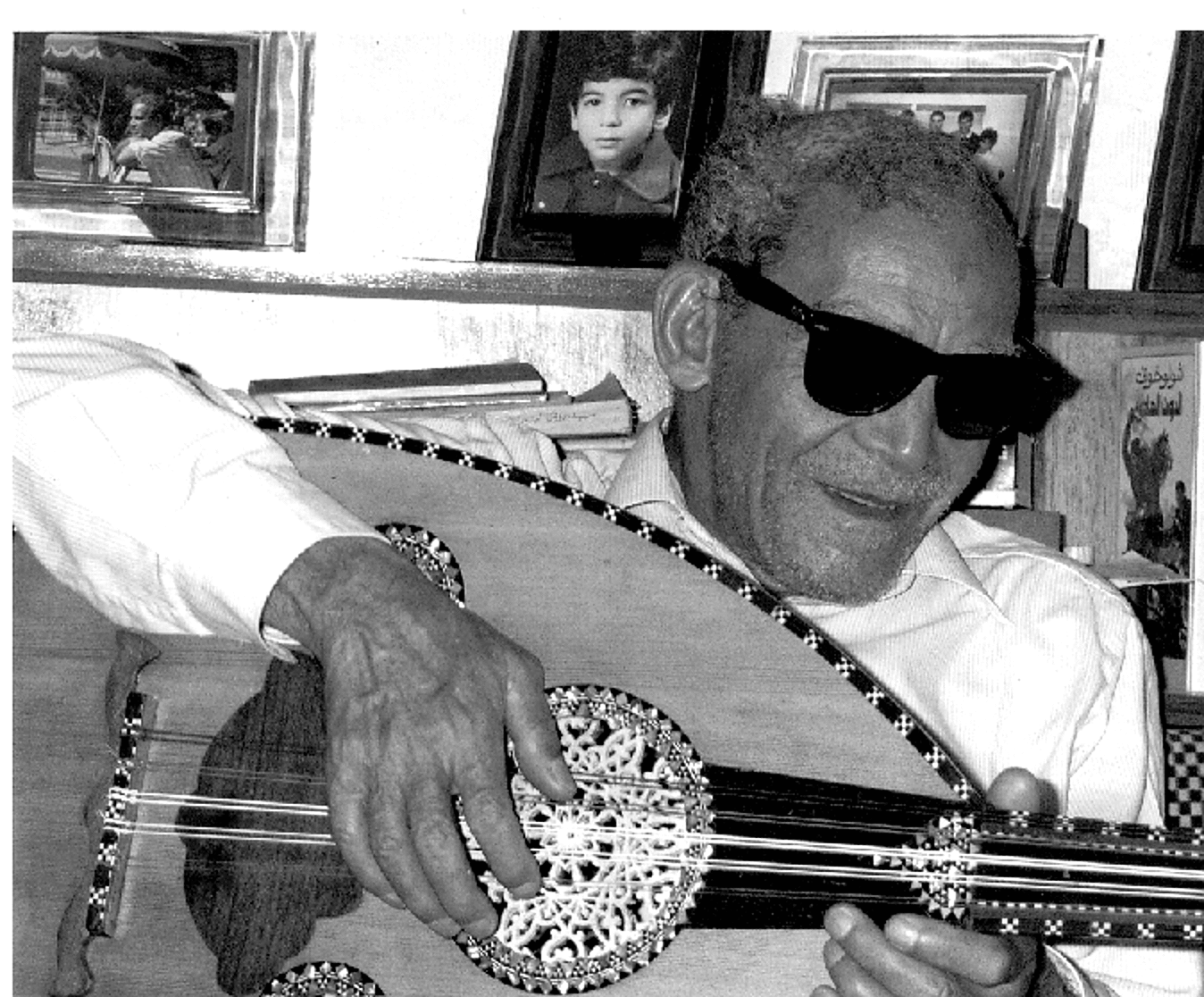

Background information
- Born: July 2, 1918
- Origin: Giza, Egypt
- Died: June 6, 1995 (aged 76) Egypt
- Genres: Egyptian music
- Occupation: Singer
- Instrument(s): Vocals, oud

Imam Mohammad Ahmad Eissa (Arabic: إمام محمد أحمد عيسى) or El Sheikh Emam (Arabic: الشيخ إمام; July 2, 1918 – June 6, 1995) was a famous Egyptian composer and singer. For most of his life, he formed a duo with the famous Egyptian colloquial poet Ahmed Fouad Negm. Together, they were known for their political songs in favor of the poor and the working classes.

== Early life and artistic beginnings ==
Imam was born in Abu al-Numrus, Giza Governorate, Egypt. After losing his eyesight early in life, he pursued religious studies at Al-Azhar, specializing in Quranic studies and Islamic jurisprudence. During this time, Imam developed an interest in music and learned to play the oud. He started performing religious songs and chants in local gatherings, gaining recognition for his distinct voice and musical talents.

== Life and career ==
Imam was born to a poor family in the Egyptian village of Abul Numrus in Giza. He lost his sight when he was a child. At the age of five he joined a recitation class, where he memorized the Qur'an. He later moved to Cairo to study where he led a dervish life. In Cairo, Imam met Sheikh Darwish el-Hareery, a prominent musical figure at that time, who taught him the basics of music and muwashshah singing. He then worked with the Egyptian composer Zakariyya Ahmad. At that time, he expressed interest in Egyptian folk songs especially those by Sayed Darwish and Abdou el-Hamouly. He also performed at weddings and birthdays.

=== Collaboration with Ahmed Fouad Negm ===
In 1962, Imam met the Egyptian poet Ahmed Fouad Negm. Negm, known for his colloquial Egyptian Arabic poetry and his focus on social and political issues, wrote the lyrics for many of Imam's songs. Their partnership lasted for more than 30 years, during which they produced numerous influential songs. The songs of Imam and Negm reflected the struggles, aspirations, and experiences of the working class, and often critiqued the political establishment. This unique combination of music and poetry resonated with a broad audience, as it gave voice to the challenges faced by many Egyptians.

=== Impact of 1967 War ===
Following Egypt's loss in the 1967 war, while much of the mainstream Egyptian music of that time expressed a sense of national pride and focused on rallying the people behind the government, Imam's songs took a different approach. Imam and Negm criticized the regime and its handling of the war, as well as its subsequent impact on Egyptian society. His song "Shaq'a Buq'a Ya Dil Al-Far" (شقع بقع يا ديل الفار) became particularly well-known, as it directly called for the people to rise up and overthrow the regime that lost the 1967 war. This bold stance led to further persecution, including bans from performing on Egyptian radio and television stations. Nonetheless, they were popular among ordinary people in the 1960s and 1970s. Their revolutionary songs criticizing the government after the 1967 war led them to imprisonment and detention several times.

== Late career ==
In the mid 1980s, Imam performed several concerts in France, Britain, Lebanon, Tunisia, Libya and Algeria. Imam and Negm later broke up after several disagreements. Imam died at the age of 76 after a long illness.

== Legacy ==
in 1991, Lebanese-French director Heiny Srour directed the short film, The Singing Sheikh, a 10 minutes documentary about Imam his music, and his legacy in Egyptian music.

== Notable songs ==
- "مصر يامة يا بهية" masr yama ya bheyya ("Egypt, how beautiful you are")
- "جيفارا مات" givāra māt ("Guevara has died")
- "الفلاحين" el-fallahīn ("the fellahin")
- "يعيش أهل بلدى" ye‘īš ahl baladi ("long live the people of my country")
- "شرفت يا نكسون بابا" sharraft ya nekson bāba ("it's been an honor, father Nixon" (sarcastic))
- "عن موضوع الفول واللحمة" ‘an mawdū‘ el-fūl wel-lahma ("on the topic of fūl and meat")
- "بقرة حاحا" baqaret hāhā ("Haha's cow")
- "فاليري جيسكار ديستان" valari giscār destān ("Valéry Giscard d'Estaing")
- "سجن القلعة" sign el-'al‘a ("the citadel prison")
- "طهران" tahrān ("Tehran")
- "جائزة نوبل" gā'izet nōbel ("Nobel Prize")
- "غابة كلابها ذيابة" gāba klabha diaba ("a wilderness whose dogs are wolves")
- "يا مصر قومي" ya masr 'ūmi ("O, Egypt, rise")
- "إذا الشمس غرقت" iza š-šams gir'et ("if the Sun drowned")
- "شيد قصورك ع المزارع" šayyed 'usūrak ‘al mazāre‘ ("erect your palaces on the farms")
- "أنا الشعب ماشي وعارف طريقي" ’ana š-ša‘bi māši w-‘āref tarī’i ("We are the people, we are marching, and we know our path")
- "الليل" el lail ("the night")
- "الثوري نوري" el thowry nowry ("the flashy revolutionary") (also referred to as hallawella)
- "شقع بقع يا ديل الفار" sho "a bo" a ya deel el far ("cracks and spots oh tail of the rat")
- "بحبك بحبك يا مصر" behabak behabak ya misr ("I love you, I love you, oh egypt")
- "شيد قصورك" shay'id oosorak ("erect your palaces")
- "الخواجه الامركاني el khawaga el amricany ("the american foreigner")
