= Jorge Pelicano =

Portuguese documentary filmmaker and television reporter

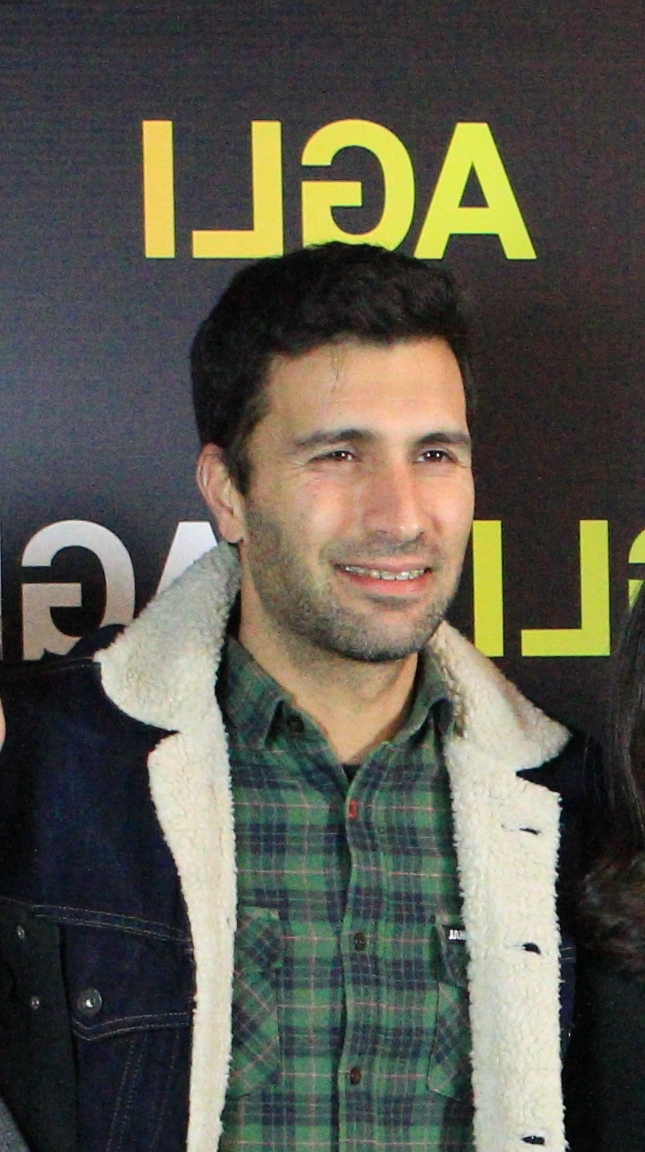
- Occupations: Filmmaker and Television Reporter

Jorge Eduardo Gil Pelicano (born 1977 in Figueira da Foz) is a Portuguese documentary filmmaker and television reporter, whose works feature economic and environmental impact issues, influence the global LGBT film community, and have been featured at international festivals including DOK Leipzig, Trento Film Festival, and CineEco.

== Life ==
Pelicano studied Communications and Public Relations at the Polytechnic Institute of Guarda and Communications and Journalism at the Faculty of Arts at the University of Coimbra.

== Career ==
Since 2001, he has been a freelance reporter for the television network, SIC. Pelicano is also known for his documentary films, including Ainda Há Pastores? (Are There Still Pastors), which premiered at the 2006 CineEco Film Festival and won an award there. It was the only Portuguese film selected for Brazil's Goiás film festival and won the Environmental Film Festival Network (EFFN) Green Award in Turin. In 2009, he released the award-winning Pare, Escute, Olhe (Stop, Listen, Look), shown at Italy's Trento Film Festival. This film, which portrayed the economic development of Portugal's inland mountains, was one of the most watched Portuguese films in the first half of 2010. It received awards at both CineEco and Doclisboa. Pelicano's 2009 film Uma Vida Normal won the prize for Best Picture at the Festival International du Grand Reportage d'Actualité (FIGRA).

His 2018 film Until Porn Do Us Part premiered at the Caminhos do Cinema, where it was awarded the Best Documentary and Audience Award. It also won the Best Documentary Award at Portugal's Sophia Awards, and was shown on national broadcaster, RTP. It also won Best Documentary at Amsterdam's Roze Filmdagen 2019.

== Filmography ==
- 2006: Ainda Há Pastores?
- 2009: Pare, Escute, Olhe
- 2014: Pára-me De Repente O Pensamento
- 2015: The Last Analog Tree
- 2018: Until Porn Do Us Part (Até Que o Porno Nos Separe)
- 2018: 4 Caminhos para Fátima
- 2019: Tony
