= Rana al-Tonsi =

Egyptian writer and poet

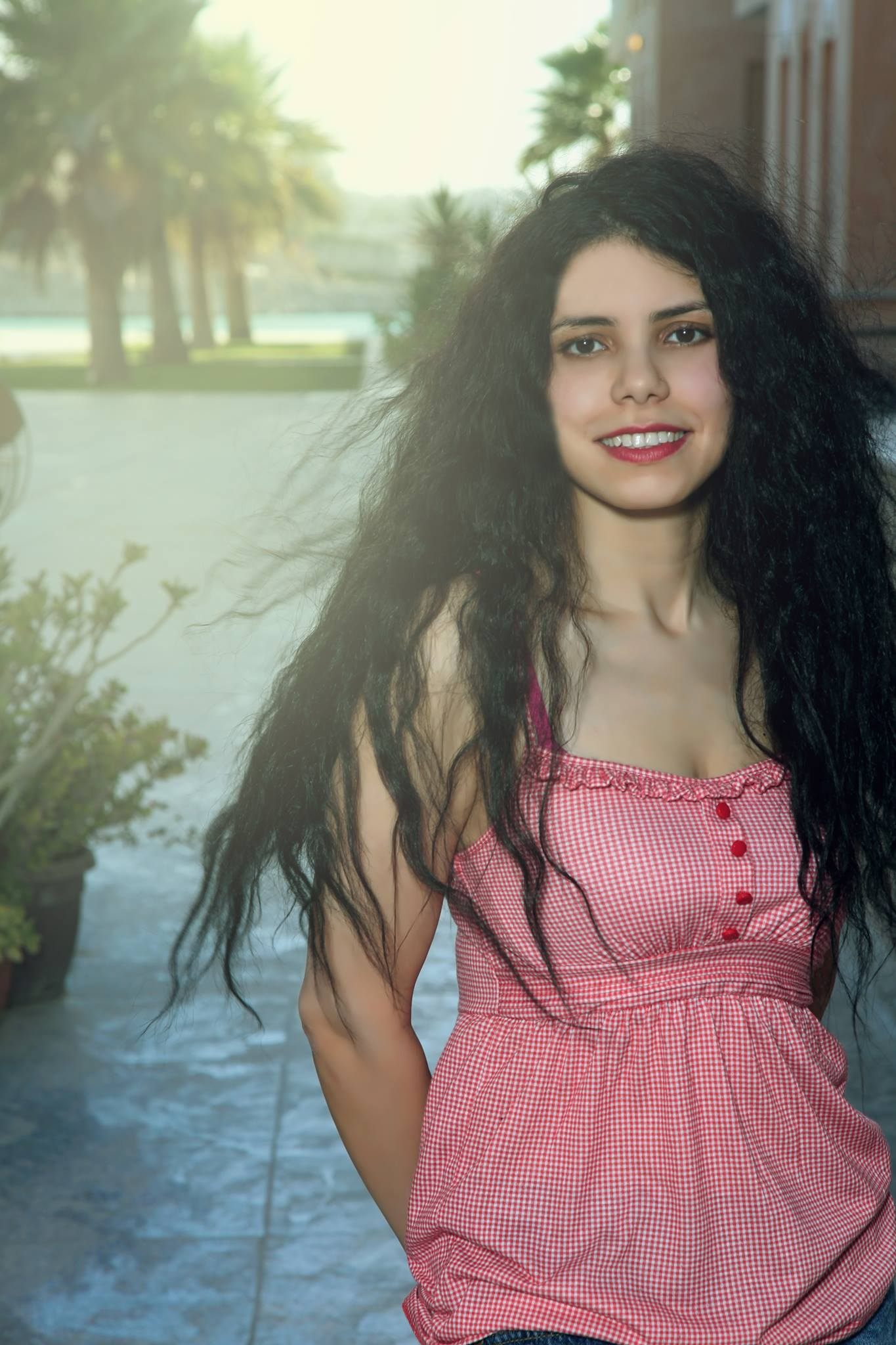
- Born: 27 November 1981 (age 44); Cairo, Egypt
- Citizenship: Doha, Qatar
- Occupation: Poet

Rana al-Tonsi (Arabic: رنا التونسي) is an Egyptian writer and poet.

== Early life ==
Al-Tonsi was born on 27 November 1981 in Cairo and attended the American University in Cairo. She started writing when she was young and published her first book before she was 20 years old. Her first collection, The House From Which Music Came was published to critical acclaim.

== Career ==
Al-Tonsi's writing addresses themes of violence, rebellion, motherhood and intimacy.

== Selected publications ==
Since her first publication, works include:

- A Rose for the Last Days (Merit House, Cairo, 2002)
- A Homeland Called Desire (Merit House, Cairo, 2005)
- Short History (Arab Renaissance House, Beirut, 2006)
- Kisses (Merit House, Cairo, 2010)
- Happiness (Prut, 2012)
- When I'm Not in the Air, Poetry (Jamal Publications, Beirut, 2014)
- The Book of Games (Orientals for Publishing, Cairo, 2015)
- Index of Fear (Dar Al-Ain Publishing, Cairo, 2018)

== Reception ==
Al-Tonsi is viewed as an important voice in the middle-generation of women poets who have published since the 1980s.

The late Egyptian poet Ahmed Fouad, the star of her third work, "A Homeland Called Desire", said that Rana Al-Tonsi "carries the concerns of an orphan generation rejecting the experience of the fathers who inherited the homeland." Egyptian critic Salah Fadl, says of Rana's Tunisian Poem that it "does not rely on a continuous narrative, for a single story ... but rather composes fragments of spaced parts … It ranges from the outside to the self, from sense to abstract morality ..."
