= Ahmed Fouad Negm =

Egyptian poet

Ahmad Fo'ad Negm

Background information
- Also known as: Elfagumi
- Born: 22 May 1929; Sharqia, Egypt
- Died: 3 December 2013 (aged 84) Cairo, Egypt
- Genre: Egyptian music
- Occupation: Vernacular poet
- Instruments: Vocals, Oud

Ahmad Fo'ad Negm (Arabic: أحمد فؤاد نجم, pronounced [ˈæħmæd foˈʔæːd ˈneɡm]; 22 May 1929 – 3 December 2013), popularly known as El-Fagumi الفاجومي ([elfæˈɡuːmi]), was an Egyptian vernacular poet. Negm is well known for his work with Egyptian composer Sheikh Imam, as well as his patriotic and revolutionary Egyptian Arabic poetry. Negm has been regarded as "a bit of a folk hero in Egypt."

== Early life ==
Ahmed Fouad Negm was born in a small village north of Cairo, Egypt, to a family of fellahin. His mother, Hanem Morsi Negm, was a housewife, and his father Mohammed Ezat Negm, a police officer. Negm was one of seventeen brothers. Like many poets and writers of his generation, he received his education at the religious Kutaab schools managed by El-Azhar.

He was six years old when his father died. He went to live with his uncle Hussein in Zagazig, but was placed in an orphanage in 1936 where he first met famous singer Abdel Halim Hafez. In 1945, at the age of 17, he left the orphanage and returned to his village to work as a shepherd. Later, he moved to Cairo to live with his brother who eventually kicked him out only to return to his village again to work in one of the English camps while helping with guerilla operations.

After the agreement between Egypt and Britain, the Egyptian National Workers' Movement asked everyone in the English camps to quit their job. Negm was then appointed by the Egyptian government as a laborer in mechanical workshops. He was imprisoned for 3 years for counterfeiting form, during which he participated and won first place in a writing competition organized by the Supreme Council for the Arts. He then published his first collection "Pictures from Life and Prison" in vernacular Egyptian Arabic and became famous after Suhair El-Alamawi introduced his book while he was still in prison. After he was released, he was appointed as a clerk in the organization for Asian and African peoples. He also became a regular poet on Egyptian radio.

Negm lived in a small room on the rooftop of a house in Boulaq el-Dakror neighborhood. When he met singer and composer Sheikh Imam in Khosh Adam neighborhood, they became roommates and formed a famous signing duet. Negm was also imprisoned several times due to his political views, particularly his harsh criticism of Egyptian presidents Gamal Abdel Nasser, Anwar Sadat and Hosni Mubarak.

== Negm-Imam duo ==
The residence of Ahmed Fouad Negm in the poorest neighborhoods of Cairo, Egypt, exposed him to the most talented professionals such as Sheikh Imam Eissa, impoverished poets and artists. But, Sheikh Imam in particular compensated Negm for the earlier rejection by his orphanage-mate Abdel Halim Hafez.

In 1962, Negm was introduced to Imam by a friend who believed that the two, poet Negm and composer Imam, could make a perfect duo. On the first occasion, Negm noticed that Imam took over an hour to tweak the strings of the Oud before starting his first demonstration to the new guest. Negm shouted "Allah" upon listening to Imam's singing and playing the Oud. The blind Sheikh was equally longing for inspiring words of the sort Negm had. That was the spark that lasted 30 years of concerted writing by Negm, composing by Imam, and singing by the two combined.

Negm was quick enough to sense that the blind Sheikh was a hidden treasure of Islamic literacy and music talent, and with his physical handicap, he could use the help of Negm's eyes and words. Hence, Negm proposed to stay in Imam's residence. As he recounted, his other rented room has properties worth 6 Egyptian pounds, thus if he threw away the key for his other room, the landlord was required three months before breaking into the room and possessing its content. Negm took the risk, abandoned his rented room with its contents and stuck with Sheikh Imam from 1962 throughout 1995.

== Personal life ==
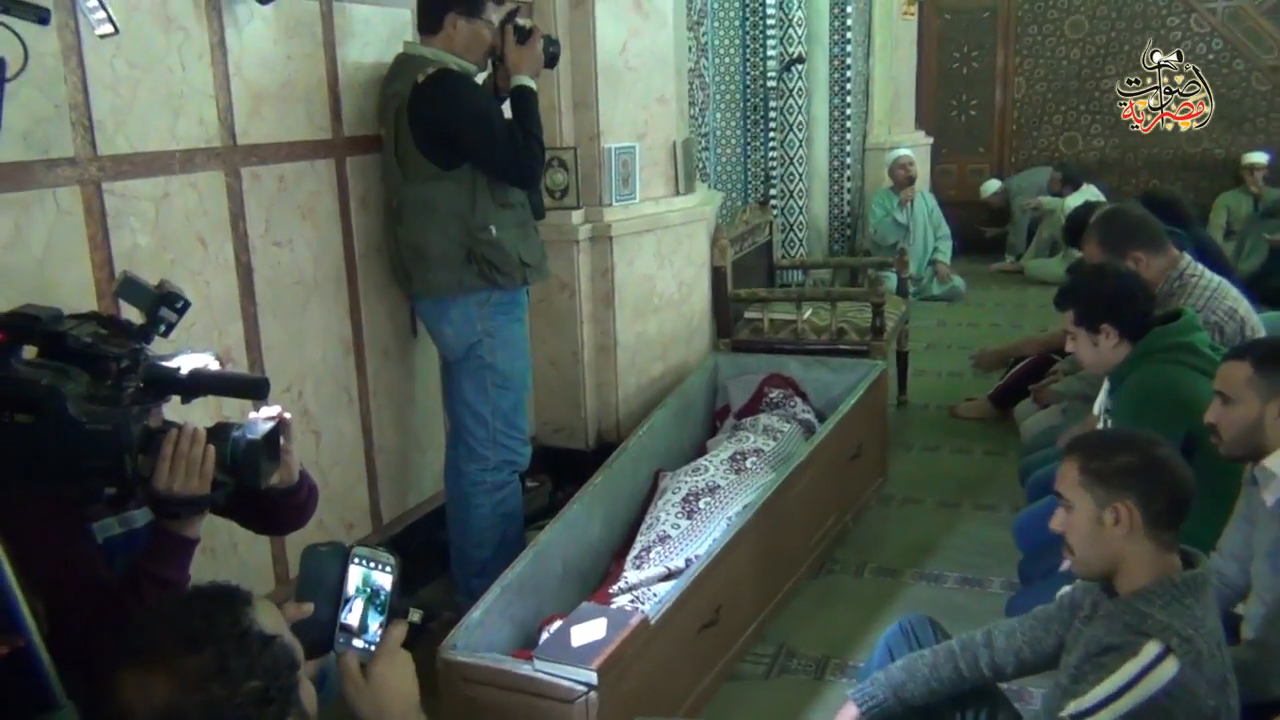
Negm's funeral ceremony in December 2013

Negm was married a number of times. His wives and children were as follows:

- Fatima Mansour with whom he had Afaf
- Izzah Balbaa, an artist
- Safinaz Kazem, a journalist and literary critic, with whom he had a daughter Nawara Negm, who became a journalist, blogger and human rights activist
- Sonia Mikiew, an Algerian actress
- Omaymah Abd Al-Wahhab, with whom he had Zainab.

He had three grandchildren, Mustafa, Safaa, and Ameinah.

In the early hours of 3 December 2013, Negm died at the age of 84 in Cairo. Although he had been ill for a long time, publisher Mohamed Hashem said Negm sounded fine the day before his death, but remarked further that his voice was "a little heavy". Negm's funeral took place in Al-Hussein Mosque, Cairo.

== Awards ==
In 2007, Negm was chosen by the United Nations Poverty Action as Ambassador of the Poor.

Ahmed Fouad Negm won the 2013 Prince Claus Awards for ‘Unwavering Integrity’.

== Bibliography ==
=== Books by Ahmed Fouad Negm ===
- بلدي وحبيبتي. (= Baladī wa-ḥabībtī: qasayid min almuetaqal; English: My Country and My Beloved: Poems from Prison), Beirut: Dar Ibn Khaldun, 1973.
- بيان هام (= Bayan ham; English: Important Statement), Beirut: Dar Al-Farabi, 1985.
- أغنيات الحب والحياة (= Ughnīyāt al-ḥubb wa-al-ḥayāh); English: Songs of Love and Life), Cairo: Maktabat Madbūlī, 1988.
- المرجيحة (= al-Murjīḥah; English: The Swing), Cairo: Maktabat Madbūlī al-Ṣaghīr, 1993.

=== Books about Ahmed Fouad Negm ===
- Kamal Abdel-Malek, Kamal, A Study of the Vernacular Poetry of Aḥmad Fuʼād Nigm, Leiden: Brill Publishers, 1990.
- Rana al-Tonsi, A Homeland Called Desire, Cairo: Merit House, 2005.
- Mohamed F. El-Hewie, Ahmed Fouad Negm: Egypt's Revolutionary Poet: A Rebel Unlike Any: English-Arabic Translation, Literary, Political, Historical, and Psychological Analysis, [San Bernardino, CA]: Shaymaa Publishing, 2013.
- Nawara Negm, وانت السبب يابا , (= Winta Il-Sabab Yaba; English: And You're The Reason, Father), Cairo: Al-Karmah, 2022.
