= Isilda Pelicano =

Portuguese fashion designer

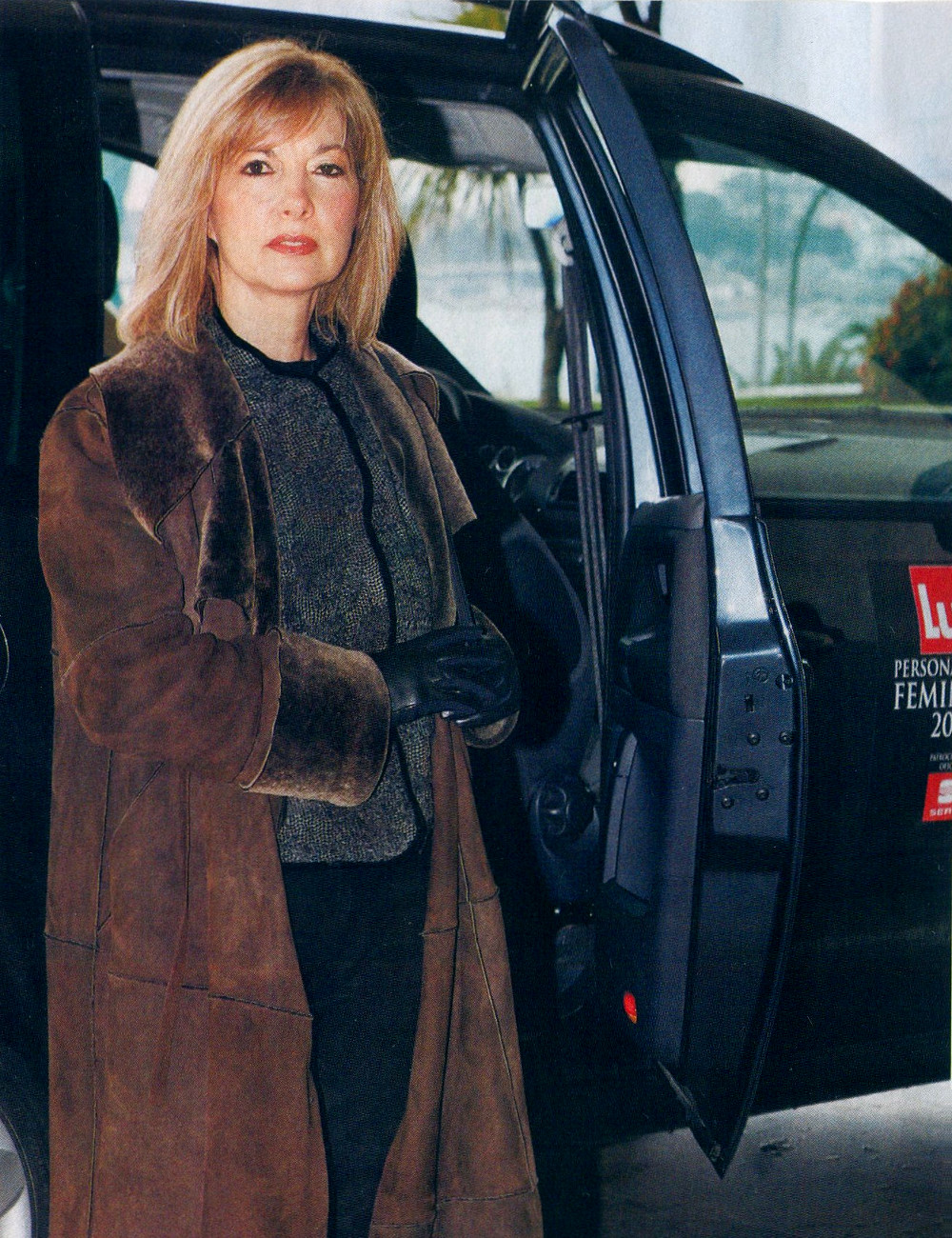
- Born: Maria Isilda Pelicano Lopes; 3 December 1949 (age 76); Alfaiates, Sabugal Municipality, Portugal
- Education: German Philology (1974) at Lisbon University, Education by the Art (1983) at Conservatório Nacional, Interiors Design (1978) at IADE, Fashion Design (1991) at IADE (Instituto de Artes Visuais, Design e Marketing)
- Labels: ISILDA PELICANO; JANS Concept

Isilda Pelicano (born in 1949) is a Portuguese fashion designer based in Lisbon.

She was born in Alfaiates, Sabugal Municipality, Portugal and received her Fashion Design degree from the IADE - Instituto de Artes Visuais, Design e Marketing in Lisbon.

She started her career in 1991 and has presented women's Collections every season under the brand name Isilda Pelicano since then.

She has also had regular participation in several Fashion Shows such as FILMODA, PORTO DE MODA, PORTUGAL FASHION, FASHION BUSINESS ANGOLA.

Through a separate division within her company, Isilda has also carried out significant work in the area of uniforms design. Clients have included the Portuguese Government Loja do Cidadão, Portugal Telecom for the Expo ‘98, UEFA Euro 2004™ and UEFA Euro 2008™.

She was a past winner of the “Smirnoff Fashion Award” and is a frequent feature in Portuguese newspapers and magazines. Most recently, Isilda was voted as “Best Female Personality in Fashion – 2006” by readers of popular Portuguese publication Lux Magazine and in 2011 she was awarded a Career Prize “Prémio IADE Carreira 2011”.

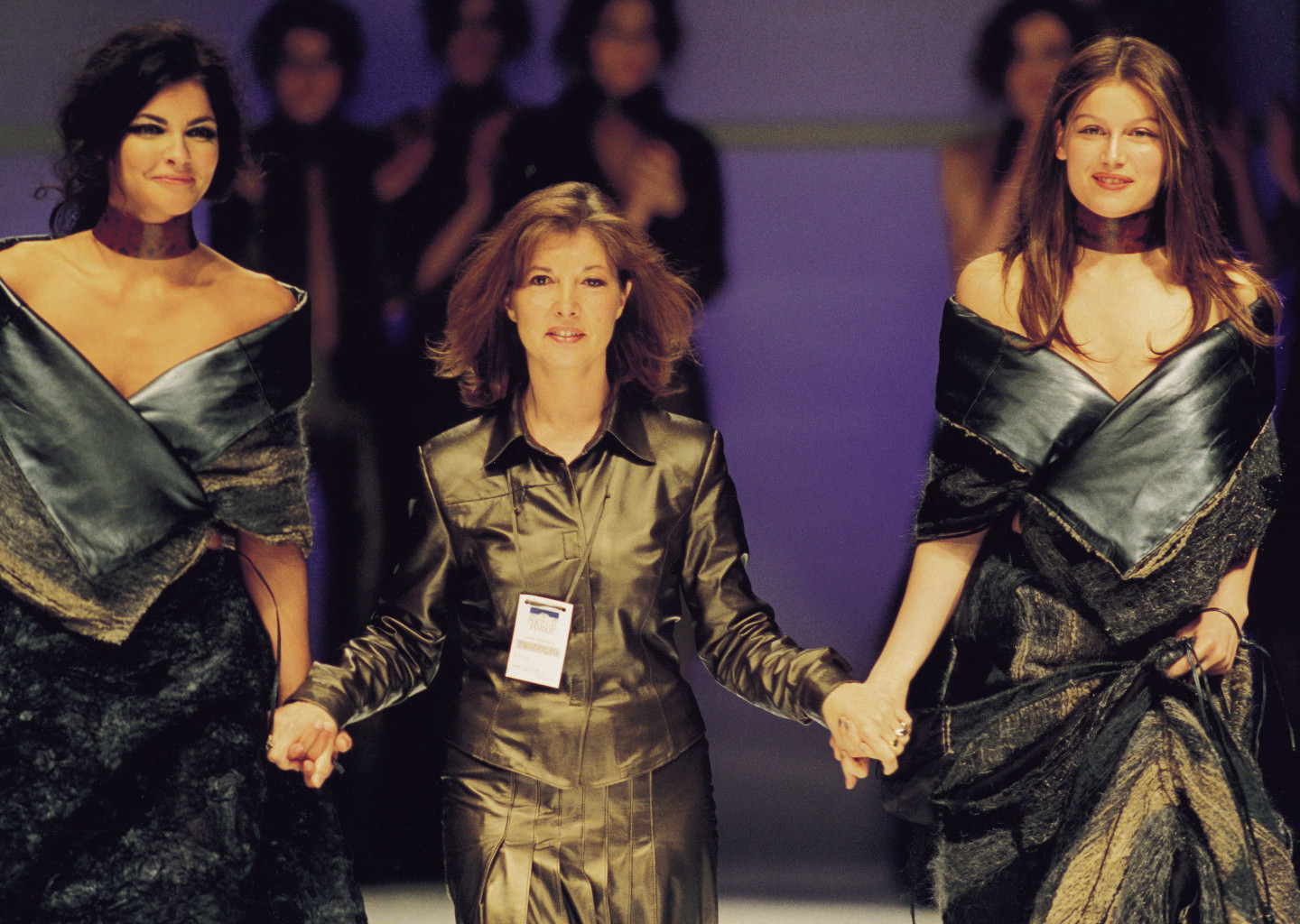
ISILDA PELICANO AW 00-01 @ Portugal Fashion

== Biography ==
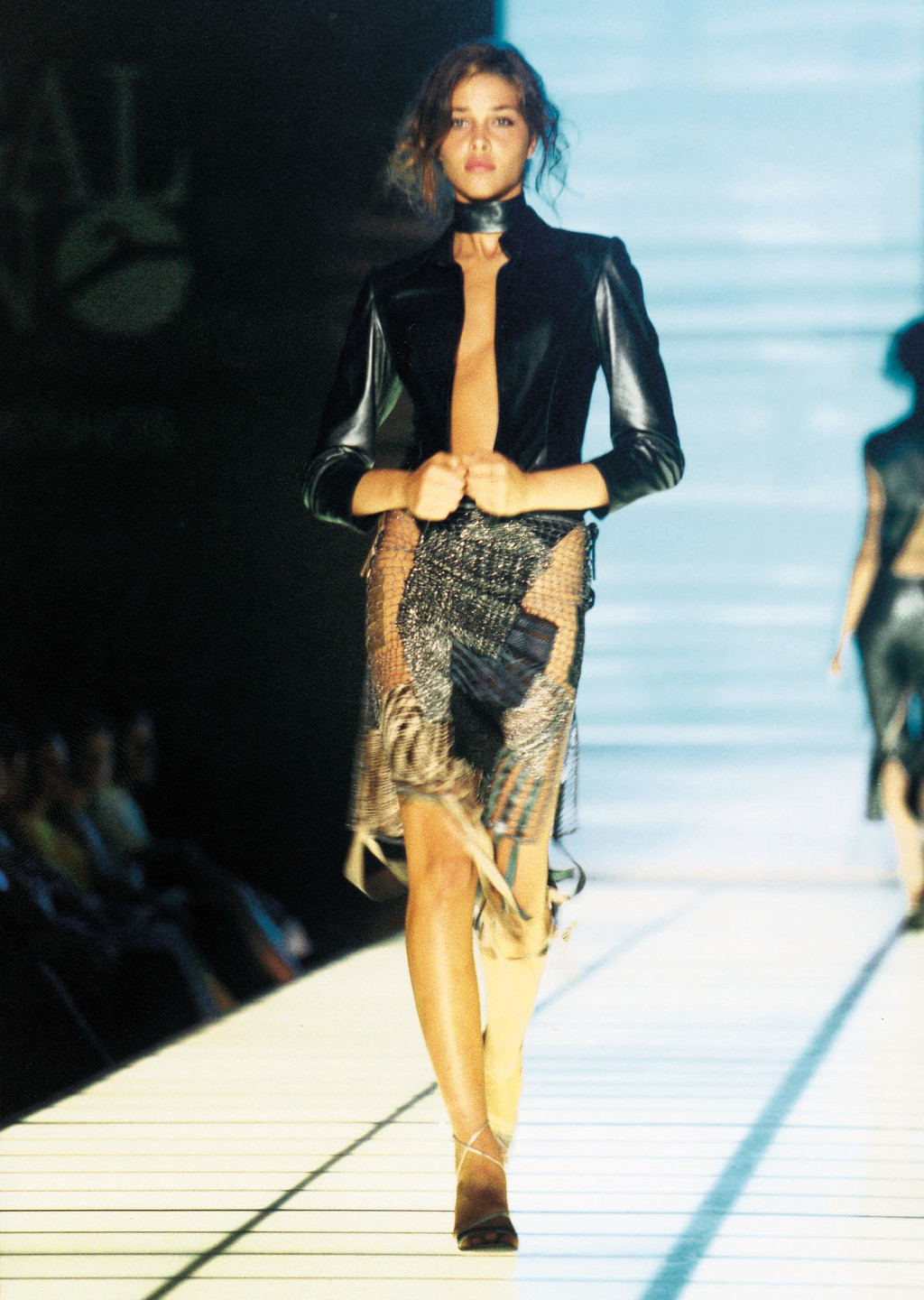
ISILDA PELICANO AW 00-01 @ Portugal Fashion

=== Early years ===
Isilda Pelicano was born in Alfaiates, Portugal, on 3 December 1949. She lives and works in Lisbon.

=== Education ===
She holds the following degrees:

- in German Philology (1974) at Lisbon University
- In Education by the Art (1983) at Conservatório Nacional
- In Interiors Design (1978) at IADE – Instituto de Artes Visuais, Design e Marketing
- In Fashion Design (1991) at IADE – Instituto de Artes Visuais, Design e Marketing

== Career ==
Before enrolling in the world of fashion as a fashion designer, Isilda Pelicano was very active in the education field, between the year of 1979 and 1990.

Her first important work related to fashion was the conception of the uniforms for Volunteer of the Portuguese Oncology Institute, (“Voluntárias do Instituto Português de Oncologia” - IPO) in 1990.

In 1991 her participation in the “Smirnoff Fashion Award”, in Lisbon, as granted Isilda Pelicano her first award in the fashion world, as she won the 1º Prize of the competition. Later she presented a collection in the “International Smirnoff Fashion Award” in Amsterdam.

In the same year she also participated in several catwalk shows: Hotel do Luso Fashion Runway, “Novos Criadores” (New Creators) in FIL – International Lisbon Fair - and in Guimarães.

Her first Collection (AW'92-93) was released in 1992 at Expowear/Filmoda.

In 1994 Isilda Pelicano opened the company department for UNIFORMS, responsible for the creation of uniforms to public institutes and companies such as CENTRALCER (SAGRES), ESCOLA SUPERIOR DE ENFERMAGEM DA CRUZ VERMELHA, SOC. REC. DE CAMPO MAIOR (Cafés DELTA), CORO GREGORIANO DE LISBOA, HOSPITAL DA CUF, LOJA DO CIDADÃO, among others.

At that same year she presented her collection Fall-Winter'94-95, at “Opção Mulher” - Filmoda and with the SS'95 Collection, being awarded in the competition “Concurso de Design Industrial” at FIL

Between 1996 and 1997 she participated in some “uniform contests” by invitation, such as PORTUGAL TELECOM, TV CABO, BANCO MELLO, BANCO UNIVERSO, PEUGEOT, BELAS CLUBE DE CAMPO and EXPO’98. She was also invited and chosen to design the dress of the Portuguese Célia Lawson, performer contest in the “EUROVISION Song Contest”. At that period she presented her collection AW’96-97 at ExpoFashion/Filmoda, and participated in fashion shows like PORTUGAL FASHION. She also participated in a Portuguese products exhibition promoted by ICEP and INNO at Bruxels.

In 1997 she was awarded with the Design and manufacturing of the Uniform for PORTUGAL TELECOM at EXPO’98.

At the year of the EXPO’98, Isilda Pelicano designed and supplied the official uniforms to PORTUGAL TELECOM to this International Exhibition, the Uniforms to LOJA DO CIDADÃO and the new redesigned for CENTRALCER (Sagres) uniforms. Isilda Pelicano also participates in several fashion events that year, such as MOCAP, NEOJOIA, MODACALZADO (Madrid), SELECTIV MODA, PORTO de MODA and PORTUGAL FASHION.

In 1999 she attended several fashion shows like, EXPOCOURO, and PORTO de MODA.

In 2004, Isilda Pelicano won the international competition to design and supply the UEFA official uniforms to the staff of Euro 2004TM. She was among 9 other competitors.

In 2007, by the second time in a row, she won the international contest to design, produce and deliver the official uniform of the staff of the UEFA European Football Championship (UEFA EURO 2008™.) that took place in Switzerland and Austria.

In 2011, she was awarded with Career Prize “Prémio IADE Carreira 2011" that distinguishes former students for the excellence of their creative and innovative personality as for their contribution in the field of scientific and academical knowledge and their impact in Portuguese society in the fields of Design, Marketing, Advertising, Photography and Visual Culture.

== Notability ==
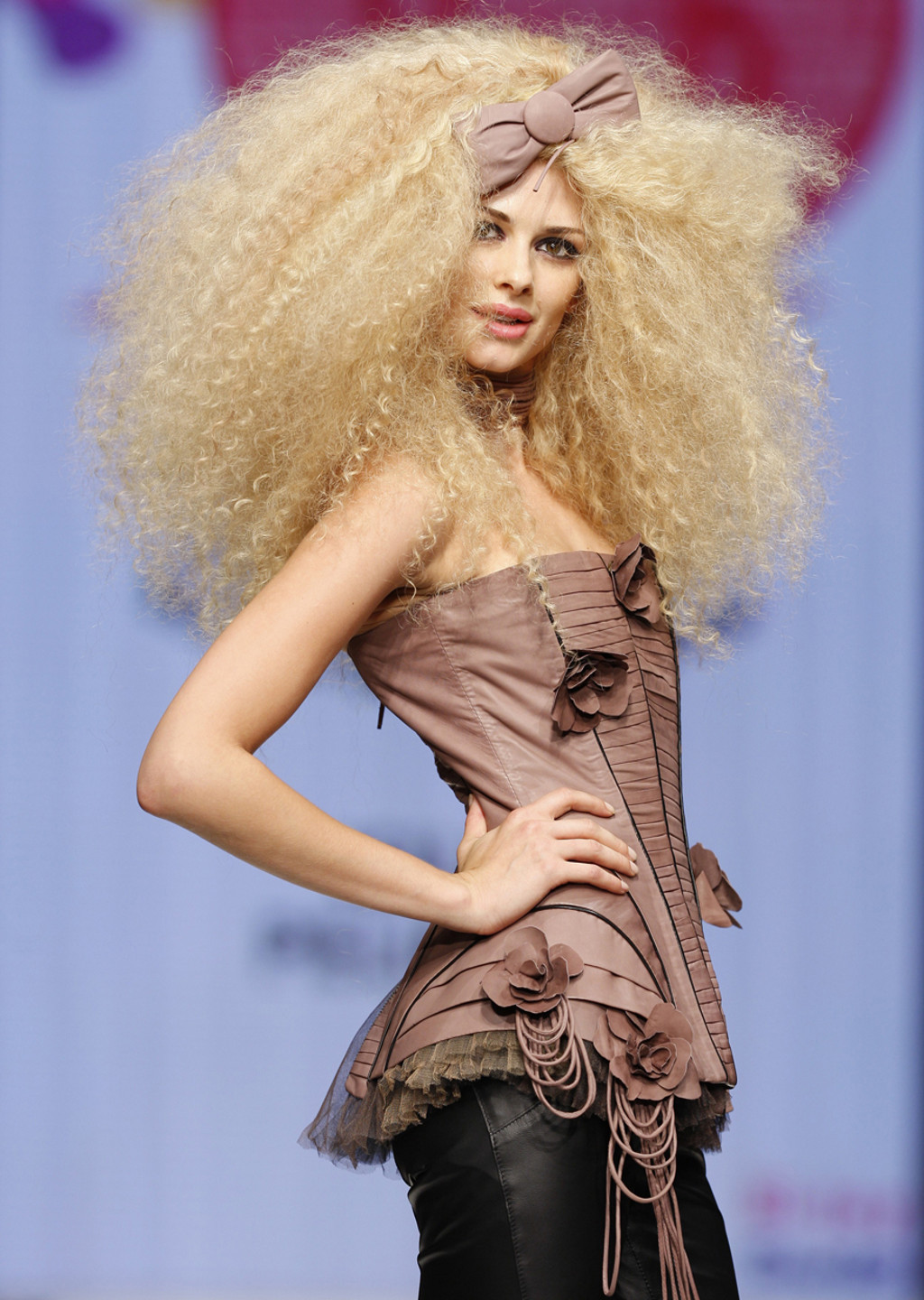
ISILDA PELICANO @ MODA LISBOA for Hello Kitty

She also conceived a dress to the well known French actress Laetitia Casta.

She was invited to dress the world famous doll Barbie and created a costume inspired in Hello Kitty.

In 2011 she was invited to participate in "FBA - Fashion Business Angola", representing Portugal.

Isilda Pelicano and her creations appears frequently in Portuguese fashion magazines as a reference in the fashion business.

== Awards ==
- “Smirnoff Fashion Award”, in Lisbon – 1st Prize
- "IPO (Portuguese Oncology Institute) / League Against Cancer - Honourable Mention" (Liga Portuguesa Contra o Cancro - Menção Honrosa)
- Best Portuguese Female Personality in Fashion - 2006
- Career Prize “Prémio IADE Carreira 2011"
