= Doclisboa =

Portuguese film festival

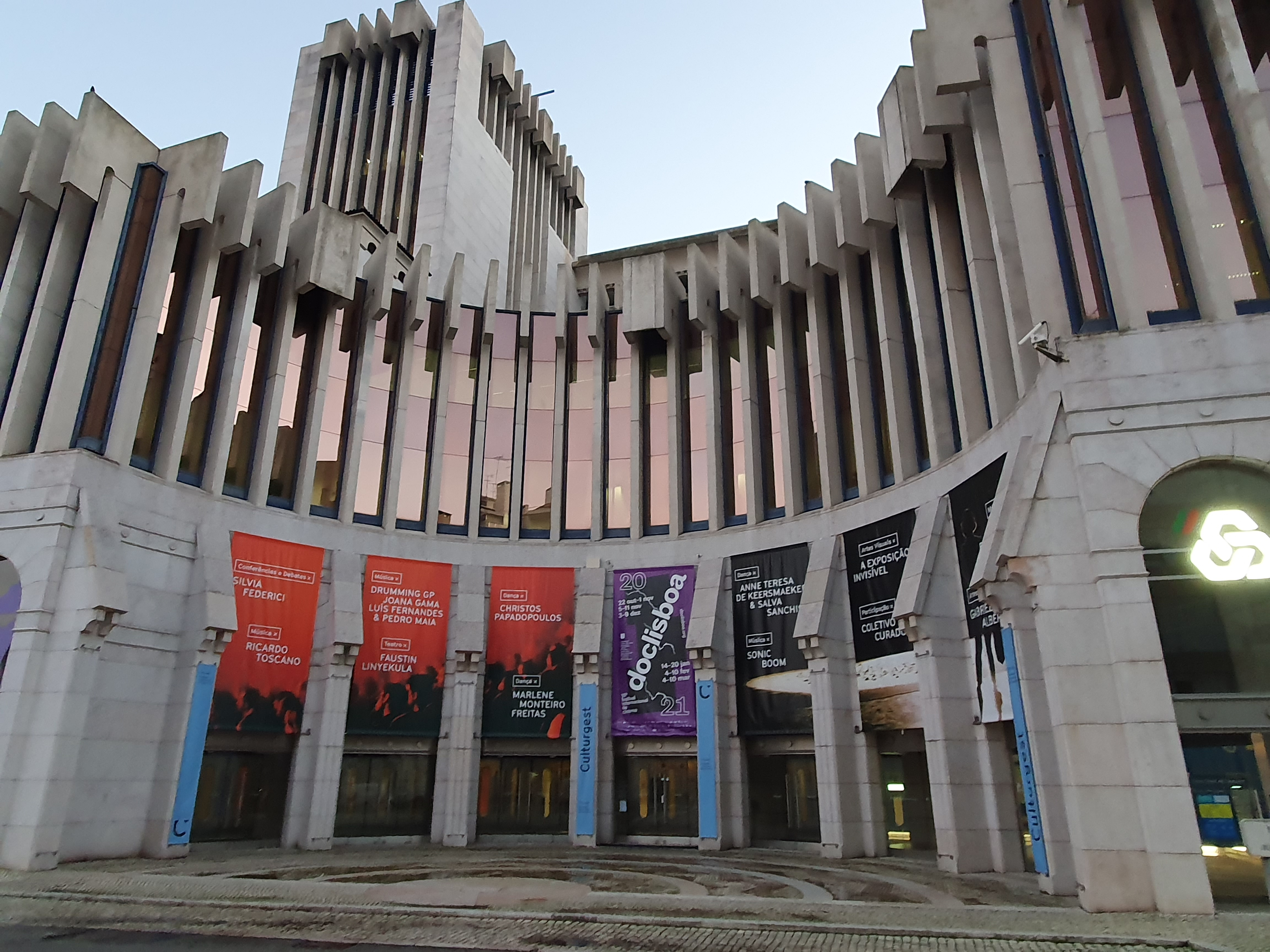
Doclisboa entrance at CulturGest

Doclisboa is a documentary film festival in Lisbon, Portugal which held its first edition in 2002.

Doclisboa is part of the Doc Alliance — a creative partnership between 7 key European documentary film festivals.

== Editions ==
In 2020, Doclisboa was organized into six moments of programme across six months, in order to deal with the pandemic restrictions while presenting its physical screenings in Lisbon's main venues.

In 2021, the festival returned to its original, with a 11-day live format. The 19th edition took place between 21 and 31 October, with its original sections, featuring a total of 249 films.

In 2022, the festival's 20th edition was held from 6 to 16 October, with films from all over the world, with competitive and non-competitive sections: the International Competition, National Competition, New Visions, From the Earth to the Moon, Heart Beat, Retrospectives, Cinema of Urgency, Green Years and Doc Alliance.

== Awards ==
=== Best Film (International Competition) ===
Year	English title	Original title	Director(s)	Country
2004	At School	A scuola	Leonardo di Costanzo	Italy
2005 †	Before the Flood		Yan Yu and Li Yifan	China
2005 †	Alimentation générale		Chantal Briet	France
2006	Tierra Negra		Ricardo Íscar	Spain
2007	These Girls	El-Banate Dol	Tahani Rached	Egypt
2008	End of the Rainbow		Robert Nugent	France
2009	Petition		Zhao Liang	China
2010	El Sicario, Room 164		Gianfranco Rosi	Italy / France
2011	It's The Earth Not the Moon	É na Terra Não é na Lua	Gonçalo Tocha	Portugal
2012	Three Sisters		Wang Bing	France / Hong Kong
2013	What Now? Remind Me	E Agora? Lembra-me	Joaquim Pinto	Portugal
2014	Fathers and Sons	Fu Yu Zi	Wang Bing	China / France
2015	Il Solengo		Alessio Rigo de Righi, Matteo Zoppis	Italy / Argentina
2016	Calabria		Pierre-François Sauter	Switzerland
2017	Milla		Valérie Massadian	France / Portugal
2018	Greetings From Free Forests		Ian Soroka	United States / Slovenia / Croatia
2019	Santikhiri Sonata		Thunska Pansittivorakul	Thailand / Germany
2021	918 Nights		Arantza Santesteban	Spain
