= Nawara Negm =

Egyptian journalist, blogger and human rights activist

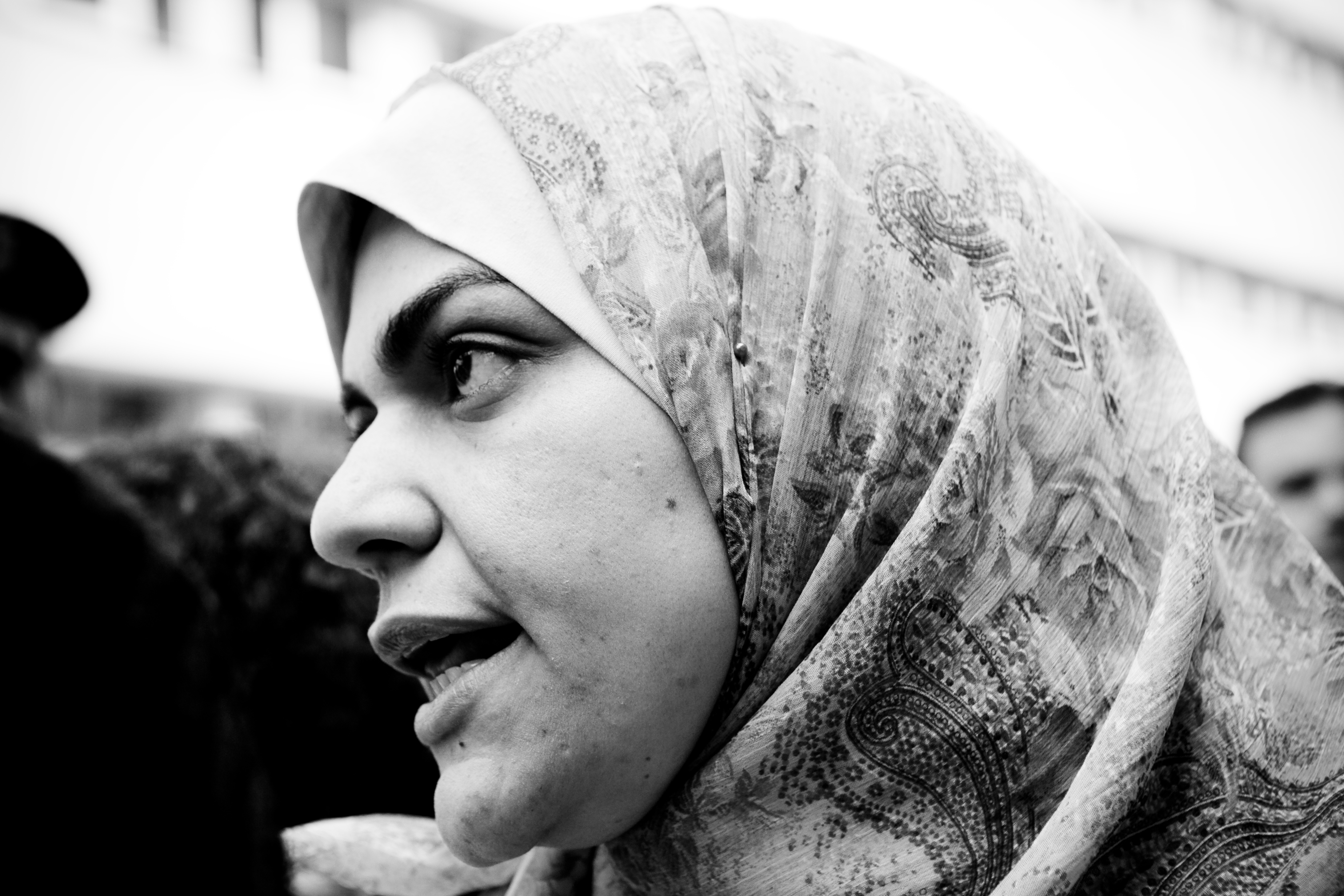
- Born: 1973 (age 51–52); Cairo
- Citizenship: Egypt
- Education: Bachelors degree
- Alma mater: Ain Shams University
- Occupations: Journalist, activist
- Father: Ahmed Fouad Negm

Nawara Negm (Arabic: نوارة نجم, IPA: [nɑwˈwɑːɾɑ ˈneɡm]) (born in Cairo in 1973) is an Egyptian journalist, blogger and human rights activist based in Cairo, Egypt. Daughter of the Notable leftist Egyptian poet Ahmed Fouad Negm and Islamist Egyptian thinker and journalist Safinaz Kazem, she obtained her BA in English Language from the Faculty of Arts, Ain Shams University and has since worked for the Egyptian Nile Television Network (NTN) as a translator and news editor.

== Writings ==
In 2009 she published her first book, Esh A'rrih ('A Nest on the Wind'; Arabic: عش عالريح, IPA: [ʕeʃ.ʃe ʕæɾˈɾiːħ, ʕælˈ-]), a collection of articles, and in the same year she co-authored a book written exclusively by women writers under the title of Ana Ontha (I'm Female; Arabic: أنا أنثى).

In 2023, she published a memoir about her relationship with her father, Winta Il-Sabab Yaba (And You're The Reason, Father; Arabic: وانت السبب يابا).

== Career ==
Since her first year in university, from 1992 to 1993, Negm apprenticed as a journalist for Al-Sahabab, a monthly magazine issued by Al-Ahram Publishing House, then she moved to the English-language Al-Ahram Weekly, issued also by Al-Ahram. She worked as an apprentice for Nesf Al-Donia, a weekly women's magazine also printed by Al-Ahram. Sanaa Al-Bissy, the then editor-in-chief of the magazine decided to hire her but Ibrahim Nafie, ex-CEO of Al-Ahram, refused, saying that "she will be tenured when she ceases to be the daughter of Safinaz Kazem and Ahmed Fouad Negm".

So Nawara Negm left Al-Ahram to explore other opportunities, working for AlWafd (a daily newspaper owned and run by the opposition party Al-Wafd), El-Helwa magazine, and Al-Qahira (a weekly newspaper published by the Ministry of Culture). Soon after graduating in 1997, she joined the Nile Television Network.

== Journalistic writings ==
Negm contributed a weekly column every Sunday for AlWafd, later she joined Al-Dustour daily newspaper to which electronic version she still contributes. Among her most well-known contributions to the electronic Al-Dustour is an Arabic translation in December 2010 of selected leaked diplomatic cables concerning Egypt and some other Arab countries.

== Blog ==
In 2006 Negm inaugurated her predominantly political blog titled Gabhet El Tahyees El Shaabeya (Arabic: جبهة التهييس الشعبية, IPA: [ˈɡæbhet et-, el.tæhˈjiːs eʃ-, el.ʃæʕˈbejːæ]; may be translated, imperfectly, as 'Popular Front of Sarcasm'). The header of the blog features a young girl biting barbed wire and includes a caption, both in Arabic and in English, that reads "Freedom is only for those who are ready to die."

During the Jan 25th Revolution, Negm was actively present in Tahrir Square Cairo and volunteered as a spokesperson of the revolution, reporting to the media, mainly Al Jazeera TV, her observations.

== See also ==
- Asmaa Mahfouz
- George Ishak
- Ahmed Ghanem
- Wael Ghonim
- Hossam el-Hamalawy
- Mona Seif
- Ahmed Harara
