= Safinaz Kazem =

Egyptian author and literary critic

- Born: 17 August 1937 (age 88); Alexandria
- Citizenship: Egypt
- Education: Bachelors degree
- Alma mater: Cairo University
- Occupations: Journalist, author
- Spouse: Ahmed Fouad Negm
- Children: Nawara Negm

Safinaz Kazem, also written Safynaz Kazem (Arabic: صفيناز كاظم, born 17 August 1937 in Alexandria), is an Egyptian author and literary critic.

After obtaining her Bachelor of Arts degree in journalism from Cairo University in 1959, she wrote many articles.

Safinaz Kazem began her training as a journalist at Akhbar El Yom newspaper in November 1955, while still a student at the Faculty of Arts, Cairo University. Later she worked at the magazines Akher Saa and Al-Geel Al-Gadeed, then she moved to Al-Helal Publishing House as a writer and theatrical critic for the magazines Al-Musawar, Al-Helal, and Al-Kawakeb.

Currently, she contributes to the Egyptian Almasry Alyoum. and the Saudi Asharq Al-Awsat daily newspapers.

On 24 August 1972, Safinaz Kazem married the renowned Egyptian vernacular poet Ahmed Fouad Negm and their only daughter, Nawara, was born in October 1973, during the October War. Kazem and Negm divorced in July 1976.

== Her experience in Iraq ==
After suffering harassment by the Sadat regime, which she used to criticise, Safinaz Kazem went to Iraq and joined the staff of the Al-Mustansiriya University Faculty of Arts in Baghdad as a drama lecturer (1975–1980). She later documented her experiences under the Saddam regime and its 'atrocities' against the Iraqi people in a controversial book that she published in London under the title of The Bagdad Diary (Arabic: يوميات بغداد) in 1982.

== Her writings ==
- Romantikeyyat ('Romantics'; Arabic: رومانتيكيات), Al-Helal Publishing House, 1970.
- Yawmeyyat Bagdad ('The Bagdad Diary'; Arabic: يوميات بغداد).
- Talabeeb Al-Ketaba (Arabic: تلابيب الكتابة).
- Al-Khade'aa An-Nassereyya ('The Nasserist Trick'; Arabic: الخديعة الناصرية).
- Fi Mas'alat As-Sofour wal-Hijab ('On Sofour and Hijab; Arabic: في مسألة السفور والحجاب).
- Ro'aa wa Zaat (Arabic: رؤى وذات).
- Al-Hakika wa Ghaseel Al-Mokh ('Facts and Brainwashing'; Arabic: الحقيقة وغسيل المخ).
- Men Malaff Masrah As-Setteeneyyat (Arabic: من ملف مسرح الستينيات).
- Masrah Al-Masraheyyeen (Arabic: مسرح المسرحيين).
- Men Daftar Al-Molahazaat (Arabic: من دفتر الملاحظات).
- An Al-Hobb wal-Horreyya ('On Love and Liberty; Arabic: عن الحب والحرية).
- Taxi El-Kalam (Arabic: تاكسي الكلام).
- San'et Latafa (Arabic: صنعة لطافة).
- Soorat Saddam (Arabic: صورة صدام).
- Resaleyyat fi Al-Bayt An-Nabawy (Arabic: رساليات في البيت النبوي).
