= Giran (film) =

- Directed by: Tahani Rached Mona Assaad
- Screenplay by: Tahani Rached Mona Assaad
- Produced by: Studio Masr
- Cinematography: Nancy Abdel-Fattah
- Edited by: Mohamed Samir
- Music by: Tamer Karawan
- Release date: 2009
- Running time: 105 minutes
- Country: Egypt

Giran is an Egyptian 2009 documentary film.

== Synopsis ==
Built at the dawn of the 20th century, the neighborhood of Garden City was a small residential area bordering on downtown Cairo, Egypt, where international political leaders had their residences. Giran walks us through this neighborhood as it is nowadays. Abandoned mansions, luxurious salons, embassies, shops or rooftops, where a whole family lives. The houses and their occupants, witnesses of the changes in History, tell tales of break-ups, hopes and survival.

== Technical data ==
- Director: Tahani Rached and Mona Assaad
- Production: Studio Masr
- Script: Tahani Rached and Mona Assaad
- Image: Nancy Abdel-Fattah
- Sound: Sameh Gamal
- Music: Tamer Karawan
- Editing: Mohamed Samir
