= Tahani Rached =

Canadian-Egyptian documentary filmmaker (born 1947)

- Born: May 16, 1947 (age 78); Cairo, Egypt
- Occupation: Filmmaker
- Years active: 1973-present

Tahani Rached is a Canadian-Egyptian documentary filmmaker. She is best known for her work Four Women of Egypt. She has directed more than 20 documentary films in her career.

== Life and career ==
Tahani Rached was born on May 16, 1947, in Cairo, Egypt. In 1966, she moved to Montreal to pursue painting. She was a student at the École des beaux-arts de Montréal where she studied painting for two years. She became more involved with the community and thus, turned to filmmaking.

She was hired as a staff filmmaker by Canada's National Film Board in 1981. Rached however, left the Film Board in 2004 to return to Egypt to make films.

In 2023 she was named the recipient of the Prix Albert-Tessier for her career achievements.

Her filmography showcases social and political issues experienced around the world, with a special focus on diaspora communities. She often includes animation and songs in her documentaries.

When preparing to film a documentary, Rached spends several months with her subjects. Only after she feels that she has established a rapport does she begin the filming process. She believes this method to give an honest and spontaneous feel to her work, as well as instilling empathy in the audience.

== Selected filmography ==
- Pour faire changement (To Make a Change)
- Where Dollars Grow on Trees (Les voleurs de job) - 1980
- La phonie furieuse - 1982
- Beyrouth! Not Enough Death to Go Round - 1983

Filmed after the massacres of Palestinian and Lebanese Muslims in Sabra and Shatila, the documentary explores the suffering of people displaced by war. These refugees have been relocated to an abandoned western Lebanese resort town. Their daily life includes lining up for rations, dealing with the Red Cross, and trying to build homes out of rubble.

- Haïti (Québec) - 1985
- Bam Pay A! Rends-moi mon pays - 1986
- Haïti, Nous là! Nou la! - 1987
- Au chic resto pop - 1990

The documentary is about the people who run a soup kitchen in Montréal—Chic Resto Pop—which caters to the homeless and needy. The soup kitchen is located in Montréal's Hochelaga-Maisonneuve quarter. The film follows the workers' daily lives: rescuing food discarded by the grocery stores and restaurants to cook into 300 meals per day, talking to school officials about feeding disadvantaged children, and exploring the poor neighbourhoods around them. The documentary features songs which the workers themselves have composed, reflecting on the themes of their work—giving the documentary a sense of optimism in the face of hardship.

- Doctors with Heart - 1993

The documentary follows the efforts of doctors who care for AIDS patients in Montréal's activist Clinique L'Actuel. It is a French film with English subtitles, 110 minutes long. When it was shown at the 1994 Toronto Film Festival, it led to invitations to be played around and the CBC-TV requesting a one-hour English version of the film. Rached, who initially proposed the idea to the National Film Board ten years previously, said yes. She has a personal connection to AIDS, since one of her friends was diagnosed with and died of the disease. The documentary was filmed over the course of four months.

- Emergency! A Critical Situation - 1999
- Four Women of Egypt - 1997

The film shows four friends discussing social justice and human dignity under Nasser's regime. These women are different in their beliefs — Muslim, Christian, and nonbeliever — yet they sustain their friendship despite their differences. They speak frankly, listen, and laugh with each other. Their conversation makes connections between the private and political, recognising that history does not happen outside of the individual. The documentary was shown at the 1999 Berlin Film Festival.

- For a Song - 2001
- Soraida, a Woman of Palestine - 2004

The film tells the story of Palestinians living under Israeli occupation in the 1990s, focusing specifically on Soraida Abed Hussein and her family: husband Rifaat Sabah, daughter Rantia, and son Aram. It shows the injustice of the illegal occupation through curfews, internal displacement, house demolitions, and an apartheid wall which separates family owners from each other and landowners from their land. However, the Palestinians feel that the subjugation is not merely physical but also spiritual. The question the documentary asks is: how does one preserve one's humanity in the face of oppressive dehumanisation? Soraida's answer is to choose to see the humanity in everyone, even the Israeli soldier. She teaches her children to love each other, their family, and their land — even their names, Rantia and Aram, are the names of Palestinian villages, which Soraida chose so that the memory of the land will not die. Soraida chooses to "be free in thought, conscience, and spirit." There are multiple themes, such as the theme of how external violence can manifest internally: Israelis exact violence on Palestinians, Palestinian men exact violence on their wives and children, and young adults and children contemplate suicide; the theme of passive resistance: choosing to live one's everyday life despite the hostile eyes of the Israeli occupiers; and the theme of contradictions: such as sipping English tea while blaming the English for the Palestinian curse or expressing hatred for Israelis while still discussing how to come to a peaceful resolution.

The Arabic documentary with English subtitles was nominated for the best Québec Documentary in the 2004 Prix Jutra nominations.

- These Girls - 2005

The 66 minute long documentary follows the lives of a group of young homeless girls in Cairo. It explores the resilience required to live in fear of being raped, attacked, or kidnapped by men. Some of the girls even have scars on their faces from past attacks. Most of them are glue-sniffers which they supplement with pills. One girl, Abeer, was told that her father wants to kill her since she brought dishonour to the family by having a baby out of wedlock. The girls have a mother-figure in Hind, a kindly women who attempts to break the addiction of the girls.

The repetitive scenes in the documentary underscore the cyclical nature of living in the streets. The tight editing emphasises the volatility of emotions that the girls undergo, from breaking down in tears to fighting off men to dancing in the streets. The film has no analysis, and music (by Tamer Karawan) is added only sparingly to highlight moments of joy.

These Girls was shown at the 2006 Toronto International Film Festival. It was shown at a special screening at the Cannes Film Festival, in a noncompeting category. It is the first film produced by the newly resurrected Studio Masr.

- Neighbors - 2007

The documentary, focusing on the once-luxurious Garden City quarter of Cairo, explores the relationship between past and present relationships between Egypt and foreign governments. The Garden City was once inhabited by the wealthy but has since been encroached upon by the US Embassy, which has frustrated many local shop owners. Switching between shots of abandoned villas and the perimeter of the embassy, the film discusses the ways in which foreign governments continue to impose on the Egyptian people.
