= List of people from Ferizaj =

The following are notable people who were either born, raised or have lived for a significant period of time in Ferizaj.

== List ==
- Ajkune Ahmetaj, hairdresser and philanthropist
- Haki Xhakli, painter and university professor
- Genc Iseni, footballer
- Shefqet Pllana, ethnographer
- Laurit Krasniqi, footballer
- Shtjefën Kurti, priest
- Sefë Kosharja, Albanian military
- Hekuran Murati, politician, current Minister of Finance of Kosovo.
- Arsim Abazi, footballer
- Getinjo, Rapper , Brother of Mozzik
- Lucjan Avgustini, prelate
- Ljuba Tadić, Serbian actor
- Čika Mišo, shoeshiner
- Dardan Çerkini, footballer
- Naim Beka, KLA commander
- Egli Kaja, footballer
- Mozzik, rapper , brother of Getinjo
- Lorenc Antoni, composer, conductor and ethnomusicologist from Skopje, but lived in Ferizaj
- Ylber Ramadani, footballer
- Qëndrim Guri, cyclist, competed at the 2016 Summer Olympics
- Dodë Gjergji, Catholic prelate and current head of Caritas Kosovo, born in Viti, but lives in Ferizaj
- Bujar Lika, footballer
- Leard Sadriu, footballer
- Driton Selmani, visual artist
- Fifi, singer and songwriter
- Veli Sahiti, singer
- Astrit Fazliu, footballer
- Rreze Abdullahu, writer
- Nehat Islami, journalist
- Ramadan Ramadani, painter
- Regard, disc jockey
- Luàna Bajrami, actress, lives in France, but is born in the village of Pleshinë
- Fatmir Dalladaku, cardiac surgeon
- Loredana Zefi, singer
- Drilon Islami, footballer
- Dimal Basha, politician, former speaker of the Assembly of the Republic of Kosovo and current Minister of Infrastructure and Transport.
