= 2021 Stockholm International Film Festival =

Film festival edition in Sweden

- Location: Stockholm, Sweden
- Founded: 1990
- Awards: Bronze Horse (Rhino by Oleg Sentsov)
- No. of films: 100
- Festival date: 10–21 November 2021
- Website: stockholmfilmfestival.se/en

Stockholm International Film Festival
- 2020

The 32nd Stockholm International Film Festival took place on 10–21 November 2021 in Stockholm, Sweden.

Ukrainian crime drama film Rhino won the Bronze Horse, most prestigious award. Kenneth Branagh's Belfast won the Audience Award.

== Juries ==
=== Competition ===
- Sahraa Karimi, film director
- Ronnie Sandahl, director and screenwriter
- Kristina Åberg, journalist and film producer

=== FIPRESCI Award ===
- Esin Kücüktepepinar, film critic
- Rok Govednik, film critic
- Hsin Wang, film critic

=== Documentary ===
- Nathan Grossman, director
- Tora Mårtens, director
- Malin Hübert, producer

=== Short film ===
- Lovisa Sirén, screenwriter and director
- Hedda Stiernstedt, actress
- Arvin Kananian, actor

== Official selection ==
=== Competition ===
English title	Original title	Director(s)	Production countrie(s)
Azor		Andreas Fontana	Switzerland, France, Argentina
Ballad of a White Cow	قصیده گاو سفید (Ghasideh Gave Sefid)	Maryam Moghaddam, Behtash Sanaeeha	Iran, France
A Chiara		Jonas Carpignano	Italy, France, United States
Clara Sola		Nathalie Álvarez Mesén	Sweden, Costa Rica, Belgium, Germany
Feathers		Omar El Zohairy	Egypt, Netherlands, Greece, France
Hive	Zgjoi	Blerta Basholli	Kosovo, Switzerland, Albania
Jockey		Clint Bentley	United States
Luzzu		Alex Camilleri	Malta
Miracle	Miracol	Bogdan George Apetri	Romania, Czech Republic, Latvia
Our Men	Mon légionnaire	Rachel Lang	Belgium, France
Prayers for the Stolen	Noche de fuego	Tatiana Huezo	Mexico, Germany, Brazil, Qatar
Rhino	Носоріг (Nosorih)	Oleg Sentsov	Ukraine, Germany, Poland
Small Body	Piccolo corpo	Laura Samani	Italy, France, Slovenia
Ted K		Tony Stone	United States
The Hill Where Lionesses Roar	La colline où rugissent les lionnes	Luàna Bajrami	Kosovo, France
True Things		Harry Wootliff	United Kingdom

=== American Independents ===
English title	Original title	Director(s)	Production countrie(s)
First Date		Manuel Crosby, Darren Knapp	United States
Ma Belle, My Beauty		Marion Hill	United States, France
Mass		Fran Kranz	United States
Mayday		Karen Cinorre	United States
Old Henry		Potsy Ponciroli	United States
Queen of Glory		Nana Mensah	United States
Wild Indian		Lyle Mitchell Corbine Jr.	United States

=== Discovery ===
English title	Original title	Director(s)	Production countrie(s)
A Corsican Summer	I comete	Pascal Tagnati	France
Erasing Frank	Eltörölni Frankot	Gábor Fabricius	Hungary
Immaculate	Imaculat	Monica Stan, George Chiper	Romania
The Justice of Bunny King		Gaysorn Thavat	New Zealand
La Civil		Teodora Mihai	Belgium, Romania, Mexico
Libertad		Clara Roquet	Spain, Belgium
Moneyboys		C.B. Yi	Austria, France, Belgium, Taiwan
You Resemble Me		Dina Amer	United States, France, Egypt
Zero Fucks Given	Rien à foutre	Emmanuel Marre, Julie Lecoustre	France, Belgium

=== Documentary Competition ===
English title	Original title	Director(s)	Production countrie(s)
Babi Yar. Context		Sergei Loznitsa	Ukraine, Netherlands
Bring Your Own Brigade		Lucy Walker	United States
Cusp		Isabel Bethencourt, Parker Hill	United States
Ennio	Ennio: The Maestro	Giuseppe Tornatore	Italy, Belgium, China, Japan
Jane by Charlotte	Jane par Charlotte	Charlotte Gainsbourg	France
The Lost Leonardo		Andreas Koefoed	Denmark, France
Misha and the Wolves		Sam Hobkinson	Belgium, United Kingdom
Sabaya		Hogir Hirori	Sweden
The Story of Film: A New Generation		Mark Cousins	United States
Users		Natalia Almada	United States, Mexico

=== Icons ===
English title	Original title	Director(s)	Production countrie(s)
Belfast		Kenneth Branagh	United Kingdom
Benedetta		Paul Verhoeven	France, Netherlands
Between Two Worlds	Ouistreham	Emmanuel Carrère	France
C'mon C'mon		Mike Mills	United States
Costa Brava, Lebanon		Mounia Akl	Lebanon, France, Spain, Sweden, Denmark, Norway
Land		Robin Wright	United States, Canada
Next Door	Nebenan	Daniel Brühl	Germany
North Hollywood		Mikey Alfred	United States
Spencer		Pablo Larraín	Germany, Chile, United Kingdom, United States

=== Open Zone ===
English title	Original title	Director(s)	Production countrie(s)
Ahed's Knee	הברך (Ha'berech)	Nadav Lapid	France, Israel, Germany
Annette		Leos Carax	France, Germany, Belgium, Switzerland, Mexico
Brother's Keeper	Okul Tıraşı	Ferit Karahan	Turkey, Romania
Everything Went Fine	Tout s'est bien passé	François Ozon	France
Flag Day		Sean Penn	United States
The Hand of God	È stata la mano di Dio	Paolo Sorrentino	Italy
I'm Your Man	Ich bin dein Mensch	Maria Schrader	Germany
In Front of Your Face	당신얼굴 앞에서 (Dangsin-eolgul-apeseo)	Hong Sang-soo	South Korea
Parallel Mothers	Madres paralelas	Pedro Almodóvar	Spain
Paris, district 13th	Les Olympiades, Paris 13e	Jacques Audiard	France
Petite Maman		Céline Sciamma	France
The Power of the Dog		Jane Campion	United Kingdom, Australia, United States, Canada, New Zealand
The Souvenir Part II		Joanna Hogg	United Kingdom
Three Floors	Tre piani	Nanni Moretti	Italy, France
The Worst Person in the World	Verdens verste menneske	Joachim Trier	Norway, France, Sweden, Denmark, United States

=== Special Presentation ===
English title	Original title	Director(s)	Production countrie(s)
No Time to Die		Cary Joji Fukunaga	United Kingdom, United States
The Wheel of Time (episodes 1-2)		Uta Briesewitz, Wayne Yip, Salli Richardson-Whitfield	United States

=== Twilight Zone ===
English title	Original title	Director(s)	Production countrie(s)
A Banquet		Ruth Paxton	United Kingdom
Hellbender		John Adams, Zelda Adams, Toby Poser	United States
Limbo	智齒	Cheang Pou-soi	Hong Kong, China
The Medium	ร่างทรง (Rang Zong)	Banjong Pisanthanakun	Thailand, South Korea
Saloum		Jean Luc Herbulot	Senegal, Congo
The Scary of Sixty-First		Dasha Nekrasova	United States
Shepherd		Russell Owen	United Kingdom

== Awards ==
The following awards were presented during the 32nd edition:

- Best Film (Bronze Horse): Rhino by Oleg Sentsov
- Best Director: Tatiana Huezo for Prayers for the Stolen
- Best First Film: The Hill Where Lionesses Roar by Luàna Bajrami
- Best Actor: Serhii Filimonov for Rhino
- Best Actress: Ruth Wilson for True Things
- Best Script: The Hill Where Lionesses Roar by Luàna Bajrami
- Best Cinematography: Tim Curtin for A Chiara
- Best Documentary: Sabaya by Hogir Hirori
- Best Short Film: The Right Words by Adrian Moyse Dullin
- FIPRESCI Award: Petite Maman by Céline Sciamma
- Zalando Rising Star Award: Edvin Ryding

=== Lifetime Achievement Award ===
- Jane Campion

=== Achievement Awards ===
- Kenneth Branagh
- Robin Wright

=== Visionary Award ===
- Joachim Trier
