= Euphories =

2021 French pop album by Videoclub

Studio album by Videoclub
- Released: January 29, 2021
- Recorded: 2018–2021
- Studio: Petit Lion Productions, Nantes, France
- Genre: Electropop; synth-pop; French pop
- Language: French

Euphories is the only studio album by the French musical duo, Videoclub. The album was released on 29 January 2021 by the label, Petit Lion Productions. and consists of 13 songs, Including seven of their past singles, it opens with the 2018 song, "Amour plastique" and concludes with the 2021 song, "SMS," the final piece created by the duo.

The album's music has a "positive melancholic" 80s' and 90s' inspired theme to it and consists of a variety of musical styles such as synthpop and French pop. It's cover art is pastel melancholy aesthetic. At its peak, the album hit 30th on the FRA and 54th on the BEA (WA).

== Reception ==
Professional ratings
Review scores
Source	Rating
AllMusic	4/5 stars

Euphories generally received positive reviews. Mary Atkinson of The Independent stated, "The album possesses an impressive versatility which can particularly be seen in the track ‘Roi’, in which Matthieu takes a more prominent vocal role," she further complimented Reynaud's vocals with the statement, "Matthieu’s vocals fulfilling his part in almost a love letter or poem between the duo, demonstrating the variety of the duo’s musical talent with Matthieu’s usually seen in the composition and arrangement of their songs." Kylie Warrix of Totally Wired! Magazine stated, "There's something incredibly enchanting about this record. I have been a fan of VIDEOCLUB for quite some time now, so hearing the singles I’ve been playing on repeat be finally compiled into a full-length album is something truly special."

In 2022, "Amour plastique" being gaining internet attention, alongside songs such as "Le Festin" and "Tourners dans le vide," because of a surge of interest in French culture. The song further garnered attention on the internet, specifically on the site TikTok, in September, 2023, due to it being paired with an image on Napoleon Bonaparte on St. Helena stating, "There's nothing we can do," in a viral video.

== Track listing ==
All tracks are written by Adèle Castillon and Matthieu Reynaud.

No.	Title	Length
1.	"Amour plastique"	3:46
2.	"Euphories"	3:31
3.	"Suricate – ODZ"	3:15
4.	"Enfance 80"	3:42
5.	"Mai"	3:37
6.	"Trois jours"	4:00
7.	"Roi"	3:44
8.	"Polaroids"	3:09
9.	"En nuit"	3:43
10.	"What Are You So Afraid Of"	2:29
11.	"Petit Monde"	3:29
12.	"808"	2:59
13.	"SMS"	3:50
Total length:		46:18
