= Ahmetaj =

Ahmetaj is an Albanian surname. Notable people with the surname include:

- Alessandro Ahmetaj (born 2000), Italian footballer
- Ajkune Ahmetaj, Kosovo Albanian celebrity hairdresser and philanthropist
- Alvi Ahmetaj (born 1998), Albanian footballer
- Arben Ahmetaj (born 1969), Albanian politician
- Olta Ahmetaj (born 1987), Albanian choreographer and dancer
