= Culture in Ferizaj =

Ferizaj, in southeastern Kosovo, is its third-largest city and has a number of cultural attractions and activities. Composer Lorenc Antoni worked in the city during the early 1940s; another composer is Venqenc Gjini.

== Attractions ==
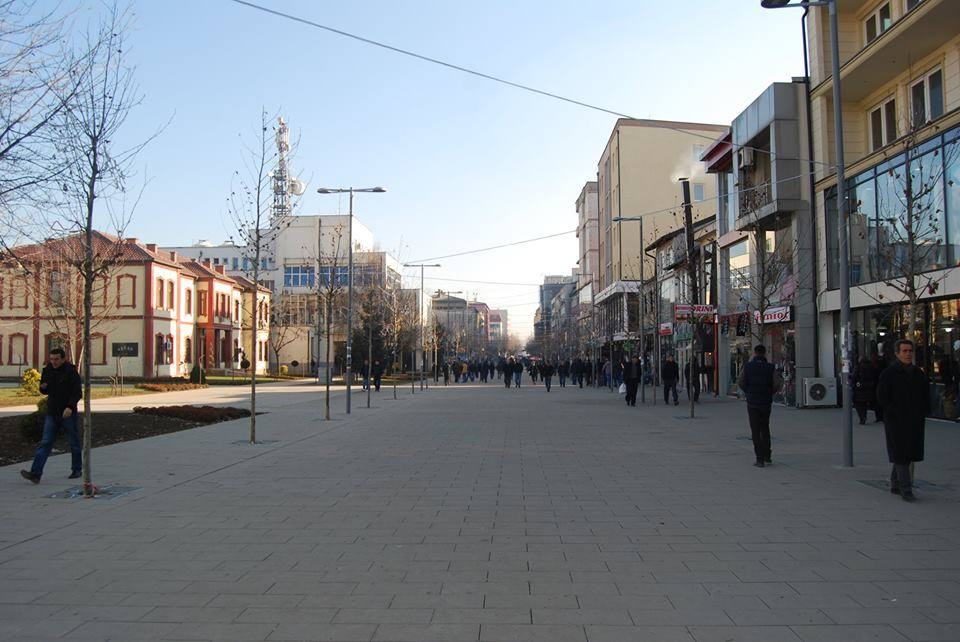
Pedestrian walk in Ferizaj

Ferizaj has a mosque and a Serbian Orthodox church in close proximity. Nearby are the city library, a park and a number of coffee shops.

=== Libraries ===
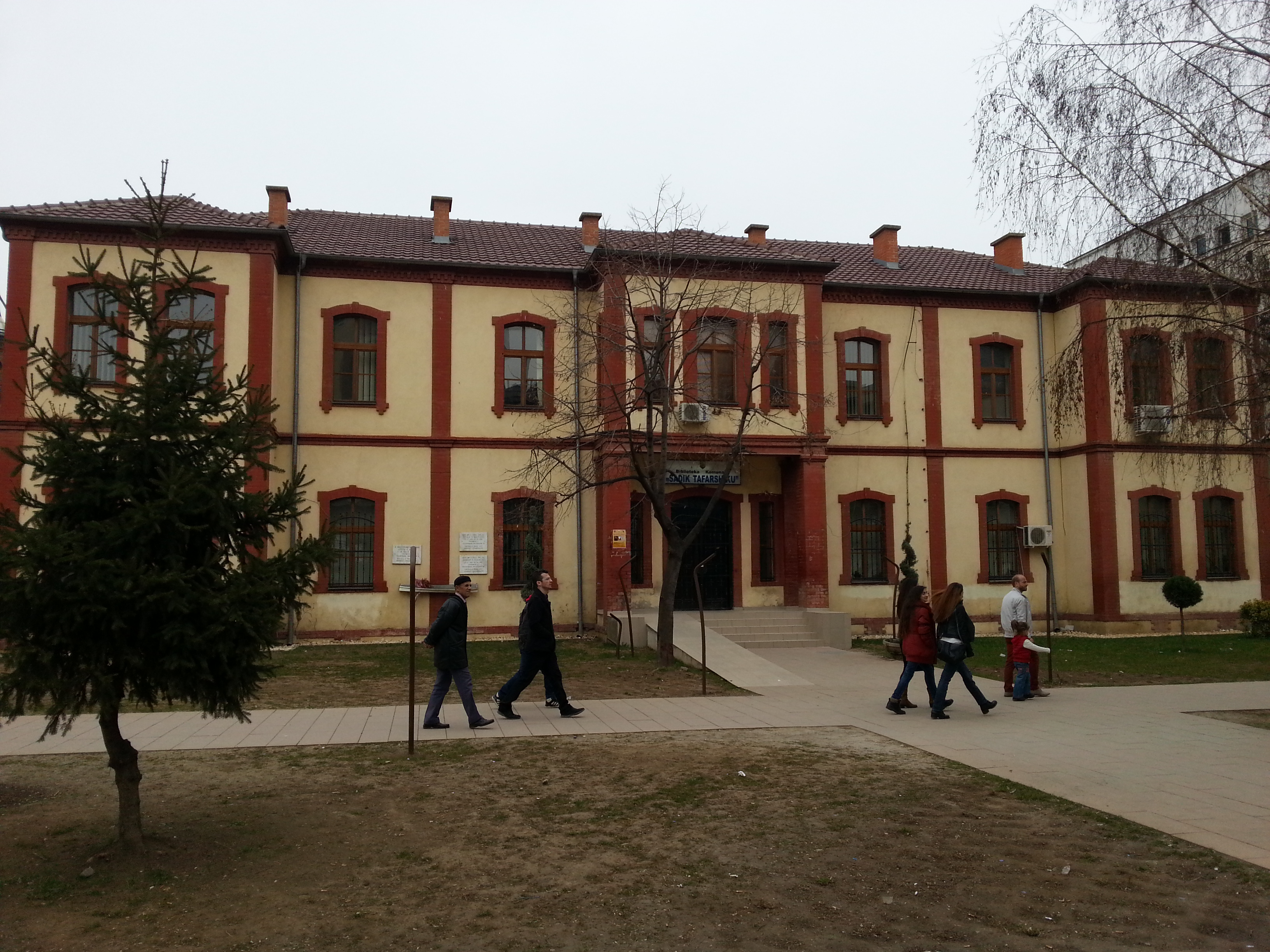
Sadik Tafarshiku Library

In 1950, the District of Ferizaj council founded the Miladin Popovic Library, which became Ferizaj's main library. Reading rooms opened in Talinovc Muhaxherve and Tankosiq in 1930, in the Old Village in 1934 and in Pojatisht and Kosine. During the Kosovo War, many libraries were destroyed. Immediately after the war, there were 8,334 books in the Anton Qeta Library before renovations. Ten computers were donated, and an internet network was installed. In 2005, the library had a total of 17,441 books.

The Sadik Tafarshiku Library, which opened on January 10, 2001, was funded by the city and the United States Agency for International Development and Save the Children. The library, which features exhibitions, scientific debates and literary hours, had 17,722 books and 1,252 members in 2005.

=== Nika’s Mill ===
Nika’s Mill, built during the 16th century, was demolished in the 1990s; €40,000 was allocated by the Ministry of Culture for its restoration. At this location is a square and a restaurant.

=== Mosque and church ===
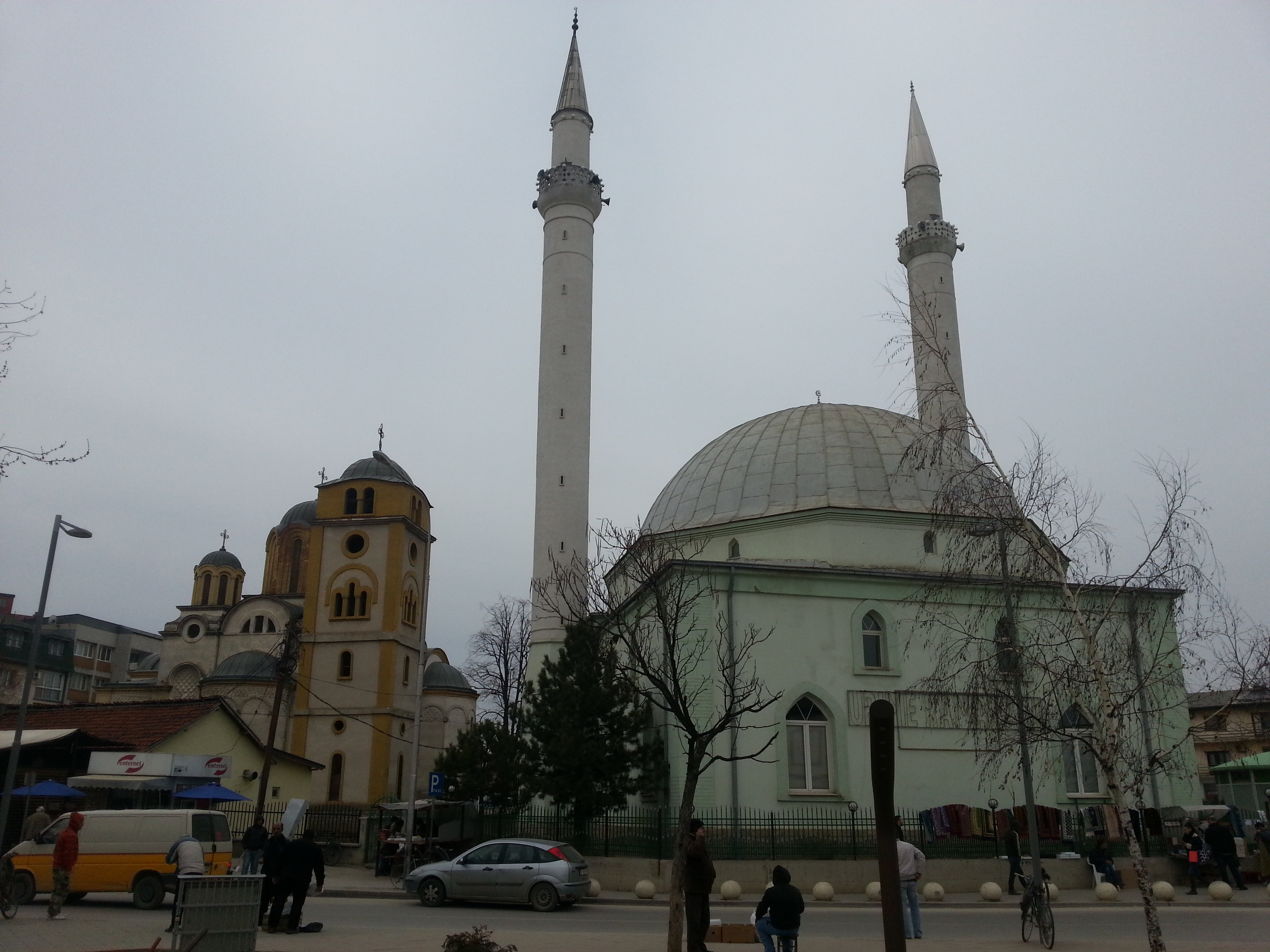
Mosque and Orthodox church next to each other

Ferizaj's first mosque, built in 1894 during the Ottoman period, was destroyed by German aerial bombing in April 1941. The construction of a new mosque began in 1942, and was completed the following year. The first minaret was built in 1957, and the second in 2003.

Construction of the Orthodox church began in 1928 by the Kingdom of Yugoslavia, and was completed in 1931. It was decided to build the church in the courtyard of the mosque; its proposed location was 100 metres (330 ft) from the current location, but due to poor building conditions the church was built facing the mosque.

== Goddess of Varosh ==
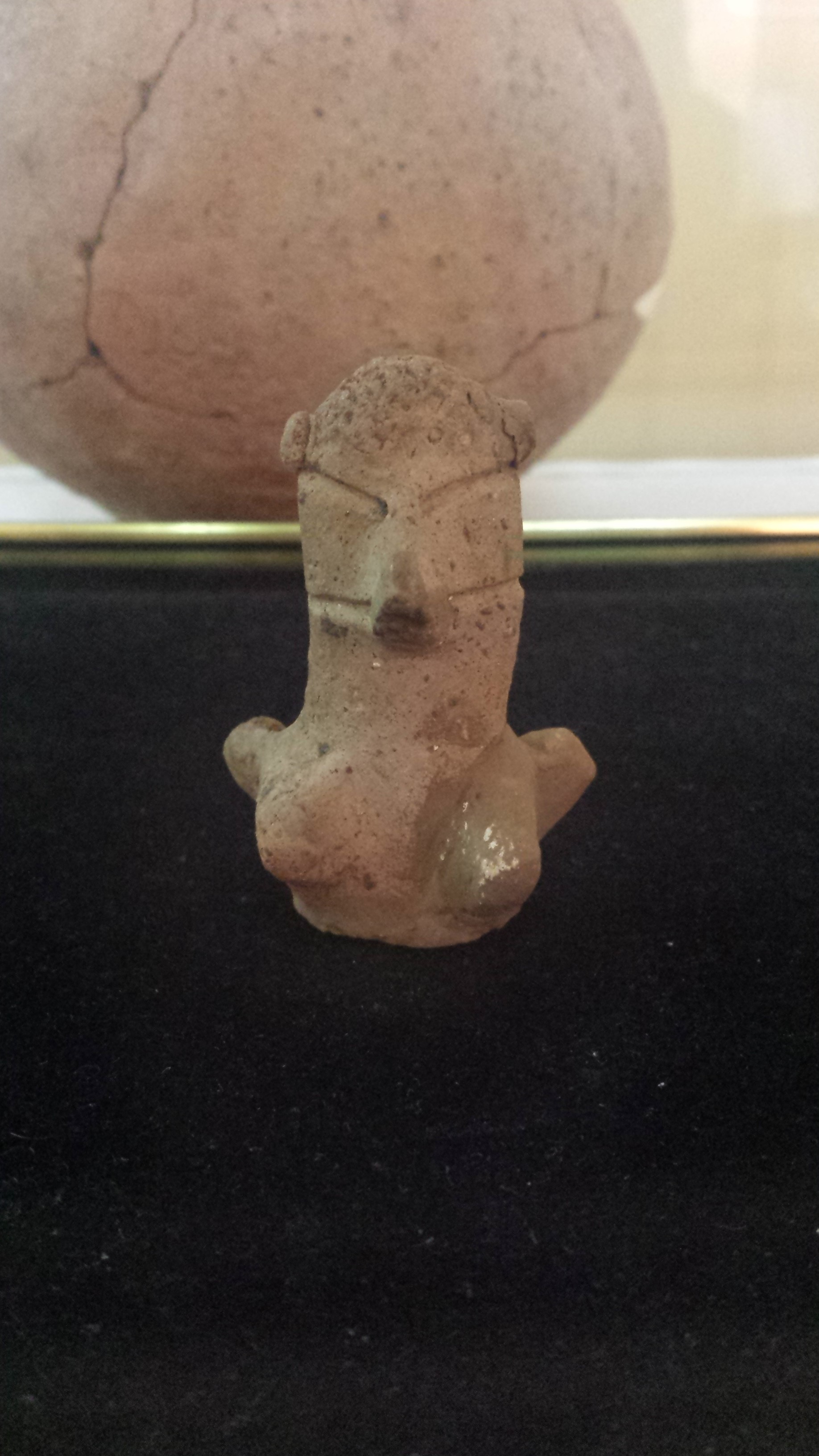
Goddess of Varosh

This antique figure is found in Varos, a prehistoric village in Ferizaj. The sun-baked ceramic figure, dating to the sixth millennium BC, indicates a cult of womanhood.

== Hotel Luboten mural ==
The Hotel Luboten mural was painted in 1960 by a Macedonian artist. The mural, in the city center, has become identified with Ferizaj.

== Music ==
Tonic and Trix are bands from Ferizaj. Trix was formed in spring 1974 with Veli Sahiti, Muhamet Bislimi and Nuredin Azemi. Other members are drummer Hil Prenk Palaj and Gjergj Prenk Palaj (harmonica). Sahiti, the leader of the group, is the only member to remain in Kosovo.

== Theater ==
Activities in Ferizaj were organized into cultural artistic associations (CAAs). The Ferizaj Theater, reportedly in operation since 1928, featured Lorenc Antoni in 1941. In 1943 Hasan Dyngjeri directed plays by Kristo Floqi, and in 1946 the Mustaf Bakija CAA was formed. The theater had a dance troupe with over 40 members. In 1955, a group of intellectuals founded Ferizaj's amateur theatre.

== Nightlife ==
Ferizaj is noted for its nightclubs, and the best-known are the Diamonds Club and the Coco Club. About 100 meters apart, DJs who have appeared there include DJ Tarkan, DJ Daddy K, David Vendetta and DJ Whoo Kid.

== Museum ==
Ferizaj's museum was founded in June 2011, and a director was appointed in August. Thanks to donations, the museum has over 800 exhibits. It has two sections: archeology and ethnology.

== Festivals ==
Ferizaj has had a number of festivals, including Ferfilm, the Festival of Theaters in Kosovo, Kastriotet and the Kosovarja Sings Festival. Ferfilm, an international film festival, was held in 2013. The Festival of Theaters in Kosovo has been held in Ferizaj since 1970.

In 1967, Kastriotet was founded. Professor and journalist Rexhep Rifati was its first president. During the spring of 1979, the group toured France, Belgium and Germany. The group reunited in 1993 with Shukri Hoxha. Kosovarja Sings began in 1972 to highlight feminine concerns.

== Gallery ==
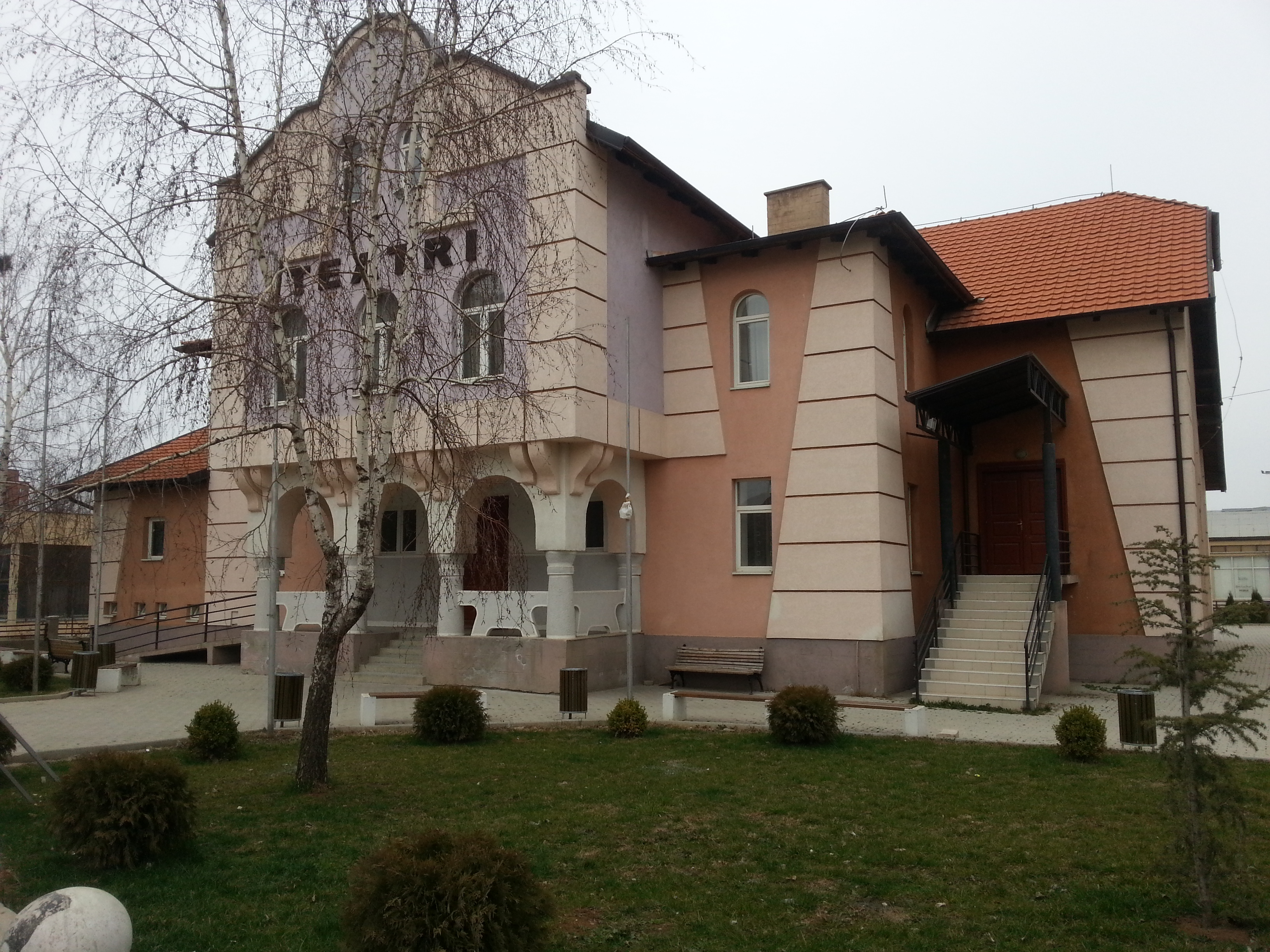
Ferizaj Theater

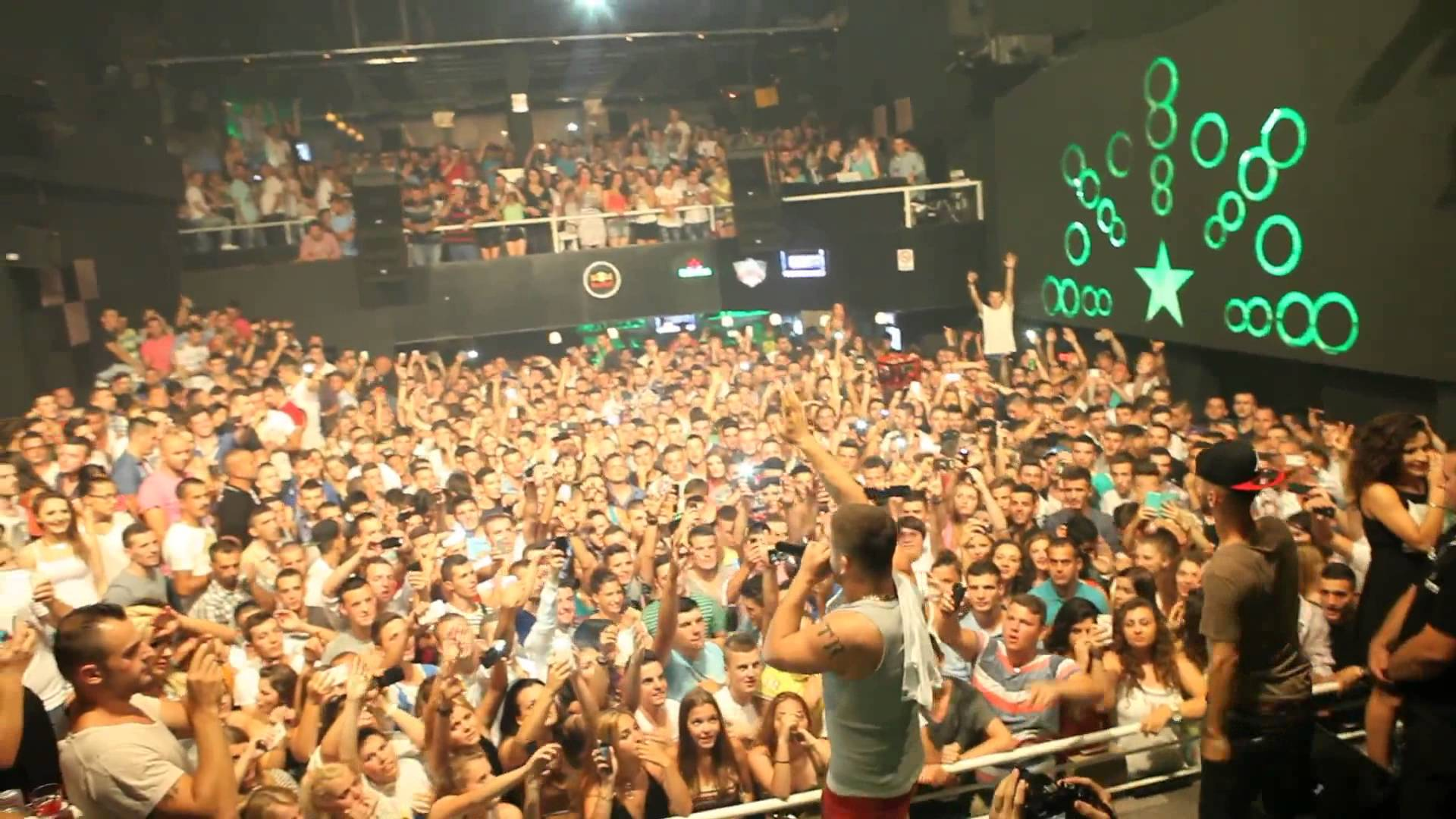
Coco Club

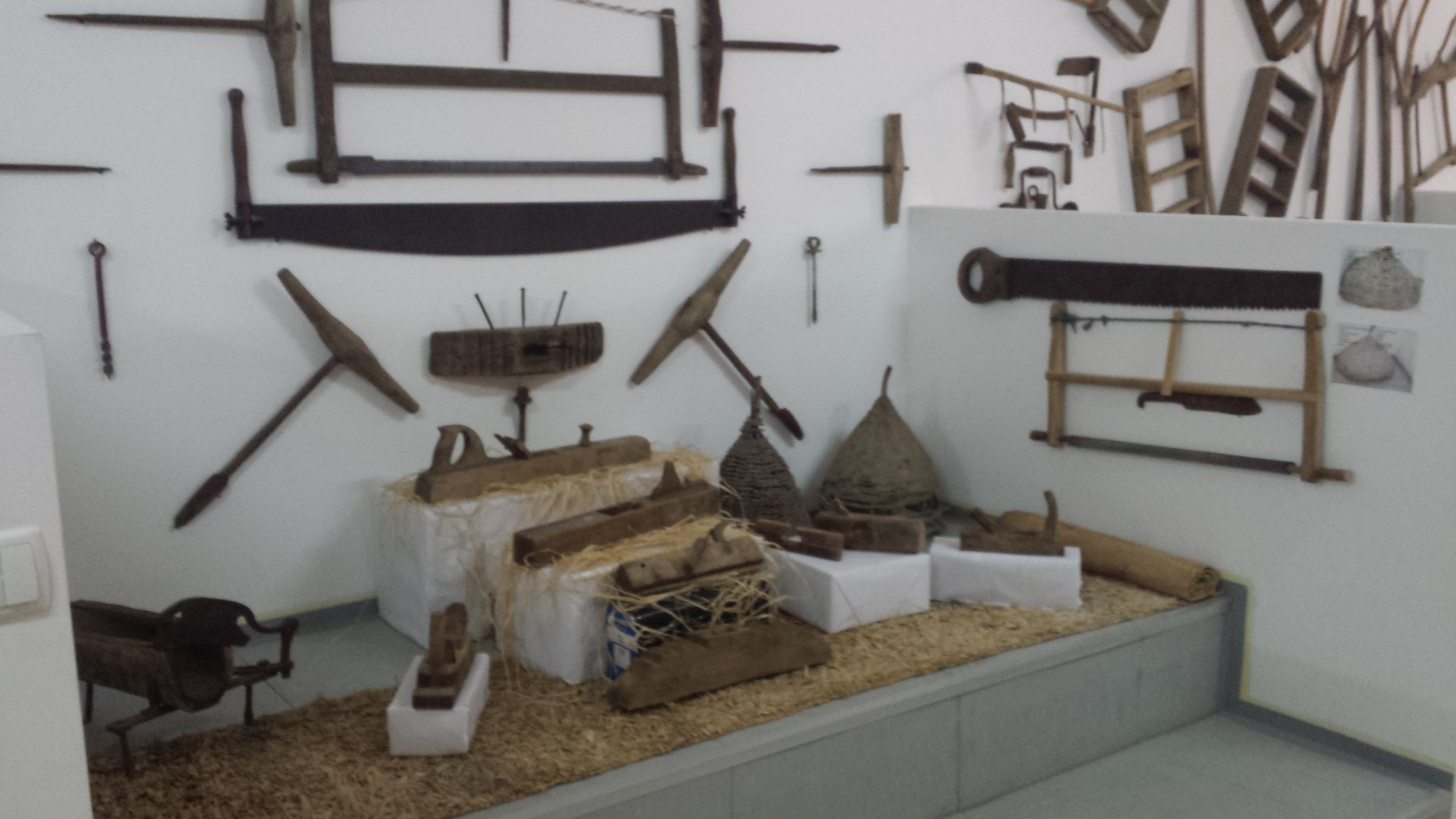
Agricultural tools

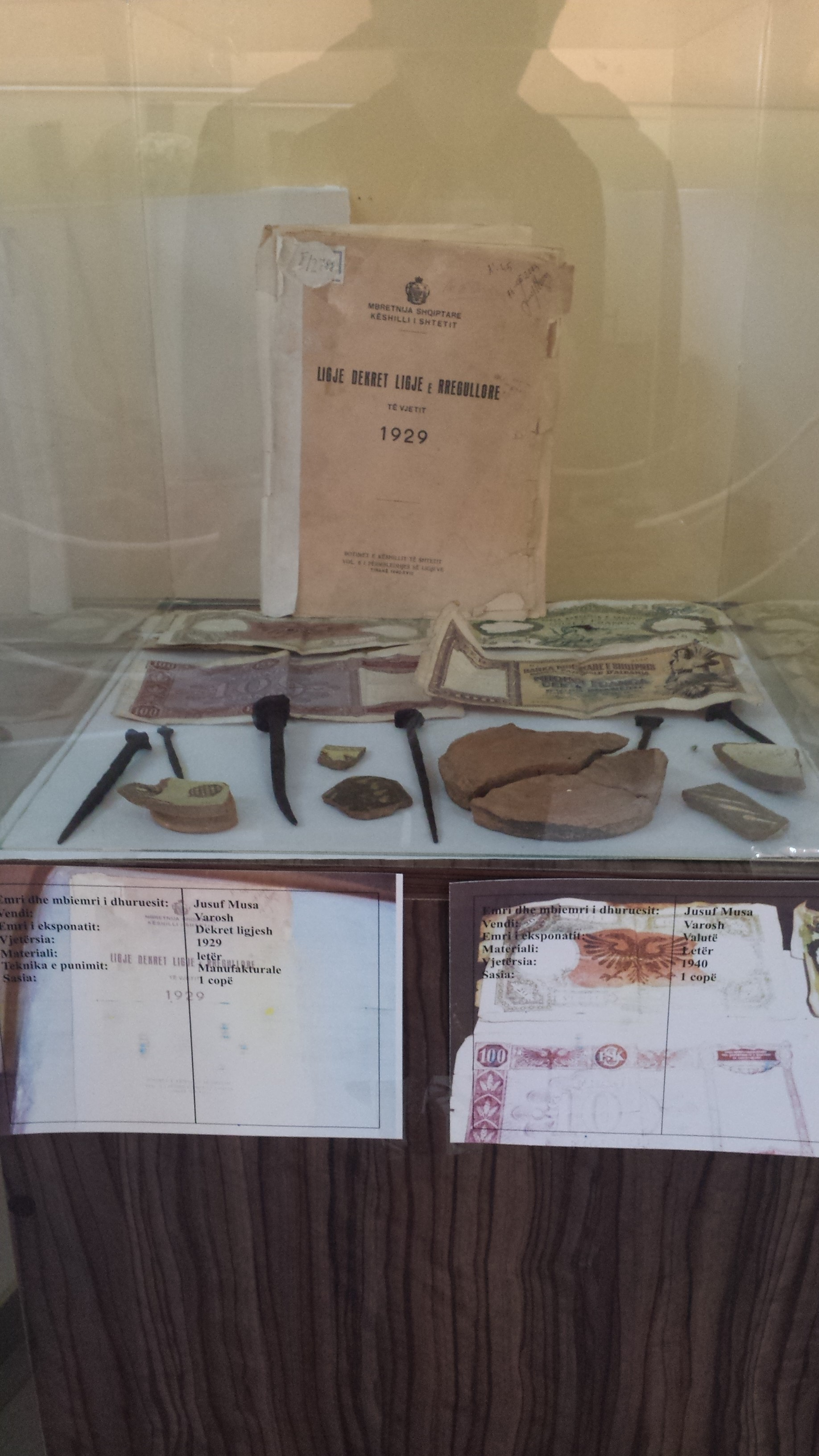
Museum exhibit

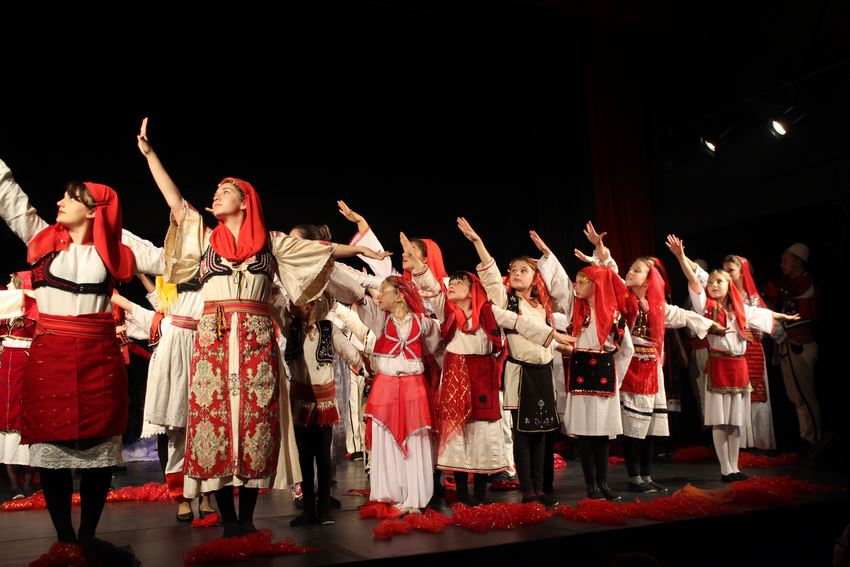
Festival in Kosovo
