= Videoclub =

French musical duo

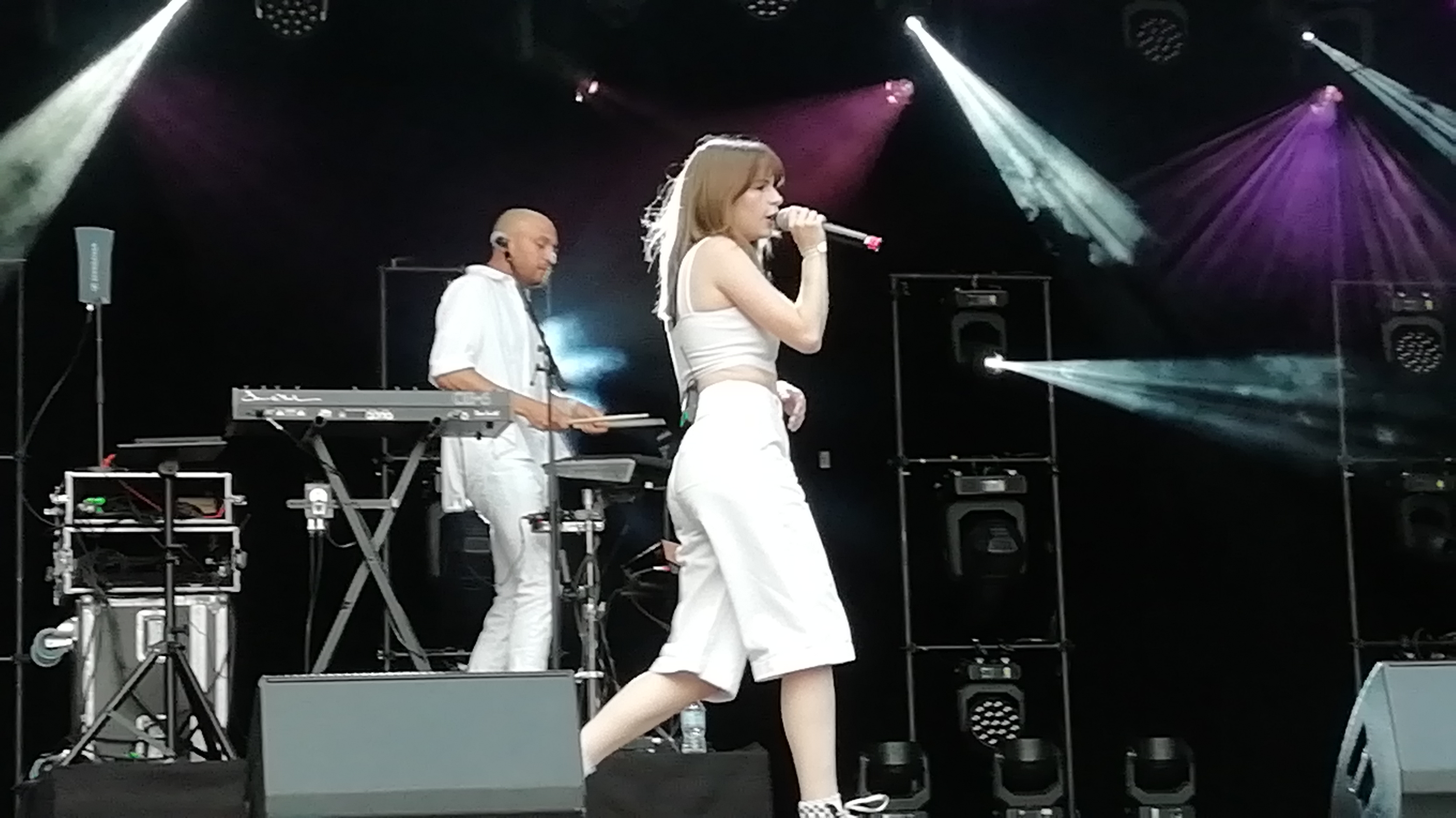
- Adèle Castillon of Videoclub performing in September 2021

Background information
- Origin: Nantes, France
- Genres: Electropop; synth-pop; French pop
- Years active: 2018–2021
- Labels: Petit Lion Productions; Sony Music
- Past members: Adèle Castillon; Matthieu Reynaud

Videoclub (stylized as VIDEOCLUB) was a French musical duo formed in Nantes, France, in 2018 by Adèle Castillon and Matthieu Reynaud. They became popular for the song "Amour plastique", and "Roi" released in September 2018 as the first two songs from the Euphories album.

Before Videoclub, Castillon was an actress with her own YouTube channel while Reynaud learned to produce music with his father, a musician.

The group's musical style is heavily influenced by 1980s music but draws inspiration from contemporary music as well. Musical artists Odezenne, Superbus, Fauve, Vendredi sur Mer, Dinos, Mac DeMarco, Tame Impala, and Chromatics have been cited as sources of inspiration for the group's music; in particular, Reynaud's guitar riffs were influenced by 1980s groups such as the Cure, New Order, and Pixies. The duo have also taken inspiration from Jacques Demy films for their lyrics.

Videoclub released seven singles, a collaboration, and a studio album, Euphories.

On 31 March 2021, the duo announced their disbandment after Reynaud left the band following the deterioration of their relationship. The duo released their final single, "SMS", and Castillon toured under the Videoclub name as a solo act before disbanding.

== Legacy ==
The song "Amour plastique" saw another resurgence in popularity on the internet, being first used on TikTok in a late September 2023 viral video. The video featured a despondent Napoleon Bonaparte saying "There is nothing we can do," in response to his defeat in the Battle of Waterloo and his second exile to St. Helena.

Songs "Roi", "Mai", "VHS", and "En nuit" all gained popularity from late 2023 onwards due to the rise of the blackpill community on Tiktok; this is because users used these songs as backing tracks for blackpill edits garnering millions of views, further popularizing the discography of Videoclub and adding to its fanbase. They also became associated with TikTok edits of the character Brian Moser from the TV series Dexter.

== Discography ==
=== Studio albums ===
Title	Details	Peak chart positions	
Title	Details	FRA	BEL (Wa)
Euphories	Released: 29 January 2021; Label: Petit Lion Productions, Sony Music; Formats: CD, LP, cassette, digital download	30	54

=== Singles ===
Title	Year	Peak chart positions		Album
Title	Year	FRA	BEL (Wa)	Album
"Amour plastique"	2018	—	—	Euphories
"Roi"	2018	—	—	Euphories
"En nuit"	2019	98	44	Euphories
"What Are You So Afraid Of"	2019	—	—	Euphories
"Mai"	2019	—	—	Euphories
"Enfance 80"	2020	—	—	Euphories
"Euphories"	2020	—	34	Euphories
"Enfance 80" (with Natalia Lacunza)	2020	76	—	Non-album single
"SMS"	2021	—	—	Euphories
