= Naim Beka =

Kosovo Liberation Army soldier

- Born: 5 September 1966; Pleshinë, Ferizaj, SFR Yugoslavia (today Kosovo)
- Died: 25 October 1999 (aged 33); Doganaj, Kaçanik, Kosovo under UN administration
- Military career
- Allegiance: (Republic of Kosova) Kosovo
- Branch: Kosovo Liberation Army; Kosovo Protection Corps
- Service years: 1998–1999
- Rank: Commander
- Nickname: Komandant Sokoli
- Conflicts: Kosovo War: Battle of Slivovë
- Awards: Hero of Kosovo

Naim Beka (5 September 1966 – 25 October 1999) was a renowned commander of the Kosovo Liberation Army and Logistics Commander of the Kosovo Protection Corps, who was killed under suspicious circumstances after the Kosovo War.

== Early life ==
Naim Beka was born on September 5, 1966, in the village of Pleshinë, located in the Ferizaj municipality of Kosovo. He completed his primary education in his hometown of Pleshinë and later attended technical high school in Ferizaj. During the 1980s, he was a member a Wrestling Club in Ferizaj and achieved notable success, earning both national gold and silver medals as a first-category wrestler.

In 1992, Naim married Zejnepe Reka. Together, they had two children, Amira and Advan. His early exposure to political unrest came at the age of 15 when, as a high school student, he participated in the mass demonstrations in Ferizaj in April 1981. These protests were aimed at resisting the social injustices, poverty, and systematic oppression imposed on Albanians by the Yugoslav regime.

== Military career ==
=== Involvement in the Kosovo Liberation Army ===
In May 1998, he traveled to his hometown, where he met KLA commanders Shukri Buja and Imri Ilazi at his uncle's house. During this meeting, Naim was officially accepted into the ranks of the KLA in the Nerodime Operational Zone. Alongside his uncle and other comrades, he assisted in recruiting and organizing individuals who were ready to join the KLA.

Upon receiving orders from the Command of the Nerodime Zone, Naim was stationed in the remote village of Jezerc, where he joined other KLA fighters. Throughout the Serbian offensives during the summer and fall of 1998, Naim was consistently present on the frontlines. As a member of the special unit within the Nerodime Operational Zone, he took part in several operations, where significant Serbian police forces were ambushed at a location known as "Kodra e Buqes" near the village of Nerodime. He also participated in the defense of the bodies of the Reçak Massacre victims in early January 1999.

One of his notable engagements was in the battle at the village of Slivovë in Ferizaj, where his comrades Driton Islami (Toni) and Sadik Bega (Murtaja) were killed. After the end of the War in June 1999, the KLA was transformed into the Kosovo Protection Corps, and Naim Beka was appointed as the logistics commander of the KPC.

== Death ==
On October 25, 1999, Naim Beka, along with fellow soldiers Agim Matoshi and Avni Shehu, was killed in an explosion near the village Doganaj, near Kaçanik. The event occurred a few months after the conclusion of the Kosovo War, during a raid operation. The soldiers had entered the house rigged with explosives, unaware of the danger, leading to their deaths. Three other individuals were severely injured in the explosion.

The exact circumstances surrounding the incident have not been fully investigated. While the event has been commemorated as part of their service, with the fallen being described as having "died in the line of duty" the nature of the mission remains unclear, as it occurred months after active hostilities had ceased.

His death and the following serial assassinations and suspicious deaths of former key-figures of the KLA, like Besim Mala or Tahir Zemaj after the Kosovo War, remain an unsolved enigma in the early history of Kosovo under International Administration.

== Legacy ==
Naim Beka's family has been honored with numerous awards and recognitions from various institutions, including the Ministry of Defense of the Provisional Government of Kosovo, the Nerodime Operational Zone or the municipality of Ferizaj. In 2017, the president of the Republic of Kosovo, Hashim Thaçi, decorated 108 fallen soldiers of the KLA and other personalities with the order “Hero of Kosovo”, among the 108 decorated were Naim Beka and Driton Islami.

On the 44th anniversary of Naim Beka's birth, a statue in his honor was unveiled in a prominent area of Ferizaj. The event was attended by a large number of citizens from Ferizaj and neighboring cities. Beka's legacy continues to be remembered as a symbol of the fight for Kosovo's independence and the pursuit of justice.
