= Rhino (film) =

- Ukrainian: Носоріг
- Directed by: Oleg Sentsov
- Screenplay by: Oleg Sentsov
- Produced by: Denys Ivanov; Oleg Sentsov; Dariusz Jabłoński; Violetta Kamińska; Izabela Wójcik; Heino Deckert; Tina Börner
- Starring: Serhii Filimonov; Yevhen Grygoriev; Alina Zevakova
- Production companies: Cry Cinema (Ukraine); Apple Film Prod. (Poland); Ma.ja.de. Fiction (Ger.)
- Distributed by: WestEnd Films
- Release date: September 9, 2021 (Venice)
- Running time: 101 minutes
- Countries: Ukraine; Germany; Poland
- Language: Ukrainian
- Budget: ₴50.0 million (€1.6 million)

Rhino (Ukrainian: «Носоріг», romanized: Nosorih) is a 2021 drama film written and directed by Oleg Sentsov, created as a co-production of Ukraine, Poland and Germany.

The world premiere of Rhino took place on September 9, 2021, at the 78th Venice Film Festival in the Orizzonti section.

== Plot ==
A young man grows up in a rural Ukrainian village. Coming of age in the 1990s, he is a delinquent and petty thug. He is forced to join the Ukrainian mafia for protection after a smaller mafia-associated gang, led by a man called "Skull", threatens his family. Now that they are both under the same organization, Skull cannot touch him. He is nicknamed "Rhino" by his boss for his headstrong nature.

Rhino rapidly adjusts to criminal life, acting as hired muscle in a variety of tasks, such as protection rackets, abductions, arson, and targeted killings. He prospers, earning a steady wage, earns subordinates of his own, and marries his pregnant girlfriend in a lavish wedding ceremony.

Now in his thirties, Rhino and his gang are largely autonomous; the larger mafia organization lets them act without consequences as long as they provide a consistent cut of profits. Rhino becomes increasingly disillusioned as his gang becomes more violent and the relationship with his wife and child deteriorates.

A special prosecutor is sent from the capital to build a case against Rhino and other mafia members. He offers Rhino a plea deal in exchange for being an informant, but instead Rhino is paid by the organization to assault him and destroy the records of mafia members. After Rhino and his gang have a drunken orgy to celebrate the massive payday, his wife and child leave him, and are killed in an automobile accident. An increasingly paranoid and callous Rhino deteriorates, taking on even more violent jobs while falling into drug addiction as escapism.

While high and hallucinating, Rhino assaults members of Skull's gang. Deciding to break the truce between mafia-affiliated gangs, Skull abducts Rhino, and hammers nails through his feet, pinning him to the floor of a barn. After the torture, Rhino takes the chance to kill Skull, before ripping his feet from the ground and escaping.

After recovering in the hospital, Rhino learns that he has become a fugitive. The other members of his gang are dead or missing, and their stash has been emptied. He meets with one of his mafia contacts to secure cash and a pistol, which he uses to kill the rest of Skull's gang who are driving his stolen car. He smuggles himself to Germany, and works as a laborer. One of his missing gang members shows up and attempts to convince Rhino to return; suspicious, he lures him out to the forest. Discovering that his friend is actually part of a hit squad, Rhino kills and buries them, sparing his friend who promises to lie that the mission was successful.

Still tormented by his dead wife, Rhino returns to Ukraine, and recounts his life story to a mysterious man, the framing device of the film. The man reminds him of a suppressed memory; he had killed a child when he eliminated Skull's gang. Rhino, reflecting on the mysterious man's words, realizes he has nothing left in his life. Provoking a pair of thugs on the street, they stab him repeatedly as he names all the people who died because of his actions. Mortally wounded, he crawls to find a scattering of his family photos on the pavement, which he embraces as he dies.

== Cast ==
Serhii Filimonov	Rhino
Yevhen Chernykov	Man in the car
Yevhen Grygoriev	Plus
Alina Zevakova	Marina
Mariia Shtofa	Rhino's sister
Iryna Mak	Rhino's mother
Serhii Smiian	Rhino's father
Dmytro Lozovskyi	Rhino's brother
Ivan Tamashev	Middle Rhino
Dmytro Dima	Little Rhino
Oleksandr Rudynskyi	Red
Yevhen Svitlychnyi	Karas
Serhii Maydebura	Meat
Vladyslav Derduha	Scull
Georgiy Povolotskyi	Tucha
Vitaliy Tyutenko	Chicha
Volodymyr "Adolfych' Shamray	Dad

== Production ==
=== Budget ===
In July 2020, Ukraine's Council for State Support of Cinematography made a decision to support the Rhino film project – funding received from the Ukrainian State Film Agency was ₴25 million, which amounted to about 50% of the film's total budget of ₴50 million (€1.6 million). Overall the film has received ₴46 million (€1.45 million) in funding from governmental film institutions which represents around 92% of the overall budget of ₴50 million (€1.6 million); speficifcally, the Ukrainian State Film Agency contributed 50% (₴25 million / €800,000), the Council of Europe's Eurimages Fund contributed 17% (₴8.6 million / €270,000), the Polish Film Institute contributed 15% (₴7.5 million / €232,600 / 1 million zł), and the German film fund Medienboard Berlin-Brandenburg contributed 10% (₴4.8 million / €150,000).

=== Screenplay ===
The story centers around a gangster Rhino, who's trying to survive Ukraine's "wild 90s". In August–September 2021 in his interviews for Deadline Hollywood and The Hollywood Reporter Sentsov confessed that he decided to make a movie about Ukraine's wild crime-infested 90s because he believes that to date "[Ukraine hasn't made any] movies about the “wild” 90s". Sensov also shared that the prototype for the film's main character, Rhino, was one of Sentsov's friends.

=== Filming ===
In 2012 film's director and writer Oleh Sentsov presented Rhino film project at the industry platform of the Sofia International Film Festival, where it received awards for Best Project and Best Pitching. Additionally in 2012 Sentsov presented Rhino film project at the producer pitching meeting of Odesa International Film Festival where the project won a grant of ₴25 thousand. However, work on the film was suspended in 2014 due to Sentsov's illegal arrest by Russian security services and his subsequent incarceration. Work on the project only resumed after Oleh Sentsov was released by Russia in September 2019 as a part of Russia-Ukraine prisoner exchange.

Filming began in July 2020 and ended in December 2020 and took place in Kryvyi Rih, Lviv and Kyiv.

The film is a co-production of Ukraine, Poland and Germany. The Ukrainian side of production is represented by producer Denys Ivanov's Arthouse Traffic and Oleh Sentsov's Cry Cinema. Polish partners are Apple Film Production, German – Ma.ja.de. film company. The international distributor of the film is WestEnd Films.

== Marketing ==
=== Promotion ===
On September 6, 2021, industry publication cineuropa.org released the first official international film poster. A day later on September 7, 2021, industry publication Deadline released the first official international film trailer. Fostylen magazine called the trailer impressive.

== Release ==
The world premiere of Rhino took place on September 9, 2021, at the 78th Venice Film Festival in the Orizzonti section; it was the closing film of the Orizzonti section.

== Reception ==
=== Critical response ===
Rhino has an approval rating of 78% on review aggregator website Rotten Tomatoes, based on 9 reviews, and an average rating of 7/10.

=== Awards and nominations ===
- Venice Film Festival — Orizzonti Section, Nomination: Best Film
- Batumi International Art-House Film Festival — International competition, Nomination: Best Film; Winner: Best Actor (Serhii Filimonov)
- Warsaw Film Festival — International competition, Nomination: Best Film
- Thessaloniki International Film Festival — Open Horizons, Non-Competition
- CPH PIX — The Wild Side, Non-Competition
- Stockholm International Film Festival — International competition, Winner: Best Film, Best Actor (Serhii Filimonov)
- 52nd International Film Festival of India — International Panorama, Non-Competition
- Les Arcs Film Festival — Playtime, Non-Competition
- Ulsan International Film Festival — UIFF Premiere, Non-Competition
- Sofia International Film Festival — Special screening, Non-Competition
- Taipei Golden Horse Fantastic Film Festival — Fantasy of the Year, Non-Competition
- International Istanbul Film Festival — International competition, Nomination: Best Film
- D'A Film Festival — Transicions, Nomination: Audience Award
- Transilvania International Film Festival — TIFF For Ukraine, Non-Competition
- Lubuskie Lato Filmowe — Main Competition, Winner: Best Film
- Aegean Film Festival — Feature films, Non-Competition
- Motovun Film Festival — Main Program, Nomination: Best Film
- Atlàntida Mallorca Film Festival — Official Competition, Nomination: Best Film
