= Pleshinë =

Village in Kosovo

- Village
- Location within Kosovo Location within Europe
- Coordinates: 42°20′40″N 21°6′24″E
- Country: Kosovo
- District: Ferizaj
- Municipality: Ferizaj

Population (2024)
  - Total: 4,421
- Time zone: UTC+1 (CET)
  - Summer (DST): UTC+2 (CEST)

Pleshinë is a village in Ferizaj Municipality, Kosovo. According to the Kosovo Agency of Statistics (KAS) from the 2024 census, there were 4,421 people residing in Pleshinë, with Albanians and Ashkali constituting the majority of the population. A notable person from Pleshinë is Luàna Bajrami (born 14 March 2001) is a French actress. She is known for her roles in the films Portrait of a Lady on Fire (2019) and School's Out (2018). She made her directorial debut with The Hill Where Lionesses Roar (2020).
