= A Difficult Year =

2023 French comedy film

- Theatrical release poster
- French: Une année difficile
- Directed by: Éric Toledano; Olivier Nakache
- Written by: Éric Toledano; Olivier Nakache
- Produced by: Nicolas Duval Adassovsky
- Starring: Pio Marmaï; Noémie Merlant; Jonathan Cohen; Mathieu Amalric; Grégoire Leprince-Ringuet; Luàna Bajrami
- Cinematography: Mélodie Preel
- Edited by: Dorian Rigal-Ansous
- Music by: Grandbrothers
- Production companies: Quad; Ten Cinéma; Gaumont; TF1 Films Production
- Distributed by: Gaumont
- Release date: 18 October 2023
- Running time: 103 minutes
- Country: France
- Language: French
- Box office: $6.9 million

A Difficult Year (French: Une année difficile) is a 2023 French comedy film written and directed by Éric Toledano and Olivier Nakache.

The film centres on Albert (Pio Marmaï) and Bruno (Jonathan Cohen), two friends with compulsive spending habits who are drawn into environmental activism by the promise of free food and beer rather than any political conviction.

The cast also includes Mathieu Amalric, Luàna Bajrami, James Gaspar De Almeida, Jean-Louis Garçon, Grégoire Leprince-Ringuet, Noémie Merlant, Héléna Mogelan, Marie Papillon, Sophie Parel, Julie Tessier and Gaïa Warnant.

== Cast ==
- Pio Marmaï as Albert
- Noémie Merlant as Valentine "Cactus"
- Jonathan Cohen as Bruno
- Mathieu Amalric as Henri
- Grégoire Leprince-Ringuet as Quinoa
- Luàna Bajrami as Antilope

== Production ==
A Difficult Year was produced by Quad and Ten Cinéma, in co-production with Gaumont and TF1 Films Production.

== Distribution ==
The film was screened at the 2023 Cannes Film Market, and had preview screenings in Clermont-Ferrand and La Valette-du-Var, in advance of its official commercial premiere in October.

The film had its international premiere in the Special Presentations stream at the 2023 Toronto International Film Festival.

The film was theatrically released on 18 October 2023 by Gaumont.

== Reception ==
A Difficult Year received an average rating of 3.1 out of 5 stars on the French website AlloCiné, based on 35 reviews.

Robert Daniels of Screen International gave the film a skeptical review. Though praising acting of Marmaï and Cohen, he noted overall shallowness of the film's heroes, and criticized the plot twists as implausible.
