= Nehat Islami =

Kosovar journalist

Nehat Islami (born 1943 in Ferizaj, Albanian Kingdom during World War II) is a journalist from Kosovo.

Nehat Islami

== Career ==
Nehat Islami graduated from the University of Zagreb Faculty of Law in 1966 . He began his journalistic career in “Rilindja,” the only daily newspaper of that time published in Albania and in Kosovo. A year later he moved to the RTP newsroom (Radio Television of Pristina). From 1974 to 1979, he was the Middle East newspaper correspondent in Beirut. After returning to Pristina, he was appointed Editor of Foreign Policy. He remained in that position until mid-1990 when “Rilindja” was banned by the Serbian authorities. From 1999 to 2002, he was the Project Manager of the Institute for War and Peace Reporting - office in Pristina. Since 2005, he directs the Office of the Press Council of Kosovo.

== Work ==
During his journalistic career, Nehat Islami has interviewed prominent world personalities, such as: Mother Teresa, Yasser Arafat, French poet Jasques Prevert, Croatian writer Miroslav Krleza, the president of Iraq Talabani, and the King of Jordan Hussein. He is the author of over 200 TV reportages and documentaries and thousands of press reportages and articles from Kosovo and abroad. In December 2013 in Pristina, Kosovo the Publishing House Koha published his first book “Hotel Bejruti” (Hotel Beirut). The book is in Albanian and is a summary of Nehat Islami’s journalistic reports and analyses from Middle East. His second book “Një adresë në Bukuresht” (An address in Bucharest) was published in 2016, a summary of articles and interviews collected within a period of 40 years.
