= Matthieu Reynaud =

French singer

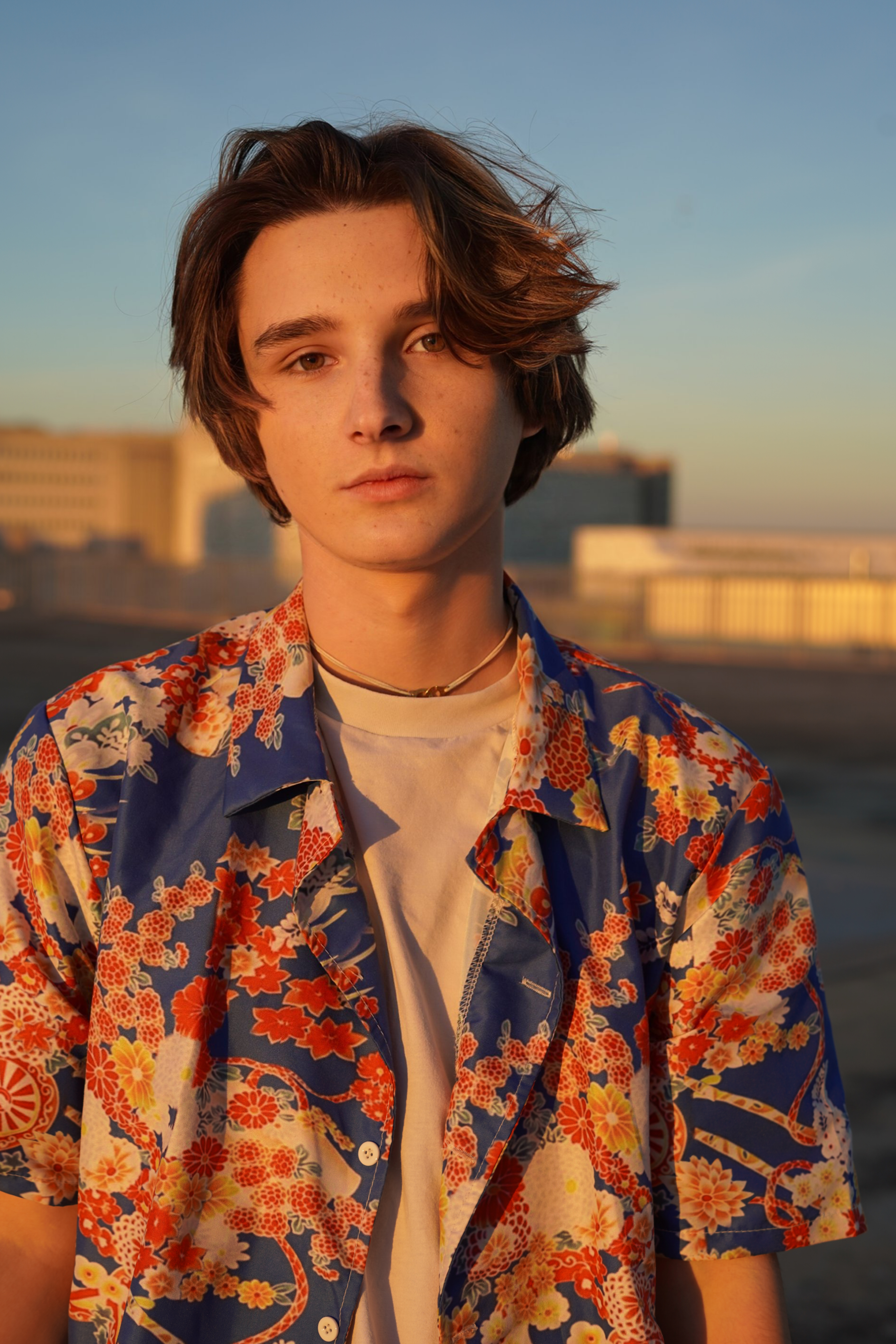

Background information
- Born: Matthieu Reynaud; 3 November 2001 (age 25); Nantes, France
- Origin: Nantes, France
- Genres: Electropop; Synthpop; Synthwave
- Occupations: Singer; songwriter; producer; composer; musician
- Instruments: Vocals; keyboards; guitar; bass; drums
- Years active: 2017–present
- Partner: Adèle Castillon (2018-2021)

Matthieu Reynaud (French pronunciation: [matjø ʁeno]; born 3 November 2001), known by his stage name of Mattyeux, is a French singer-songwriter, record producer, and musician. He was the singer and primary producer for the French pop duo Videoclub with Adèle Castillon, from 2018 until 2021.

== Early life and career ==
Reynaud was born in Nantes, France on 3 November 2001. He is the son of French composer Régis Reynaud and has one sister, Julie. During his adolescence, he became interested in music and learned to play several instruments.

In 2018, Reynaud met Adèle Castillon and formed Videoclub. Their songs "Amour plastique" and "Roi" went viral on TikTok and other social media, gaining over 890 million streams on Spotify. The band dissolved on 31 March, 2021 after Reynaud and Castillon's working and personal relationship deteriorated.

In 2022, he began a solo career under the stage name Mattyeux.

In 2024, he released his first solo album "Mirages". The album describes his relationship with Adèle Castillon. The album featured guest musicians TheFrenchKris, Satine Wallé, Princess Chelsea, Furtive and Eden Elf.

In 24th May 2025, he began his first solo Tour with at first a show in Paris this night at La Maroquinerie, the show was sold-out. The tour continues in cities like Lille, Nantes, Chelles and Mulhouse in France and with 4 dates in Germany in March 2026.
