= Jezerc =

Village in Ferizaj, Kosovo

Jezercë Kushtrim
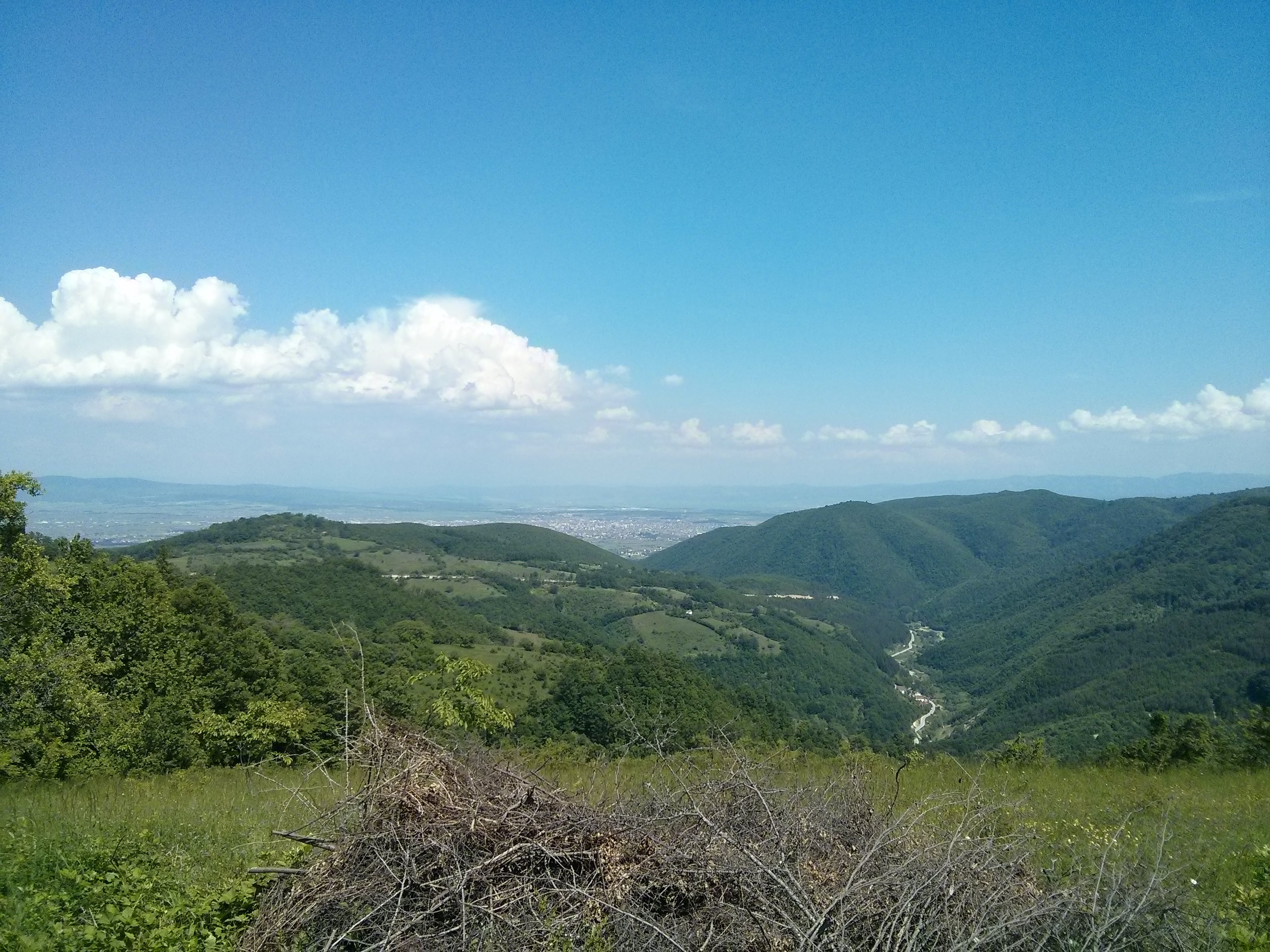
- Interactive map of Jezercë
- Coordinates: 42.3604°N 20.9883°E
- Country: Kosovo
- District: Ferizaj
- Municipality: Ferizaj
- Elevation: 764 m (2,507 ft)

Population (2024)
  - Total: 157
- Time zone: UTC+1
  - Summer (DST): UTC+2

Jezerc is a village in the Ferizaj municipality of Kosovo that has also been known since 1999In the eastern part of the municipality, it is one of the largest townships by area anywhere in Kosovo. The rural settlement has been scarcely excavated but what has been completed as shown settlement

== Etymology ==
Several explanations for the etymology of Jezercë have been given. The most elaborate dates to the massacres of Albanians in the Balkan Wars. According to village elders, the locals dammed a river to create a small reservoir that could be flooded if Serbian forces invaded through it, which would submerge the already occupied village of Nerodimë e Poshtme as well. The plan failed as a local Serb woman had tipped off the army to not march through the Jezer (ital) ("Albanian lake").

== Demographics ==
Urbanization has drained the village population, slowing infrastructure development until very recently.

Date	1948	1953	1961	1971	1981	1991	2011	2024
Population	1434	1515	1630	1666	1621	1778	454	157

== Culture ==
=== Gallery ===
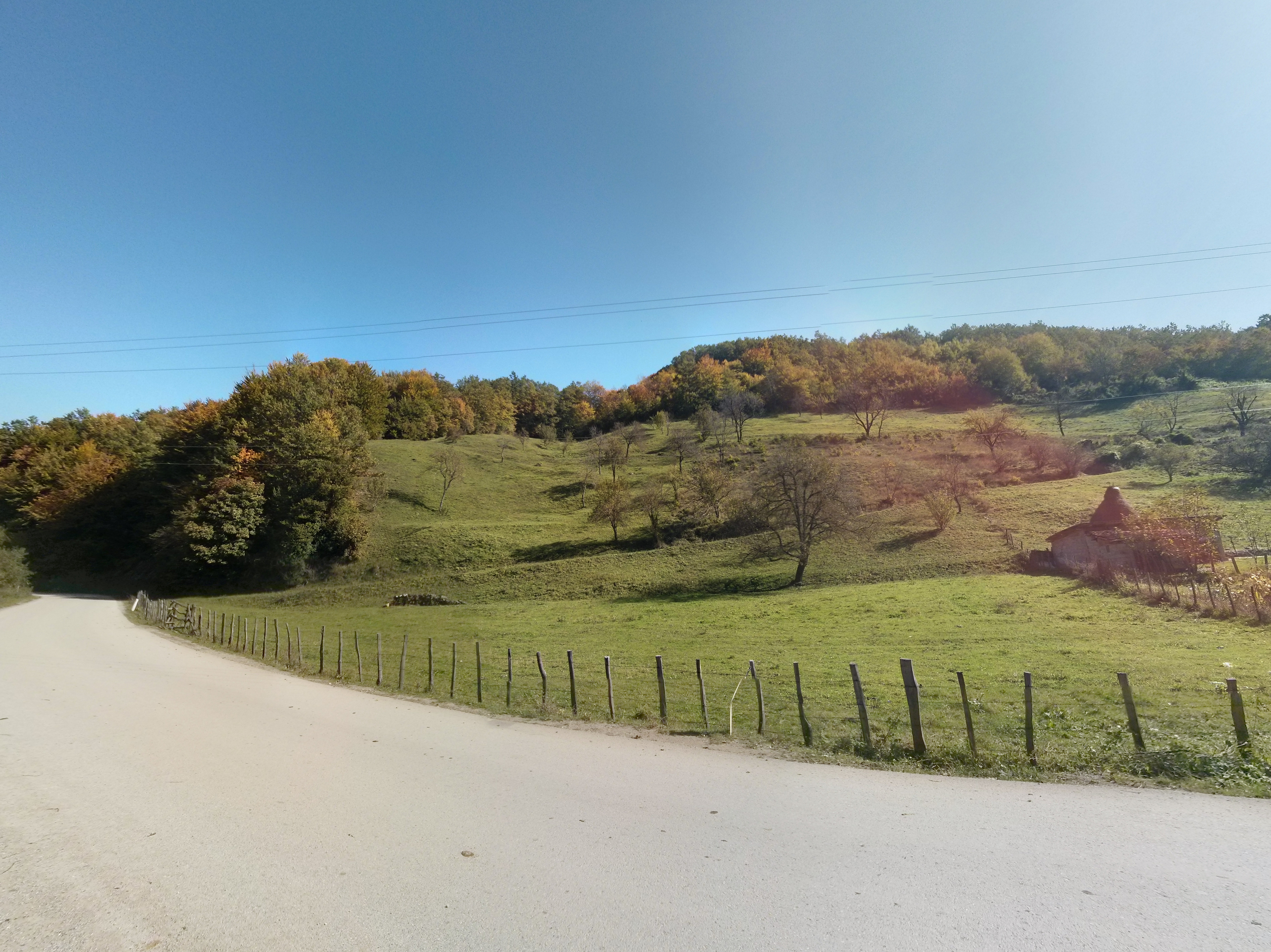
View from the village, October 12, 2014

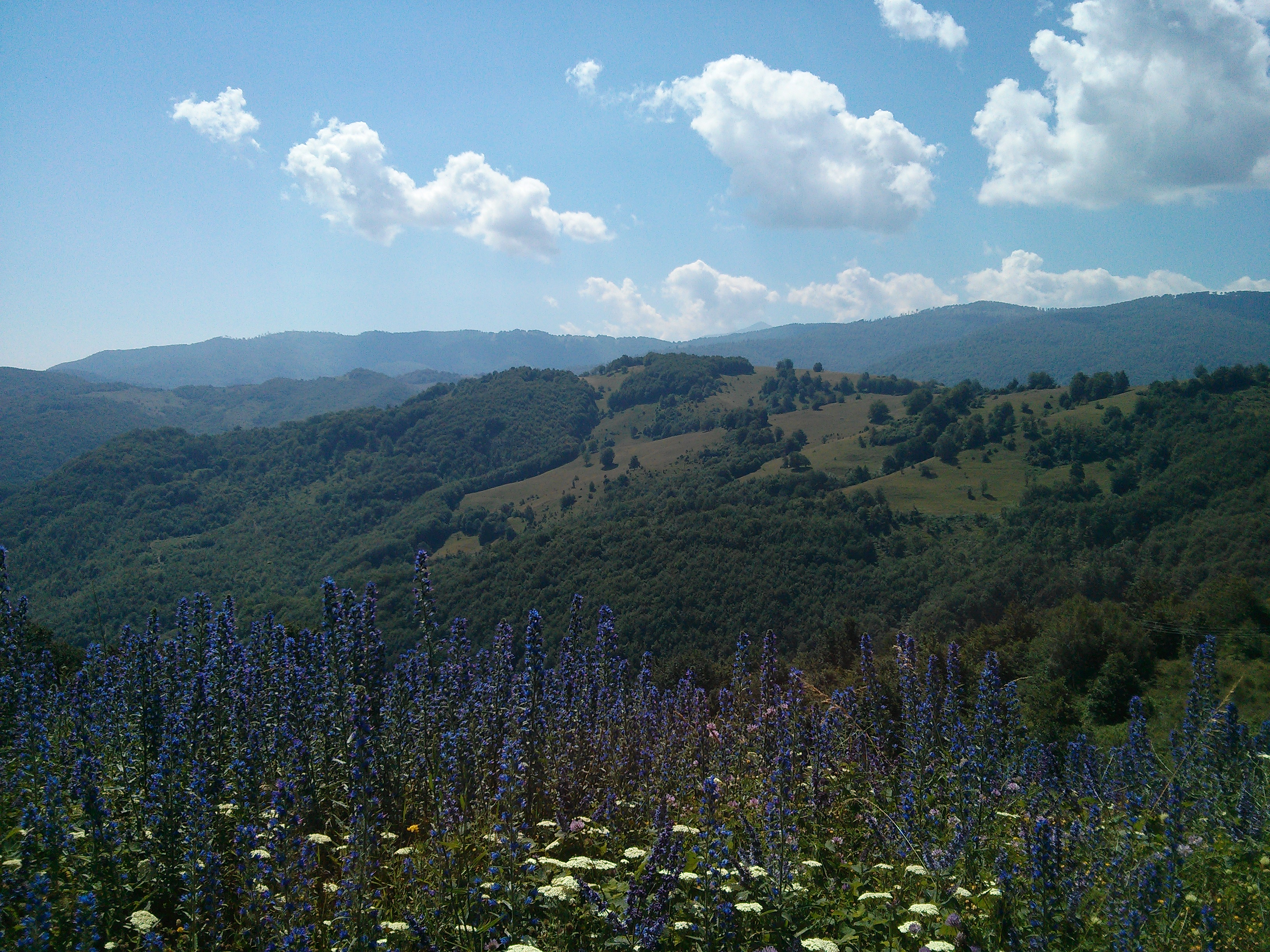
View from the village, June 29, 2014

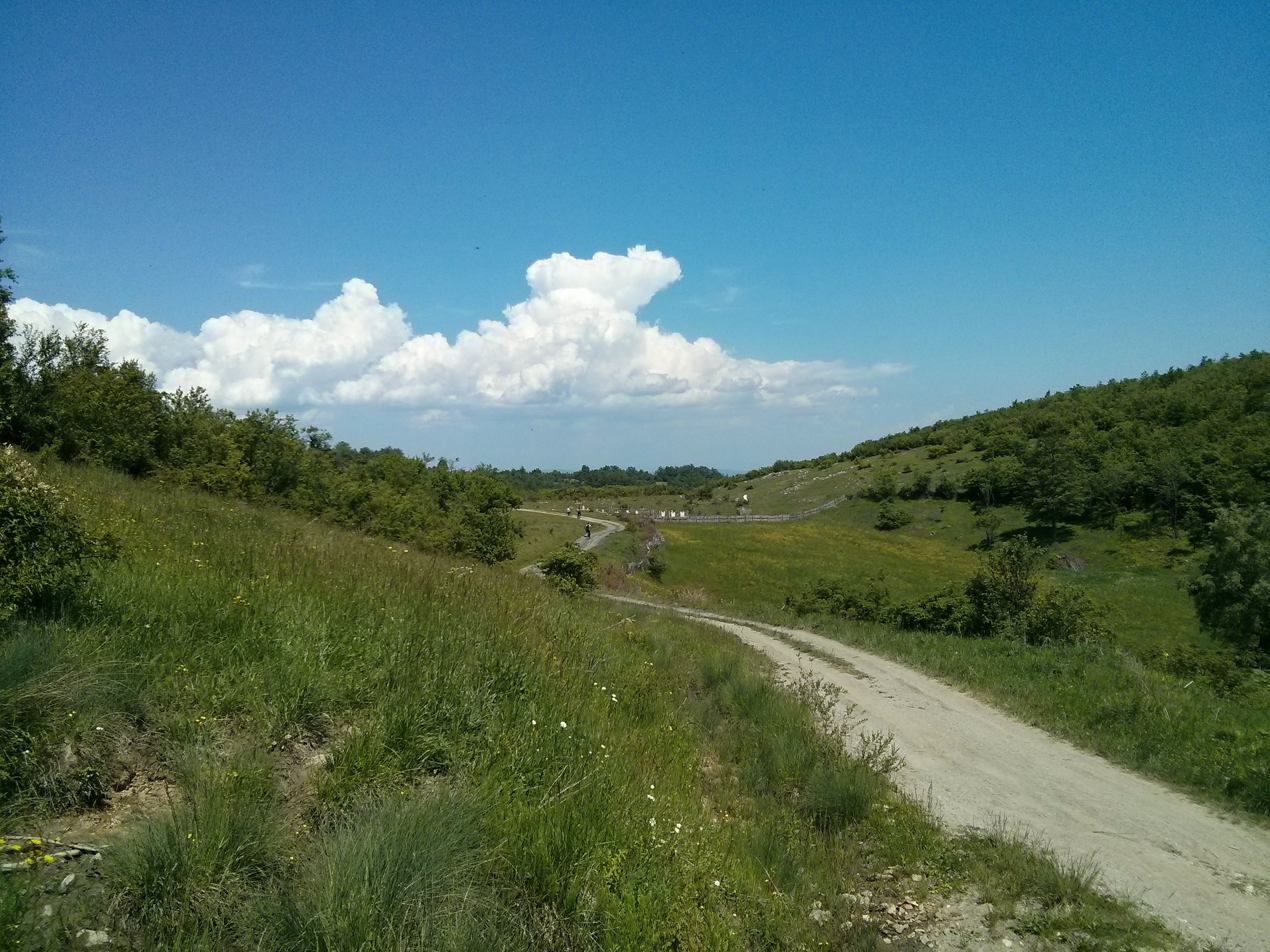
View from the village, May 21, 2015

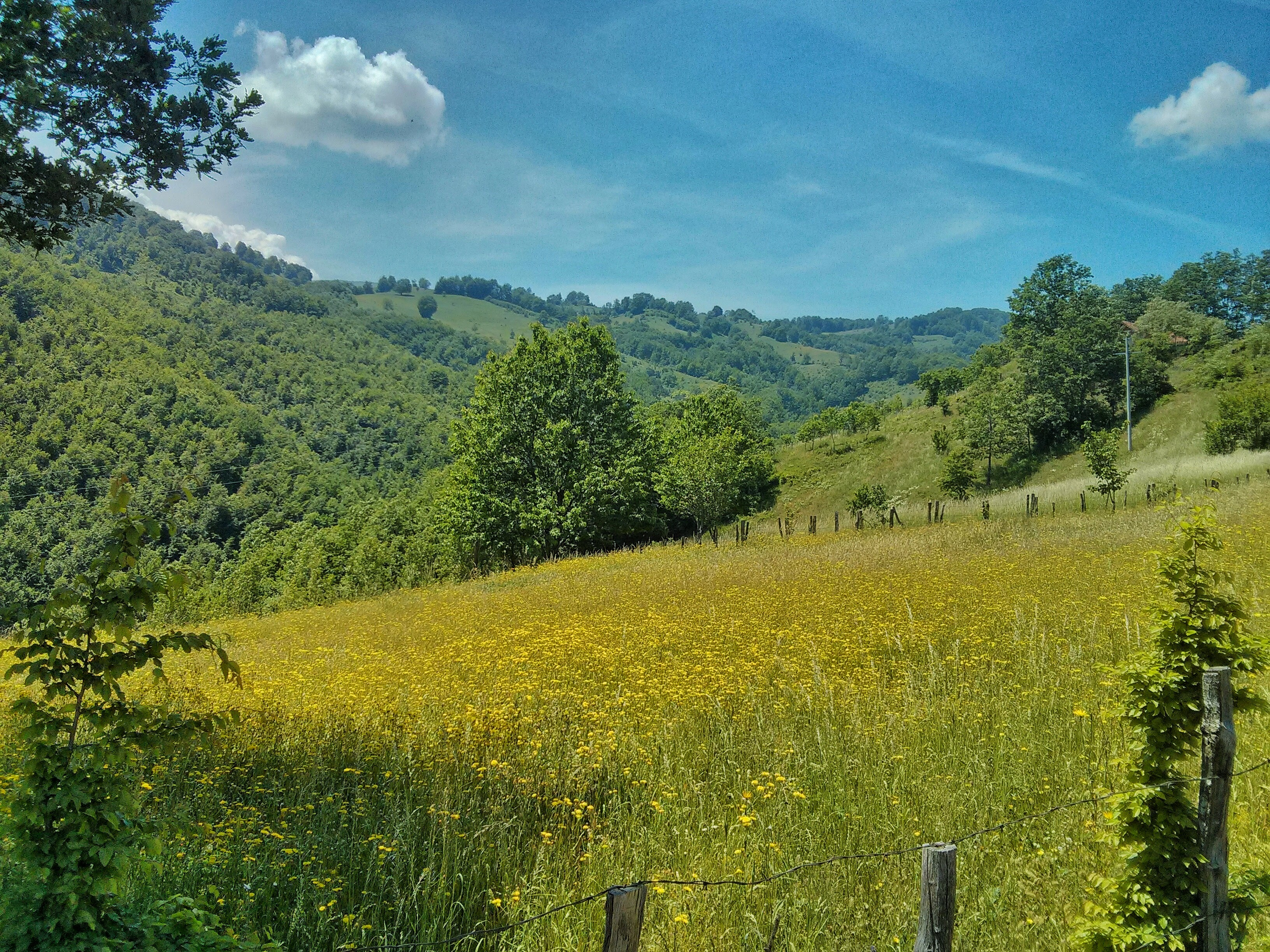
View from the village, May 31, 2015

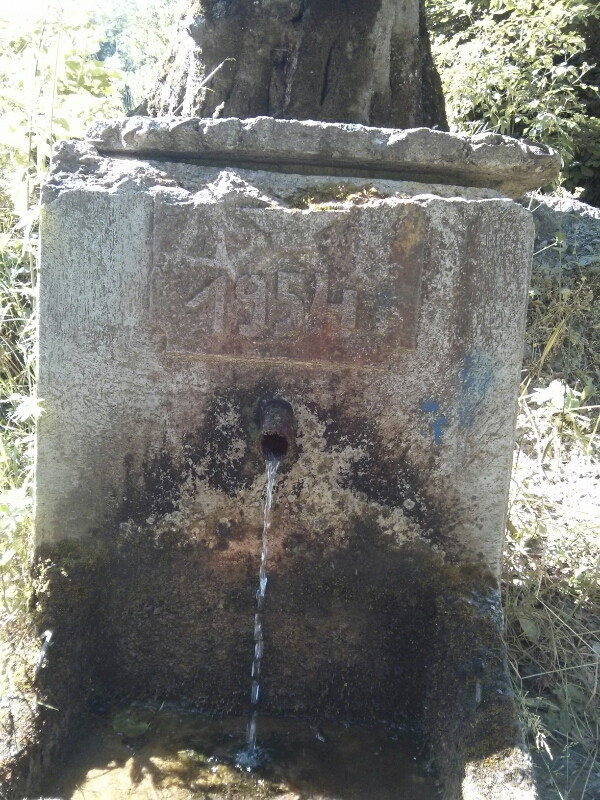
Town fountain, built in 1954

=== Tourism ===
Tourism has developed rapidly in the mountainous village, including cycling and hiking through the local meadows and springs. Recreational general aviation, mountaineering, equestrianism, hunting, fishing, and skiing are all popular in the vicinity.

== History ==
=== Kosovo War ===
From 25 to 28 September 1998, during the Kosovo War, Yugoslavian forces launched an assault against Kosovo Liberation Army forces near Nerodimë e Poshtme. Three Serbian units (located in Shushicë, Burrnik, and Semajë) surrounded Jezerc, starting their assault with heavy shelling from their bases as well as such other locations as a nearby river confluence, Mt. Buq, the pine forests of Štimlje and Dulje, a radio antenna overlooking the town, the Pleshinë Water Tower, and the Ferizaj barracks. The KLA's southern élan, the Nerodime Operational Zone, coordinated their response with the Kaçanik unit. Well-armed infantry and support engineers followed the artillery fire, streaming in from Nerodime and attacking from KLA positions 1 in Dramjak, 2 in Mollopolcë, and 3 in Budakova. Position 6 took heavy artillery fire, and ultimately attrition took its toll until the Nerodime brass for Ferizaj and Kaçanik beat a tactical retreat to the forest guard barracks below the village and onward to the Sharanik meadow. On 28 September, the bloody climax ensued, pitting 400 lightly armed fighters in the KLA Zone unit against thousands of Yugoslavian military and paramilitary forces, killing three captains in the Serbian secret police and dozens of others while wounding many more.
