= Ajkune Ahmetaj =

Kosovar hairdresser

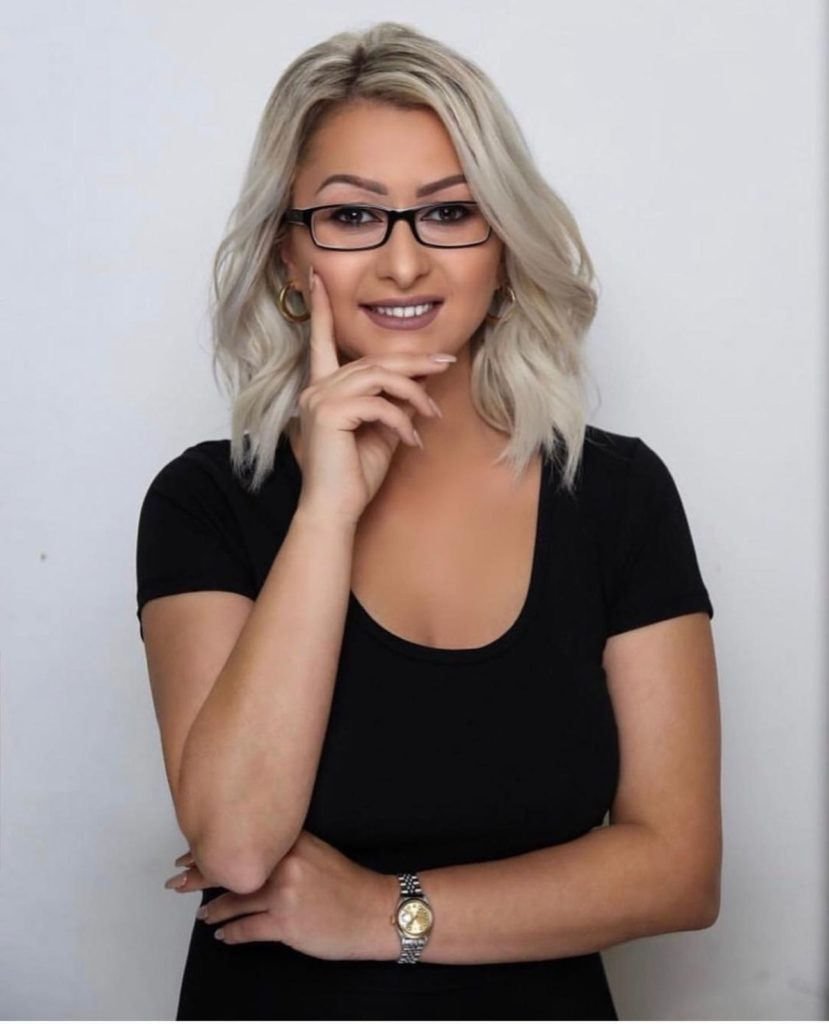
- Born: Ajkune Ahmetaj; Jezerc, Ferizaj, Kosovo
- Occupation: Hairdresser
- Years active: 2006–present

Ajkune Ahmetaj is a Kosovar celebrity hairdresser and philanthropist based in Switzerland. She is the first Albanian hairdresser who has developed her signature hairstyling products and cosmetics. Notable clients include Tayna, Kida, Rina, Dafina Zeqiri, Genta Ismajli, and Elvana Gjata.

== Early life ==
Ajkune Ahmetaj comes from Jezerc, Ferizaj, Kosovo. She lived in Kosovo with her grandparents until the Kosovo War, when she moved in Switzerland to live with her parents.

== Career ==
In 2006, Ajkune Ahmetaj started working as a hairdresser while attending a three-year professional course on hairdressing. After she completed the course, she opened her first salon in Gränichen, Switzerland. Gradually, she became one of the best-known Kosovo Albanian hairdressers and began working with Kosovo Albanian celebrities and singers such as Tayna, Kida, Rina, Dhurata Ahmetaj, Dafina Zeqiri, Genta Ismajli, Elvana Gjata, and Loredana Zefi. Swiss newspaper Blick wrote, "A blond is not a blonde if Ajkune didn't style her hair". She is the first and only Albanian hairdresser who has developed her signature hair coloring, hair extensions, lipstick and shampoo products. In 2020, she opened her third salon in collaboration with make-up artist Onik.

== Personal life ==
Ajkune Ahmetaj is married and has three children.
