= School's Out (2018 film) =

2018 French social drama film

- Film poster
- French: L'Heure de la sortie
- Directed by: Sébastien Marnier
- Screenplay by: Sébastien Marnier and Elise Griffon
- Based on: L'Heure de la sortie by Christophe Dufossé
- Produced by: Caroline Bonmarchand
- Starring: Laurent Lafitte; Emmanuelle Bercot; Luàna Bajrami; Victor Bonnel
- Cinematography: Romain Carcanade
- Edited by: Isabelle Manquillet
- Music by: Zombie Zombie
- Production company: Avenue B Productions
- Release date: 31 August 2018 (Venice)
- Running time: 103 minutes
- Country: France

School's Out (French: L'heure de la sortie) is a 2018 French social drama thriller film directed by Sébastien Marnier who co-wrote the script with Elise Griffon, based on Christophe Dufossé's 2002 novel of the same name.

== Synopsis ==
Substitute French teacher, Pierre Hoffman, finds himself in charge of teaching an experimental class of twelve gifted students at the renowned Saint Joseph College. The class had witnessed their previous French teacher commit suicide by jumping out of the window, and Pierre is treated with hostility and distrust by the class. The class hall monitors, Apolline and Dimitri, are ringleaders of separate subgroups in the class, and Apolline soon pits herself against Hoffman. Hoffman begins following Apolline and her followers after class and witnesses them engaging in disturbing and violent rituals.

== Cast ==
- Laurent Lafitte as Pierre Hoffman
- Emmanuelle Bercot as Catherine
- Luàna Bajrami as Apolline
- Adèle Castillon as Clara
- Victor Bonnel as Dimitri

== Production ==
In 2017 it was announced that Sébastien Marnier, who had previously directed the 2016 thriller Faultless (Irréprochable), would helm the project and that Laurent Lafitte and Emmanuelle Bercot had joined the cast. Filming began on June 12, 2017, and a 2018 release date was announced.

== Reception ==
On Rotten Tomatoes the film has a 100% rating based on reviews from 16 critics. The film's cinematography, score, and acting were praised for heightening suspense, while the direction and story were criticized for falling flat in places. EJ Oakley of The Panoptic gave it 4 out of 5 stars, and praised the performances of Lafitte and Bajrami, while noting that the film did not satisfactorily tie up all of its loose ends and subplots.
