= Olta Ahmetaj =

Albanian choreographer (born; 1987)

- Born: February 23, 1987 (age 39); Tirana, Albania
- Occupation: Dancer /Choreographer
- Years active: 1994 - Present
- Partner: Fabian Basha
- Children: 2

Olta Ahmetaj (born 23 February 1987) is an Albanian choreographer and dancer born in Tirana. She started her dancing career in her childhood. She is also the founder of Olta Dance Studio.

== Early life ==
Ahmetaj was born into an Albanian family in Tirana on 23 February 1987. She started dancing for the first time in few courses in 1994, which gave her access to stage presentations in the years to come. Later on, she studied at the National Ballet school in Tirana and graduated as a dancer in 2006.

She continued to dance on stage while completing her studies at University of Arts.

From here she continued dancing and creating choreographies for various TV shows, concerts and videoclips. In 2011 she opened her Olta Dance Studio, which is still active.

== Personal life ==
Ahmetaj is the mother of twin boys, born in 2013.

According to Ahmetaj, the decision to have a child before marriage was motivated by her desire to start a family, and it was not initially intended as a permanent arrangement. Over time, this decision evolved into what they describe as a matter of negligence.

== Career ==
Ahmetaj started working on TV since her high school years and was part of the TvKlan dance crew.

She also started to work as a choreographer for Miss globe international.

She has participated in the show "Miss Albania" as a choreographer since 2010.

Ahmetaj become a part of the "Dancing with the stars" as a dancer and choreographer since the first edition in 2010, but did not take part in the 4th edition.

She has completed a course in contemporary dance, allowing her to create and dance professionally.

In 2011, Ahmetaj appeared in Albanian Clip Nights.

She has also been collaborating and participating as a choreographer in Netet e Clipit Shqipetare for years but in the 2024 she was not among the judges of this Gala. In May 2024, she also appeared in a TV show named "Live from Tirana" as a guest.

She went on to collaborate with numerous artists and singers for music videos or in festival appearances, performing both as a dancer and as a choreographer.
