= Serhii Filimonov =

Ukrainian activist (born 1994)

- Сергій Філімонов
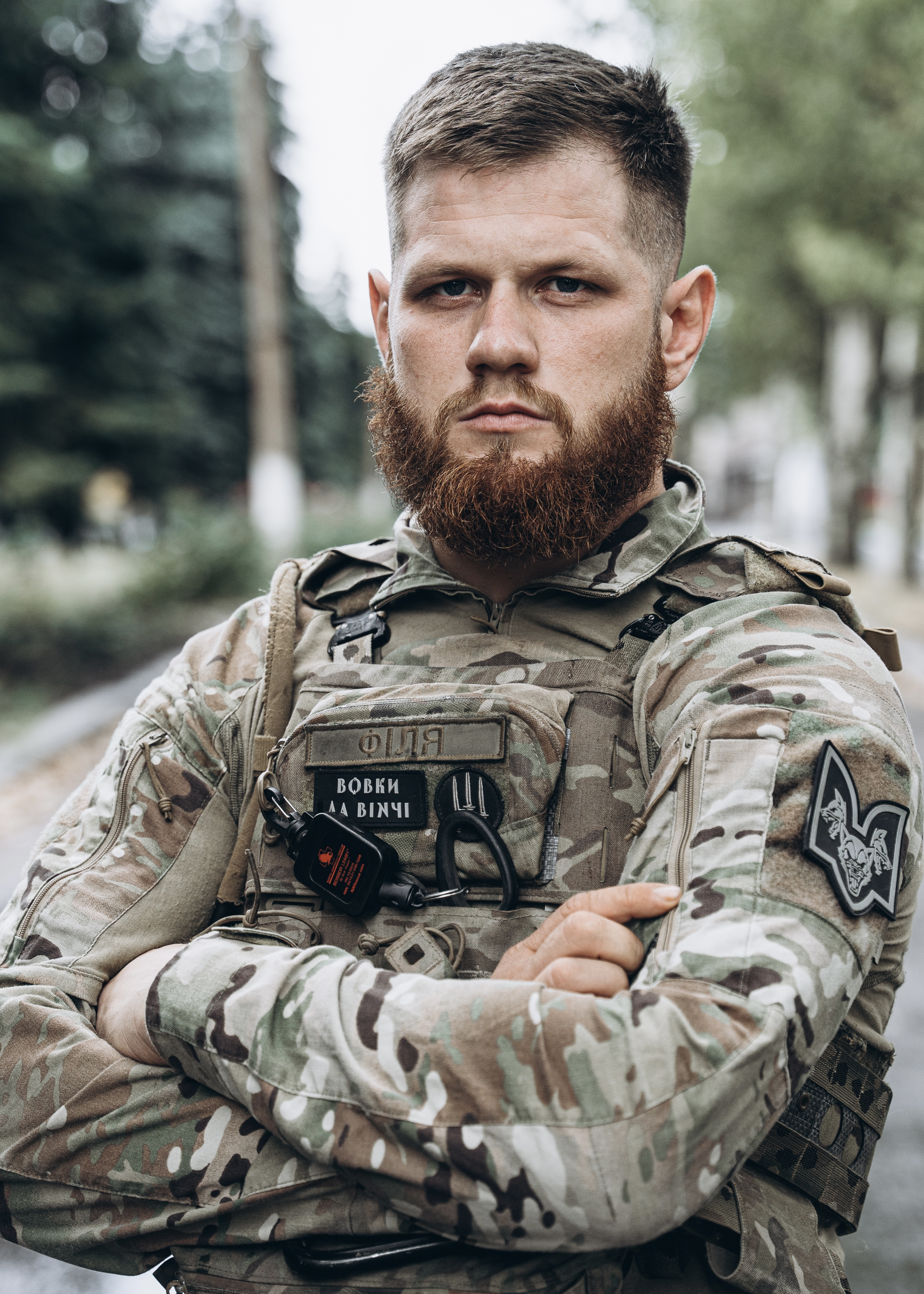
- Born: 20 September 1994 (age 32); Kyiv, Ukraine

Serhii Fedorovych Filimonov (Ukrainian: Сергій Федорович Філімонов; born July 3) is a Ukrainian public figure, a veteran of the Russo-Ukrainian War, leader of the Honor movement, former leader of the Kyiv branch of the Azov Civil Corps and the Kyiv branch of the far-right National Corps party, organizer and participant of activist initiatives against urban construction, in support of political prisoners and victims of political crimes. He played the lead role in the film Rhino by Ukrainian director Oleg Sentsov. He has been described as a far right influencer, he was a strong advocate of Ukrainian sovereignty during the leadup to the invasion, and he put his acting career on hold to fight against the 2022 Russian invasion of Ukraine.

== Biography ==
Serhiy was born on September 20, 1994, in Kyiv, into a large family. He grew up in the Poznyaky neighbourhood of the Darnytsia district. Since 2010 he has been an active member of the football fan movement. One of the leaders of the fan group "Rodychi" (Relatives), which supports the football club "Dynamo" Kyiv.

Filimonov graduated from the Kyiv Specialized School with in-depth study of the Ukrainian language No. 316 in 2012. From 8th to 10th grade he studied at the Republican Higher School of Physical Culture (Ivan Piddubny Olympic College), where he was professionally engaged in freestyle wrestling.

In 2018 he graduated from the Kyiv National University of Civil Engineering and Architecture with a degree in civil engineering. From the second year he moved to distance learning due to participation in the Revolution of Dignity.

In 2021, he enrolled at the Ukrainian Catholic University to study public administration, but did not complete the programme due to the 2022 Russian invasion of Ukraine.

== The war in eastern Ukraine ==
Filimonov took part in hostilities as a volunteer in the Azov Volunteer Battalion from the first days of the Russian-Ukrainian war in 2014.

Filimonov took part in the liberation of Mariupol, Marinka, in the Ilovaisk, in the battles near Granitne and received numerous combat wounds near Ilovaisk.

== Public activity ==
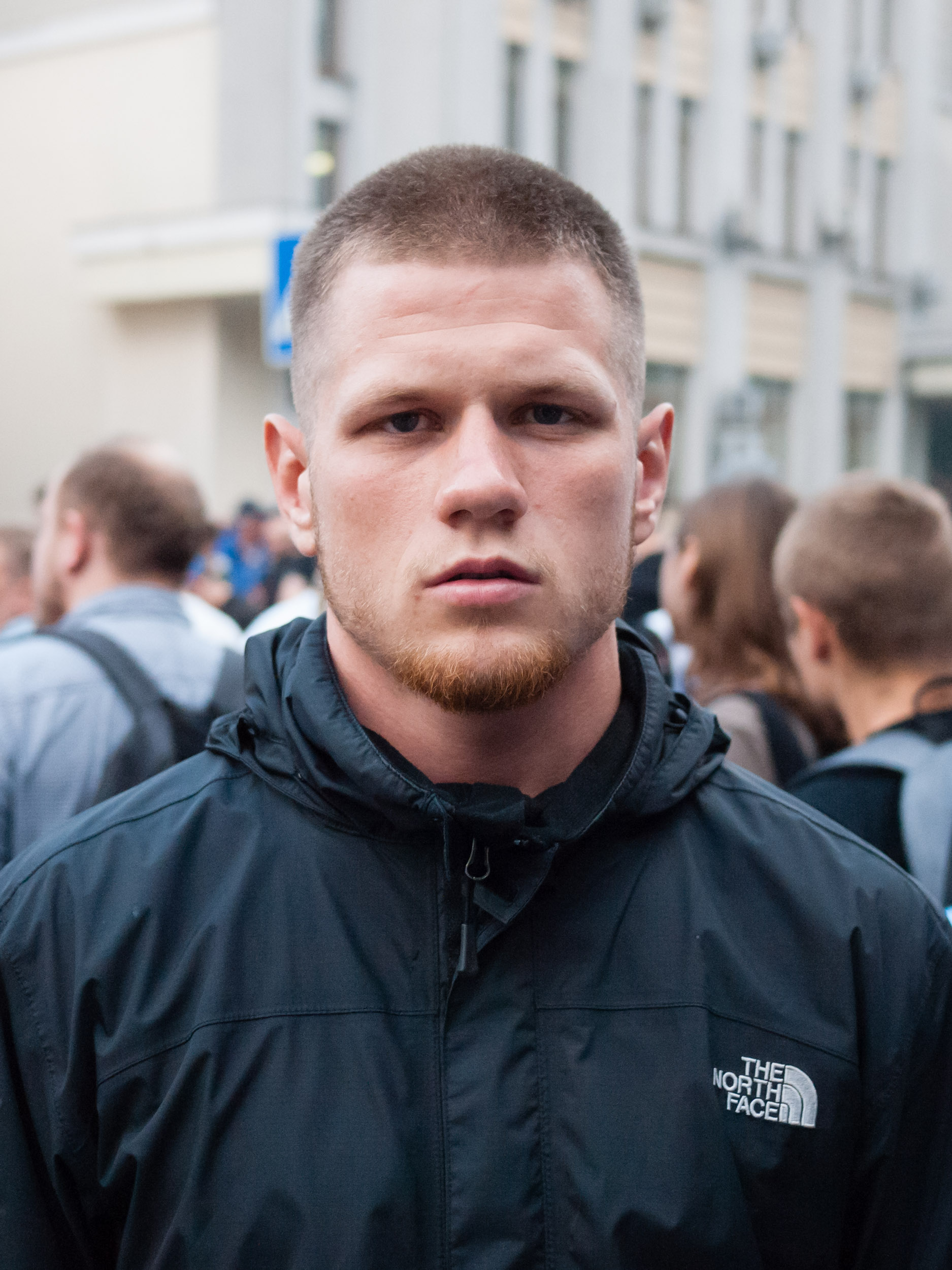
Filimonov in 2019

After returning from the front in 2015, he became one of the organizers of the peaceful public action "Blockade of Crimea".

In 2015 – Chairman of the NGO "Civil Corps of Azov" in Kyiv.

In 2015 – one of the founders of the informal youth movement "Honor".

In 2016, he was the head of the Kyiv branch of the National Corps political party.

From 2015 to 2017, he launched a number of public projects, including: "Zooprotection", aimed to combat animal cruelty, support shelters and fight against dog hunters; "One Blood" – a project to collect donated blood for children and wounded soldiers; "Our Future" - helping children left without parental care, a number of sports and educational initiatives.

Filimonov organized "Lessons of Courage": special lectures for students on patriotism and military training.

In 2018, Filimonov took part in the detention of Rafael Lusvarghi, a Brazilian LPR / DPR mercenary.

On January 29, 2018, he participated in the opening of the monument to the Heroes of Kruty in Kyiv.

In the spring of 2019, he resigned as head of the Kyiv branch of the National Corps political party, publicly accusing the party of operating an undisclosed cash fund and claiming he had been directed to channel money into official party accounts through proxy individuals.

He took an uncompromising position on illegal construction in Kyiv. He was the organizer of numerous direct actions and information campaigns against the construction of Narbut Square, Protasov Gorge, Hay Market, Sviatoshynsky Lane, Oskorka Eco-Park, Krister Hill, Chornobylska Street, against the construction on Andriyivskyy Descent, participated in the struggle for the museum on Post Square. On January 14, 2022, unknown people spray-painted Filimonov's house and car and threw a pig's head in the yard. Sergei blamed the owner of the construction company StolitsaGrup Vladislav Molchanov. According to Sergei, developers offered him for the waiver of shares from 50 thousand to 1 million dollars.

In November–December 2019, he and his comrades took part in the protests in Hong Kong.

He was an active participant of the initiative "Who put the contract on Katya Handziuk?" – a public initiative created by friends of an activist Kateryna Handziuk a few days after the attack on her. Activists were attending court hearings on the case and were following the steps of the investigation in order to punish all those involved in Katya's murder.

On February 24, 2021, together with his colleagues from the Honor Kyiv organization, he broke into the meeting room of the Kramatorsk City Council during a session and clashed with representatives of the Shariy Party fraction in the City Council when they came with posters in support of Anatoly Shariy.

In March 2021, he organized the action "Can't you hear? You will see" in support of Serhii Sternenko, a public figure whose illegal imprisonment has sparked a wave of protests and peaceful actions across the country.

In 2021, by a joint decision of the Ukrainian School of Political Studies (USPS) and Viktor Handziuk, after consultations with civil society representatives, Serhii Filimonov received a scholarship for a civic position named after Kateryna Handziuk: "Annual Kateryna Handziuk scholarship for civic position" was founded by USPS in 2019, Katya was a graduate of the School in 2015.

== The 2022 Russian invasion ==
From the first days of the full-scale Russian invasion, Filimonov formed a unit whose core consisted of members and supporters of the "Honor" movement. The unit participated in the defense of Kyiv and the Kyiv region.

In April 2022, the "Honor" unit merged with the 1st assault company of Dmytro Kotsyubaylo's DUK PS, forming the 108th Separate Assault Battalion "Da Vinci Wolves", which joined the 7th Centre of the Special Operations Forces of Ukraine. The battalion was commanded by Kotsyubaylo, and Filimonov was appointed commander of the 2nd company, which took the name "Honor".

On July 5, 2022, he was wounded by Russian BM-21 Grad rocket artillery fire.

As a soldier and company commander, he took part in the liberation of the Kharkiv region (Kupyansk, Balaklia, Izium), and in battles for Bakhmut, Soledar, Khromove, Chasiv Yar, Serbryanka and Berestove, as well as in the defense of Kupyansk and Klishchiivka.

In autumn 2023, he was appointed deputy commander of reconnaissance of the Da Vinci Wolves battalion.

On February 6, 2024, Filimonov was appointed commander of the 108th Separate Assault Battalion "Da Vinci Wolves" within the 59th Separate Motorized Infantry Brigade named after Yakiv Handziuk.

From June 2024, the battalion has been engaged in combat in the Pokrovsk direction, including operations around Krasnohorivka, Ukrainsk, Voznesenka and Novotroitske.

On July 12, 2024, SBU Director Vasyl Maliuk awarded Filimonov a named firearm.

In December 2024, Filimonov received an extraordinary promotion to the rank of captain of the Armed Forces of Ukraine.

In March 2025, it became publicly known that Nate Vance — a cousin of U.S. Vice President JD Vance — had served under Filimonov's command in the "Honor" company of the Da Vinci Wolves battalion since 2022. Together with Filimonov, Nate Vance took part in multiple assault operations in the Kharkiv and Donetsk regions. Filimonov described him as "an excellent fighter with a cold-blooded character," adding: "15 times we should have died — 15 times we were lucky to survive."

In September 2025, for exceptional services in defending state sovereignty and strengthening the defence capability of Ukraine, Filimonov was awarded the Order of Bohdan Khmelnytsky, 2nd class.

In November 2025, the French newspaper Le Monde published an interview with Filimonov, covering his nationalist activities since 2014, his combat experience, the Da Vinci Wolves, and his appointment as battalion commander following the death of Dmytro Kotsyubaylo. Filimonov stated: "Russia is a monster that knows no limits when it comes to human lives and has considerable financial power. It is impossible to defeat such a country without the full support of our allies." He also said: "We cannot destroy Russia, but we are killing its soldiers by the thousands for every village we capture. We are inflicting losses ten times greater than our own. We are not losing the war. We are fighting."

On December 5, 2025, by Order No. 310 of the commander of the Drone Forces of the Armed Forces of Ukraine, Filimonov was promoted to the rank of major.

== Criminal prosecution ==
During the Revolution of Dignity in 2014, Filimonov was subjected to persecution by the Yanukovych-era authorities and appeared on so-called "death lists" — lists of Maidan activists whom the regime planned to physically eliminate using police and criminal elements.

He has been a defendant in several court cases related to his campaigns against illegal construction projects.

On September 10, 2016, he was arrested after a clash with police officers near the offices of Kyivmiskbud during a protest against construction in Sviatoshynsky Lane. He was taken into custody but was subsequently released on bail secured by Members of Parliament Andriy Biletsky and Oleh Petrenko.

In May 2018, he received a new charge for organising a confrontation with hired provocateurs (titushky) at the Osokorky Ecopark construction site. The developer "Arkada" and contractor "Contractbudservice" were attempting to begin construction of 43 buildings of 25–27 storeys on the site of Lake Nebrezh, which local residents considered illegal. On May 30, 2018, a court imposed a night-time house arrest on Filimonov, which lasted until September 29, 2018.

On March 23, 2021, he was served a suspicion notice under Article 296 of the Criminal Code of Ukraine in connection with clashes near the Office of the President of Ukraine on March 20, 2021.

== Rhino ==
Filimonov played the lead role in the film Rhino by Ukrainian director Oleh Sentsov. Rhino is the second feature film by the Ukrainian director Oleh Sentsov. In 2012, the film was already presented at the industry platform of the Sofia International Film Festival, where it received awards for Best Project and Best Pitching. However, work on the film was suspended due to Sentsov's illegal arrest by Russian security services in 2014 and his subsequent imprisonment. Work on the project was resumed after the release of the director in 2019. The world premiere of Rhino is scheduled take place on September 10, 2021, at the 78th Venice Film Festival in the Orizzonti section.

Filming of Rhino took place in Kryvyi Rih, Lviv and Kyiv and wrapped in December 2020. The film is a co-production of Ukraine, Poland and Germany.

At the Stockholm International Film Festival 2021 Filimonov won the best actor category and Rhino best film.

== Assassination attempt ==
On July 29, 2025, the Security Service of Ukraine (SBU) announced the arrest of a person who had been preparing the assassination of Filimonov under the direction of Russia's Federal Security Service (FSB).

The FSB recruiter posed as an SBU officer, leading the suspect to believe he was assisting Ukrainian intelligence in neutralising a Russian agent. The suspect — a resident of Kamianske and a former ATO participant — was directed to send the handler photographs of Filimonov's surroundings, descriptions of his movements, and to track his vehicle. The handler then passed the suspect the coordinates of a concealed firearm and ordered him to kill Filimonov. The SBU detained the suspect immediately before the murder attempt.
