= Adèle Castillon =

French singer and actress (born 2001)

- Castillon in 2026

Background information
- Born: Adèle Castillon du Perron; 24 October 2001 (age 25); Angers, Maine-et-Loire, France
- Origin: Nantes, France
- Genres: Electropop; synthpop
- Occupation: Singer
- Years active: 2017–present
- Labels: Columbia Records; Iconoclast Music; Petit Lion Productions; Sony Music
- Formerly of: Videoclub
- Partner: Matthieu Reynaud (2018-2021)
- Website: adelecastillon.com

Adèle Castillon du Perron (French pronunciation: [adɛl kastijɔ̃]; born 24 October 2001) is a French singer and actress. She was the singer in the French pop duo Videoclub from 2018 until 2021. After her first experience in cinema, she released the mixtape Crèvecoeur between the albums Plaisir Risque Dépendance and (Re)Belle.

== Life and career ==
=== Early life ===
Castillon was born in Angers, in Pays de la Loire, on 24 October 2001. She has two siblings. As a child, Castillon started making YouTube videos and had theatre training, though she did not consider that these two correlated with each other and did not intend to use YouTube for her career prospects. For the Dissemblances media, she made her first interview of the French actress Léa Seydoux. At the age of 15, with some friends, she interviewed the Dalai Lama in Dharamshala, India.

In 2017, she played Violette Hazan in the movie Sous le même toit directed by Dominique Farrugia.

In 2018, she played Clara in School's Out directed by Sébastien Marnier.

=== Group Videoclub ===
In 2018, Castillon met Matthieu Reynaud and formed Videoclub, over their shared love of 80s nostalgia. Their channel had amassed over 20,000 subscribers before posting anything, to the suspicion of YouTube. Due to Castillon's popularity on the site, their music quickly went viral there, as well as on TikTok and Spotify.

In 2019, in Milan, Adèle Castillon laid all her cards on the table to sing Amour plastique. The English singer Anna Calvi invited the group Videoclub to open her concert at Circolo Magnolia during Unaltrofestival. At the end of the slideshow, starting with Anna Calvi, the four cardinal points were inscribed on Adèle Castillon's petite robe noire (Little Black Dress): The Moon, The Sun, The Stars, and The Soul. These framed the Three of Swords tarot card, which depicts three swords piercing a heart symbolizing the experience of heartbreak.

Back in Nantes, Castillon approached film director Sirine Mamoun to film her at the location where Amour plastique was shot by director Julie Reynaud. (Note: Amour Plastique, directed by Rose Denoaptea, is a musical film starring Adèle Castillon and 9mattyeux, with music composed by Matthieu Reynaud and lyrics written by Esteban Capron.)

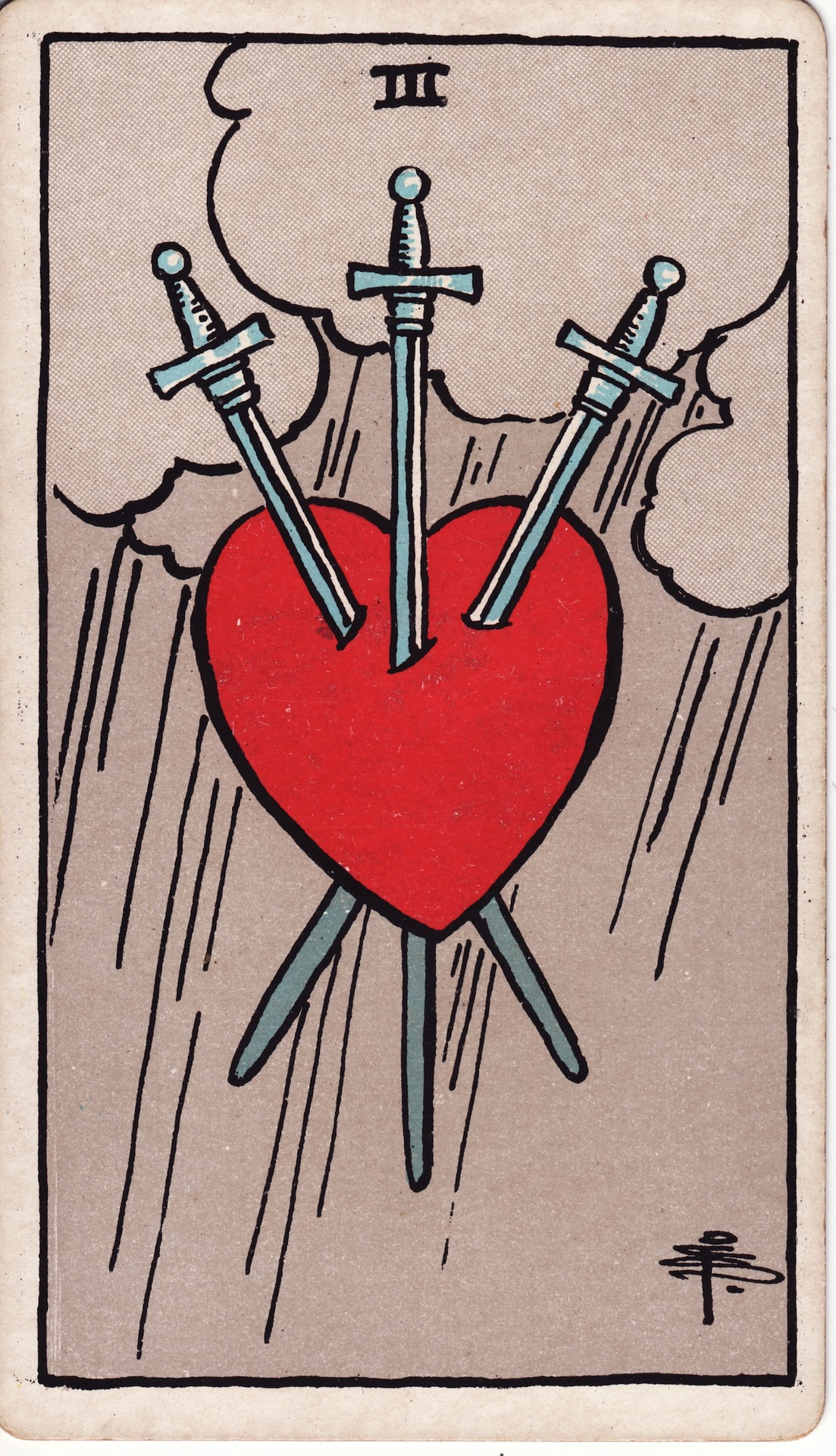
Crève-cœur Three of Swords

On 31 March 2021, the group was dissolved when Castillon and Reynaud ended their relationship. In May 2021, before the release of their album Euphories, Videoclub announced the disbandment of the group and that they would each be pursuing solo projects.

=== Solo career ===
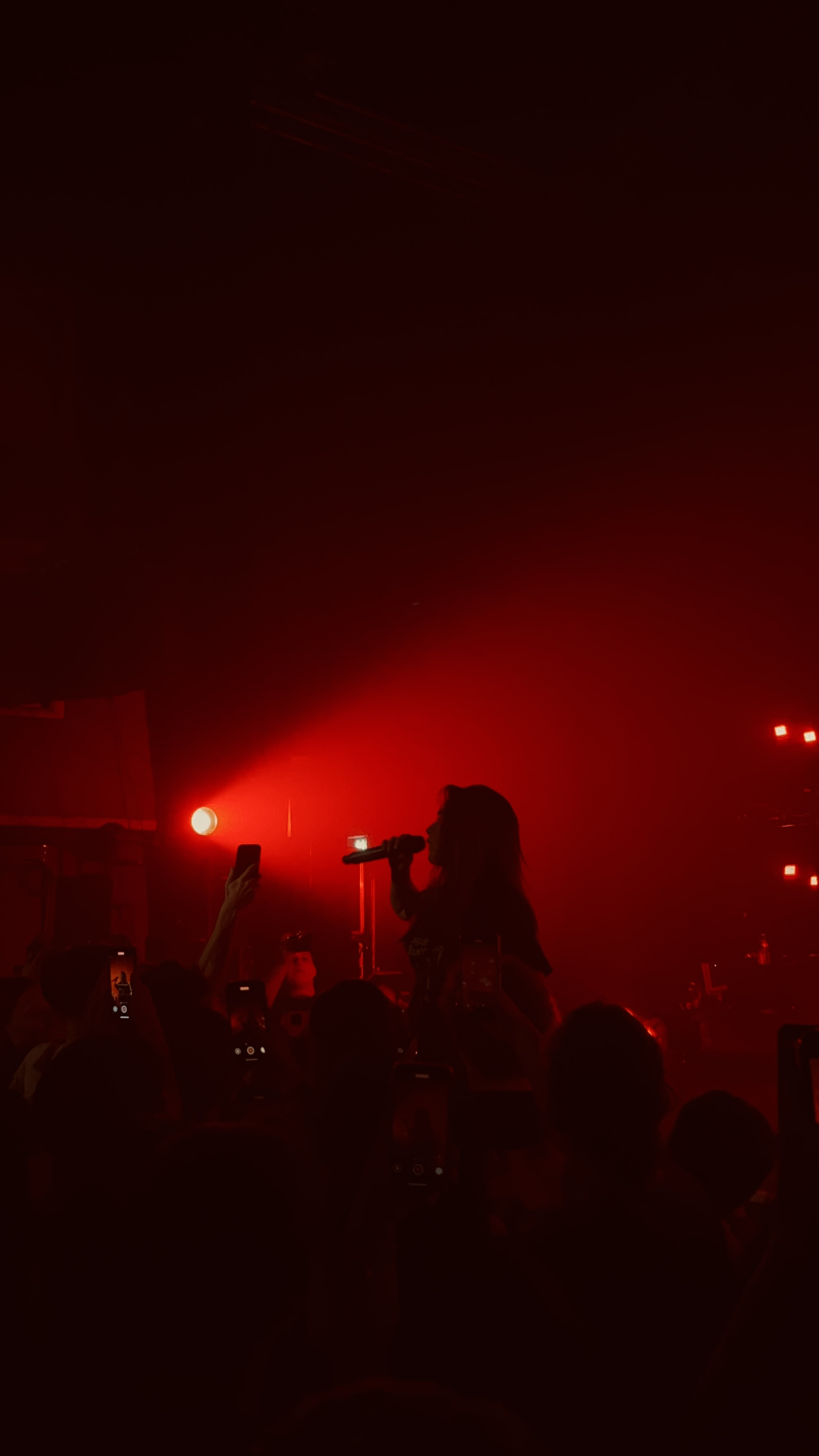
Adèle Castillon in Lille, 2025

On 10 June 2022, after splitting from Videoclub, she released her first song Impala. She is currently signed to Columbia Records.

On 7 April 2023, she released her second single called Rêve (Dream), followed by the single Alabama on 16 June 2023. Her first solo album followed on 20 October 2023, named PRD: Pleasure Risk Dependency.

On 31 May 2024, Castillon released Ce Soir, which features rapper Gazo.

On 24 July 2024, in Seine-Saint-Denis, Adèle Castillon served as a torchbearer, relaying the flame for the 2024 Summer Olympics. On the eve of the opening ceremony, she and Gazo invited the audience at Parc Georges Valbon to a free concert in La Courneuve.

In 2025, Castillon released her mixtape Crèvecoeur (Heartbreaking). In the summer of 2025, Adèle Castillon delivered her first performance at the biggest French festival: the Vieilles Charrues. She also figured as the opening act of the Cabaret Vert festival in that same year.

== Musical style and influences ==
Castillon's musical style draws inspiration from that of Billie Eilish.

== Discography ==
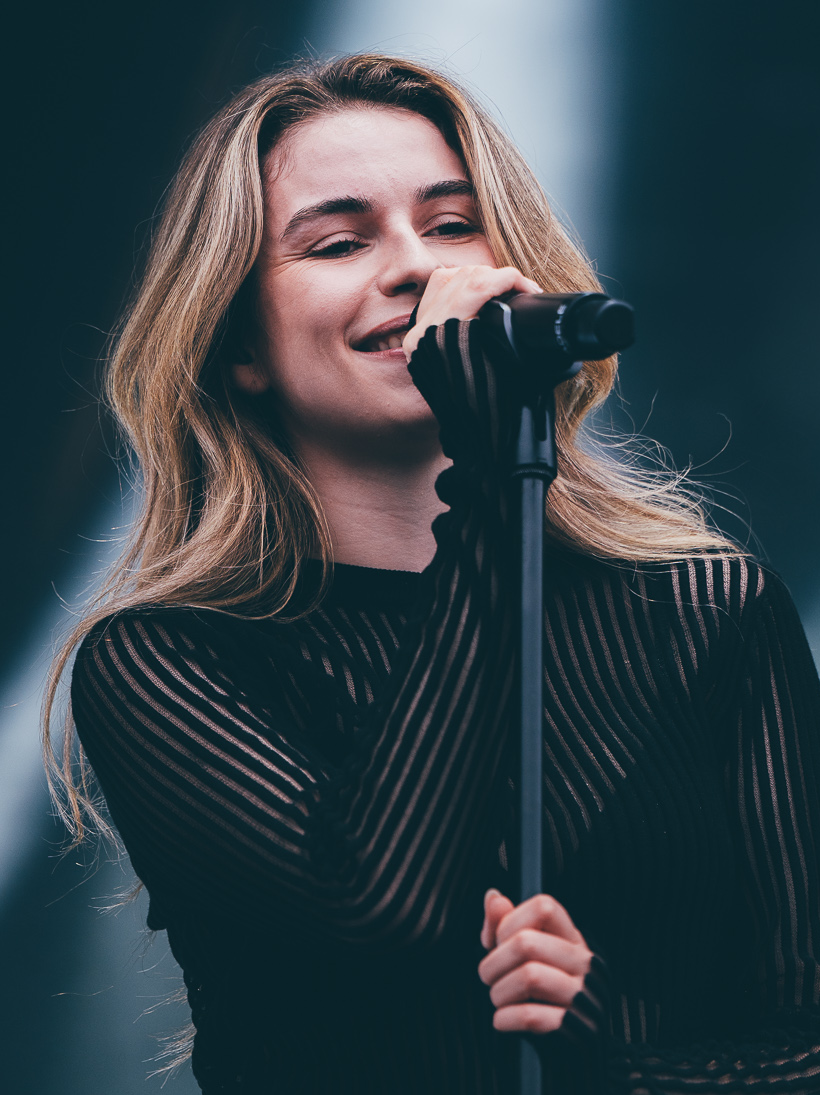
Castillon in 2025

Date	Album	Label	Peak
20/10/2023	Plaisir Risque Dépendance	Iconoclast Music, Sony Music France	58
04/11/2024	Crèvecoeur EP 1	Iconoclast Music, Sony Music France	
28/02/2025	Crèvecoeur EP 2	Iconoclast Music, Sony Music France	54

Year	Single	Peak	Album
2022	Impala		Plaisir Risque Dépendance
2023	Notice, Sensations, Gabrielle, Alabama, Rêve, C'est Drôle		Plaisir Risque Dépendance
2024	Ce Soir (featuring Gazo)	76	Crèvecoeur EP 1
2025	Je me demande (ft. Louane), Rien qu'ça, Oh non :(		Crèvecoeur EP 2
2026	Été avec toi	16	(Re)Belle

== Filmography ==
Films
Year	Title	Role	Director
2017	Sous le même toit	Violette Hazan	Dominique Farrugia
2018	School's Out	Clara	Sébastien Marnier

=== Music videos ===
Reference IMDb and her YouTube channel.

Year	Title	Director	Featuring	DOP
2022	Impala	Alice Moitié	Miléna Leblanc, Paul Mirabel	
2023	Rêve	Adèle Castillon	Célestine Forget, Claire Beuret, Clémence Villechavrolle, Lola Bée, Lola Daniel, Mira Gouled, Nina Blanc-Francard, Tina Rozen	André Chemetoff
2023	Alabama	Francesco Petroni	Aminata Diagne, Loup Lélass, Claude Payen de Lapierre, Alice Lemonnier, Nana Kadidia, Jean-Désiré Augnet, Dave Nsaman Okebwan	Hugo Carlier
2023	C'est Drôle	Sirine Mamoun	Piano by Antoine Berquet	
2023	Sensations	Antoine Chapus	Aminata Diagne, Loup Lélass, and the audience at Gaîté Lyrique, Paris on 26 October 2023	
2024	Gabrielle	Jack Lowe		Ben Coughlan
2024	Crèvecoeur	Josselin Facon	Adèle Crève-cœur. Laura Passalacqua as Art Director	
2024	À la folie	Adèle Castillon	Aminata Diagne as Art Director. Choreographer: Amel Khaies	Adrien Lallau
2024	Ce Soir	Mario Roudil	Gazo	
2026	Été avec toi	Ella Bedia and Aminata Diagne	Emma, Adèle, Fanta, Ella, Violette, Aminata, Lucie Beylot, Marie-Lilas	Antoine Chapus

=== Television ===
Date	TV	Program	Director	Productor
2022-09-13	Canal+	The Question Box	Bertrand Delaire	Purdey Chabrieres
2025-07-19	France Télévision	Vieilles Charrues Festival	Adeline Chahin	
2025-08-14	Arte	Cabaret Vert Festival	Sébastien Lefebvre	
2026-01-17	TF1	Star Academy season 13: Duet Amour plastique with Léa	Franck Broqua	

=== Radio ===
Date	Radio	Program	Author	Duration
2024-02-01	France Inter	Adèle Castillon. Album: PRD. The interview opens with a discussion about the origins of Notice, then later about the connection between Amour plastique and Napoleon.	Laurent Goumarre	21 min
2025-07-09	France Info	Adèle Castillon, artist of confession	Bertrand Dicale	7 min
2025-08-26	France Inter	Adèle Castillon: the former YouTuber who became a star of French pop	Mehdi Maïzi	56 min
2025-12-30	Skyrock	Adèle Castillon: In Loop, live	Mrik	13 min

== Awards and nominations ==
Year	Award	Category	Nominated work	Result
2017	melty Future Awards	Coming Soon		Won
2022	NRJ Music Award	Francophone Revelation of the Year	Impala	Nominated
2024	39th Victoires de la Musique	Best New Female Artist	C'est drôle	Nominated
2026	NRJ Music Award	Francophone Song of the Year	Été avec toi	Won

== Personal life ==
Castillon disclosed that the couple had already separated prior to the breakup of the group Videoclub.
She also described a difficult split, including her estrangement from the family of her ex-boyfriend and former partner.

She appreciates dinosaurs: on her arm, there is a tattoo in shape of dinosaur. She likes race cars, and has a keen interest in psychology.
