= The Hill Where Lionesses Roar =

2021 French-Kosovar film

- Albanian: Luaneshat e kodrës
- Directed by: Luàna Bajrami
- Written by: Luàna Bajrami
- Produced by: Luàna Bajrami; Adrien Ferrand; Pascal Judelewicz; Quentin Just; Val Rahmany
- Starring: Flaka Latifi; Urate Shabani; Era Balaj
- Cinematography: Hug Paturel
- Edited by: Michel Klochendler; Juliette Penant
- Music by: Aldo Shllaku
- Production companies: Orezane Films; Vents Contraires; Acajou Productions
- Distributed by: Le Pacte
- Release date: July 8, 2021 (Cannes)
- Running time: 83 minutes
- Countries: France; Kosovo
- Language: Albanian

The Hill Where Lionesses Roar (French: La colline où rugissent les lionnes; Albanian: Luaneshat e kodrës) is a drama film, directed by Luàna Bajrami and released in 2021. A coproduction of companies from France and Kosovo, the film centres on Qe (Flaka Latifi), Jeta (Urate Shabani) and Li (Era Balaj), three teenage girls in Kosovo who form a gang and engage in petty crime as they impatiently await their opportunity to go away to university and escape the boredom of their smalltown life.

An excerpt from the film was screened in the Work in Progress section of the Les Arcs Film Festival in 2019.

The film premiered in the Directors' Fortnight program at the 2021 Cannes Film Festival, where it was a nominee for the Queer Palm. It had its North American premiere at the 2021 Toronto International Film Festival.
