= Luàna Bajrami =

French actress

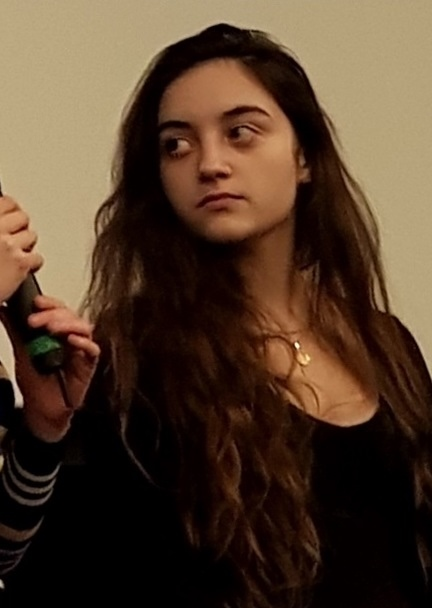
- Bajrami at the premiere of School's Out
- Born: 14 March 2001 (age 25); Pleshinë, Ferizaj, Kosovo
- Occupation: Actress
- Years active: 2011–present

Luàna Bajrami-Rahmani (French: [lwana baʒʁami]; born 14 March 2001) is a French-Albanian actress from Kosovo. She is known for her roles in the films Portrait of a Lady on Fire (2019) and School's Out (2018). She made her directorial debut with The Hill Where Lionesses Roar (2021).

== Early life ==
Bajrami's family is from Pleshinë, a village in the city of Ferizaj in Kosovo. When she was seven, the family moved to Créteil, just south of Paris. She first became interested in acting after watching Nicolas Bary's 2008 adaption of Trouble at Timpetill, based on the novel by Henry Winterfeld.

== Career ==
Bajrami's first role was in the 2011 television film Adèle's Choice by Olivier Guignard, where she played an 8-year-old Albanian student whose family was threatened with expulsion. This student finds support from her teacher, played by Miou-Miou. Bajrami had a small role in the 2014 short film 14 Million Screams by Lisa Azuelos. She played the title role in the TV film Marion by Bourlem Guerdjou. Marion was adapted from the eponymous book by Nora Fraisse retracing the Marion Fraisse affair in which a schoolgirl committed suicide following harassment by her fellow students, and first aired France 3 on 27 September 2016. In an interview with Le Monde, Bajrami reflected that this was the first role in which she felt creative control. She read the book and met with the mother of Marion Fraisse.

Bajrami starred in two more short films: Two Youths Died by Tomasso Usberti, which won third prize from the Cinéfondation at the Cannes Film Festival in 2017, and the 2018 film After the Night by Valentin Plisson and Maxime Roux.

She played the role of Apolline, the ringleader of a group of six intellectually gifted students facing off against their substitute teacher (played by Laurent Lafitte) in Sébastien Marnier's 2019 film School's Out, adapted from the eponymous novel by Christophe Dufossé. She was praised for her portrayal of Apolline, with EJ Oakley of The Panoptic stating that "Luana Bajrami is particularly menacing as the verbose and morose Apolline".

Bajrami was praised for her portrayal of Sophie in the 2019 independent French film Portrait of a Lady on Fire. That same year, she played the role of Emma in Cedric Khan's Happy Birthday, which focused on a dysfunctional family reunion.

In 2020, it was announced that Bajrami was making her directorial debut with the film The Hill Where Lionesses Roar. Bajrami was nominated for "Most Promising Actress" at the 2020 César Awards.

In 2024, Bajrami starred in Two People Exchanging Saliva, which tied with The Singers winning the Best Live Action Short Film award at the 98th Academy Awards.

== Filmography ==
=== Films ===
List of films featuring Bajrami
Year	Title	Role	Notes
2014	14 Million Screams	Louise	Short film
2017	Two Youths Died	Vera	Short film
2018	After the Night	Anastasia	
2018	School's Out	Apolline	
2019	Happy Birthday	Emma	
2019	Portrait of a Lady on Fire	Sophie	
2021	The Hill Where Lionesses Roar	Lena	Director, writer
2021	Happening	Hélène	
2022	Final Cut	Johanna	
2023	A Difficult Year (Une année difficile)	Antilope	
2024	Two People Exchanging Saliva	Malaise	Short film
2025	A Private Life	Valérie Cohen-Solal	

=== Television ===
List of television series featuring Bajrami
Year	Title	Role	Notes
2011	Vivement dimanche prochain	Herself	
2011	Adèle's Choice	Kaniousha	TV movie
2016	Marion, 13 Years Old Forever	Marion	TV movie
2018	War on Beasts	Nadia	
2019	Quotidien	Herself	
2019	Sous la peau	Léa Bourdouin	TV mini-series
2021	H24		Episode: "04H - Emprise"
