= Lorenc Antoni =

Albanian composer, conductor, and ethnomusicologist (1909–1991)

Lorenc Antoni (23 September 1909 – 21 October 1991) was an Albanian composer, conductor, and ethnomusicologist.

== Early years ==
Lorenc Antoni was born on 23 September 1909 in Üsküp (now Skopje), in the Kosovo Vilayet of the Ottoman Empire (present-day North Macedonia). Three years later, the region with which he would be associated for the rest of his life came to be first part of the Kingdom of Serbia and later Yugoslavia. He was raised as a Catholic in the Albanian Catholic community of Skopje, and is the cousin of Agnesë Gonxhe Bojaxhiu (Mother Teresa). Since childhood, he was active in various musical ensembles of the Albanians. He studied music privately in Skopje and Belgrade. After completing his education at the Faculty of Philosophy in Skopje, he relocated to Ferizaj.

== Career ==
In 1941 Antoni began teaching music in Ferizaj, Prizren, and Pristina. In 1948 Antoni established in Prizren one of the Josip Slavenski music schools of former Yugoslavia for beginners and intermediate music performers. He led and conducted the choir of the school. He also conducted the Symphony Orchestra of the city of Prizren.

In the study of folklore, Antoni wrote a seven-volume work on Albanian folk music from Kosovo, Macedonia, Montenegro and South Morava. He also composed around 200 musical compositions, mainly vocal pieces.

== Recognition ==
There is a music school named after Antoni in Prizren. The School of music “Lorenc Antoni” has six classes, 52 students, and 21 teachers.

== Death ==
Antoni died on 21 October 1991 in Pristina, SFR Yugoslavia.

== Works ==
=== Literary works ===
- "Songs popular Albanian Kosovo and Metohija", Prishtina 1953
- "Albanian folklore music", with seven volumes, 1956-1977 Pristina
- "Saga and Legend", Prishtina 1973
- "Old wives' tales." I, Pristina 1979
- "Research folklore", Pristina, 198
- "Old wives' tales", II, Pristina 1982
- "Songs Kreshnik" I, II, III
- "Lament, and elegji gjamë
- "Songs nuptial," I, II, etc..

=== Scientific articles ===
- "Albanian folklore music," to "New Life", 1949, no. 1
- "Format the pace of Albanian folk songs", to "New Life", 1949 (no. 1), 1950 (no. 5 and 6) 1951 (no. 1)
- "Foundations of tonal Albanian folk songs", the "Progress", 1952, no. 11-12
- "Songs from popular Opoja" to "Progress", 1959, no. 2-3
- "The Albanian kënduemit popular" to "Zvuk", 1960, no. 41-42
- "Two ways kënduemit the Albanians of Montenegro", in "Progress", 1961
- "Forms of music popular Albanian songs", to "Zvuk, 1963
- "Polifoni shape of the vocal folk music gegëve", "investigation Albanologjike, II/1972
- "Elements polyphonic music in the popular Opojës" Albanologjike investigation ", etc. II/1974.
