= Veli Sahiti =

Veli Sahiti is Albanian singer and composer from Kosovo. In 1973, he formed his group called Trix with Albanian rock and pop elements.

== Discography ==
- Krushqit e pajtimit, 1990
- Bukë, kripë e zemër, 1991
- Vala e re, 1992
- Toka ime, 1993
- Vallja e rinisë, 1994
- Si të them, 1995
- Çohu, more Rexho, 1996
- Fati nuk është iluzion, 1997
- Balada X, 1998
- Kurora digjet në zjarr, 1998
- Lamtumirë, gjeneratë, 2000
- Vallëzimi i yjeve, 2001
- Moj e mira te pojata, 2002
- Iluzion, 2003
- Engjulli im, 2005
- Imazhi yt, 2006
- Shëtitjet në Ulpianë, 2008.
