= 73rd Venice International Film Festival =

2016 Italian film festival

- Festival poster
- Opening film: La La Land
- Closing film: The Magnificent Seven
- Location: Venice, Italy
- Founded: 1932
- Awards: Golden Lion: The Woman Who Left
- Hosted by: Sonia Bergamasco
- Artistic director: Alberto Barbera
- Festival date: 31 August – 10 September, 2016
- Website: Website

Venice Film Festival chronology
- 74th 72nd

The 73rd annual Venice International Film Festival was held from 31 August to 10 September, 2016, at Venice Lido in Italy.

English filmmaker Sam Mendes was the jury president of the main competition. Italian actress Sonia Bergamasco hosted the opening and closing nights of the festival. The Golden Lion was awarded to The Woman Who Left by Lav Diaz.

A new project named Venice Production Bridge was introduced in this edition of the festival. The new project was intended to attract industry professionals and focus on original projects for films, internet, series, virtual reality, and works in progress, in order to help their development and production. It is also meant to work in conjunction with the Venice Film Market which started in 2012. Such projects as Final Cut in Venice, meant to help finance original films from African countries, and the Venice Gap-Financing Market will come under its scope.

The festival opened with La La Land by Damien Chazelle, and closed with The Magnificent Seven by Antoine Fuqua.

== Juries ==
=== Main competition (Venezia 73) ===
- Sam Mendes, British filmmaker and stage director - Jury President
- Laurie Anderson, American artist, composer, musician and film director
- Gemma Arterton, English actress
- Giancarlo De Cataldo, Italian novelist and screenwriter
- Nina Hoss, German actress
- Chiara Mastroianni, French-Italian actress
- Joshua Oppenheimer, American filmmaker
- Lorenzo Vigas, Venezuelan film director, screenwriter and producer
- Zhao Wei, Chinese actress, singer and film director

=== Orizzonti ===
- Robert Guédiguian, French filmmaker, producer and actor - Jury President
- Jim Hoberman, American film critic and academic
- Nelly Karim, Egyptian actress, fashion model and ballerina
- Valentina Lodovini, Italian film and TV actress
- Moon So-ri, South Korean actress, film director and screenwriter
- José María "Chema" Prado, director of the Filmoteca Española
- Chaitanya Tamhane, Indian filmmaker

=== Luigi De Laurentiis Award for a Debut Film ===
- Kim Rossi Stuart, Italian actor and director - Jury President
- Rosa Bosch, Spanish-born film producer
- Brady Corbet, American actor and filmmaker
- Pilar López de Ayala, Spanish film actress
- Serge Toubiana, Tunisian-born journalist and film critic

== Official Sections ==
=== In competition (Venezia 73) ===
The following films were selected for the main competition:

English title	Original title	Director(s)	Production country
Arrival		Denis Villeneuve	United States
The Bad Batch		Ana Lily Amirpour	United States
The Beautiful Days of Aranjuez	Les Beaux Jours d'Aranjuez	Wim Wenders	France, Germany
The Blind Christ	El Cristo ciego	Christopher Murray	Chile
Brimstone		Martin Koolhoven	Netherlands, France, Germany, Sweden, United Kingdom
The Distinguished Citizen	El ciudadano ilustre	Mariano Cohn and Gastón Duprat	Argentina, Spain
Frantz		François Ozon	France, Germany
Jackie		Pablo Larraín	United States, Chile, France, Italy
La La Land		Damien Chazelle	United States
The Light Between Oceans		Derek Cianfrance	United Kingdom, United States, India, Canada
Nocturnal Animals		Tom Ford	United States
On the Milky Road	Lungo la Via Lattea	Emir Kusturica	Bosnia and Herzegovina, Mexico, Serbia, United Kingdom, United States
Paradise	Рай	Andrei Konchalovsky	Russia
Piuma		Roan Johnson	Italy
These Days	Questi giorni	Giuseppe Piccioni	Italy
Spira Mirabilis		Massimo D'Anolfi and Martina Parenti	Italy
The Untamed	La Region Salvaje	Amat Escalante	Mexico, Denmark, France, Germany, Norway, Switzerland
Voyage of Time		Terrence Malick	United States
The Woman Who Left	Ang Babaeng Humayo	Lav Diaz	Philippines
A Woman's Life	Une Vie	Stéphane Brizé	France, Belgium

=== Out of Competition ===
The following films were selected to be screened out of competition

English title	Original title	Director(s)	Production country
The Age of Shadows	밀정	Kim Jee-woon	South Korea
Chuck	The Bleeder	Philippe Falardeau	United States
Gantz: O		Yasushi Kawamura	Japan
Hacksaw Ridge		Mel Gibson	United States, Australia
The Journey		Nick Hamm	United Kingdom
The Magnificent Seven		Antoine Fuqua	United States
Monte		Amir Naderi	Italy, United States, France
Never Ever	À jamais	Benoît Jacquot	France, Portugal
Planetarium		Rebecca Zlotowski	France, Belgium
Tommaso		Kim Rossi Stuart	Italy
The Young Pope (series)		Paolo Sorrentino	Italy, France, Spain, United Kingdom, United States
Non Fiction
American Anarchist		Charlie Siskel	United States
Assault to the Sky	Assalto al cielo	Francesco Munzi	Italy
Austerlitz		Sergei Loznitsa	Germany
I Called Him Morgan		Kasper Collin	Sweden, United States
One More Time With Feeling		Andrew Dominik	United Kingdom
Our War	La nostra guerra	Bruno Chiaravalloti, Claudio Jampaglia and Benedetta Argentieri	Italy, United States
Safari		Ulrich Seidl	Austria, Denmark

=== Orizzonti ===
The following films were selected for the Horizons (Orizzonti) section:

English title	Original title	Director(s)	Production country
In Competition
Big Big World	Koca Dünya	Reha Erdem	Turkey
Bitter Money	苦钱	Wang Bing	Hong Kong
Bluebeard	Kékszakállú	Gastón Solnicki	Argentina
Boys in the Trees		Nicholas Verso	Australia
Dark Night		Tim Sutton	United States
Dawson City: Frozen Time		Bill Morrison	France, United States
The Eremites	Die Einsiedler	Ronny Trocker	Austria, Germany
The Fury of a Patient Man	Tarde para la ira	Raúl Arévalo	Spain
The Greatest Dream	Il più grande sogno	Michele Vannucci	Italy
Gukoroku - Traces of Sin	Gukoroku	Kei Ishikawa	Japan
Heal the Living	Réparer les vivants	Katell Quillévéré	Belgium, France
Home		Fien Troch	Belgium
King of the Belgians		Peter Brosens and Jessica Woodworth	Belgium, Bulgaria, Netherlands
Libera Nos	Liberami	Federica Di Giacomo	Italy, France
Malaria	مالاریا	Parviz Shahbazi	Iran
Saint George	São Jorge	Marco Martins	France, Portugal
Shambles	Maudite poutine	Karl Lemieux	Canada
The Wedding Plan	לעבור את הקיר	Rama Burshtein	Israel
White Sun	सेतो सुर्य	Deepak Rauniyar	Nepal, Netherlands, Qatar, United States
Short films
500,000 Years	500,000 Pee	Chai Siris	Thailand
Amalimbo		Juan Pablo Libossart	Sweden, Estonia
Ce qui nous éloigne		Wei Hu	France
Colombi		Luca Ferri	Italy
Dadyaa		Bibhusan Basnet and Pooja Gurung	Nepal, France
First Night	Prima Noapte	Andrei Tanase	Romania, Germany
Good Luck, Orlo!	Srecno, Orlo!	Sara Kern	Slovenia, Croatia, Austria
Good News		Giovanni Fumu	South Korea, Italy
Midwinter		Jake Mahaffy	United States, New Zealand
Molly Bloom		Chiara Caselli	Italy
On the Origin of Fear		Bayu Prihantoro Filemon	Indonesia
Le reste est l’oeuvre de l’homme		Doria Achour	France, Tunisia
Ruah		Flurin Giger	Switzerland
Samedi Cinema		Mamadou Dia	Senegal
Stanza 52		Maurizio Braucci	Italy
La voz perdida		Marcelo Martinessi	Paraguay, Venezuela, Cuba

=== Venice Classics ===
The following films were selected to be screened in the Venice Classics section:

English title	Original title	Director(s)	Production country
Restored classic films
1848 (1948)		Dino Risi	Italy
An American Werewolf In London (1981)		John Landis	United Kingdom
L'Argent (aka Money) (1983)	L'argent	Robert Bresson	France, Switzerland
The Battle of Algiers (1966)	La battaglia di Algeri	Gillo Pontecorvo	Italy, Algeria
The Brat (1931)		John Ford	United States
Break Up (1965)	L'uomo dei cinque palloni	Marco Ferreri	Italy, France
The City Stands Trial (1952)	Processo alla città	Luigi Zampa	Italy
Dark Eyes (1987)	Oci ciornie	Nikita Mikhalkov	Italy, Soviet Union
Dawn of the Dead (1978)		George A. Romero	United States, Italy
Everybody Go Home (1960)	Tutti a casa	Luigi Comencini	Italy, France
The Great Sacrifice (1943)	Opfergang	Veit Harlan	Germany
Legend of the Mountain (1979)	山中傳奇	King Hu	Taiwan, Hong Kong
Manhattan (1979)		Woody Allen	United States
Nights of Zayandeh Rood (1990) (Opening film)	شبهای زاینده رود	Mohsen Makhmalbaf	Iran
The Ondekoza (1981)	ざ・鬼太鼓座	Tai Kato	Japan
Pretty Poison (1968)		Noel Black	United States
Scent of a Woman (1974)	Profumo di donna	Dino Risi	Italy
Seven Samurai (1954)	七人の侍	Akira Kurosawa	Japan
Stalker (1979)	Сталкер	Andrei Tarkovsky	Soviet Union
The Thief of Paris (1967)	Le Voleur	Louis Malle	France, Italy
Twentieth Century (1934)		Howard Hawks	United States
Documentaries on cinema
Acqua e zucchero. Carlo Di Palma, i colori della vita		Fariborz Kamkari	Italy
Along for the Ride		Nick Ebeling	United States
Bozzetto non troppo		Marco Bonfanti	Italy
Cinema Futures		Michael Palm	Austria
The Competition	Le Concours	Claire Simon	France
David Lynch: The Art Life		Jon Nguyen, Olivia Neergaard-Holm and Rick Barnes	United States, Denmark
E venne l’uomo – Un dialogo con Ermanno Olmi		Alessandro Bignami	Italy
Events in a Cloud Chamber		Ashim Ahluwalia	India
Perché sono un genio! Lorenza Mazzetti		Stefano Della Casa and Francesco Frisari	Italy
Viaggio nel cinema in 3D. Una storia Vintage		Jesus Garcès Lambert	Italy

=== Biennale College - Cinema ===
The following films were selected for the Biennale College - Cinema section.

English Title	Original Title	Director(s)	Production Country
Ears	Orecchie	Alessandro Aronadio	Italy
Hotel Salvation	Mukti Bhawan	Shubhashish Bhutiani	India
La Soledad		Jorge Thielen Armand	Venezuela
One Sister	Una Hermana	Sofia Brockenshire and Verena Kuri	Argentina

=== Final Cut in Venice ===
The following films were screened for the "Final Cut in Venice" section, a workshop to support the post-production of films from Africa:

Original Title	Director(s)	Production country
Félicité	Alain Gomis	France, Senegal, Belgium
Ghost Hunting	Raed Andoni	Palestine, France, Switzerland
Obscure	Soudade Kaadan	Syria, Lebanon
One of These Days	Nadim Tabet	Lebanon
Poisonous Roses	Fawzi Saleh	Egypt, France, Qatar
The Wound	John Trengove	South Africa, Germany, Netherlands, France

=== Il Cinema nel Giardino ===
The following feature films were selected for the Il Cinema nel Giardino section:

English title	Original title	Director(s)	Production country
Franca: Chaos and Creation		Francesco Carrozzini	Italy, United States
In Dubious Battle		James Franco	United States
Inseparables		Marcos Carnevale	Argentina
My Art		Laurie Simmons	United States
The Net	그물	Kim Ki-Duk	South Korea
Robinù		Michele Santoro	Italy
The Secret Life of Pets		Chris Renaud and Yarrow Cheney	United States
Summertime	L'estate addosso	Gabriele Muccino	Italy

=== Special screenings ===
The following film was presented as a Special Screening of the Official Selection:

- Spes contra Spem: Liberi Dentro (documentary) by Ambrogio Crespi

== Independent Sections ==
=== International Critics' Week ===
The following films were selected for the International Critics' Week section:

English title	Original title	Director(s)	Production country
In competition
Days of France	Jours de France	Jérôme Reybaud	France
Drum	طبل	Keywan Karimi	France, Iran
The Last of Us	Akher Wahed Fina	Ala Eddine Slim	Lebanon, Qatar, Tunisia, United Arab Emirates
The Last Things	Le Ultime Cose	Irene Dionisio	France, Italy, Switzerland
The Nobodies	Los Nadie	Juan Sebastián Mesa	Colombia
Prank		Vincent Biron	Canada
Singing in the Graveyards	Singing sa mga Dakong Libingan	Bradley Liew	Malaysia, Philippines
Special Events - Out of competition
Prevenge (Opening film)		Alice Lowe	United Kingdom
Are We Not Cats (Closing film)		Xander Robin	United States

=== Venice Days ===
The following films were selected for the 13th edition of the Venice Days (Giornate degli Autori) section:

English title	Original title	Director(s)	Production country
In Competition
Guilty Men	Pariente	Ivan D. Gaona	Colombia
Heartstone	Hjartasteinn	Guðmundur Arnar Guðmundsson	Iceland
Hounds of Love		Ben Young	Australia
Indivisible	Indivisibili	Edoardo De Angelis	Italy
Ordinary People	Pamilya Ordinaryo	Eduardo Roy Jr.	Philippines
Polina	Polina, danser sa vie	Angelin Preljocaj and Valérie Müller	France
Quit Staring at My Plate	Ne gledaj mi u pijat	Hana Jušić	Croatia, Denmark
The Road to Mandalay	再見瓦城	Midi Z	Taiwan, Myanmar, France, Germany
Sami Blood	Sameblod	Amanda Kernell	Sweden
The War Show		Andreas Dalsgaard and Obadiah Zytoon	Syria
The War Within	Ombre dal fondo	Paola Piacenza	Italy
Worldly Girl	La ragazza del mondo	Marco Danieli	Italy
Special Events
Always Shine		Sophia Takal	United States
Coffee	Caffè	Cristiano Bortone	Belgium, China, Italy
Il profumo del tempo delle favole		Mauro Caputo	Italy
Rocco		Thierry Demaizière and Alban Teurlai	France
L'uomo che non cambiò la storia		Enrico Caria	Italy
Vangelo		Pippo Delbono	Italy, Belgium, Switzerland
You Never Had It. An Evening with Bukowski		Matteo Borgardt	United States, Italy, Mexico
Miu Miu Women's Tales
Seed		Naomi Kawase	Japan
That One Day		Crystal Moselle	United States
Lux Award
As I Open My Eyes	À peine j'ouvre les yeux	Leyla Bouzid	Tunisia, France, Belgium, United Arab Emirates, Switzerland
My Life as a Courgette	Ma vie de Courgette	Claude Barras	Switzerland, France
Toni Erdmann		Maren Ade	Germany, Austria, Monaco, Romania, France

== Official Awards ==
=== In Competition (Venezia 73) ===
- Golden Lion: The Woman Who Left by Lav Diaz
- Grand Jury Prize: Nocturnal Animals by Tom Ford
- Silver Lion for Best Director:
  - Amat Escalante for The Untamed
  - Andrei Konchalovsky for Paradise
- Volpi Cup for Best Actress: Emma Stone for La La Land
- Volpi Cup for Best Actor: Oscar Martínez for The Distinguished Citizen
- Best Screenplay: Noah Oppenheim for Jackie
- Special Jury Prize: The Bad Batch by Ana Lily Amirpour
- Marcello Mastroianni Award: Paula Beer for Frantz

=== Golden Lion for Lifetime Achievement ===
- Jean-Paul Belmondo
- Jerzy Skolimowski

=== Orizzonti ===
- Best Film: Libera Nos by Federica Di Giacomo
- Best Director: Home by Fien Troch
- Special Jury Prize: Big Big World by Reha Erdem
- Best Actress: Ruth Díaz for The Fury of a Patient Man
- Best Actor: Nuno Lopes for Saint George
- Best Screenplay: Bitter Money by Wang Bing
- Horizons Prize for Best Short: La Voz Perdida by Marcelo Martinessi

=== Venice Classics Awards ===
- Best Documentary on Cinema: The Graduation by Claire Simon
- Best Restored Film: Break Up by Marco Ferreri

=== Luigi De Laurentiis Award for a Debut Film (Lion of the Future) ===
- The Last of Us by Ala Eddine Slim

=== Special awards ===
- Jaeger-LeCoultre Glory to the Filmmaker Award: Amir Naderi
- Persol Tribute To Visionary Talent Award: Liev Schreiber

== Independent Sections Awards ==
The following official and collateral awards were conferred to films of the autonomous sections:

=== Venice International Critics' Week ===
- Audience Award - Circolo del Cinema di Verona: The Nobodies by Juan Sebastián Mesa
- SIAE Award: Paolo Sorrentino
- Mario Serandrei - Hotel Saturnia Award: The Last of Us by Ala Eddine Slim

=== Venice Days ===
- Venice Days Award: The War Show by Andreas Dalsgaard and Obaidah Zytoon
- BNL Award: Pamilya ordinaryo by Eduardo Roy Jr.
- Brian Award: Worldly Girl by Marco Danieli
- Fedeora Awards:
  - Best Film: The Road to Mandalay by Midi Z
  - Best Young Director: Amanda Kernell for Sami Blood
  - Best Actress: Ashleigh Cummings for Hounds Of Love
  - Best European Film: Quit Staring at My Plate (Ne gledaj mi u pijat) by Hana Jušić
- Gianni Astrei Award: Indivisible by Edoardo De Angelis
- Europa Cinemas Label Award: Sami Blood by Amanda Kernell
- Lizzani Award: Worldly Girl by Marco Danieli
- Lina Mangiacapre Award: Indivisible by Edoardo De Angelis
- MigrArti Award: No Borders by Haider Rashid

== Independent Awards ==
The following collateral awards were conferred to films of the official selection:

=== Open Award ===
- Open Prize: Vangelo by Pippo Delbono

=== Francesco Pasinetti – SNGCI Award ===
- Best Film: Indivisible by Edoardo De Angelis
- Best Actor: Michele Riondino for Worldly Girl
- Best Actress: Sara Serraiocco for Worldly Girl
  - Special mention: Angela and Marianna Fontana for their roles in Indivisible

=== Queer Lion ===
- Heartstone by Guðmundur Arnar Guðmundsson

=== Arca CinemaGiovani Award ===
- Best Film (Main competition): Arrival by Denis Villeneuve
- Best Italian Film (Biennale College - Cinema): Ears by Alessandro Aronadio
- Civitas Vitae Award: Piuma by Roan Johnson

=== FEDIC Award ===
- Indivisible by Edoardo De Angelis
  - Special mentions:
    - The Greatest Dream by Michele Vannucci
    - Ears by Alessandro Aronadio

=== FIPRESCI Awards ===
- Best Film (Main competition): A Woman's Life by Stéphane Brizé
- Best Film (Horizons): Kékszakállú by Gastón Solnicki

=== Fondazione Mimmo Rotella Award ===
- James Franco (director) and Ambi Pictures (production) for In Dubious Battle
- Paolo Sorrentino and Jude Law for the series The Young Pope (Out of competition)
- Roan Johnson (director) and Lucky Red (distributor) for the film Piuma
  - Special Award for the production: Andrea Iervolino for In Dubious Battle (Il Cinema nel Giardino)

=== Enrico Fulchignoni – CICT-UNESCO Award ===
- Hotel Salvation Shubhashish Bhutiani

=== Future Film Festival Digital Award ===
- Arrival by Denis Villeneuve
  - Special mention: Voyage of Time: Life's Journey by Terrence Malick

=== Giovani Giurati del Vittorio Veneto Film Festival Award ===
- The Distinguished Citizen by Gastón Duprat & Mariano Cohn

=== Green Drop Award ===
- Spira Mirabilis by Massimo D’Anolfi and Martina Parenti
- Voyage of Time: Life's Journey by Terrence Malick

=== Human Rights Nights Special Award ===
- Bitter Money by Wang Bing
  - Special mention: Robinù by Michele Santoro

=== Interfilm Award ===
- White Sun by Deepak Rauniyar

=== Lanterna Magica Award (CGS) ===
- Dark Night by Tim Sutton

=== Leoncino d'Oro Agiscuola Award ===
- On the Milky Road by Emir Kusturica

=== Cinema for UNICEF mention ===
- Paradise by Andrei Konchalovsky

=== Golden Mouse ===
- Jackie by Pablo Larraín
- Silver Mouse: Austerlitz by Sergei Loznitsa

=== NuovoImaie Talent Award ===
- Best Young Actor: Daniele Parisi for his role in Ears
- Best Young Actress: Camilla Diana for Tommaso by Kim Rossi Stuart

=== Francesco Pasinetti Special Prize ===
- the cast of Piuma by Roan Johnson

=== Sfera 1932 Award ===
- Spira Mirabilis by Massimo D’Anolfi and Martina Parenti

=== SIGNIS Award ===
- Piuma by Roan Johnson
  - Special mention: On the Milky Road by Emir Kusturica

=== C. Smithers Foundation – CICT-UNESCO Award ===
- The Bleeder by Philippe Falardeau

=== Soundtrack Stars Award ===
- Jovanotti for Summertime by Gabriele Muccino

=== Sorriso Diverso Venezia Award - Best Italian Film ===
- These Days by Giuseppe Piccioni
- The Greatest Dream by Michele Vannucci

=== Sorriso Diverso Venezia Award - Best Foreign Film ===
- The Woman Who Left by Lav Diaz

=== Padre Nazareno Taddei Award ===
- Paradise by Andrei Konchalovsky

=== Kinèo Awards ===
- Best Film: Perfect Strangers by Paolo Genovese
- Best Director: Daniele Luchetti for Call Me Francis
- Best Debut Director: Them who? by Francesco Micciché and Fabio Bonifacci
- SNCCI Audience and Critics Award: Roberto Andò for Le confessioni
- Movie&Art TaorminaFilmFest Award: Marco Giallini
- RAI Com Award for Best Italian foreign release: They Call Me Jeeg by Gabriele Mainetti
- Best Movie Award: Gabriele Mainetti for They Call Me Jeeg
- Excellence Award: Patty Pravo
- International Movie Award: Sophie Turner
- Best Actor: Claudio Santamaria for They Call Me Jeeg
- Best Actress: Paola Cortellesi for The Last Will Be the Last
- Special Ferragamo Parfums Award for Best Actress: Anna Foglietta for Perfect Strangers
- Best Movie's poll for best film: The Last Will Be the Last by Massimiliano Bruno
- Best Supporting Actor: Alessandro Borghi for Suburra
- Best Supporting Actress: Matilde Gioli for Belli di papà and Un posto sicuro
- Excellence Award: Claudio Brachino
- Excellence Award We World: Carolina Crescentini
- Excellence Award: Laura Delli Colli

=== 3rd Starlight Cinema Awards ===
- Career Award: Ottavia Piccolo
- Career Award: Giancarlo De Cataldo
- International Award: Moon So-ri
- Best Directorial Debut: Gabriele Mainetti for They Call Me Jeeg
- Best Actor: Claudio Santamaria for They Call Me Jeeg
- Best Short: La (ri) partenza by Milena Mancini and Vinicio Marchioni
- Social Trend Topic Award: Tini: The Movie
