= Stadtpark =

Stadtpark may refer to:

- Stadtpark, Vienna, a public park in Vienna, Austria
- Hamburg Stadtpark, a public park in Hamburg, Germany
- Stadtpark (Vienna U-Bahn), a station on line U4
