= Yves Jeuland =

French author and director

Yves Jeuland (born 1968) is a French author and director of documentary films, best known for his archival and direct cinema films.

== Genres ==
Many of Jeuland's films are about political engagement or the practice of power. Between 1999 and 2001, he followed Bertrand Delanoë for the Parisian municipal election in Paris à tout prix. He traces the history of the French communists in Camarades in 2004, or the French socialists in Le siècle des Socialistes in 2005. In 2010, he directed Le Président, where he filmed Georges Frêche during his last political campaign. In 2014, he directed Un temps de président, a documentary on the daily life of the French president François Hollande. His movie Les gens du Monde, about the work of the journalists of the daily newspaper was part of the Official Selection of the 2014 Cannes Film Festival. He also directed other genres: Bleu, blanc, rose (2002), overviews the history of the LGBT movement in France.

== Awards ==
The film Paris à tout pris won the 7 d'Or for best documentary series.

In 2007, his film Comme un Juif en France (Being Jewish in France) a three-hour documentary on the history of Jews and anti-Semitism in France from the 19th century to the present day won the Lia Award of Jerusalem Film Festival.

In 2013 and in 2017, he won the prize for the best television documentary by the French Syndicate of Cinéma Critics: once for Il est minuit, Paris s'éveille, on post-war Parisian nights with the testimonies of Jean Rochefort, Juliette Gréco and Charles Aznavour, and the second time for Un Français nommé Gabin, a portrait on the career and the life of Jean Gabin. Un Français nommé Gabin was also selected for the French Film Festival.

In 2021 he released the documentary film Charlie Chaplin, the genius of Liberty, selected at Cannes Classics (classic cinema section of the Cannes Festival) and previewed at the opening of the Lumière Film Festival in October 2020.

== Filmography ==
- 1998: Ombres de cristal (TV)
- 2001: Paris à tout prix (TV), about the Paris municipal election in 2001. Best documentary by 7 d'Or
- 2002: Bleu, blanc, rose (TV)
- 2004: La Paix nom de Dieu ! (TV) shot in Israel and Palestine in 2003
- 2004: Camarades, il était une fois les communistes français (TV)
- 2004: Maris à tout prix (TV)
- 2005: Le Siècle des socialistes (TV)
- 2007: Comme un juif en France, dans la joie ou la douleur (TV) – Lia Award of Jerusalem Film Festival
- 2007: Parts de Marchais, Georges le cathodique (TV)
- 2008: Un village en campagne (TV)
- 2010: Les Compagnons de l'aube (TV) about the Free France
- 2010: Le Président (cinéma) about the last campaign of Georges Frêche
- 2012: Il est minuit, Paris s'éveille about the Parisian night life of cabarets after the WW2. Price 2013 of the best documentary by the French Syndicate of Cinéma Critics.
- 2013: Delanoë libéré (TV)
- 2014: Les Gens du Monde (cinema)
- 2015: Un temps de président (TV), about the French President François Hollande
- 2017: L'extravagant Monsieur Piccoli (TV)
- 2017: Un Français nommé Gabin (TV). Price 2017 of the best documentary by the French Syndicate of Cinéma Critics. The film was also selected for the French Film Festival.
- 2018: La Vie balagan de Marceline Loridan-Ivens
- 2020: Charlie Chaplin, le génie de la liberté (Charlie Chaplin, the Genius of Liberty), selected at Cannes Classic 2020
