= Drum (2016 film) =

Drum - Tabl
- طبل
- Directed by: Keywan Karimi
- Screenplay by: Keywan Karimi
- Produced by: François D'Artemare Keywan Karimi
- Starring: Amirreza Naderi Sara Gholizade Ibrahim Zanjanian Elyas Rasouli Habib Honaramooz Ardalan Haji Rahim Ahmad Ghoorchi Seyed Ali khebreh Farshchi Mohammad Safajooee
- Cinematography: Amin Jafari
- Edited by: Farahnaz Sharifi
- Music by: Bamdad Afshar
- Release date: 2016
- Running time: 95 minutes
- Countries: Iran, France
- Language: Persian

"Drum" (Original title: Tabl, Persian: طبل) is a 2016 Iranian feature film, written and directed by Iranian independent director Keywan Karimi.

The film depicts the story of a lawyer in Tehran City and is shot in black and white. Karimi has written the screenplay based on a book of the same name by Ali-Morad Fadaei-Nia.

The Drum was accepted in the competition section of the Critic's Week of the 73rd Venice International Film Festival and competed with the seven other films in this section for the Golden Lion of the Venice Film Festival 2016.

== Synopsis ==
The atmosphere is dreamlike, the characters have no name, neither the streets. Teheran is the only character whose name is constantly evoked. A lawyer, as many others, works and lives alone in his apartment, which is both his office and his home. In a cold and rainy day, a man burst into his apartment, speaks to him shortly and confusingly and gives him a package that will completely change his life.

== Music Production Credits ==
Music production credits for The Drum include the works of Bamdad Afshar who worked on the film's music component as Sound Designer and Musician

== Cast ==
- Amirreza Naderi
- Sara Gholizade
- Ibrahim Zanjanian
- Elyas Rasouli
- Habib Honaramooz
- Ardalan Haji Rahim
- Ahmad Ghoorchi
- Ali Farschchi
- Mohammad Safajooee

== See also ==
- The official trailer of Drum for Venice International Film Festival
- Keywan Karimi
- Writing on The City
