= The Last of Us (disambiguation) =

The Last of Us is a media franchise that includes:

- The Last of Us (video game), a 2013 action-adventure game
- The Last of Us (TV series), a 2023 television series based on the video game series

The Last of Us may also refer to:

- The Last of Us (film), a 2016 Tunisian drama film
