= The Souffleur =

2025 dark comedy film

- Promotional poster
- Directed by: Gastón Solnicki
- Written by: Gastón Solnicki; Julia Niemann
- Produced by: Gastón Solnicki; Gabriele Kranzelbinder; Paolo Calamita; Eugenio Fernández Abril
- Starring: Willem Dafoe; Lilly Lindner; Claus Philipp; Stephanie Argerich
- Cinematography: Rui Pocas
- Edited by: Ana Godoy; Alan Martín Segal
- Production companies: Little Magnet Film; KGP Filmproduktion; Primo; Filmy Wiktora
- Release date: 31 August 2025 (Venice)
- Running time: 78 minutes
- Countries: Austria; Argentina
- Language: English

The Souffleur is a 2025 black comedy film produced, written and directed by Gastón Solnicki. Starring Willem Dafoe, Lilly Lindner, Claus Philipp and Stephanie Argerich.

The film had its world premiere in the Orizzonti section of the 82nd Venice International Film Festival on 31 August 2025.

== Premise ==
After managing an iconic hotel, the InterContinental Vienna for thirty years, Lucius learns the building has been sold to a developer who intends to demolish and reimagine it.

== Cast ==
- Willem Dafoe as Tenured Hotelier
- Lilly Lindner
- Claus Philipp
- Stephanie Argerich

== Production ==
In August 2024, it was announced Gastón Solnicki would direct the film, from a screenplay co-written with Julia Niemann. In May 2025, Willem Dafoe, Lilly Lindner, Claus Philipp and Stephanie Argerich were announced to have joined the cast, with the film in post-production.

== Release ==
The film had its world premiere at the 82nd Venice International Film Festival in the Orizzonti section.
