= Ears (film) =

2016 comedy film

- Directed by: Alessandro Aronadio
- Screenplay by: Alessandro Aronadio; Valerio Cilio (collaboration)
- Starring: Daniele Parisi; Francesca Antonelli; Silvana Bosi; Masaria Colucci; Silvia D'Amico; Piera Degli Esposti; Ivan Franěk; Sonia Gessner; Paolo Giovannucci; Rocco Papaleo; Andrea Purgatori; Re Salvador; Niccolò Senni; Pamela Villoresi; Milena Vukotic; Massimo Wertmüller
- Cinematography: Francesco Di Giacomo
- Edited by: Roberto Di Tanna
- Music by: Santi Pulvirenti
- Release date: 2016
- Language: Italian

Ears (Italian: Orecchie) is a 2016 Italian comedy film written and directed by Alessandro Aronadio. It premiered at the 73rd edition of the Venice Film Festival.

== Cast ==
- Daniele Parisi as Him
- Silvia D'Amico as Alice
- Pamela Villoresi as Rosanna
- Ivan Franek as Nikolaj
- Rocco Papaleo as Giancarlo
- Piera Degli Esposti as Newspaper Editor
- Milena Vukotic as Miss Marinetti
- Paolo Giovannucci as Remo
- Andrea Purgatori as Otolaryngologist
- Massimo Wertmüller as Gastroenterologist
- Francesca Antonelli as Emergency Room Clerk
- Niccolò Senni as Fast Food Clerk
- Silvana Bosi as Nun
- Sonia Gessner as Neighbor

== Production ==
The film was shot in black and white and uses a metaphorical aspect ratio, which starts in 1:1 and gradually expands to 1.85.1.

== Release ==
The film premiered at the 73rd Venice International Film Festival, in the Biennale College - Cinema sidebar, and was awarded the Young Cinema Award for best Italian film. The film was also screened at the Seattle International Film Festival.

== Reception ==
The film was nominated as best comedy film at the 2017 Silver Ribbon Awards. Giampietro Balia from Cineuropa described it as a "sardonic take on our human condition", whose "even-keeled satire spares nobody", and paired it to Jan-Ole Gerster's A Coffee in Berlin, even if "Aronadio goes one step further, bending the rules of composition to serve the higher purpose of trapping the protagonist in a claustrophobic and stifling space".
