= Being Jewish in France =

- Written by: Yves Jeuland
- Directed by: Yves Jeuland
- Country of origin: France
- Original language: French

Original release
- Release: 2007

Being Jewish in France (French: Comme un Juif en France) is a 2007 documentary film originally shown on French TV, about the history of Jewish life in France from the 19th century (Dreyfus Affair, 1894-1906) to the present day. The film, written and directed by French cinematographer Yves Jeuland, had its North American premiere at the Atlanta Jewish Film Festival on 21 January 2008.
