= Kékszakállú =

2016 film

- Film poster
- Directed by: Gastón Solnicki
- Written by: Gastón Solnicki
- Starring: Laila Maltz; Katia Szechtman; Lara Tarlowski; Natali Maltz
- Cinematography: Diego Poleri; Fernando Lockett
- Edited by: Alan Segal; Francisco D’Eufemia
- Release date: 7 September 2016 (Venice)
- Running time: 72 minutes
- Country: Argentina
- Language: Spanish
- Budget: €450,000

Kékszakállú (English: Bluebeard) is a 2016 Argentine drama film written and directed by Gastón Solnicki. It was screened in the Orizzonti section at the 73rd Venice International Film Festival. It is Solnicki's first narrative feature, after his previous documentary films Süden and Papirosen.

The film chronicles the coming-of-age of a group of female teenagers in Argentina, not quite knowing what to do with their future. It is only very loosely inspired by Bluebeard's Castle, the Hungarian one-act opera by Béla Bartók and Béla Balázs. Solnicki said that he wanted to attain the "atmosphere and horror" of the original opera, yet with his own characters.

== Plot ==
The film observes a group of adolescent girls—unnamed to the audience—on the brink of adulthood. They are first seen vacationing in Punta del Este, Uruguay, before returning home to Buenos Aires, Argentina. The main character (Laila Maltz) still lives with her father, and after some hesitation takes up a small-time job in his Styrofoam factory. She is reluctant to engage with the work, however, and spends most of her time in the company of her friends, as well as searching for an appropriate field of study. The friends are also evaluating different educational options, and at one point eat an octopus dinner together. After an ellipsis in the narrative, the film sees Laila abandoning her homestead on a ferry heading for Chuy, Uruguay.

== Production ==
The film is a very loose adaptation of the one-act opera Bluebeard's Castle (Hungarian: A kékszakállú herceg vára) by the Hungarian composer Béla Bartók, with the libretto adapted by Béla Balázs from the folktale "Bluebeard" by 17th-century French writer Charles Perrault. Kékszakállú has few similarities with the narrative of the opera, as Solnicki was not interested in "matching" the characters or "imitating the story", preferring rather to find the "cinematic materials" in the opera. Solnicki commended Bartók's audacity in adapting the structure of Perrault's tale to his own needs, noting that in Bartók's version, Bluebeard is "not the monster but the victim."

Solnicki has also cited as an influence Fritz Lang's noir-adaptation of the folktale Secret Beyond the Door... (1948), which the main character watches in the beginning of the film.

He used a 40 mm lens and direct sound to capture the ambience of the character's existence, maintaining that it was "John Ford’s favorite lens for shooting a man on a horse".

== Reception ==
The film was released to critical acclaim at the 73rd Venice International Film Festival. It was in particular praised for its minimalist and elliptical approach to narrative, and comparisons were made to other Argentine directors, such as Lucrecia Martel, Martín Rejtman and Lisandro Alonso.
