= InterContinental Vienna =

Hotel in Vienna, Austria

Coordinates: 48°12′07″N 16°22′44″E

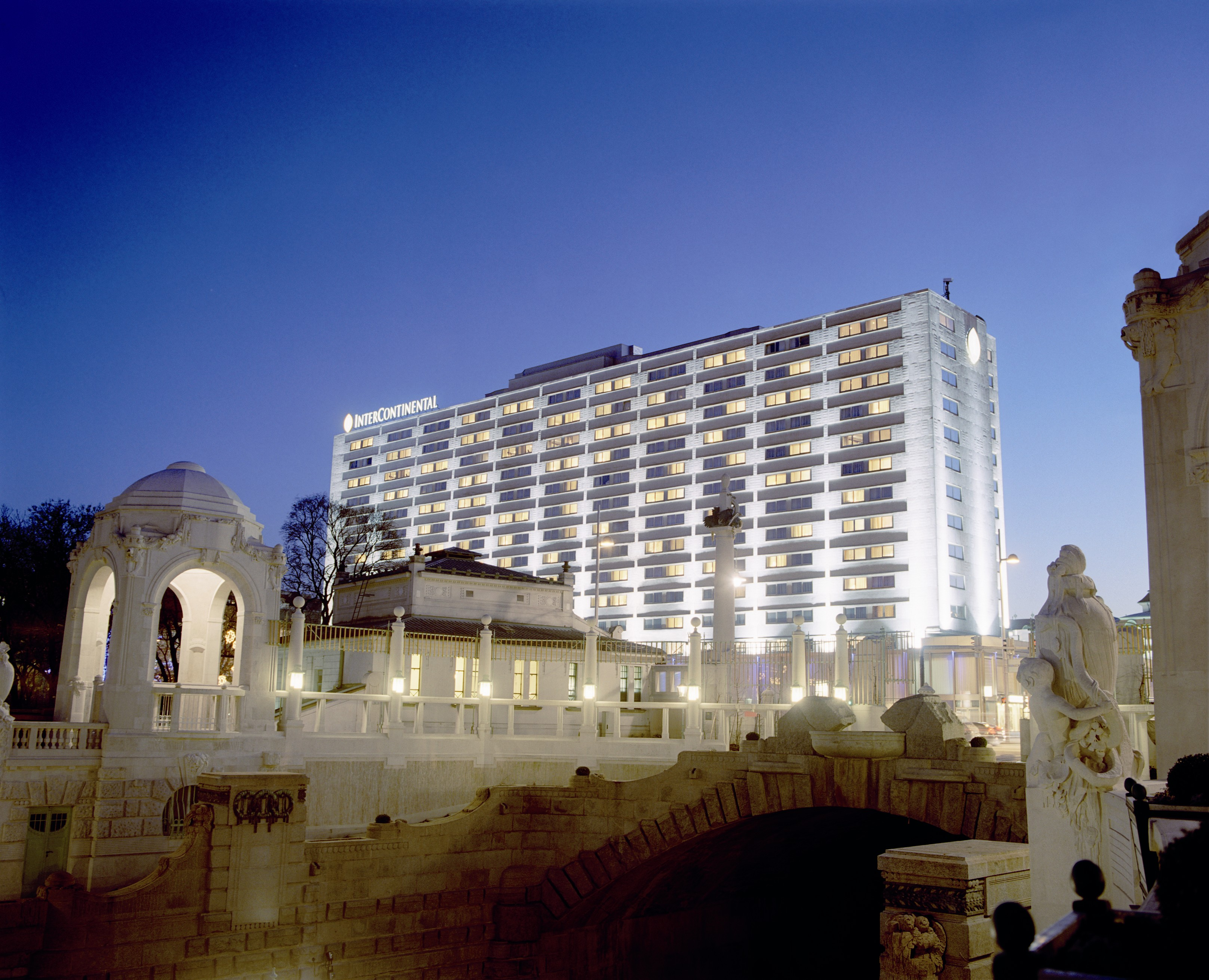
InterContinental Vienna Stadtpark view

The InterContinental Vienna is a hotel in Vienna. It has a total of 458 guest rooms and suites and conference facilities with 1,200 m².

== Location ==
The hotel is a detached building located between the Vienna Stadtpark and the Vienna Konzerthaus. The Stadtpark underground station is located next to the hotel on Johannesgasse.

== History ==
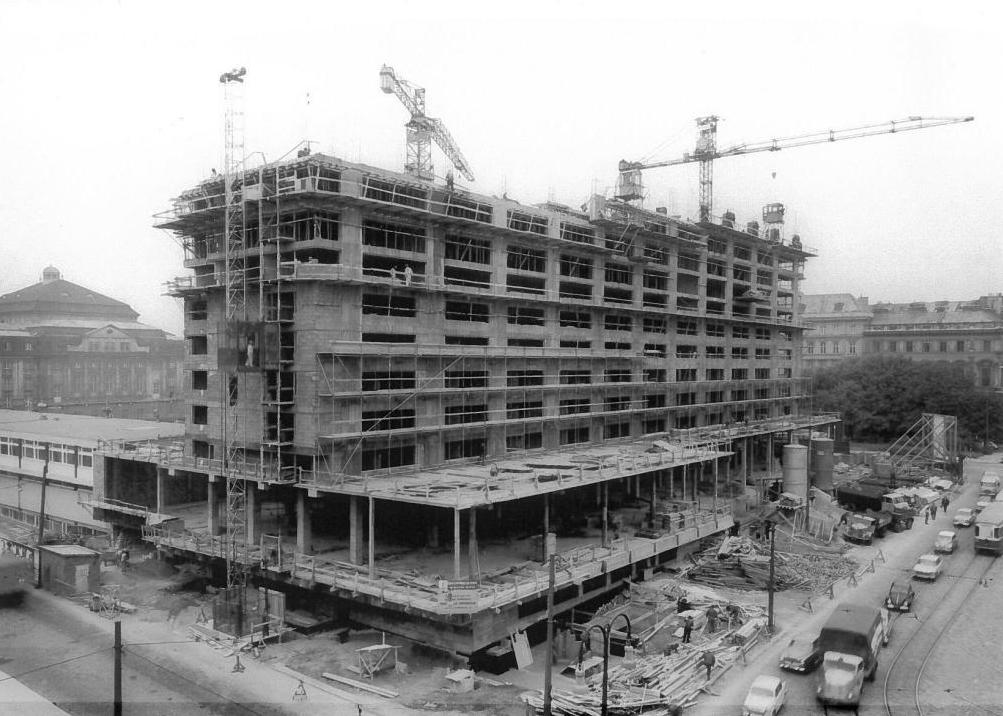
Construction of the InterContinental Vienna 1963

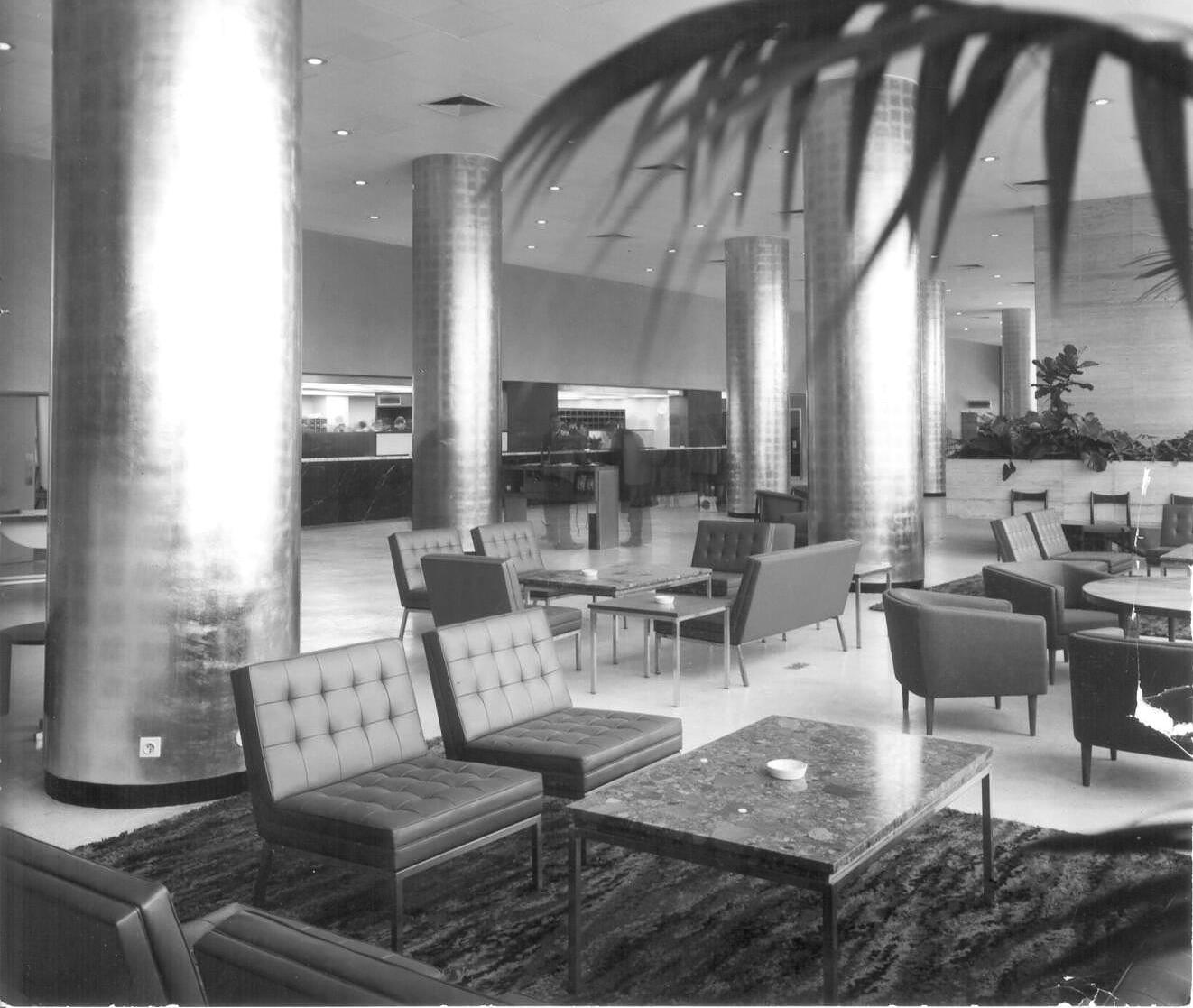
InterContinental Wien Lobby 1964

InterContinental Vienna, which opened on March 4, 1964, was the first hotel belonging to an international chain to open in Vienna. Upon completion, there were 504 rooms on 12 levels.

When the InterContinental Vienna opened, it was the twenty-third hotel to become part of the InterContinental Hotels Group, a hotel chain founded by the airline Pan American World Airways.

The hotel plays a main role in the 2025 dark comedy The Souffleur with Willem Dafoe.

== Architecture and Construction Method ==
Holabird and Root, an architecture firm that had played a major role in the development of the steel-frame skyscrapers in the United States, was commissioned to design the hotel, and in particular, to create a corporate identity for it. The Viennese architect Carl Appel was selected as contact architect.

=== Client and Architect ===
At the time he was commissioned to prepare and supervise the construction of the InterContinental Hotel, Carl Appel was a well established architect. His office produced a number of buildings for the private and public sectors; these included office buildings, administrative buildings and apartment houses. Immediately following the Second World War, on account of their sound education and experience, Appel and colleagues such as Erich Boltenstern, Max Fellerer and Oswald Haerdtl played a role in the reconstruction of the city – a task that demanded economical construction methods. In his work, Appel was unique due to his talent in tectonics and his willingness to employ new construction methods. The facade of the hotel's reinforced-concrete structure, for example, is clad in Tyrolean sandstone and small-format, colourful mosaic stone; the casting process employed was an innovation that made the cladding particularly robust.

=== Space at a Premium ===
The InterContinental Vienna is 39 metres high, making it one of the city's first skyscrapers. The original design of the hotel envisioned a height of 50 metres, which was however ruled out due to urban planning constraints: firstly, the famed view from the Belvedere Palace to Vienna's historic centre would have been damaged, and secondly, a building of this height would have increased wind and endangering trees in the neighbouring Stadtpark. In cooperation with the city's building authority, Appel took the context into account and reduced the building height. In order to accommodate the demanding area requirements (504 hotel rooms, rooms for social events, extensive Building Services installations plus 240 parking spaces), he proposed a T-shaped floor plan and reduced the typical storey height to 2.45 metres. The city building authority approved the latter change on the grounds that the hotel was to be fully air-conditioned. The lower ceiling height was not merely an attempt to increase the hotel's floor area, but can also be considered part of a tradition dating back to the early twentieth century, when Adolf Loos developed his Raumplan: the height of a space was determined based on its use.

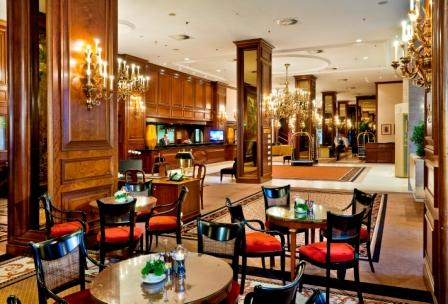
InterContinental Wien Lobby

== Literature ==
- Friedrich Achleitner: Eine Masse ohne Maß. Neues Bauen kritisch betrachtet: The Vienna InterContinental Hotel. In: Die Presse, 21./22. March 1964, p. 9
- Gudrun Hausegger: Hotel InterContinental Wien - Internationaler Funktionalismus im Herzen von Wien, May 2011

Sources for the topic 'architecture':

- Werner Blaser: Chicago Architecture. Holabird & Root. 1880–1992. Birkhäuser Verlag, Basel/Boston/Berlin 1992
- Carl Appel: Carl Appel: Architekt zwischen Gestern und Morgen. Böhlau Verlag, Wien 1988. ISBN 3-205-05090-8
