= Filofest =

Film en Video festival

Filofest logo.

The International Student Film and Video Festival Filofest is the first international festival in Slovenia that is focused on student film and video production. Filofest festival takes place every two years at the Faculty of Arts, University of Ljubljana, since 2006. The festival is organized by the students of the Faculty of Arts as well as other Ljubljana faculties.

Along with its primary role as a film festival, the International Student Film and Video Festival Filofest is accompanied by additional programme: lectures, panel discussions, exhibitions, social gatherings, etc.

Before 2014, the competition part of the programme was opened exclusively to independent student films, whose authors were amateurs without any formal film education. Films directed by students of film academies or film schools were screened within the non-competition part of the programme. In 2014, the festival opened the competition programme to all student films, but also presented a special award to an independent student film. The festival accepts fiction, documentary, animated and experimental films, and music videos.

== Awards ==
Between 2006 and 2010, the best film, which received the main award of the festival, was chosen by the audience. The festival jury also presented awards to films that entered in the competition part of the programme: the award for best film, best directing, best screenplay, best performance, best fiction film, best documentary film, best animated film, and best experimental film. In 2012 and 2014 all awards were presented by the jury, including main award for best film. In 2014, an additional award for best independent film was awarded.

== Filofest 2006 ==
Film	Directed by	Country
Best Film
PERFECT	Alen Pavšar, Robert Mastnak	Slovenia
Best Directing
TATITA	Tatita Team	Kosovo
Best Screenplay
AMOR SANJUÁN	Luis Misis Herrero	Spain, Argentina
Best Performance
PERFECT	Alen Pavšar, Robert Mastnak	Slovenia

Members of the jury gave special recognition to: ?orque, Hallucii, What Do We Need This For and Behind Closed Minds. The winning video of the video workshop was shot and edited by Agata Rosochacka, the director of the film Reflections.

== Filofest 2007 ==
Filofest 2007 was again hosted at the Faculty of Arts at the University of Ljubljana and took place between December 10 and December 14.

Film	Directed by	Country
Best Film
FREQUENT MEETINGS	Darja Kornijenko	Estonia
Best Experimental Film
EVAPORATION	Simon Chang	Taiwan/Czech Republic
Best Animated Film
DEATH	Mitja Manček	Slovenia
Best Documentary Film
BALKAN JUNCTIONS	Luksuz Production	Slovenia
Best Fiction Film
A SWAMP	Luka Puš	Slovenia
Best Screenplay
ROCHELLE'S CAFÉ	Tiago Américo	Brazil
Best Performance
EYES FULL OF WATER (Vitomir Vratarič)	Jože Baša	Slovenia
Best Direction
TERMINAL	Mario Gomes	Portugal
Special Recognition of the Jury
DEAD SERIOUS	Andrej Arsenijevič, Marija Grintal	Slovenia

The winning video of the 'Video Workshop', THE LIPSTICK AND THE RAZOR, was directed by Simon Chang (shot by Valentin Perko and edited by Arnold Marko).

== Filofest 2010 ==
Filofest 2010 was again hosted at the Faculty of Arts at the University of Ljubljana and took place between December 6 and December 10.

Film	Directed by	Country
Best Film
NEVERENDING KNOT	Miha Šubic, Mitja Mlakar, Mojca Pernat, Robert Ribič, Miha Šubic, Simon Komar	Slovenia
Best Experimental Film
JUST A GAME	Kaja Ocvirek-Krušić	Croatia
Best Animated Film
EVENING FAIRYTALE	Andraž Sedlar	Slovenia
Best Documentary Film
LEBEN IN SEIFENBLASEN	Nadine Lüchinger	Switzerland/Argentina
Best Fiction Film
MY TOWN	Žiga Divjak, Matic Drakulić, Jakob Adler	Slovenia
Best Screenplay
NEVERENDING KNOT	Miha Šubic, Mitja Mlakar, Mojca Pernat, Robert Ribič, Miha Šubic, Simon Komar	Slovenia
Best Performance
IN THE EYE OF THE BEHOLDER (Larisa Dagul)	Luka Gluvić	Slovenia
Best Direction
A REASON TO STAY	Adiya Orr	Israel
Special Recognition of the Jury
JOLLY ROGER	Matias Zemljič, Francisco ''Pako'' Amezcua	Slovenia
A BALLAD	Matevž Jerman	Slovenia

== Filofest 2012 ==
Filofest 2012 was hosted at the Faculty of Arts at the University of Ljubljana and took place between December 12 and December 14.

Film	Directed by	Country
Best Film
7 DREAMS	Alexandru Căpătoiu	Hungary
Best Directing
THE MOST PRECIOUS	Joseph Bliadze	Georgia
Best Performance
THE MOST PRECIOUS	Joseph Bliadze	Georgia
Best Fiction Film
THE MOST PRECIOUS	Joseph Bliadze	Georgia
Best Documentary Film
BROKEN BORDER	Keywan Karimi	Iran
Best Experimental Film
7 DREAMS	Alexandru Căpătoiu	Hungary
Special Recognition of the Jury
LAPINDO	Felix Jäkel	Indonesia

== Les Inattendus ==
Filofest is partnered with the Les Inattendus festival from Lyon, France.
