= Silvana Bosi =

Italian actress (1934–2020)

- Born: 23 July 1934; Ferrara, Emilia-Romagna, Italy
- Died: 10 August 2020 (aged 86); Rome, Lazio, Italy
- Occupation: Actress
- Years active: 1987–2019

Silvana Bosi (23 July 1934 – 10 August 2020) was an Italian actress.

== Biography ==
Bosi was born in Ferrara, Emilia-Romagna. Bosi appeared in dozens of European, mostly Italian, films and television programs between 1987 and 2019. She usually played character roles, as mothers and grandmothers. She had a small role in the Hollywood film The Talented Mr. Ripley (1999). She died in 2020, from pancreatic cancer at the age of 86.

== Partial filmography ==
- Soldati - 365 all'alba (1987)
- The Strangeness of Life (1987)
- Mortacci (1989)
- The Voice of the Moon (1990)
- Rossini! Rossini! (1991)
- The End Is Known (1992)
- Crazy Underwear (1992)
- Absolute Giganten (1999)
- The Talented Mr. Ripley (1999)
- Bread and Tulips (2000)
- A Journey Called Love (2002)
- Agata and the Storm (2004)
- Letters to Juliet (2010)
- The American (2010)
- Ears (2016)
