= Breakthrough (TV series) =

- Genre: Scientific documentary
- Country of origin: United States
- Original language: English
- No. of seasons: 2
- No. of episodes: 12

Production
- Executive producers: Ron Howard; Brian Grazer; Michael Rosenberg; Steve Michaels; Jonathan Koch; Ryann Lauckner; Kurt Sayenga
- Production companies: Imagine Entertainment; Asylum Entertainment

Original release
- Network: National Geographic Channel
- Release: November 1, 2015 – present

Breakthrough is a scientific documentary television series on National Geographic Channel that premiered on November 1, 2015. It is produced by Ron Howard and Brian Grazer. All of the episodes are directed by guest directors such as Friday Night Lights creator Peter Berg, actors Paul Giamatti and Angela Bassett, screenwriter Akiva Goldsman and director Shane Carruth. In July 2016, the series was renewed for a second season, with Ana Lily Amirpour, David Lowery, Shane Carruth, Shalini Kantayya, Emmett Malloy, Brendan Malloy and A.G. Rojas serving as directors.

The series covers the history of current scientific "breakthroughs" in science, including aviation, fighting pandemics, robotics, and aging. A new PBS series, Breakthrough: The Ideas That Changed the World, hosted by Patrick Stewart began airing in 2019 with six episodes, covering "The Telescope", "The Airplane", "The Robot", "The Smartphone", "The Rocket", and "The Car". Another similar series, Scientific American Frontiers, had previously aired on PBS from 1990 to 2005.
