= Ana Lily Amirpour =

American filmmaker

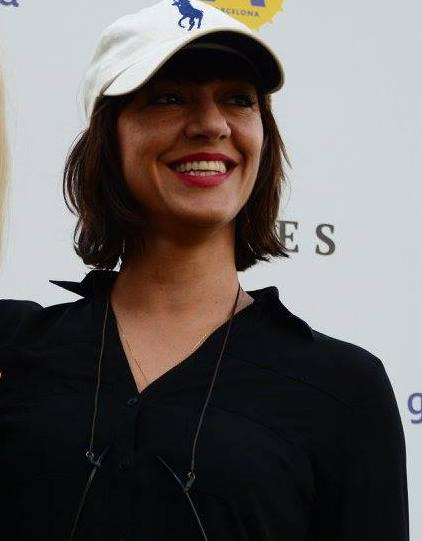
- Amirpour in 2014
- Born: Margate, Kent, England
- Education: San Francisco State University; University of California, Los Angeles
- Occupations: Film director; screenwriter
- Years active: 2009–present

Ana Lily Amirpour (Persian: آنا لیلی امیرپور) is an American filmmaker of Iranian descent. She is best known for her feature film debut A Girl Walks Home Alone at Night, promoted as "the first Iranian vampire western," which made its debut at the Sundance Film Festival in 2014, and which was based on a previous short film that she wrote and directed, which won Best Short Film at the 2012 Noor Iranian Film Festival.

== Early life ==
Amirpour was born in Margate, England to Iranian parents. She was born partially deaf. Her family moved to Miami, Florida when she was young. Her family then settled in Bakersfield, California, where she attended high school. She began studying biology at UC Santa Barbara but dropped out after one year. Later she returned to school to study painting and sculpting, attending San Francisco State University for her undergraduate degree, and then studied screenwriting at the UCLA School of Theater, Film and Television. She has been making films since she was twelve years old.

Amirpour's love for film came about when she moved to the United States with her family in the 1980s. She speaks often about the culture shock she experienced and her connection with American films. "I got hooked on them. It's how I assimilated and became American through American pop culture and music—Madonna, Michael Jackson. And movies. I was always putting on shows and stuff. My dad got a camcorder when I was 12 and I started making films and imitating commercials. Like, I would remake commercials. I wasn't like; I'm going to be a filmmaker. My parents never encouraged that; I don't know how they would have. Iranians don't do that."

== Career ==
=== Feature films ===
==== A Girl Walks Home Alone at Night (2014) ====
Amirpour's feature directorial debut was A Girl Walks Home Alone at Night, described as "the first Iranian vampire western" "with elements of film noir and the restraint of Iranian New Wave cinema" along with spaghetti Western elements. It stars Sheila Vand, Arash Marandi, Marshall Manesh, Dominic Rains, Mozhan Marnò, and Rome Shadanloo. The film built up significant buzz when it premiered at the Sundance Film Festival, eventually being picked up by Kino Lorber and distributed by VICE films. The film also won the "Revelations Prize" at the 2014 Deauville Film Festival and the Carnet Jove Jury Award, as well as the Citizen Kane Award for Best Directorial Revelation from the Sitges Film Festival. The film was also nominated for the Halekulani Golden Orchid Award at the Hawaii International Film Festival.

At the film's premiere, VICE Creative Director Eddy Moretti, whose company released the film, called Amirpour "the next Tarantino". The New York Times's A.O. Scott also remarked that the film had a "Jim Jarmusch-like cool" and a "disarmingly innocent outlaw romanticism." In the wake of the film's release, Filmmaker named her to their 2014 list of the 25 New Faces of Independent Film.

Amirpour's debut film underscores her interstitial identity as an Iranian-American through its landscape and language. Wide shots featuring the monotonous, dipping movement of dark, heavy machinery against an industrial backdrop in A Girl Walks Home Alone At Night can bring to mind either "an American suburban neighborhood" or "the oil fields of Iran." The film's language offers layered meanings for both an Iranian and American audience. For instance, an English-speaking audience may call the fictional town of the film "Bad City," whereas an Iranian audience may interpret it as "Wind City," depending on the particular audience's understanding of an English subtitle-based or Persian-based reading of Arash's license plate.

==== The Bad Batch (2016) ====
Amirpour described her second film, an English-language film entitled The Bad Batch as "a post-apocalyptic cannibal love story set in a Texas wasteland" where a "muscled cannibal breaks the rule 'don't play with your food'" – "It's Road Warrior meets Pretty in Pink with a dope soundtrack." She has also described it as "very violent" and "very romantic" and like "El Topo meets Dirty Dancing". The film stars Suki Waterhouse, Jason Momoa, Jim Carrey, and Keanu Reeves. It premiered at the 73rd Venice International Film Festival on September 6, 2016, and won the Special Jury prize.

==== Mona Lisa and the Blood Moon (2021) ====
Amirpour's third feature film is Mona Lisa and the Blood Moon, starring Jun Jong-seo and Kate Hudson. The movie is described as "a mind-bending adventure set in the humid, neon-lit streets of New Orleans. Inspired by adventure films of the 1980s and '90s, the film follows a young girl with special abilities. After escaping from an asylum, she returns to the chaotic reality around her, making unexpected allies along the way." It was filmed in New Orleans in summer 2019 and was produced by John Lesher. It had its world premiere at the 78th Venice International Film Festival on September 5, 2021, and was released in the United States on September 30, 2022, by Saban Films.

==== Cliffhanger (2026) ====
In May 2019, Amirpour announced that she would have directed a female-led reboot of the 1993 film Cliffhanger. Jason Momoa was a principal actor. But by May 2023, it was officially reported that the reboot will be redeveloped as a legacy-sequel instead. Ric Roman Waugh replaced Amirpour as director and Sylvester Stallone returned to reprise his role from the original, in addition to taking on a role as producer. The sequel will have a presence at Cannes, where distributing studios will be decided. No release date has been set.

As of May 2023, Amirpour was no longer attached to the project.

==== Basketful of Heads (TBA) ====
In February 2025, it was announced that Amirpour will write and direct a movie based on the comic book series Basketful of Heads. Natasha Lyonne will star and produce.

=== Short films ===
Amirpour has written, produced and directed several short films before her directorial debut with A Girl Walks Home Alone at Night. Among them was a 2011 short of the same name, which won a "Best Short Film" award at the 2012 Noor Iranian Film Festival and features Nazanin Boniadi in the role played by Sheila Vand in the feature, as well as Marshall Manesh and Dominic Rains from the feature film version.

Among these short films is also A Little Suicide (2012), which received nominations for Best Short Film from the Edinburgh International Film Festival, the Oldenburg Film Festival and the Zlin International Film Festival for Children and Youth; Pashmaloo (2011), also starring Sheila Vand from the feature film version of A Girl Walks Home Alone at Night and screened at Berlinale (Berlin International Film Festival) in 2011; Ketab (2010), which stars Sheila Vand, and Marshall Manesh from A Girl Walks Home Alone at Night; True Love (2010), which won an Audience Award for Best International Short from the Milano International Film Festival Awards; You (2009), a music video featuring San Francisco rock duo Juanita and the Rabbit; and Six and a Half (2009).

Amirpour has written the short film I Feel Stupid (2012) (directed by Milena Pastreich), and part of the story for the feature film The Garlock Incident (2012), in which she also stars.

In January 2018, Amirpour released a short film for fashion house Kenzo, entitled Yo! My Saint in which she collaborated with indie musicians and actors Karen O, Michael Kiwanuka, Alex Zhang Hungtai, and Kiko Mizuhara. Karen O and Kiwanuka composed the film's song of the same name, while Zhang and Mizuhara star in the film.

=== Television ===
In July 2016, it was announced Amirpour would direct an episode of the documentary series Breakthrough for National Geographic Channel.

In 2018, Amirpour directed episode two of the second season of Legion.

In April 2019, Amirpour directed "A Traveler", an Alaska-set episode of Jordan Peele's Twilight Zone. The episode stars Steven Yeun, Marika Sila, and Greg Kinnear and was written by X-Files veteran Glen Morgan. In 2020, she directed another show episode titled "Ovation".

Amirpour directed the pilot episode of the crime-drama series Briarpatch, which aired in February 2020.

Amirpour directed "The Outside", the 4th episode of the horror anthology streaming television series Guillermo del Toro's Cabinet of Curiosities, which aired on October 26, 2022.

Armipour directed "A Family Matter" and "A Good Agent", the 5th and 6th episodes of the Netflix television series The Night Agent.

=== Other works ===
==== A Girl Walks Home Alone At Night (Comic Series) ====
After the release of A Girl Walks Home Alone At Night, Amirpour wrote an e-comic miniseries of the same name focusing on the backstory of The Girl and featuring illustrations by Michael DeWeese. The two issues, titled Death is the Answer and Who Am I, were published by RADCO in 2014.

== Style and themes ==
Amirpour's films are known for being highly stylized and her creative choices often revolve around the mixing and meshing of cultural backgrounds and genres. She emphasizes worldbuilding, and the setting plays a vital role in her films. In an interview with Matt Mullen from Interview Magazine, she explains, "I think locations are as important as a character in a story—the whole personality of the place. I'm into creating an immersive, transportive experience. And there are so many interesting places on Earth already."

Music and score are important to her work. Her two released films feature eclectic soundtracks that play a major role in establishing character feelings and settings. "I love music and whenever I start thinking of a story or characters, music always pops up. It's just as much an outfit as you'd think they would wear. The music they listen to will tell you more about their character." These qualities feature significantly in A Girl Walks Home Alone at Night, a film that is widely regarded as the "first Iranian vampire western."

Inspiration from the Eastern and Western worlds are equally present in all her work, mainly influenced by Amirpour's experience as a first-generation Iranian-American. Themes of outcasts, rebels, and "otherness" are a staple to her filmography to date, which she attributes to her personal history of feeling out of place. "I'm a brown woman immigrant, my family escaped the Iranian Revolution, I grew up on two continents, and English wasn't the first language in my home. I know what it is to be the 'other' very well." These themes usually revolve around central female characters who are outcasts in their own worlds and must find a way to break free from the molds they've been confined to by society. Yet when confronted with the question of feminism, she explains that her debut film "can be feminist if that's what people think," while still prompting her critics and audience to consider her individuality as an artist separate from her womanhood. Amirpour quips, "I wonder if when Tarantino made Kill Bill, did people say he was a feminist? It's weird. I wonder if like, 'Oh a female and so she's battling misogyny.'" However, women are not the only source of outcasts in her films. In a Q&A with Roger Corman about A Girl Walks Home Alone at Night, Amirpour explained that "all the characters in the story are isolated and grappling with something that keeps them away from other people and themselves and from knowing what they want and from figuring out how to get it." She has noted that she finds her characters from a secret place within herself: "I like outcasts, I'm always drawn to the people that don't neatly fit into the conventional shit that's all around, the system. But, for what I'm writing right now, once again, it's all about this shit that I'm trying to figure out."

Another signature characteristic of Amirpour's film-making is her embrace of the political. Although she approaches any feminist reading of A Girl Walks Home Alone At Night with a level of reserve, Amirpour hopes her audience will appreciate the film's representation of a drag-wearing, silent character named Rockabilly who she describes as gay and Bitch Media calls genderqueer. Amirpour says, "If there's one political thing [in the movie], it's not the chador; it's Rockabilly because it's not OK to be gay in Iran." With Bad Batch, Amirpour claimed a popular political interpretation of her work that moves beyond her original intention. She created the film in 2015 with the vision of depicting society's outcasts and later donned the anti-Trump message ascribed to it. The film was also meant to critique modern capitalism and consumerist ideology, as motifs of overindulgence and consumption took center stage, themes that were also present in her first feature.

Amirpour's films often value images and framing over dialogue. When questioned about the sparse dialogue in her films, she said, "For me, it's interesting that people take the lack of dialogue as there is no story. It makes people uncomfortable, which I understand." Her prioritization of visuals has garnered acclaim: A Girl Walks Home Alone At Night received two nominations for Best Cinematography at the Chlotrudis Awards and Independent Spirit Awards, and won the Dublin Film Critics Award for the same category.

Various film directors have had an impact on Amirpour's style: David Lynch, Francis Ford Coppola, Robert Zemeckis, and Sergio Leone. In an interview with IU Cinema, she expressed that she finds inspiration from film-makers, writers, photographers and music. Anne Rice was the major influence for A Girl Walks Home Alone At Night, and Bruce Lee remains one of her biggest artistic heroes (his book Striking Thoughts is one she continually returns to for inspiration). Films that she has found inspiring throughout her life and career include The NeverEnding Story, Back to the Future, Sin City, and Pulp Fiction.

== Filmography ==
Short film

- Six and a Half (2009)
- True Love (2010)
- Ketab (2010)
- Pashmaloo (2011)
- A Girl Walks Home Alone at Night (2011)
- A Little Suicide (2012)
- Yo! My Saint (for Kenzo) (2017)

Feature film

Year	Title	Director	Writer
2012	The Garlock Incident	No	Yes
2014	A Girl Walks Home Alone at Night	Yes	Yes
2016	The Bad Batch	Yes	Yes
2021	Mona Lisa and the Blood Moon	Yes	Yes
TBA	Please, Give Me You	Yes	Yes

Television

Year	Title	Episode(s)
2017	Breakthrough	"Curing Cancer"
2018	Legion	"Chapter 10"
2018	Castle Rock	"Past Perfect"
2019	The Twilight Zone	"A Traveler"
2020	The Twilight Zone	"Ovation"
2020	Briarpatch	"Pilot"
2020	Homemade	"Ride It Out"
2022	Guillermo del Toro's Cabinet of Curiosities	"The Outside"
2025	The Night Agent	"A Family Matter"
2025	The Night Agent	"A Good Agent"

Music video

Year	Title	Artist	Ref.
2009	"You"	Juanita and the Rabbit	
2022	"Suéltame"	Christina Aguilera and Tini	

Acting roles

Year	Title	Role
2012	A Little Suicide	The Butterfly (narration)
2012	The Garlock Incident	Lily
2014	A Girl Walks Home Alone at Night	Skeleton Partygirl
2020	Homemade	Bike Rider

== Awards and nominations ==
Year	Title	Festival	Category	Result
2012	A Little Suicide (short)	Edinburgh International Film Festival	Best International Short Film	Nominated
2012	A Girl Walks Home Alone At Night (short)	Noor Iranian Film Festival	Best Short Film	Won
2014-15	A Girl Walks Home Alone at Night	Independent Spirit Awards	Best First Feature	Nominated
2014-15	A Girl Walks Home Alone at Night	Independent Spirit Awards	Someone to Watch Award	Nominated
2014-15	A Girl Walks Home Alone at Night	London Film Festival	Best Film	Nominated
2014-15	A Girl Walks Home Alone at Night	Sundance Film Festival	Audience Award	Nominated
2014-15	A Girl Walks Home Alone at Night	Sitges Film Festival	Citizen Kane Award – Best Directorial Revelation	Won
2014-15	A Girl Walks Home Alone at Night	Sitges Film Festival	Carnet Jove Jury Award	Won
2014-15	A Girl Walks Home Alone at Night	Sitges Film Festival	Special Mention	Won
2014-15	A Girl Walks Home Alone at Night	Hawaii International Film Festival	Special Mention	Won
2014-15	A Girl Walks Home Alone at Night	Hawaii International Film Festival	Halekulani Golden Orchid Award – Narrative Feature	Nominated
2014-15	A Girl Walks Home Alone at Night	Gotham Awards	Bingham Ray Breakthrough Director Award	Won
2014-15	A Girl Walks Home Alone at Night	Gotham Awards	Audience Award	Nominated
2014-15	A Girl Walks Home Alone at Night	Deauville American Film Festival	Revelations Prize	Won
2014-15	A Girl Walks Home Alone at Night	Deauville American Film Festival	Grand Special Prize	Nominated
2016	The Bad Batch	Venice Film Festival	Special Jury Prize	Won
2016	The Bad Batch	Venice Film Festival	Golden Lion	Nominated
2021	Mona Lisa and the Blood Moon	Venice Film Festival	Golden Lion	Nominated
