= Richard Leibert =

American organist and recording artist

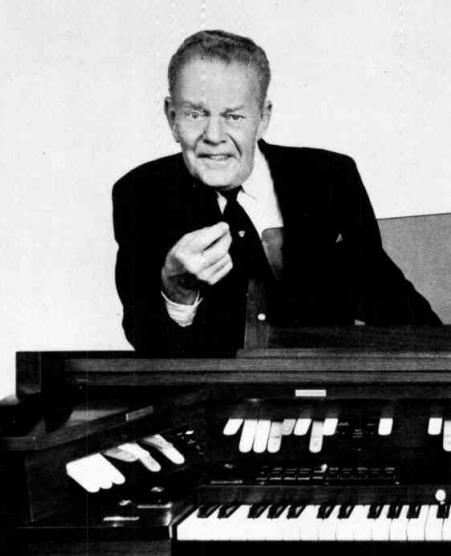
- Leibert in a 1970 DownBeat advertisement
- Born: April 29, 1903; Bethlehem, Pennsylvania, U.S.
- Died: October 22, 1976 (aged 73); Fort Myers, Florida, U.S.
- Education: Peabody Conservatory of Music
- Occupation: Organist
- Years active: 1924–1971

Richard William "Dick" Leibert (April 29, 1903 – October 22, 1976) was an American musician who was the chief organist at New York City's Radio City Music Hall between 1932 and 1971. He also had a radio program of organ music on the NBC Radio Network in the 1930s and 1940s, along with making phonograph recordings on the RCA Victor and Westminster Records labels.

== Early years ==
Loew's Palace Theater in Washington, D.C., where Leibert was organist as a teenager

Born on April 29, 1903, in Bethlehem, Pennsylvania, to Mr. and Mrs. Joseph M. Leibert, young Richard Leibert displayed an early talent for music, playing songs by ear on his family's piano as a young child. He first played the organ in public as a 7-year-old. When he was fifteen, Leibert's family moved to Washington, D.C., and he began playing as a substitute theater organist at Loew's Palace Theater there.

Leibert attended college at George Washington University in Washington, D.C., and studied organ at the Peabody Conservatory of Music in Baltimore, Maryland. He entertained President Calvin Coolidge, playing the piano at the White House East Room. He briefly had a touring dance band, playing the piano with the ensemble himself, but soon embarked on his career as a full-time theater organist.

== Organist career ==
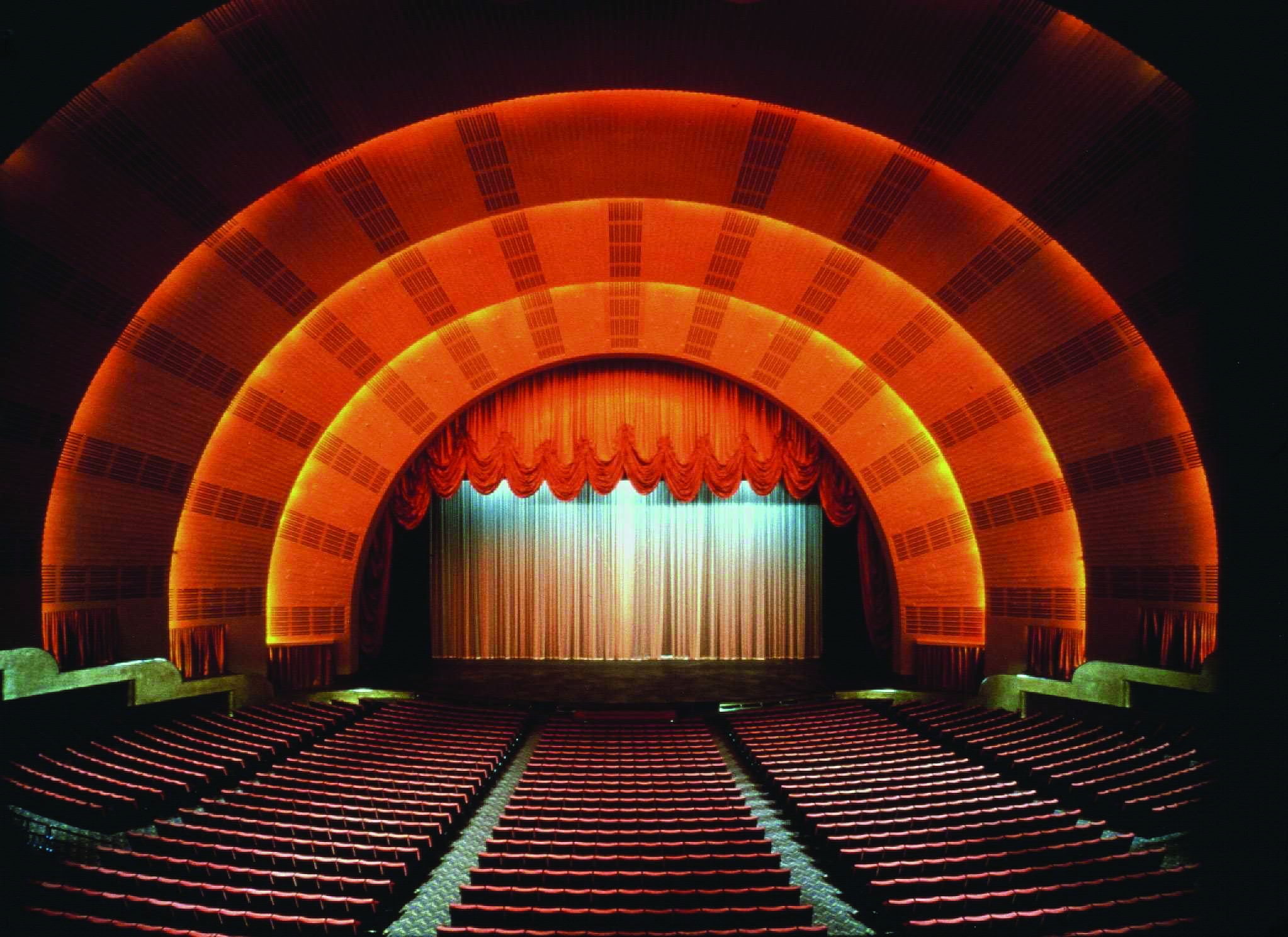
Radio City Music Hall. Its twin organ consoles are in alcoves on both sides of the stage

By the late 1920s, Leibert had established his reputation as a skilled theater organist, renowned for his arrangements of popular melodies, including imaginative reharmonisation and bridges, as well as syncopation and transposition. In 1927, he played in the inaugural show at Loew’s Penn Theatre in Pittsburgh, Pennsylvania, continuing as the regular organist there until 1932. In the era of talking pictures when theater organists no longer provided silent film accompaniment and sound effects, Leibert offered 15-minute "organlogues" to entertain movie audiences in between feature films and other acts. His popular organlogues might include a classical piece, such as the Poet and Peasant overture by Franz von Suppé, various popular songs, and accompanying audience sing-alongs, preceding the feature-length film. The evening's playbill at the Penn Theatre on August 23, 1931, was typical: a stage show with dancers, an orchestra number, one of Leibert's organlogues, and then the feature film, Pardon Us, starring Laurel and Hardy.

In 1932, Leibert was organist at New York's Brooklyn Paramount Theatre, playing its still extant Wurlitzer organ, a four manual, 26-rank instrument with 1,838 pipes. A music critic for the Brooklyn Times-Union said Leibert's performances there were those of a "master of the classics [who] usually manages to weave a finer piece of music into his songfest of popular melodies".

When the Radio City Music Hall opened in Manhattan on December 27, 1932, Leibert was appointed chief organist. In his new position, he played the Music Hall's "Mighty Wurlitzer" pipe organ, the biggest Wurlitzer theater organ ever built, for thirty shows each week. Leibert had at his command an organ having twin 4-manual consoles so that both he and another organist could play the instrument's 58 ranks and 4,178 pipes simultaneously. The New York Times described the Radio City organ as "like having an orchestra under your fingers and feet ... cymbals that crash, violins that swoon, tubas that oompah, xylophones that plunk and glockenspiels that plink".

Leibert had his own radio program on the NBC Radio Network in the 1930s and 1940s, playing a smaller Wurlitzer organ in a broadcasting studio at the Music Hall for 16 programs weekly. In addition to his busy schedule of Radio City Music Hall performances and broadcasts, Leibert played at Manhattan nightclubs in the 1930s following the end of Prohibition. He also patented 32 "gadgets" for the pipe organ, newspapers reported in 1934.

Leibert did annual concert tours, playing with such orchestra leaders of the period as Paul Whiteman, Charles Previn, Raymond Paige, and Erno Rappe. His musicianship appealed to listeners who were not necessarily organ music fans. One critic enthused, "He has transformed this reviewer from one who despised the pipe organ to a Dick Leibert fan. His music isn't crashing noise — it's music, always making us want more and sending the audience away humming". The year before he retired as Radio City Music Hall's chief organist, he played a special midnight concert, "Bach to Bacharach", on the Mighty Wurlitzer for the convention of the American Theatre Organ Society.

== Discography ==
In 1951, two of Leibert's phonograph records marketed by RCA Victor were Organ Encores and Christmas Carols. His many recordings span the 1940s–1960s and were made on various organs, in addition to Radio City Music Hall, such as the Byrd Theatre in Richmond, Virginia, and the fondly remembered Paramount Theatre on Times Square in Manhattan. Some of his later LP recordings in stereo have been re-mastered and released on compact disc. Leibert's recordings produced by RCA Victor and Westminster Records include:

- The Hymns America Loves Best
- Christmas at Radio City Music Hall with Dick Leibert
- Dick Leibert at the console
- Leibert Takes A Holiday
- Leibert Takes Richmond
- Under the Christmas mistletoe
- The Happy Hits of Christmas
- Wedding Music
- Dick Leibert – At The Radio City Music Hall Organ (plays Highlights From The Sound Of Music, Mary Poppins, My Fair Lady)
- Merry Christmas in New York from Radio City Music Hall
- Richard Leibert: Ferde Grofé Orchestra
- Favorites Of The Radio City Music Hall

== Personal life and death ==
While living in Washington, D.C., in 1926, the 23-year-old Leibert eloped with Mary McClintic, the 19-year-old daughter of U.S. Representative James V. McClintic (D-Oklahoma), marrying at Old St. Paul's Church in Baltimore. The couple had previously eloped four years before, but Rep. McClintic had the marriage annulled due to Mary being underage at the time. They had two children.

After moving to Manhattan to be near Radio City Music Hall in the 1930s, Leibert enjoyed boating on the Hudson River, as well as playing the piano in his Fifth Avenue penthouse apartment. He also enjoyed golf.

Leibert later married the former Rosemarie Bruns (1927–2012), who performed as a Radio City Music Hall Rockette between 1944 and 1947, and they lived in Wilton, Connecticut. They had three children. After his retirement from Radio City Music Hall in 1971, Leibert and his wife lived in Cape Coral, Florida, until his death on October 22, 1976, at age 73.
