= The Blind Christ =

2016 film

- Film poster
- Directed by: Christopher Murray
- Written by: Christopher Murray
- Starring: Michael Silva
- Release date: 2 September 2016 (Venice)
- Running time: 85 minutes
- Country: Chile
- Language: Spanish

The Blind Christ (Spanish: El Cristo ciego) is a 2016 Chilean drama film directed by Christopher Murray and co-produced with France's Ciné-Sud Promotion. It was selected to compete for the Golden Lion at the 73rd Venice International Film Festival.

== Plot ==
Michael is a 30-year-old mechanic who believes he has experienced a divine revelation in the desert and has been bestowed with special powers. However, his village considers him crazy and dismisses his claims. One day, when he learns that a childhood friend has been injured in an accident, Michael sets out on a barefoot pilgrimage through the desert to find and heal him with a miracle.

During his journey, Michael meets vagabonds, hitmen, drug addicts, abandoned women, and people exploited by mining companies. They perceive him as a Christ-like figure who can alleviate their harsh realities. Despite the challenges and obstacles he faces, Michael perseveres, using his faith and abilities to help those he encounters.

== Cast ==
- Michael Silva as Michael
- Bastian Inostroza
- Ana Maria Henriquez
- Mauricio Pinto
- Pedro Godoy

== Production ==
The film was shot in Pampa del Tamarugal, the Tarapacá Region of northern Chile. Its desert geography is dominated by saltpeter works. The film has little dialogue and features Michael Silva as the only professional actor. The rest of the characters are played by local residents who told their personal stories.
