= The Bad Batch (film) =

2016 American dystopian thriller film

- Theatrical release poster
- Directed by: Ana Lily Amirpour
- Written by: Ana Lily Amirpour
- Produced by: Danny Gabai; Sina Sayyah
- Starring: Suki Waterhouse; Jason Momoa; Giovanni Ribisi; Keanu Reeves
- Cinematography: Lyle Vincent
- Edited by: Alex O'Flinn
- Production companies: Annapurna Pictures; VICE Media; Human Stew Factory
- Distributed by: Neon
- Release dates: September 6, 2016 (Venice); June 23, 2017 (United States)
- Running time: 118 minutes
- Country: United States
- Language: English
- Budget: $6 million
- Box office: $201,890

The Bad Batch is a 2016 American dystopian thriller film directed and written by Ana Lily Amirpour. The film is about a young woman (Suki Waterhouse) exiled to a desert where she is attacked by a group of cannibals, led by a person called Miami Man (Jason Momoa), and barely escaping alive to a bizarre settlement run by a charismatic leader (Keanu Reeves). Giovanni Ribisi also stars.

The Bad Batch was selected to compete for the Golden Lion at the 73rd Venice International Film Festival, where it won the Special Jury Prize. It received a limited release in theaters by Neon on June 23, 2017, in addition to streaming on Netflix.

== Plot ==
A young woman named Arlen is exiled to a desert outside Texas, where people deemed undesirable by the government (the "bad batch") are forced to fend for themselves. A sign declares the area outside of the US and that American laws and citizenship no longer apply. Arlen is soon kidnapped by two women in a golf cart. When she wakes chained up, a woman cuts off her right arm and leg. Arlen tricks the woman into unchaining her, kills her, observes cannibalism of human limbs, and escapes crawling on a skateboard. She is rescued in the desert by a mute hermit, who takes her to a makeshift settlement named Comfort that has all-night raves.

Five months later, Arlen has a prosthetic leg and a home in Comfort. She walks out to the desert with a pistol. Investigating a golf cart similar to the one used by the cannibals, she finds a woman and little girl scavenging in a garbage dump. Accusing the woman of being part of the cannibal community, Arlen shoots her in the head. She is observed by the hermit as she takes the girl, Honey, back to Comfort. Miami Man, a leader of the cannibals and the father of Honey, goes looking for her, finding the dead woman, and then the hermit. The hermit, in exchange for a hand-sketched portrait, advises Miami Man to "find Comfort".

In Comfort, Arlen takes a hallucinogen at a rave held by The Dream, the cult-like leader of Comfort, and loses track of the child, who is taken in by The Dream. Hallucinating, Arlen wanders out into the desert, where Miami Man finds her. Upon threat of death, he demands that she find his daughter in Comfort.

Arlen and Miami Man grow closer on their journey to Comfort. He kills another cannibal who is looking to trade gasoline for her flesh and reveals that he was put into the lawless territory because he was an illegal immigrant from Cuba. However, another man shoots Miami Man in the chest, and Arlen somewhat reluctantly returns to Comfort. She searches for Honey, eventually discovering she is living in The Dream's mansion, along with his large harem of pregnant young women.

Arlen visits The Dream, who explains that Comfort's economy is run on the drugs his concubines make, and that Comfort is free of feces because of the plumbing he provides. Arlen agrees to join his harem but uses a pistol she has hidden inside her prosthetic to hold one of the pregnant concubines hostage. After extracting the girl, they head out of Comfort in a golf cart and reunite with Miami Man, who had been found and healed by the hermit.

The child and Miami Man blissfully reunite, and Arlen implies she would rather stay with him in the desert than live in Comfort. Miami Man tries to discourage her, deeming her unable to survive out in the harsh desert, but does not send her away. Honey asks for spaghetti, as she had grown accustomed to good things in the mansion. Instead, Miami Man takes his daughter's pet rabbit, and later the three of them lounge by a fire eating it. Miami Man rubs his teary daughter's back, and then he and Arlen look into each other's eyes, smiling.

== Cast ==
- Suki Waterhouse as Arlen
- Jason Momoa as Miami Man
- Keanu Reeves as The Dream
- Giovanni Ribisi as The Screamer
- Jim Carrey as The Hermit
- Diego Luna as Jimmy (uncredited)
- Jayda Fink as Honey
- Yolonda Ross as Maria
- Cory Roberts as the Big Black Bridge Man

== Production ==
In January 2015, Ana Lily Amirpour was announced to be directing the film, while Megan Ellison would produce under her Annapurna Pictures banner, and Danny Gabai and Sina Sayyah would produce under their Vice Films banner. In March 2015, Keanu Reeves, Jim Carrey, Jason Momoa, Suki Waterhouse, and Diego Luna joined the film, though Luna's work would eventually be limited to an uncredited cameo in the finished product. The film was produced on a $6 million budget.

=== Filming ===
Principal photography on the film began on April 8, 2015, in Los Angeles. Film was also shot in Niland and Bombay Beach, California.

== Release ==
The film had its world premiere at the Venice Film Festival on September 6, 2016. Shortly after, Netflix and Screen Media Films acquired SVOD and theatrical distribution rights to the film, respectively. However, Neon later acquired distribution rights to the film. The film also screened at the Toronto International Film Festival on September 8, 2016. Neon gave it a limited release on June 23, 2017, earning a box office of $201,890. In addition to its limited theatrical release, and streaming on Netflix, sales on Digital HD from Amazon Video and iTunes commenced on June 22, 2017. The film's DVD and Blu-ray were released on September 19, 2017.

== Critical reception ==
On the review aggregator website Rotten Tomatoes, 45% of 100 critics' reviews are positive, with an average rating of 5.8/10. The website's consensus reads: "The Bad Batch has its moments, but it's too thinly written and self-indulgent to justify its length or compensate for its slow narrative drift." Metacritic, which uses a weighted average, assigned the film a score of 62 out of 100, based on 25 critics, indicating "generally favorable" reviews.

Guy Lodge of Variety wrote that "though there's much to savor in the pic's lavishly distressed visuals and soundscape, its narrative feels increasingly stretched and desultory." Lee Marshall of Screen International wrote that "the story runs out of steam – with a full ninety minutes still to go." David Rooney of The Hollywood Reporter wrote that "the movie is overlong and not without draggy patches, but it's sustained enough to keep you watching."

== Awards ==
It was selected to compete for the Golden Lion at the 73rd Venice International Film Festival, where it won the Special Jury Prize.
