= Byrd Theatre =

Historic theater in Richmond, Virginia, US

- U.S. National Register of Historic Places
- Virginia Landmarks Register
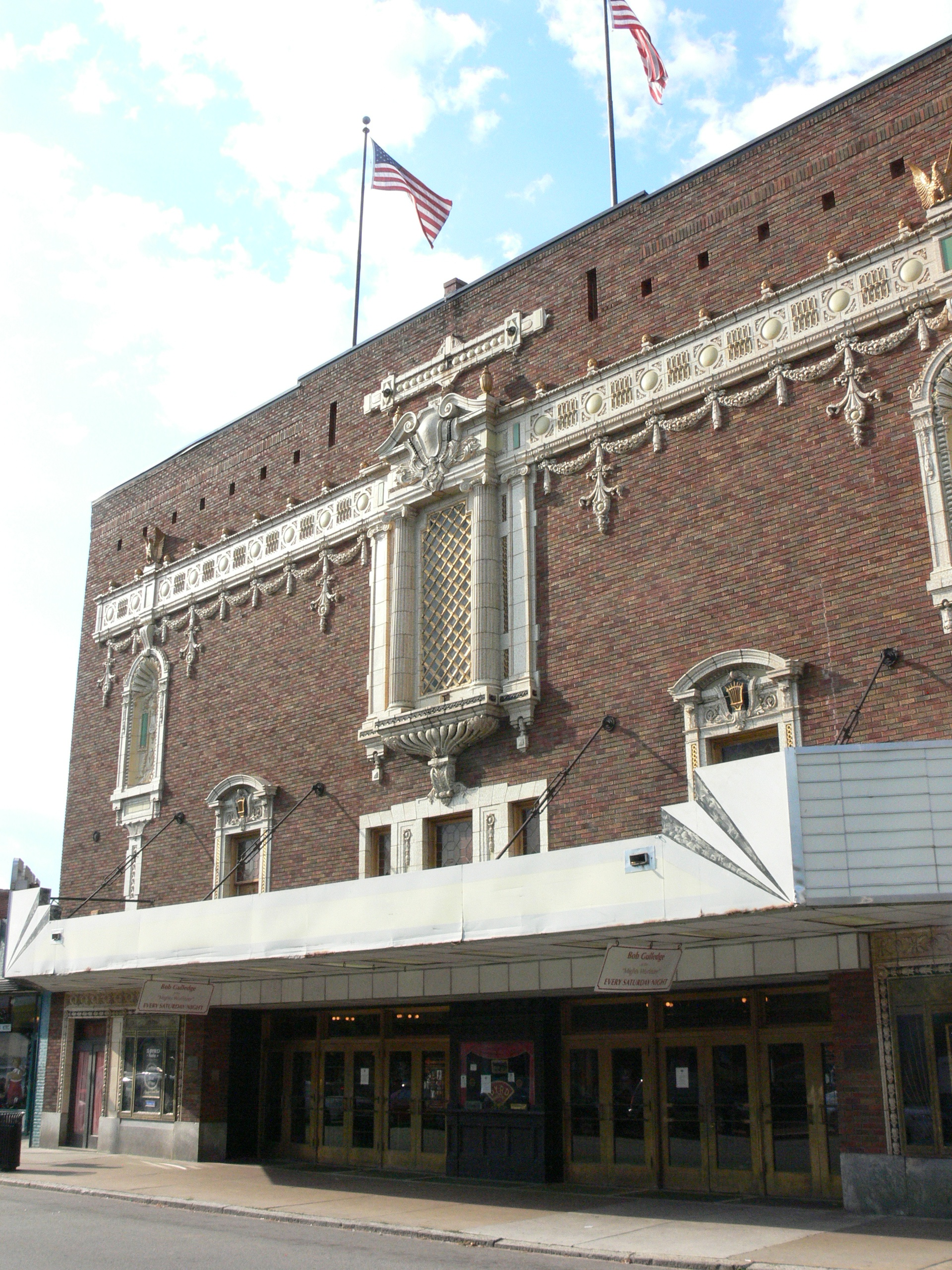

- Location within Virginia Location within the United States
- Location: 2908 W. Cary St., Richmond, Virginia
- Coordinates: 37°33′9″N 77°28′41″W
- Area: less than one acre
- Built: 1928
- Architect: Fred Bishop
- Architectural style: French Empire Period
- NRHP reference No.: 79003289
- VLR No.: 127-0287

Significant dates
- Added to NRHP: September 24, 1979
- Designated VLR: June 21, 1977

The Byrd Theatre is a cinema in the Carytown neighborhood of Richmond, Virginia. It was named after William Byrd II, the founder of the city. The theater opened on December 24, 1928 to much excitement and is affectionately referred to as "Richmond’s Movie Palace". Though equipped with a Wurlitzer pipe organ, the theatre was also one of the first of its kind to be originally outfitted for sound motion pictures.

== History ==
Built in 1928, the theater cost $900,000 (inflation adjusted equivalent $12,430,000 in 2014) to construct. The builders were Charles Somma and Walter Coulter.

The Byrd Theatre opened for the first time on December 24, 1928. At the time, adult tickets were 50 cents for evening shows and 25 cents for matinees, while a child's ticket was only 10 cents. The first movie was the film Waterfront, a First National film starring Dorothy Mackaill and Jack Mulhall. In addition, the manager at the time was Robert Coulter, who remained the manager until his retirement in 1971, and is rumored to haunt the theatre. In 1953, the original 35mm Simplex standards were replaced by newer projectors of the same model.

The Byrd was originally segregated. The balcony was intended to accommodate African-Americans, but instead the theater did not open its doors to blacks until the 1960s. Until then, if a black person came to the theater, he or she would be given admission and cab fare to any of the black theaters in the city.

As of 2023 the theatre plays second-run movies for $8.00 per ticket with the exception of certain festivals such as the Richmond French Film Festival, held annually in March; however, in March of 2023 the theatre announced it would be unable to hold the festival that year, and the festival was discontinued in 2024. In 2007, the Byrd discontinued regular playing of classic movies at midnight shows on Saturday nights due to dwindling attendance.

On March 15, 2024, William Shatner hosted the world premiere of his biographical documentary William Shatner: You Can Call Me Bill at the Byrd.

== Architecture ==
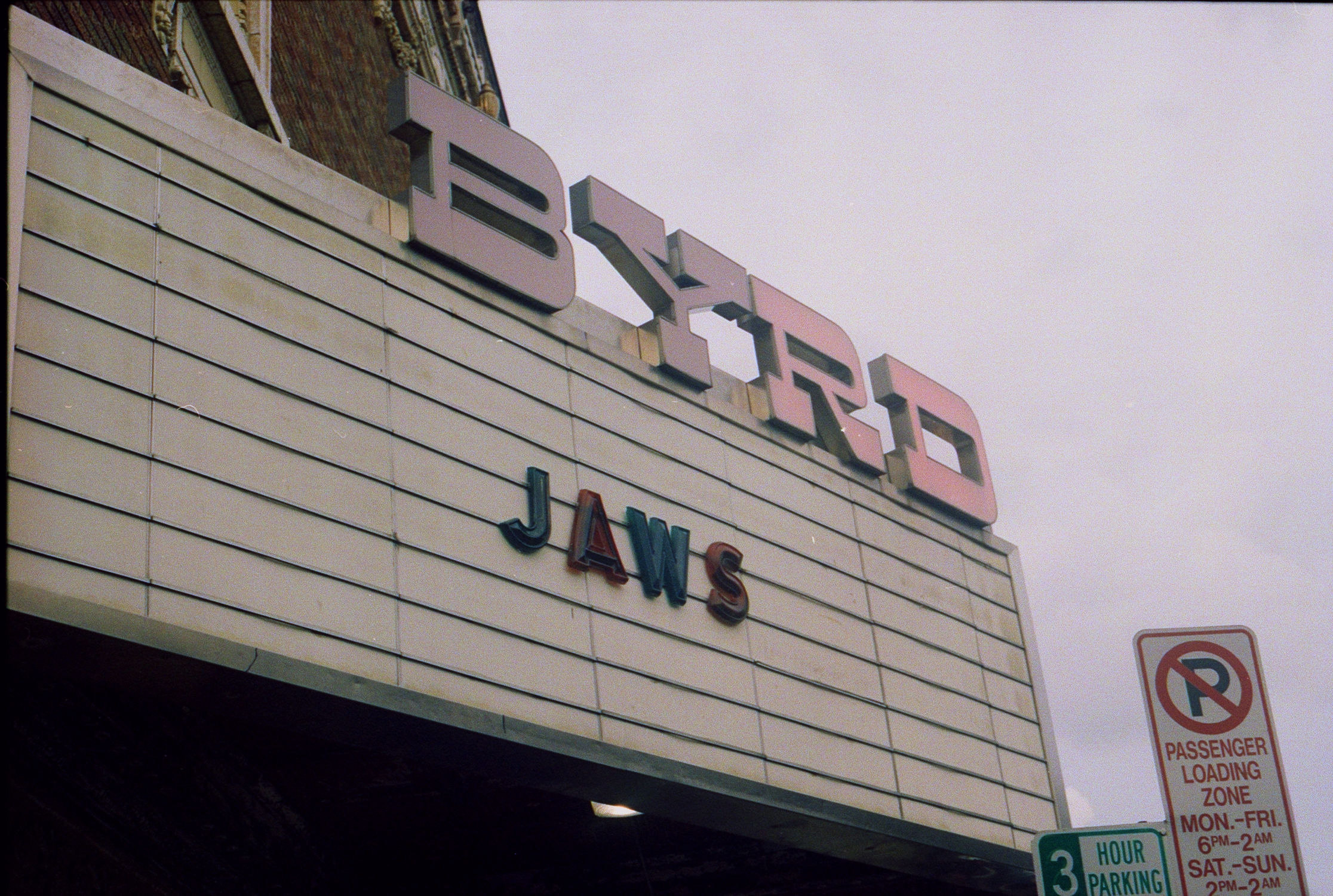
Exterior marquee at the Byrd promoting a Jaws screening

The theatre's architect and contractor was Fred Bishop, and is considered to be of a French Empire style design. Inside, the theatre contains orchestra seating (main) for 916 and balcony seating for 476. The balcony is open whenever attendance requires and occasionally at other times by making a donation to the Byrd Theatre Foundation. The interior features a lavish design by the Arthur Brunet Studios of New York. In addition to eleven Czechoslovak crystal chandeliers, including an 18-foot, two-and-a-half ton chandelier suspended over the auditorium (with over 5,000 crystals illuminated by 500 red, blue, green and amber lights), the interior features imported Italian and Turkish marble, hand-sewn velvet drapes, and oil on canvas murals of Greek mythology. More unusual features included a central vacuum system and a natural spring and pool in the basement which used to supply water to the air conditioning system.

Built during the transition between silent and talking pictures, the designers outfitted the theatre with two sound systems. One of these was Vitaphone, a relatively new sound synchronization system using phonograph records that was commercially developed by Warner Brothers. "The Jazz Singer," generally acknowledged as the first talking film, was recorded using this system. The other original sound system was from Western Electric. Because at the time there was uncertainty whether "talkies" would continue to be popular and a significant number of the films distributed were still silent, the Byrd also included a Wurlitzer Theatre organ.

=== Wurlitzer organ ===
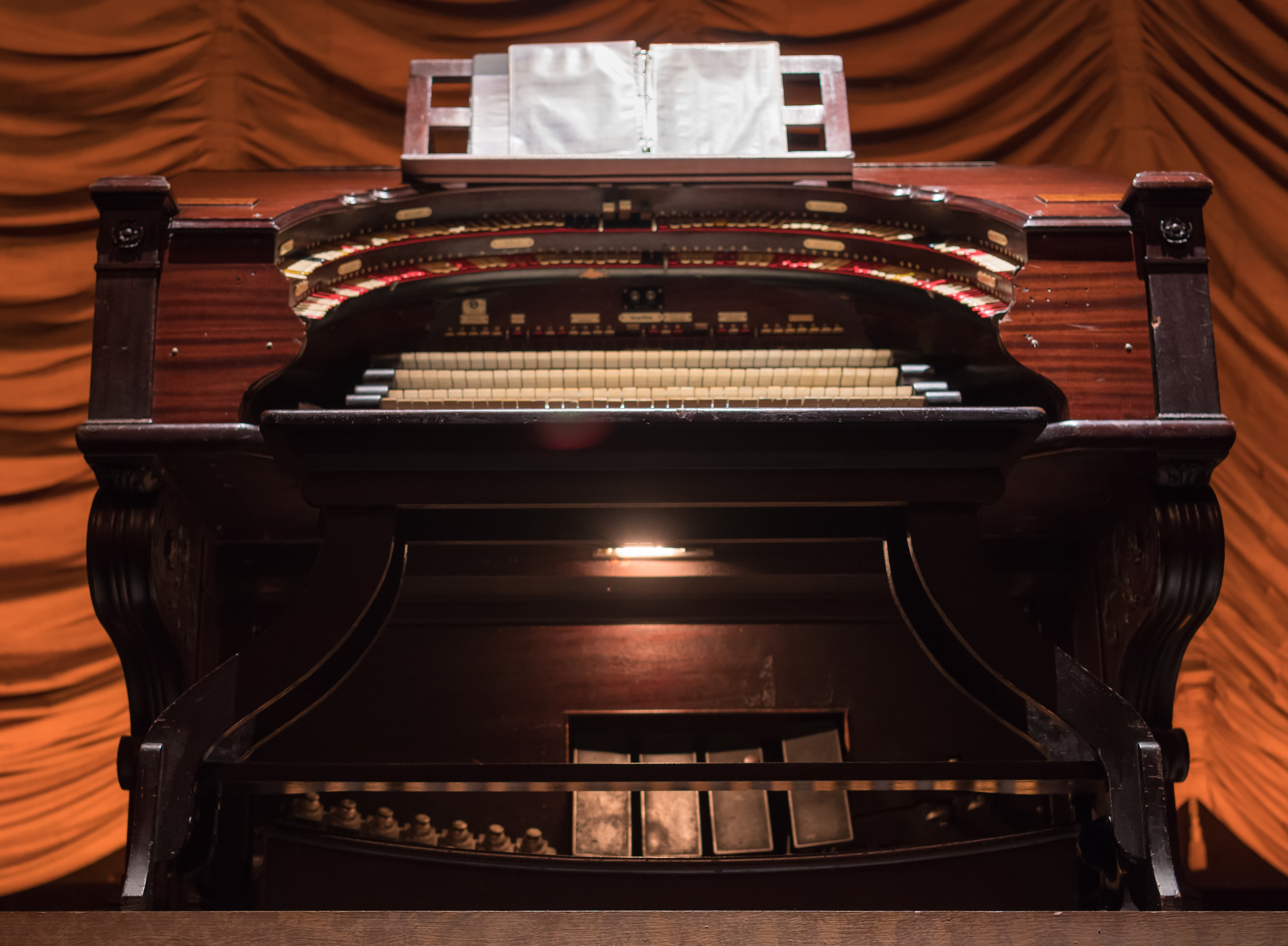
The Byrd Theatre's Wurlitzer organ at stage level.

The Wurlitzer organ of the Byrd Theatre is housed in four rooms on the fourth floor above the stage. The basement also houses a vacuum blower for the piano and an elevator room which raises the organ console to stage level for performances. There is an electrical and pneumatic switching system that aids the organist in choosing which pipes and other devices to use (all of the pipe work, bells, drums, and other effects are acoustic and not electronic). As the sound level of the pipes themselves cannot be changed, the sound levels in the actual auditorium are controlled by large slats called swell shades that open and close to control the volume and a tone chute that carries the sound from the fourth floor.

There is a Lyon and Healy harp which is purely ornamental and does not play, along with a marimba that does play from the organ console in the right box. In the left box there is a Wurlitzer grand piano which can be played from the organ console or its own keyboard and a 37-note xylophone that plays from the console.

House organists have been Carl Rhond, Wilma Beck, Waldo S. Newberry, Slim Mathis, Bill Dalton, Harold Warner, Eddie Weaver, Art Brown, James Hughes, Lin Lunde, and Bob Lent. In the 1950s, Dick Leibert made recordings playing the organ. The Wurlitzer is still played Saturday nights by current house organist Bob Gulledge.

== Preservation ==
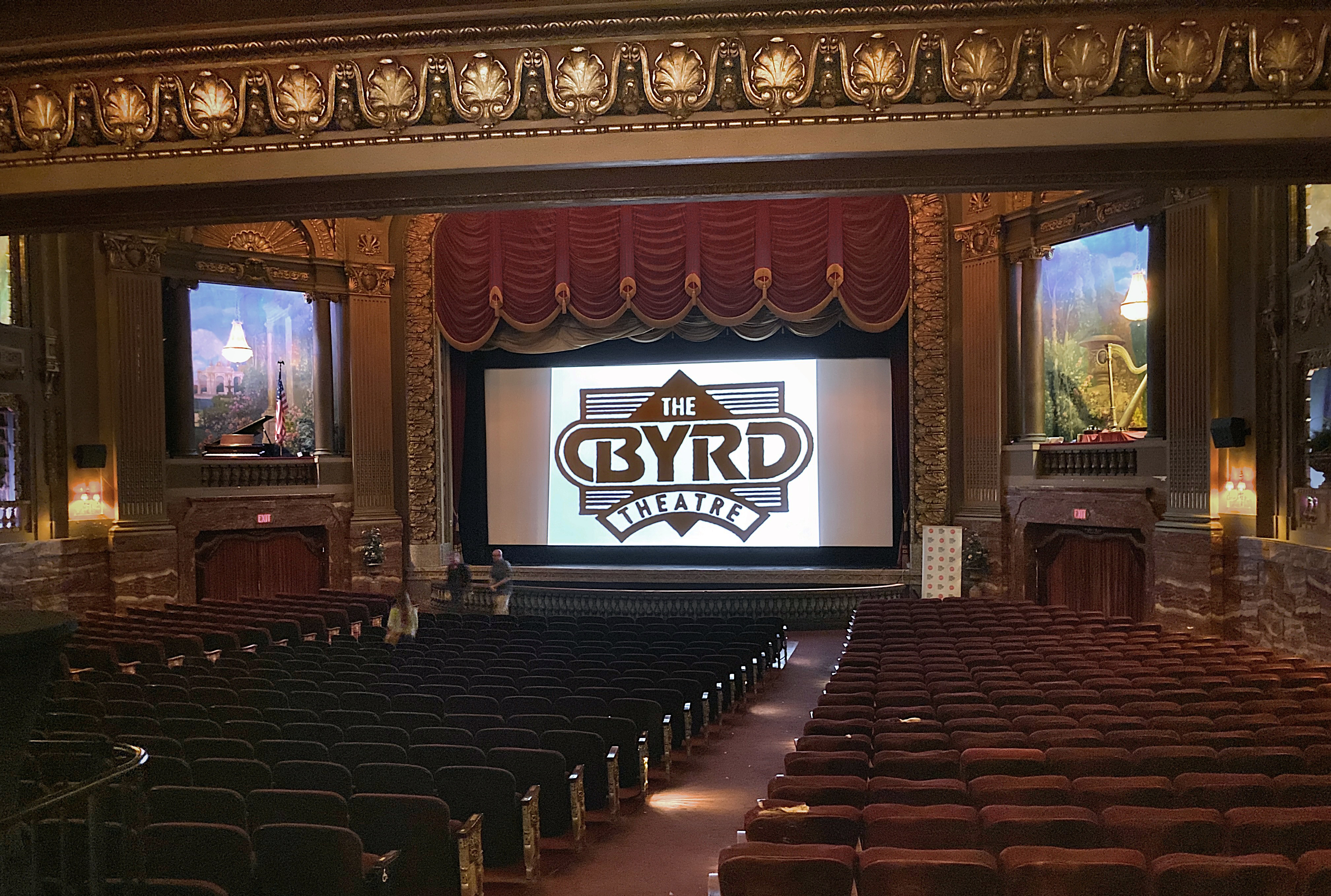
The interior of the Byrd Theatre, a 1928 movie palace in Richmond, Virginia, shown in 2021.

As a result of its longevity, the Byrd Theatre was designated as a Virginia Historic Landmark in 1978, followed in 1979 by listing on the National Register of Historic Places. In 2007, the Byrd Theatre Foundation, a non-profit 501(c)(3) corporation, entered into a purchase agreement for the Byrd with the intent of restoring and preserving the theatre.

From 2007 to 2014, the Byrd Theatre Foundation raised more than $1 million for replacing the roof, renovating the heating and cooling units, and investing in digital projection. In 2017 the center section of seats on the main floor were removed and replaced with 236 new seats and an ADA platform. The new rows of seats are further apart than the originals offering much needed leg room. The remaining seat frames are still original, and though some are torn, most of the upstairs patterned mohair-covered upholstery is still original. In 2006 a Dolby Digital sound system was installed, having been personally donated by the system's creator Ray Dolby after touring the theatre two years prior.

In 2010, a thief stole the "Byrd Cage" donation box, probably netting less than $100 but causing about $1,200 worth of damage to the front doors. Media coverage following the event, however, inspired Richmonders to donate much needed money for the landmark.

== In popular culture ==
Richmond-born musician Lucy Dacus filmed the music video for her song "Hot and Heavy" at the Byrd Theatre and shot the cover art for her third album Home Video at the Theatre as well.
