= Gastón Solnicki =

Argentine film director (born December 1978)

- Born: 1978 (age 47–48); Buenos Aires
- Occupation: Film director
- Years active: 2007–

Gastón Solnicki (born 1978) is an Argentine film director. Coming from an immigrant Jewish family, he studied photography at International Center of Photography, as well as film directing at Tisch School of the Arts in New York.

His first short was Liliana.Rebecca (2007), a short film made with only two actors. He later made the documentaries Süden (2008) and Papirosen (2011), both of which were critically acclaimed.

His breakthrough came with Kékszakállú (2016), his first narrative feature, which depicted the coming-of-age tale of a circle of adolescent girls in Buenos Aires. The film was screened in the Orizzonti section at the 73rd Venice International Film Festival, yet did not win any awards. It was later shown at festivals in Rotterdam, New York, Vancouver and Thessaloniki.

Solnicki's film The Souffleur, starring Willem Dafoe, was released in 2025.
