= Spira Mirabilis (film) =

2016 film

- Film poster
- Directed by: Massimo D'Anolfi; Martina Parenti
- Release dates: 4 September 2016 (Venice); 22 September 2016 (Italy)
- Running time: 121 minutes
- Country: Italy
- Languages: Italian; Lakota

Spira Mirabilis is a 2016 Italian documentary film directed by Massimo D'Anolfi and Martina Parenti. It was selected to compete for the Golden Lion at the 73rd Venice International Film Festival.
