= Libera Nos (film) =

- Directed by: Federica Di Giacomo
- Written by: Federica Di Giacomo
- Release date: September 7, 2016 (Venice Film Festival)
- Countries: Italy; France
- Language: Italian

Libera Nos (Italian: Liberami) is a 2016 Italian-French documentary film written and directed by Federica Di Giacomo. It won the Horizons competition at the 73rd edition of the Venice Film Festival. It depicts exorcisms of Sicilian Franciscan Father Cataldo Migliazzo.
