= Keywan Karimi =

Iranian independent filmmaker of Kurdish descent

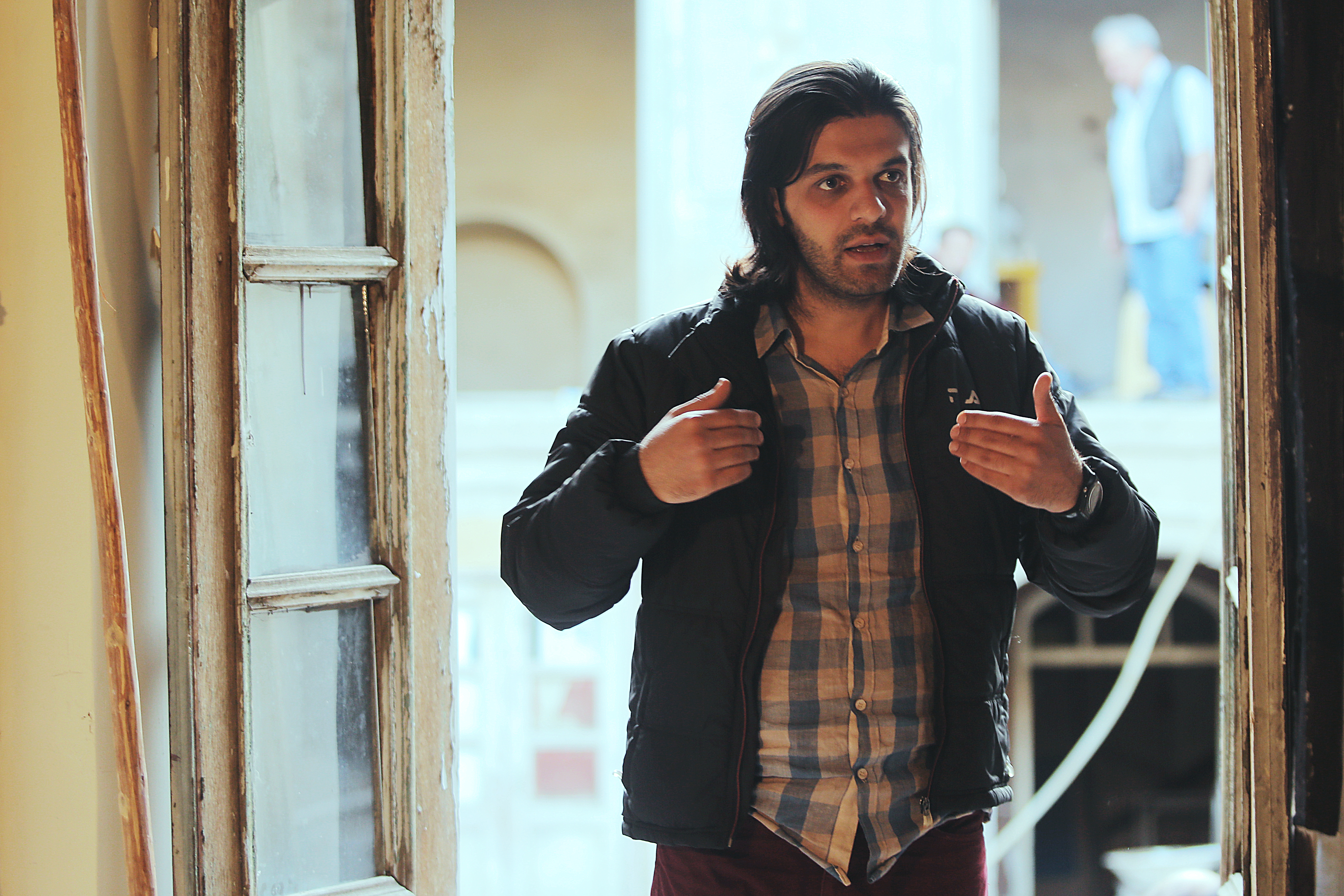
- Born: کیوان کریمی; 1985 (age 40–41); Baneh, Kurdistan, Iran
- Education: Faculty of Social Sciences, University of Tehran
- Occupation: Film Director
- Years active: 2003 – present

Keywan Karimi (Persian: کیوان کریمی ; born 21 September 1985) is an Iranian independent filmmaker of Kurdish descent. He graduated in communication studies from the University of Tehran. Karimi began his work with a series of short documentary films that critiqued life in contemporary Iran. He was sentenced to six years in prison and 223 lashes because of the content of his films. He was released from prison in 2017.

Karimi later moved to Paris for three years where he worked on his new film project OMID during a residency program in Cité internationale des arts invited by Institut Français. He moved to Sweden for another two years residency by Malmö Municipality. He is working on his photo archive book about Kurdistan.

== Style ==
Karimi's film-making style is part inspired by the Situationist International movement, as well as Guy Debord and Raoul Vaneigem. His films examine and critique the roots of radical life in society.

== Filmography ==
- "Broken Border" is a documentary film about smuggling petrol at Iranian Kurdistan borders with Iraq. It won the special Juries Award in Tolfa Mostremp and Leiden Film Festival. It received the Best Documentary Film Award in Filofest Slovenia, FIC Vagón Mexico, and received the Silver Aleph at the 13th Beirut film festival.
- "The Adventure of Married Couples" has participated in more than 40 film festivals such as the San Sebastian, Zurich, and Fribourg International Film Festival. It won several prizes, including an award at the 18th Festival La Fila de Cortometrajes and SURrealidades Festival in Colombia. This eleven-minute black and white film without dialogue is a story of the everyday life of a labouring couple based on a story by Italo Calvino.
- "Writing on the City" is a 60-minute documentary film about Graffiti in Tehran. Its production began in 2012 and it was completed in August 2015. The film was shown at several film festivals such as: Punto de vista film festival (Spain), where it won a Special mention prize, Visions du Réel documentary film festival (Switzerland), Buenos Aires International Festival of Independent Cinema (Argentina), Montpellier Film Festival (France). The documentary was also screened in August 2016 at the Filmes do Homem International Documentary Film Festival in Portugal.
- Karimi new film cleared by revolutionary guard when he was in jail, it was in post production and archive photo of "Rashid" project was delete.
- "Drum", Karimi's first fiction film whose production began in the spring of 2016, was premiered at the competition section of the Venice International Film Festival. Drum depicts the story of a lawyer whose life got completely changed after receiving a package. All the events of the film occur in Tehran city in a dreamlike atmosphere with the black and white images. "Drum" was adapted from a book with the same name, written by Ali-Morad Fadaei-Nia.
- "Do you know anything about Omid?" is a feature fiction film whose script Karimi worked on during his prison sentences and whose final draft he finished when in Paris. The project was selected for Cannes Film Festival for the La Fabrique du cinema section. Project was present in CineMart co-production program in International Film Festival Rotterdam.

== Sentence and Lashes ==
The Revolutionary Guard Corps arrested Keywan on December 14, 2013. They also confiscated his hard drives and other material and was taken to Evin Prison where he was interrogated and kept in solitary confinement for two weeks. On December 26, 2013 Keywan was released on $100,000 bail. Between March 2014 and September 2015 Keywan made eight court appearances to fight his case. Regardless of any of the evidence he provided, on October 13, 2015 he was sentenced by the Islamic Revolutionary Court to six years imprisonment and 223 lashings for “propagating against the ruling system” and “insulting religious sanctities, Accused of insulting the regime after a music clip and documentary film. "Writing on the City" Is a 60 minutes documentary film which employs the unusual and unique angle of focusing on slogans written on the wall and Graffiti in Tehran city.

=== National and International response to the prison and flogging ===
- On 30 October 2015, a group of well-known Philosophy, Sociologist and Human Rights activist wrote letter with subject “Poetry, a crime against the state”.
- On 19 October 2015 Le Conseil d’Administration de L’ARP, 24 October Associazioni autoriali del settore audiovisivo (100autori), 29 October Sindacato Nazionale Giornalisti Cinematografici Italiani (SNGCI) publish different letter in defense keywan karimi.
- On 21 October 2015, Columbia University professor Hamid Dabashi wrote an article that was about Writing on the City film and his travel to Russia where he met Karimi. Dabashi compared Stalinist vulgarities with Iran current situation.
- On 3 November 2015, 45 European Parliament Member (MEPs) various political groups sign petition in support of karimi.
- On 12 November Iran Human Rights and 100 Autori cinema association organized press conference in Casa del Cinema for discuss about Karimi and support him by sending a letter to Italian Prime Minister. Mohsen Makhmalbaf, Daniele Vicari, Greta Scarano, Jose Luis Rebordinos and Claudia Gerini sent video message to the press conference.
- On 19 November 2015 San Sebastian Film Festival make protest by statement and Petition for calculate signature from people around world.
- On 6 December 2015 more than 130 Iranian documentary filmmaker wrote letter to To Head of the Iranian Judiciary Mr.Sadeq Larijani.
- On 15 October Iranian Writers Association and Iran's Pen protest keywan Sentence.
- On 22 December 2015 Pen International ask the Iranian authorities to cancel Keywan Karimi prison and flogging. They calls all member and Pen branch to send appeals for Iranian Government. in 11 January letter of writer and filmmaker published in Pen official website.
- On 9 December 2015 Punto de Vista International Documentary Film Festival decide to make 223 words film that it is response of film-makers from all around the world in defence of his situation. Director like Agnès Varda, Andrés Duque, James Benning, Montxo Armendáriz, Victor Kossakovsky, Lynne Sachs, Alan Berliner, Patricio Guzmán, Eugenio Polgovsky, Fernando Arrabal, Lynne Sachs, Basilio Martín Patino participated in film.
- On 7 January 2016 more than 668 filmmak from different country signature a letter to Head of the Iranian Judiciary Mr. Larijani ask him to act immediately in the exercise of him duties so that this punishment is cancelled and Keywan Karimi can travel without fear and continue his work. this letter signature by Abderrahmane Sissako, Claude Lanzmann, Dominik Moll, Jean-Jacques Beineix, Nicolas Philibert, Julie Bertucelli, Michel Ocelot, Pascale Ferran, Catherine Corsini, Claire Denis, Antonin Peretjatko, Danny Degrave.
- On 22 January 2016 Amnesty International start a campaign and petition in defense of Keywan Karimi.
- In March 2016, 3 Oscar-Winning directors, Bernardo Bertolucci, Roberto Benigni and Nicola Piovani supported him by signing a letter.
- On 27 March 2016, an event was holding in Tokyo named "Freedom of Speech" by the Japanese activists. 2 of the Karimi's short films (The Adventure of Married Couples and Broken Border) were screened at this event. Noam Chomsky also sent a message to this event for Keywan Karimi. He has told: "Very pleased to learn about the event featuring the courageous Iranian filmmaker Keywan Karimi, and protesting his disgraceful and criminal treatment on the part of the state authorities."
- On the eve of the 69th Cannes Film Festival, (4 May 2016) the documentary section of the Festival jury called attention to the fate of Karimi. In their declaration they have asked for the "International efforts must continue to have his sentence overturned". the statement also said: "The L’OEil d’Or jury has drawn attention to the fate of Iranian filmmaker, Keywan Karimi, sentenced by an Appeal Court in February 2016 to one year’s imprisonment, 223 lashes and a fine of 20 million rials for his recent documentary film, Writing on the City, about the graffiti and messages written on the walls of Teheran from the 1979 revolution to the 2009 political movement. He is accused of “insulting sanctities” for a love scene that he denies filming and “propaganda” against the government. International efforts must continue to have his sentence overturned and demand the lifting of all sanctions and freedom for artistic creation worldwide."
- On 7 May 2016, WAM Festival Mozart in Italy in cooperation with Amnesty showed their solidarity with Karimi and protested against his sentence, by playing the Dimitri Ashkenazy and the Endellion String Quartet.
- On 27 May 2016, The University of Valencia with the participation of Amnesty in Spain screened the documentary Writing on the City to show their support and solidarity with Keywan Karimi.
- On 13 May 2016, more than 30 major European film organizations like The Academy of Italian Cinema, L'ARP, Venice Biennial, Cannes Festival,100autori.etc, appealed to the Iranian government to grant clemency to Karimi. They also have said: "It is completely unacceptable that through the simple act of expressing his artistic and critical outlook, Karimi should be on the list of artists, journalists and private citizens whose freedom – if not their life itself – has been taken by the Iranian authorities."
- A graffiti page named "Writing on the City - Writing for Keywan. Un graffito per Keywan Karimi" was started in Italy after Karimi was sentenced to imprisonment and flogging. They called the members of the page to draw graffiti for supporting Karimi.
- French filmmakers support.
- German filmmakers support.

=== Video messages ===
- José Luis Rebordinos, The artistic director of the International Film Festival of San Sebastian in Spain
- Daniele Vicari, Italian director, screenwriter and producer
- Claudia Gerini, Italian actress
- Greta Scarano, Italian actress

=== Appeals Court ===
He has been informed by the Appeals Court that five years of his six-year sentence have been suspended, but that he has to serve the one remaining year in jail, plus undergo 223 lashes and pay a fine of 20 million rials. The ruling is final and cannot be appealed.
