= VCU French Film Festival =

- Location: Richmond, Virginia
- Founded: 1993
- Hosted by: Virginia Commonwealth University, University of Richmond
- No. of films: 17 features & 13 shorts (2015)
- Festival date: March (annually)
- Language: French
- Website: http://www.frenchfilmfestival.us/

The French Film Festival - Richmond, VA was an annual film festival held in Richmond, Virginia, focused on recently produced French-language films.

It was created in 1993 by Drs. Peter and Françoise Kirkpatrick, professors of French literature, culture and film studies at Virginia Commonwealth University and University of Richmond, respectively. It is billed as the largest festival of French film in the United States. Since then, and as of 2015, it has welcomed a delegation totaling more than 380 directors, producers, actors, film scholars, critics, and French government officials. At the 2004 Festival, the Festival's founders and directors, Drs. Peter and Françoise Ravaux-Kirkpatrick, were decorated as "Chevaliers de l'Ordre des Arts et des Lettres", a high honor in the arts in France, and in 2011, the Médaille Beaumarchais by the French Société des Auteurs et Compositeurs Dramatiques.

The festival usually takes place the last weekend of March, during which the city is filled with French speakers and aficionados of French cinema. It is held at the historic Byrd Theatre. At the 2014 Festival, there were approximately 22,000 attendees/tickets sold.

According to Richmond.com, in 2024 the newly retired and emeriti founders of the festival "said it was the right time for the beloved festival to end."

== Festival ==
The festival is host to a variety of French films, both short and feature-length. to promote French language, cinema, and culture in the U.S. and in American educational institutions. French directors and starring actors engage the audience in question and answer sessions following the screening of their films.

The Festival is sponsored by the French Ministry of Foreign Affairs, Unifrance, l'ARP (French acronym for "Guild of French Directors and Producers"), and the SACD (a French acronym for "Guild of Authors, Composers and Directors"). The Community Idea Stations (PBS), as well as the TV channel TV5Monde also are partners of the festival.

The Byrd Theatre, rated by USA Today in 2011 as one of the best film palaces remaining in North America, is the annual venue for the Festival. Each year, the French Film Festival brings to the Byrd Theatre the very same technicians and projectionists responsible for the screenings at the International Cannes Film Festival, ensuring the highest quality of both sounds and images

== Programme ==
Each year, the festival showcases a selection of features, shorts and masterclasses in various sections:

- Feature and Short Selections – The main attraction of the festival
  - Feature Films Selection– A selection of around 15 US and world premieres of recently produced French features (fictions and documentaries) all presented by their directors, screenwriters or starring actors and screened at the Byrd Theatre.
  - Classics – A selection of a few award-winning restored French classics, also introduced by their director, cast or technicians.
  - Special Screenings – exclusive screenings of newly found and restored French silent films by the likes of Georges Méliès or the Lumière Brothers, lent to the Festival by the French Cinémathèque.
  - Short Films Selection – A selection of around 15 French short films screened at the Byrd Theatre and introduced by their directors and/or main actors.
- Master Classes – Each year, the festival organizes several master-classes with distinguished guests from its French delegation, each centered around one central theme as well as the guests's career. All master classes are free and open to the public and either take place at the University of Richmond or at the Byrd Theatre.

== Delegation ==
A large delegation of French directors, actors and producers of feature and short films come to the Festival each year to present their films and also interact with the audience through question-and-answer sessions after each showing.
