= Stadtpark station =

Vienna U-Bahn station

Stadtpark
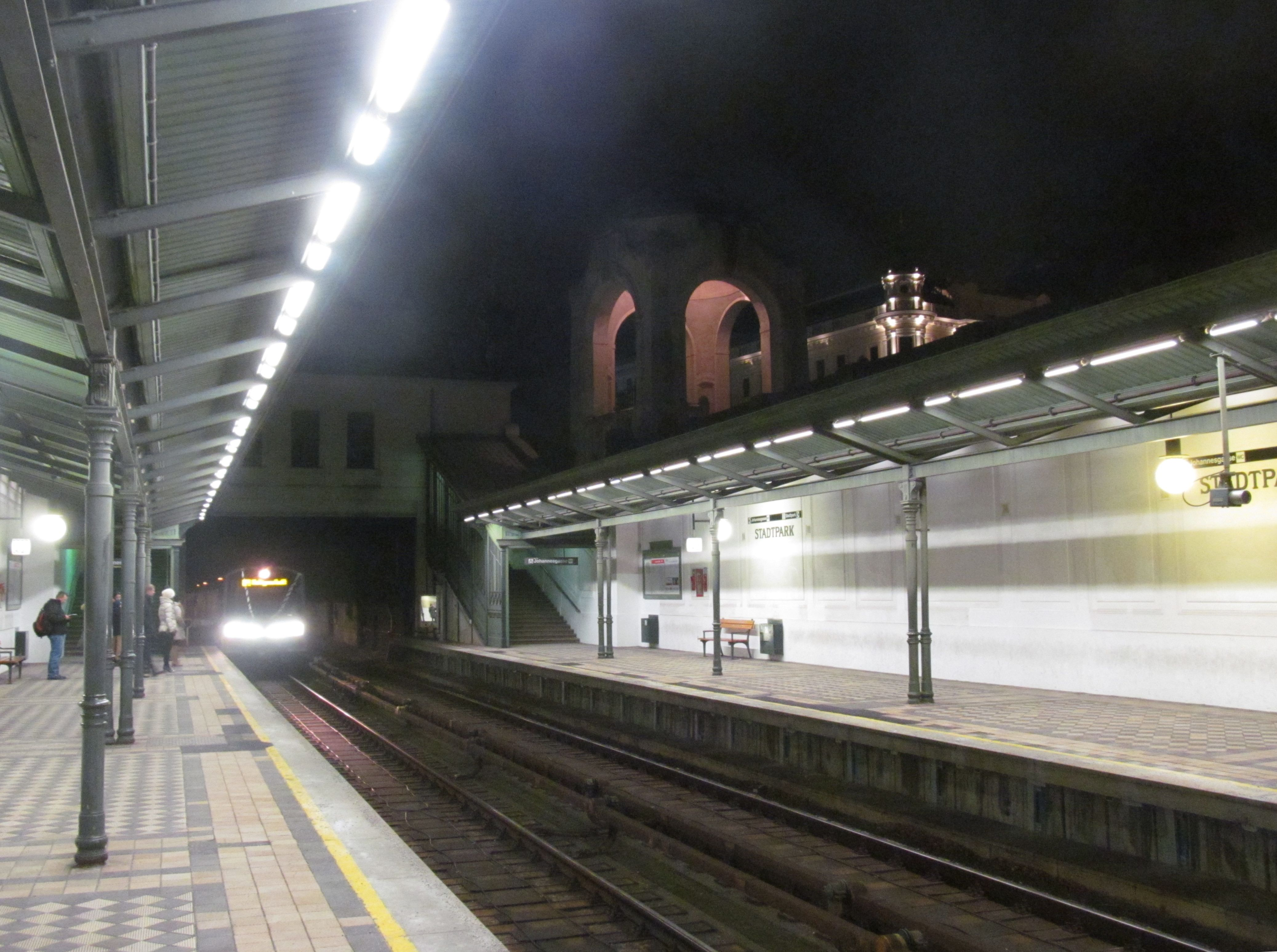
- Nighttime view from the platforms

General information
- Location: Landstraße, Vienna; Austria
- Coordinates: 48.2027°N 16.3794°E

History
- Opened: 1978

Services
Preceding station	Wiener Linien	Following station
Karlsplatz toward Hütteldorf	U4	Landstraße toward Heiligenstadt
Location

Stadtpark is a station on U4 of the Vienna U-Bahn. It is located in the Landstraße District. It opened in 1978. It is one of the few Otto Wagner buildings on the U4 that has been preserved almost in its original condition. The station, which is open-air and has two side platforms, is located in a cutting and lies parallel to the Wien Canal. Exits lead via a fixed staircase through a station building into Johannesgasse via a staircase or an elevator directly into the part of the Stadtpark located in the 3rd district. The station building hangs over the portal of the Wienfluss designed by Friedrich Ohmann, an opponent of Otto Wagner. Also in the immediate vicinity of the station are Wiener Konzerthaus, Kursalon Hübner, and the InterContinental Vienna Hotel.

== History ==
The station, designed by Otto Wagner and built on behalf of the Commission for Transport Facilities in Vienna. The station was known as the "Tegetthoff Bridge" during the planning and construction phase and was structurally completed in December 1897. It finally went into operation on June 30, 1899, as part of the Lower Vienna Vallet Line of the Vienna Steam City Railway, which ran from Meidling Hauptstraße Station to Hauptzollamt Station, today Wien Mitte Station. On December 8, 1918, it was closed due to the coal shortage after the First World War and reopened on September 7, 1925, as part of the new Vienna Electric City Railway. The station has been a listed building since 1934.

In 1977 and 1978, the station was adapted for underground operations. The platforms were raised by 45 centimetres and the track was lowered by 15 centimetres, which required a corresponding shift in the wall friezes and platform roofs. The U4 trains served the Stadtpark station for the first time on August 15, 1978. The exit to the Stadtpark was only built later.

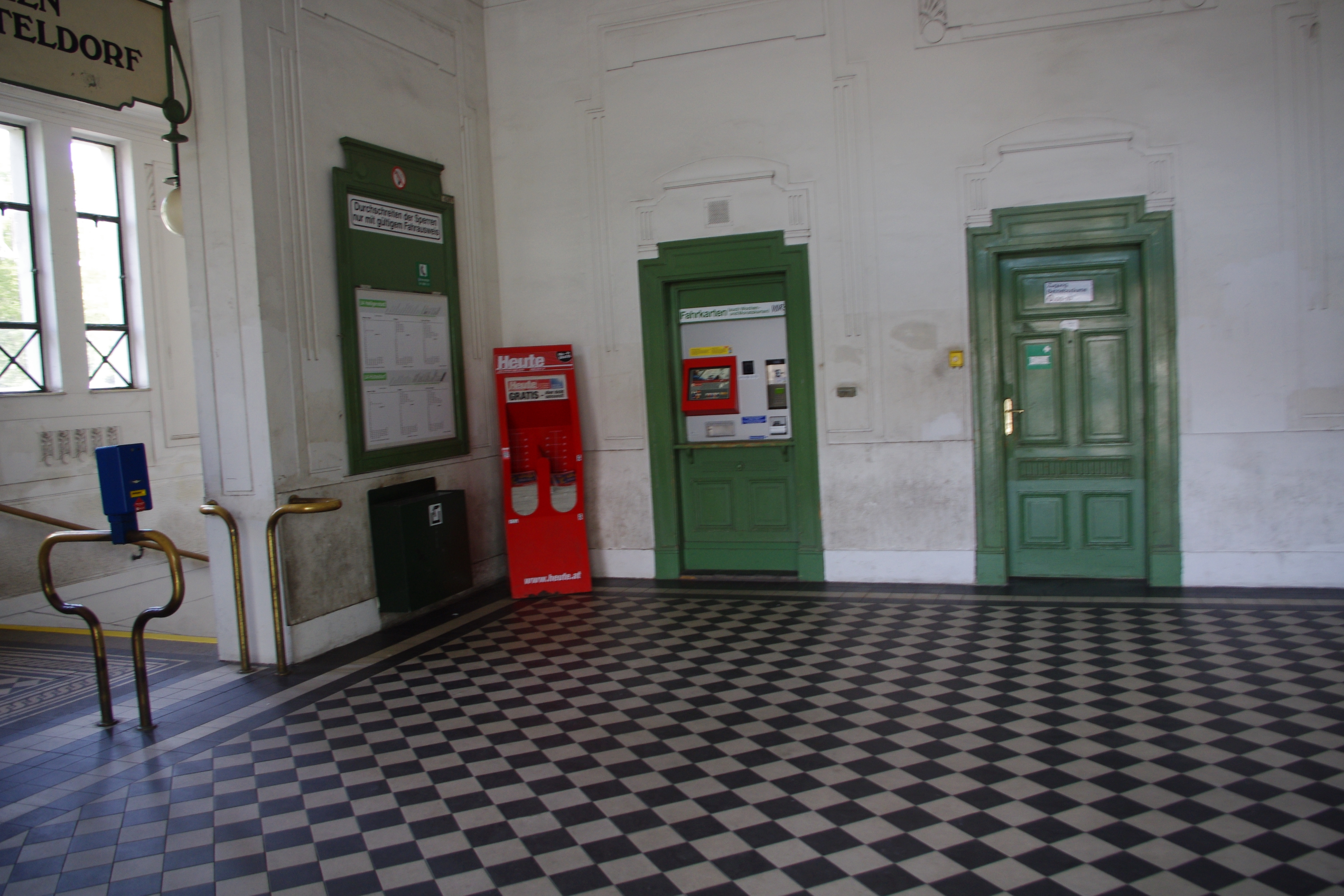
Inside the Station House

The general renovation of the station began on November 30, 2015, and some of the platforms were closed. After completion of the work on the platforms, the station reopened on January 30, 2017.

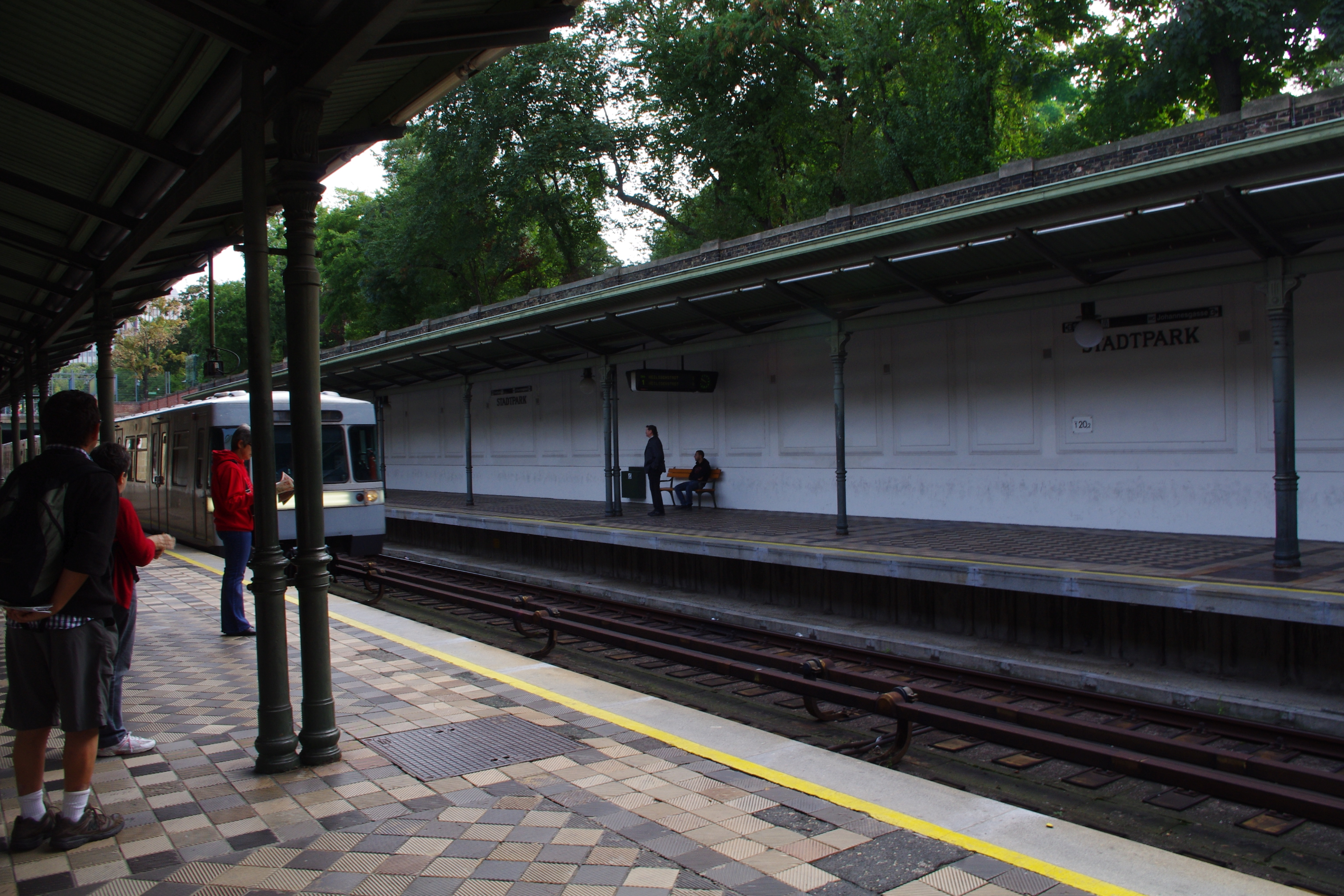
Station at Platform Level
