= You Never Had It: An Evening With Bukowski =

- Directed by: Matteo Borgardt
- Release date: 2020
- Running time: 52 minutes
- Country: United States
- Language: English

You Never Had It: An Evening With Bukowski is a 2020 documentary directed by Matteo Borgardt.
