= L'ARP =

La Société civile des Auteurs Réalisateurs et Producteurs, acronym L'ARP is France's "Guild of Authors, Directors and Producers." It is a Copyright collective that ensures Collective rights management.

L'ARP co-sponsors City of Lights, City of Angels festival in Los Angeles as well as the VCU French Film Festival in Richmond, Virginia.
