= Writing on the City =

- Directed by: Keywan Karimi
- Produced by: Keywan Karimi
- Cinematography: Arasto Madahi Givi
- Edited by: Farahnaz Sharifi
- Music by: Bamdad Afshar
- Release date: February 12, 2016 (Punto de Vista)
- Running time: 60 minutes
- Country: Iran
- Language: Persian

Writing on the City (Persian: نوشتن بر شهر, translit. Neveshtan bar Shahr) is a 60 minutes documentary film about graffiti in Tehran by Iranian Independent filmmaker Keywan Karimi. The Karimi started working on the documentary in 2012 and completed it in August 2015. It has since been edited several times and has been shown in several film festivals.

Karimi arrested in 2013 by Revolutionary Guard Corps and in October 2015 sentenced by the Islamic Revolutionary Court to six years imprisonment and 223 Lashes for "propagating against the Islamic Republic" and "insulting religious sanctities.

== Reception ==
Raoul Vaneigem, who is an active member of the Situationist movement, wrote a piece to express his appreciation about the film.

Giona Nazzaro, General Delegate Venice international film Critics' week, called Karimi a "challenger" and "creative" film-maker. also saying that Writing on the City was one of the best Iranian documentaries of recent years."

The Spanish newspaper, El Mundo also wrote about Writing on the city: "On the screen, a man strives to draw the last traces of an immense face. At the time the camera stops against him, the artist with his face obscured by night outline just strange eyes. Large and open. At that time, it is the viewer who feels observed.The film looks back at the audience."

In an interview with a Spanish newspaper, El Diario a critic said: "Like Agnes Varda in Mur murs or Chris Marker in Chats perchés (over Los Angeles and Paris, respectively), Karimi had realized that graffiti make up a sort of subconscious of a city. That was the territory Karimi wanted to understand and analyze, but the government of his country, which does not like riddles, wants to punish his curiosity."

== Film screening ==
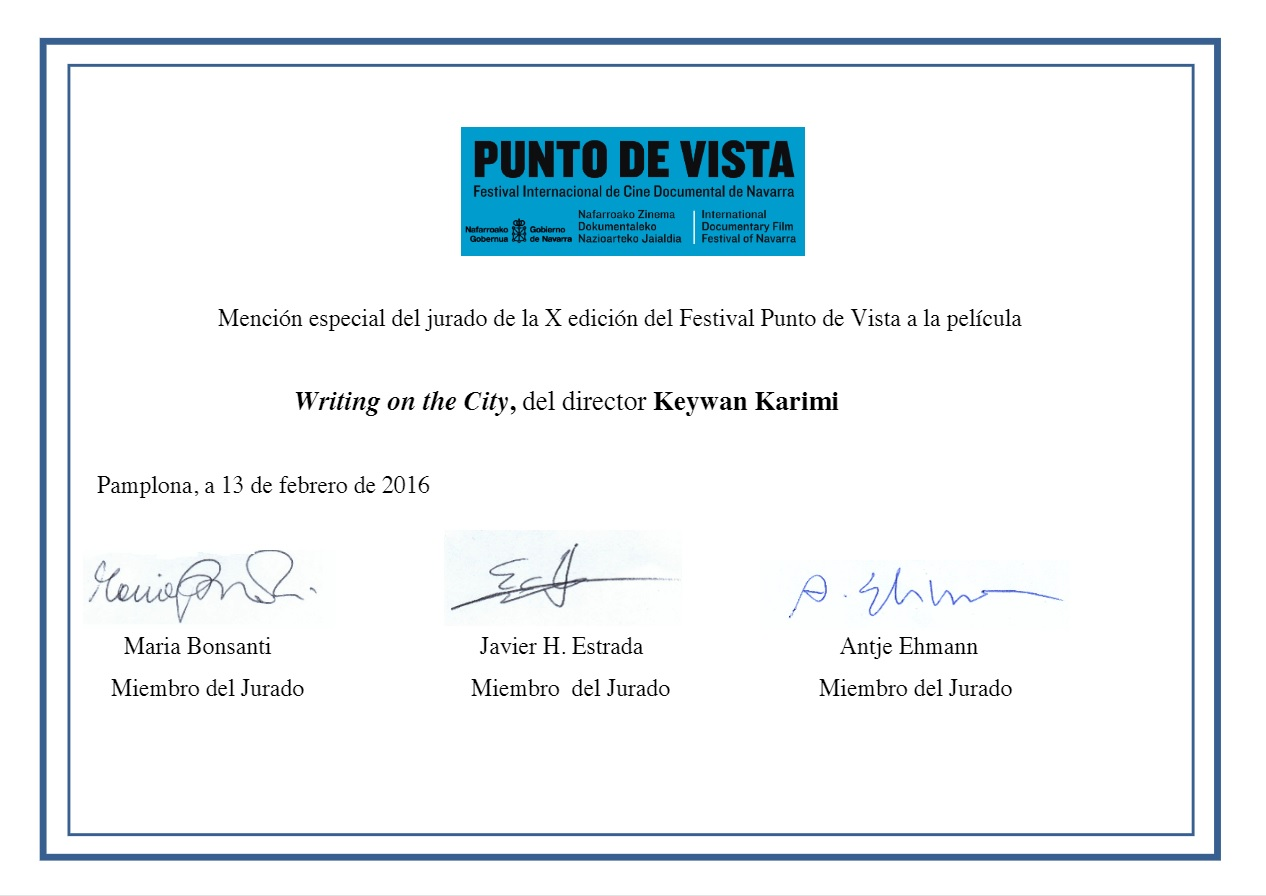
The special jury prize of Spain Punto de vista film festival

Writing on the City was shown in Spain twice; the first time on 12 February 2016 in Punto de vista film festival and won the special jury prize of film festival. The second screening in Spain was on 5 March 2016 in Tabakalera, the international contemporary culture center in San Sebastián. The film also was shown in other Film Festivals. The next was in Switzerland, the Visions du Réel documentary film festival on 21 April 2016 and then in Argentina, the Buenos Aires International Festival of Independent Cinema on 24 April 2016. The documentary was also screened on August year 2016 at the Filmes do Homem International Documentary Film Festival in Portugal.
