= The Last of Us (film) =

2016 film

- Film poster
- Directed by: Ala Eddine Slim
- Written by: Ala Eddine Slim
- Starring: Fethi Akkari
- Release dates: 5 September 2016 (Venice Film Festival); 5 April 2017 (Tunisia)
- Running time: 95 minutes
- Country: Tunisia
- Language: none

The Last of Us is a 2016 Tunisian drama film directed by Ala Eddine Slim. It was selected as the Tunisian entry for the Best Foreign Language Film at the 90th Academy Awards, but it was not nominated.

== Plot ==
Two men travel through the desert in Northern Africa in the covered truck of a smuggler. When the truck stops, they are ambushed and only one narrowly escapes from being captured. He is separated from the other and has to take refuge in the desert, and eventually finds his way alone to a city on the Mediterranean. He gathers materials and sets off across the sea alone in a small boat, and arrives in a deep forest. He navigates the challenges presented by this mysterious and seemingly endless wood, accompanied by a silent old man, and comes to live in a simple and natural manner.

== Cast ==
- Fethi Akkari as M
- Jawhar Soudani as N

== Awards ==
- Luigi De Laurentiis Award for First Feature and Prize for the Best Technical Contribution, Venice Film Festival 2016
- Critics' Week (WP)
- Tanit d'Or for First Film and Best Cinematography (Amine Messadi)
- Carthage Film Festival 2016

== See also ==
- List of submissions to the 90th Academy Awards for Best Foreign Language Film
- List of Tunisian submissions for the Academy Award for Best Foreign Language Film
