= 2024 Stockholm International Film Festival =

2024 film festival

- Opening film: Anora by Sean Baker
- Location: Stockholm, Sweden
- Awards: Bronze Horse (Nickel Boys by RaMell Ross)
- No. of films: 135 from 50 countries
- Festival date: 6–17 November 2024

Stockholm International Film Festival
- 2025 2023

The 35th Stockholm International Film Festival took place from 6 to 17 November 2024 in Stockholm, Sweden. Sean Baker's drama film Anora opened the festival. Historical drama film Nickel Boys won the main award of the festival, Bronze Horse.

Greek-French director Costa-Gavras was honored with the Lifetime Achievement Award.

== Official selection ==
=== Opening film ===
English title	Original title	Director(s)	Production country
Anora		Sean Baker	United States

=== Stockholm Competition ===
The following films were selected for the main international competition:

English title	Original title	Director(s)	Production country
Blue Sun Palace		Constance Tsang	United States
Bluish		Milena Czernovsky, Lilith Kraxner	Austria
Brief History of a Family	家庭简史	Lin Jianjie	China, France, Denmark, Qatar
The Devil's Bath	Des Teufels Bad	Veronika Franz and Severin Fiala	Austria, Germany
Dìdi		Sean Wang	United States
Drowning Dry	Sesės	Laurynas Bareiša	Lithuania, Latvia
Familiar Touch		Sarah Friedland	United States
Ghost Trail	Les Fantômes	Jonathan Millet	Belgium, France, Germany
La cocina		Alonso Ruizpalacios	United States, Mexico
My Sunshine	ぼくのお日さま	Hiroshi Okuyama	Japan
Nickel Boys		RaMell Ross	United States
Peacock	Pfau	Bernhard Wenger	Austria, Germany
Reinas		Klaudia Reynicke	Switzerland, Peru, Spain
Sad Jokes		Fabian Stumm	Germany
Sons	Vogter	Gustav Möller	Denmark, Sweden, France
The Swedish Torpedo	Den svenska torpeden	Frida Kempff	Sweden
Toxic	Akiplėša	Saulė Bliuvaitė	Lithuania
Universal Language	Une langue universelle	Matthew Rankin	Canada
Who Do I Belong To	ماء العين	Meryam Joobeur	Tunisia, Canada, France, Norway, Qatar, Saudi Arabia
Wild Diamond	Diamant brut	Agathe Riedinger	France

=== Stockholm Documentary Competition ===
English title	Original title	Director(s)	Production country
A Family	Une famille	Christine Angot	France
Apocalypse in the Tropics	Apocalipse nos Trópicos	Petra Costa	Brazil, United States, Denmark
Avicii – I'm Tim		Henrik Burman	Sweden, United States
Black Box Diaries		Shiori Itō	Japan, United States, United Kingdom
Ernest Cole: Lost and Found		Raoul Peck	United States
Eternal You		Hans Block, Moritz Riesewieck	Germany, United States
Favoriten		Ruth Beckermann	Austria
Garbo: Where Did You Go?		Lorna Tucker	United Kingdom
Gaucho Gaucho		Michael Dweck, Gregory Kershaw	United States
Hacking Hate		Simon Klose	Sweden, Norway, Denmark
Homegrown		Michael Premo	United States
Never Look Away		Lucy Lawless	New Zealand
Porcelain War		Brendan Bellomo, Slava Leontyev	United States, Australia, Ukraine
Real	Реал	Oleh Sentsov	Croatia, Ukraine
Riefenstahl		Andres Veiel	Germany
Yintah		Brenda Michell, Michael Toledano, Jennifer Wickham	Canada

=== Masters ===
English title	Original title	Director(s)	Production country
A Traveler's Needs	여행자의 필요	Hong Sang-soo	South Korea
Anora		Sean Baker	United States
Blitz		Steve McQueen	United States, United Kingdom
By the Stream	수유천	Hong Sang-soo	South Korea
Cloud	クラウド	Kiyoshi Kurosawa	Japan
Dying	Sterben	Matthias Glasner	Germany
Emilia Pérez		Jacques Audiard	United States, France
Kill the Jockey	El jockey	Luis Ortega	Argentina, Mexico, Spain, Denmark, United States
Last Breath	Le dernier souffle	Costa-Gavras	France
Oh, Canada		Paul Schrader	United States
When Fall Is Coming	Quand vient l'automne	François Ozon	France

=== Open Zone ===
English title	Original title	Director(s)	Production country
Alpha.		Jan-Willem van Ewijk	Netherlands, Switzerland, Slovenia
Animale		Emma Benestan	France
Bushido	碁盤斬り	Kazuya Shiraishi	Japan
Matt and Mara		Kazik Radwanski	Canada
The Mohican	Le Mohican	Frédéric Farrucci	France
The Other Way Around	Volveréis	Jonás Trueba	Spain, France
Red Path	Les Enfants rouges	Lotfi Achour	France, Tunisia
Rumours		Guy Maddin, Evan Johnson, Galen Johnson	Canada, Germany, United States
Sebastian		Mikko Mäkelä	United Kingdom, Finland, Belgium
Souleymane's Story	L'Histoire de Souleymane	Boris Lojkine	France
Stranger Eyes	默視錄	Yeo Siew Hua	Singapore, Taiwan, France, United States
Veni Vidi Vici		Daniel Hoesl, Julia Niemann	Austria
The Witness		Nader Saeivar	Germany, Austria, Iran

=== Icons ===
English title	Original title	Director(s)	Production country
A Real Pain		Jesse Eisenberg	United States, Poland
The Assessment		Fleur Fortuné	Germany
Bob Trevino Likes It		Tracie Laymon	United States
Bring Them Down		Christopher Andrews	Ireland
Maria		Pablo Larraín	Chile, Italy, Germany
Millers in Marriage		Edward Burns	United States
The Return		Uberto Pasolini	Italy, United States, France, Greece, United Kingdom
Sacramento		Michael Angarano	United States
Skincare		Austin Peters	United States, Italy
The Summer Book		Charlie McDowell	United Kingdom, Finland, United States
The Uninvited		Nadia Conners	United States

=== American Independents ===
English title	Original title	Director(s)	Production country
Between the Temples		Nathan Silver	United States
Christmas Eve in Miller's Point		Tyler Taormina	United States
The Code		Eugene Kotlyarenko	United States
Eephus		Carson Lund	United States
Good One		India Donaldson	United States
Millers in Marriage		Edward Burns	United States
Snack Shack		Adam Rehmeier	United States
Thelma		Josh Margolin	United States
Turn Me On		Michael Tyburski	United States
Vulcanizadora		Joel Potrykus	United States

=== Discovery ===
English title	Original title	Director(s)	Production country
The Ballad of Suzanne Césaire		Madeleine Hunt-Ehrlich	United States
Carissa		Devon Delmar, Jason Jacobs	South Africa
Edge of Night		Türker Süer	Germany, Turkey
Gloria!		Margherita Vicario	Italy, Switzerland
The Heirloom		Ben Petrie	Canada
Loveable	Elskling	Lilja Ingolfsdottir	Norway
Manas		Marianna Brennand	Brazil
No Sleep Till		Alexandra Simpson	United States, Switzerland
One of Those Days When Hemme Dies	Hemme'nin öldüğü günlerden biri	Murat Fıratoğlu	Turkey
Panopticon	Panoptikoni	George Sikharulidze	France, Georgia, Italy, Romania
Sugar Island		Johanne Gómez Terrero	Dominican Republic, Spain
The Umesh Chronicles		Pooja Kaul	Sweden, India

=== Twilight Zone ===
English title	Original title	Director(s)	Production country
Apartment 7A		Natalie Erika James	United States, Australia, United Kingdom
Exhuma	파묘	Jang Jae-hyun	South Korea
Frogman		Anthony Cousins	United States
Heretic		Scott Beck and Bryan Woods	United States
I, the Executioner	베테랑2	Ryoo Seung-wan	South Korea
I Saw the TV Glow		Jane Schoenbrun	United States
In a Violent Nature		Chris Nash	Canada
Nightbitch		Marielle Heller	United States
Sister Midnight		Karan Kandhari	United Kingdom
Twilight of the Warriors: Walled In	九龙城寨之围城	Soi Cheang	Hong Kong

=== Stockholm Series ===
English title	Original title	Creator(s)	Production country
End of Summer (episodes 1–2)	Slutet på sommaren	Björn Carlström, Stefan Thunberg	Sweden
The Helicopter Heist (episodes 1–2)	Helikopterrånet	Ronnie Sandahl	Sweden
The Pirate Bay		Piotr Marciniak	Sweden
Vargasommar		Jesper Ganslandt, Oskar Söderlund	Sweden
Whiskey on the Rocks (episodes 1–3)		Björn Stein	Sweden
Special Presentation
Yellowstone (season 5, part 2; episode 1)		Taylor Sheridan, John Linson	United States

== Awards ==
The following awards were presented at the festival:

- Best Film (Bronze Horse): Nickel Boys by RaMell Ross
- Best Director: Matthew Rankin for Universal Language
- Best First Feature: Peacock by Bernhard Wenger
- Best Screenplay: Alonso Ruizpalacios for La cocina
- Best Actress: Malou Khébizi for Wild Diamond
- Best Actor: Izaac Wang for Dìdi
- Best Cinematography: Martin Gschlacht for The Devil's Bath
- Best Documentary: Porcelain War by Brendan Bellomo and Slava Leontyev
- Best Short: The Sea In Between by Lun Sevnik

=== Lifetime Achievement Award ===
- Costa-Gavras

=== Stockholm Achievement Award ===
- Jesse Eisenberg

=== Visionary Award ===
- Sean Baker
- Steve McQueen

=== Rising Star Award ===
- Erik Svedberg-Zelman
