= Rita (2009 Italian film) =

- Directed by: Fabio Grassadonia and Antonio Piazza
- Written by: Fabio Grassadonia, Antonio Piazza
- Produced by: Massimo Cristaldi
- Starring: Marta Palermo
- Cinematography: Olaf Hirschberg
- Edited by: Desideria Rayner
- Release date: 2009
- Running time: 19 minutes
- Country: Italy
- Language: Italian

Rita is an Italian short drama film released in 2009 and directed by Fabio Grassadonia and Antonio Piazza. It is a film realised from the point of view of a blind person. It has been presented in more than 100 international film festivals receiving several awards.

== Plot ==
Rita is ten years old and blind since birth, lives in a seaside neighbourhood of Palermo in Sicily. She is stubborn, curious and feels thwarted by an overprotective dictatorial mother. The claustrophobic world of her home is suddenly breached by a mysterious presence. It's a boy on the run, wounded, terrified. The meeting between the two of them is highly enigmatic. Thanks to her mysterious new friend, or perhaps only thanks to her imagination and courage, Rita escapes from home and goes to the beach. She learns to swim and experiences a brief moment of freedom which ends when the miraculous encounter vanishes and she finds herself alone in the sea.

== Film structure ==
During this short film the camera is focused on Rita, without reverse angle shots. Rita is under everyone's gaze, the gaze of others which acts also as a controlling element, a form of surveillance. We can't see what Rita has before her because she can't either. For example, we see her mother's hands flit in and out of the frame, when her mother is fussing around her, but we never see her mother. We feel the desire to see what stands before her but, for the most part of the short film, we are not granted any gratification of this desire. For Rita hearing is fundamental, and that is why the story, from her "point of view" is told through the sounds, the noises. The sounds represent what we can't see, they evoke it, and to some extent create it. Only through an unexpected and enigmatic encounter does the staging change, because this meeting suddenly enables her to "see" and we, for the first time, are gifted with her perspective and share her vision. The film explores this brief moment of grace. Then everything goes back to normal for Rita and for us.

== Cast ==
- Marta Palermo as Rita
- Marco Correnti as the young boy

== Awards ==
Best Short Film 11th International Film Festival Bratislava | 2009 27 Nov – 4 Dec | Slovakia

Arte Prize for European Short Film 22nd Premiers Plans Festival d’Angers | 2010 Angers First Film Festival 22 – 31 Jan | France

Diploma of Merit 40th Tampereen kansainväliset elokuvajuhlat | 2010 Tampere Film Festival 10 – 14 Mar | Finland

Best Short Film 11th Festival Internacional de Cine Las Palmas de Gran Canaria | 2010 Las Palmas de Gran Canaria International Film Festival 12 – 20 Mar | Spain

Award for Directing 19th Aspen Shortsfest | 2010 6 – 11 Apr | United States

Best Use of Sound Design 37th Athens International Film and Video Festival | 2010 23 – 29 Apr | United States

Special Jury Prize - National 18th Arcipelago Festival Internazionale di Cortometraggi e Nuove Immagini | 2010 Arcipelago International Festival of Short Films and New Images 18 – 24 Jun | Italy

Best International Short Film 64th Edinburgh International Film Festival | 2010 16 – 27 Jun | United Kingdom

Best Italian Short Film 8th MoliseCinema Film Festival | 2010 3 – 8 Aug | Italy

Special Mention - Artistic Direction 9th Concorto Film Festival | 2010 22 – 29 Aug | Italy

Special Jury Mention 8th Imaginaria Film Festival | 2010 24 – 29 Aug | Italy

Jury Mention 16th Aye Aye Film Festival Nancy-Lorraine | 2010 3 – 11 Sep | France

Best Sound 3rd Festival Internacional Curtametraxes Bueu | 2010 Bueu International Shortfilm Festival 6 – 11 Sep | Spain

Best Short Fiction Film 17th Altin Koza Film Festival | 2010 Golden Boll Film Festival 20 – 26 Sep | Turkey

Special Jury Mention 7th Filmfest Eberswalde | 2010 2 – 9 Oct | Germany

Best Short Film 8th Zagreb Film Festival | 2010 17 – 23 Oct | Croatia

Special Jury Mention - Narrative Short Film Abu Dhabi Film Festival | 2010 14 – 23 Oct | United Arab Emirates

Artistic Direction Award 10th Cortopotere ShortFilmFestival | 2010 25 – 31 Oct | Italy

Special Jury Mention - European Short Films 40th Alcine: Festival de Cine de Alcalá de Henares | 2010 5 – 13 Nov | Spain

Special Jury Mention 25th Festival Europeen du Film Court de Brest | 2010

Brest European Short Film Festival

8 – 14 Nov | France

Best Short Feature Film 5th Breaking Down Barriers Disability Film Festival | 2010 18 – 21 Nov | Russia

Best European Film 4th Unlimited: Europäisches Kurzfilmfestival | 2010 Unlimited: European Short Film Festival 23 – 28 Nov | Germany

Best Short Film on Social Themes 7th Corto Dorico: Festival del Cortometraggio Italiano | 2010 12 – 19 Dec | Italy

Special Mention Nastri D'Argento | 2011 25 – 28 Mar | Italy

Runner-up - 16 to 30 minutes Imago Film Festival | 2011 28 Mar – 1 Apr | United States

Special Jury Prize 27th Festival du Cinema Européen de Lille | 2011 European Film Festival of Lille 1 – 8 Apr | France

Future Shorts Prize 27th Festival du Cinema Européen de Lille | 2011 European Film Festival of Lille 1 – 8 Apr | France

Best Short Film 6th Sicilian Film Festival | 2011 6 – 13 Apr | United States

Best Film - Youth Jury 23rd Filmfest Dresden: Internationales Kurzfilmfestival | 2011 Filmfest Dresden: International Short Film Festival 12 – 17 Apr | Germany

Special Jury Mention 23rd Filmfest Dresden: Internationales Kurzfilmfestival | 2011 Filmfest Dresden: International Short Film Festival 12 – 17 Apr | Germany

Highly Commended - International Magma Short Film Festival | 2011 28 Apr – 2 May | New Zealand

Outstanding Achievement in Short Filmmaking 12th Newport Beach Film Festival | 2011 28 Apr – 5 May | United States

Best Narrative Short Film 14th Brooklyn Film Festival | 2011 3 – 12 Jun | United States

Best International Short Film Lume International Film Festival | 2011 14 – 23 Jul | Brazil

Best Drama Short Film 10th Route 66 Film Festival | 2011 16 – 18 Sep | United States

Director's Choice 30th Black Maria Film and Video Festival | 2011 6 Feb – 31 Mar | United States

Special Mention 8th Sedicicorto: Festival del Cortometraggio Forlì | 2011 Sedicicorto: International Film Festival Forlì 3 – 9 Oct | Italy

Best Short Film 4th Festival de Cine Italiano de Madrid | 2011 24 Nov – 1 Dec | Spain

Award of Excellence - Disability Issues The Accolade Competition | 2011 1 Jan – 31 Dec | United States
