= Malou Khebizi =

French actress

- Khebizi in 2026
- Born: 2003 (age 22–23); Marseille, France
- Occupation: Actress
- Years active: 2024–present

Malou Khebizi is a French actress, most known for her debut performance in Wild Diamond (2024). For A Place to Heal (2026), she won the Marcello Mastroianni Award at the 83rd Venice International Film Festival.

== Early life ==
Born in Marseille in 2003, she grew up in Trets, where she attended school up to the end of middle school and practiced gymnastics at a UFOLEP club between the ages of 4 and 16; she later moved back to Marseille, living under a shared custody arrangement with her parents following their separation.

== Career ==
Her debut performance came as the 19-year-old Liane in Wild Diamond (2024) directed by Agathe Riedinger, the film premiered in the main competition of the 77th Cannes Film Festival, and explores beauty and fame standards in contemporary France. For her performance, she was nominated for the César Award for Best Female Revelation.

Khebizi followed with small roles in Robin Campillo's Enzo and Anna Cazenave Cambet's Love Me Tender (both in 2025), alongside Hélène Rosselet-Ruiz's Le Triangle d'Or and Christophe Honoré's Orange-Flavoured Wedding (both in 2026).

For her performance as Lucia in A Place to Heal (2026), directed by Cédric Kahn, about two French teenage girls admitted into the adolescent psychiatric ward of a public hospital, she won the Marcello Mastroianni Award at the 83rd Venice International Film Festival.

== Filmography ==
=== Feature films ===
Year	English title	Original title	Role	Notes
2024	Wild Diamond	Diamant brut	Liane Pougy	
2025	Enzo		Amina	
2025	Love Me Tender			
2025	The Girls We Want	Les Filles désir	Ranya	
2026	Golden Triangle	Le Triangle d'or	Laura Sanchez	
2026	Orange-Flavoured Wedding	Mariage au goût d'orange	Martine	
2026	A Place to Heal	15/18	Lucia	
TBA		L'art et la manière	Mado	Post-production

=== Television ===
- 2025: Young Millionaires as Samia
