= Anytime Anywhere =

Anytime Anywhere may refer to:

- Anytime...Anywhere, an album by Rita Coolidge
- "Anytime Anywhere" (song), by Milet
- "Anytime Anywhere", a song by Gotthard from the album Lipservice
- "Anytime Anywhere", a song by S Club Juniors from the album Together
- "Anytime, Anywhere", a song by Miho Karasawa
- "Anytime, Anywhere", a song by Sarah Brightman from the album Eden
- "Anytime, Anywhere", an episode of the television series Stingray
- Anytime Anywhere! Sho Kosugi's Towel Exercise, a television show starring Sho Kosugi
- Quisquam Usquam, Latin phrase meaning "Anytime Anywhere", used as the motto of the United States 174th Air Defense Artillery Brigade

== See also ==
- Anywhere Anytime
