= Peacock (2024 film) =

2024 comedy-drama film

- Theatrical release poster
- Directed by: Bernhard Wenger
- Written by: Bernhard Wenger
- Produced by: Michael Kitzberger; Wolfgang Widerhofer; Nikolaus Geyrhalter
- Starring: Albrecht Schuch; Julia Franz Richter; Anton Noori; Theresa Frostad Eggesbø
- Cinematography: Albin Wildner
- Edited by: Rupert Höller
- Music by: Lukas Lauermann
- Production companies: Nikolaus Geyrhalter Filmproduktion; CALA Filmproduktion
- Distributed by: Filmcasino & polyfilm Betriebs (Austria); Wild Bunch (Germany)
- Release dates: 30 August 2024 (Venice); 20 February 2025 (Austria)
- Running time: 102 minutes
- Countries: Austria; Germany
- Languages: German; English
- Box office: $179,488

Peacock (German: Pfau – Bin ich echt?, lit. 'Peacock: Am I Real?') is a 2024 satirical tragicomedy film written and directed by Bernhard Wenger, in his feature film debut. Starring Albrecht Schuch, Julia Franz Richter, Anton Noori and Theresa Frostad Eggesbø.

The film had its world premiere in Critic's Week section of the 81st Venice International Film Festival on 30 August 2024. It was theatrically released in Austria and Germany on 20 February 2025. It was selected as the Austrian entry for Best International Feature Film at the 98th Academy Awards, but it was not nominated.

== Cast ==
- Albrecht Schuch as Matthias
- Julia Franz Richter as Sophia
- Anton Noori as David
- Theresa Frostad Eggesbø as Ina
- Branko Samarovski as Johann
- Maria Hofstätter as Vera
- Salka Weber as Nora

== Release ==
The film had its US theatrical release in September 2025 via US distributor Oscilloscope. Peacock was distributed by World Sales MK2 Films to more than 30 territories and after its Venice Film Festival premiere was selected by international film festivals including Chicago International Film Festival, Glasgow Film Festival, Vienna International Film Festival, Hong Kong Film Festival and New Zealand International Film Festival.

== Reception ==
The film won the Best First Feature Award at the 35th Stockholm International Film Festival. For his performance, Albrecht Schuch was awarded Best Leading Actor at Austrian Film Awards.

== See also ==
- List of submissions to the 98th Academy Awards for Best International Feature Film
- List of Austrian submissions for the Academy Award for Best International Feature Film
