= Miyazaki, Spirit of Nature =

2024 documentary film

- Directed by: Léo Favier
- Written by: Léo Favier; Léo Brachet
- Starring: Goro Miyazaki; Toshio Suzuki; Susan J. Napier; Timothy Morton; Shinichi Fukuoka; Philippe Descola
- Edited by: Mathilde Morières
- Music by: Camille Delafon
- Release date: 31 August 2024 (Venice)
- Country: France

Miyazaki, Spirit of Nature (French: Miyazaki, l'esprit de la nature) is a 2024 documentary film co-written and directed by Léo Favier. It had its world premiere at the 81st edition of the Venice Film Festival.

== Overview ==
The film analyzes Hayao Miyazaki's body of work from an environmental point of view, particularly focusing on Miyazaki's relationship with nature.

== Release ==
The film premiered at the 81st Venice International Film Festival, in the Venice Classics sidebar.

== Reception ==
Barry Levitt from The Daily Beast described the film as "a tantalizing portrait of a filmmaker often at war with himself, a man with an undying love for the environment around him mired in increasing despair at the state of the world", and wrote that "even those who've seen every Miyazaki film many times will find exciting new insights here." La Croix's Stephane Dreyfus referred to the film as "a well-conducted documentary, rich in archives and enlightening interviews". Télérama's film critic Cécile Mury wrote: "this rich and beautiful documentary by Léo Favier invites us to rediscover him in depth: an intelligent tribute, gracefully weaving together the threads of biography and analysis of a work".
