= Enzo (film) =

2025 French drama film

- Film poster
- Directed by: Robin Campillo
- Written by: Laurent Cantet; Robin Campillo; Gilles Marchand
- Produced by: Marie-Ange Luciani
- Starring: Eloy Pohu; Maksym Slivinskyi; Pierfrancesco Favino; Élodie Bouchez
- Cinematography: Jeanne Lapoirie
- Edited by: Robin Campillo
- Production companies: Les Films de Pierre; France 3 Cinéma; Page 114; Ami Paris; Les Films du Fleuve; Be TV; RTBF; Lucky Red
- Distributed by: Ad Vitam (France); Lucky Red (Italy)
- Release date: 14 May 2025 (Cannes)
- Running time: 103 minutes
- Countries: France; Belgium; Italy
- Languages: French; Ukrainian

Enzo is a 2025 coming-of-age drama film directed by Robin Campillo, and co-written by Campillo, Laurent Cantet and Gilles Marchand. The film is a co-production between France, Belgium and Italy.

The film had its world premiere at the Directors' Fortnight section of the 2025 Cannes Film Festival on 14 May 2025.

== Plot ==
Enzo, a teenager who rejects the expectations of his wealthy parents, takes an apprenticeship at a building site where he develops a crush on Vlad, a Ukrainian bricklayer who is struggling with whether or not to return home and fight in the Russo-Ukrainian War.

== Cast ==
- Eloy Pohu as Enzo
- Pierfrancesco Favino as Paolo
- Élodie Bouchez as Marion
- Maksym Slivinskyi as Vlad
- Nathan Japy as Victor
- Vladislav Holyk as Miroslav
- Malou Khebizi as Amina
- Philippe Petit as Corelli
- Charline Paul as Léa
- Mounir Margoum as Max

== Production ==
The film was written by Campillo, Laurent Cantet and Gilles Marchand, and was originally slated to be directed by Cantet; however, although Cantet had completed casting most of the actors, it had not yet entered photography at the time of Cantet's death of cancer in April 2024, and Campillo, a frequent collaborator with Cantet, stepped in as director.

The film is a co-production between France, Belgium and Italy. It was produced by Les Films de Pierre, France 3 Cinéma, Page 114, Ami Paris, Les Films du Fleuve, Be TV, RTBF and Lucky Red.

The film was shot in La Ciotat in the late spring of 2024.

As a result of the film's circumstances, Cantet is given an unusual "a film by" credit separately from Campillo's directorial credit, and Campillo himself describes it as Cantet's film rather than his.

== Distribution ==
The film premiered as the opening film of the Directors' Fortnight program at the 2025 Cannes Film Festival.

== Reception ==
=== Critical response ===
Peter Debruge of Variety wrote that the film "reflects how a rebel without a cause finds something to care about, if you will. In Enzo's case, his engagement is mixed up with an infatuation he's uncertain how to process, which is partly explained by a phone call every bit as moving as the one that closes "Call Me by Your Name." Enzo may not be so bright in scholastic terms, but he's far more sensitive than his family seems to realize, and there's a certain irony to the way this movie asks us to intellectualize someone operating on instinct, stumbling toward a better understanding of himself."

For The Hollywood Reporter, Jordan Mintzer wrote that "the filmmakers are never conclusive about Enzo's burgeoning sexuality nor his plans for the future, and that's clearly by design. They don't want to hem their young hero in, preferring to let the boy discover himself the way so many kids do at that age. It's an extremely honest depiction of adolescence, but one that doesn't always make for compelling drama. The result is a film that fails to pack a sufficient emotional charge, even if it leaves us longing to know where Enzo will go next."

Peter Bradshaw of The Guardian wrote that "there's something tragicomic and absurd about poor Enzo, absurd and humiliating in the way teenage yearning often is – and Enzo's dad's suspicion of self-harm turns out to be shrewder than he thought. Campillo and Cantet show us that the agonies of being young and existentially rebellious are not simply shallow and callow: they represent a state of idealism which is poignantly brief, like everything else about youth. It is another powerful, absorbing picture from Campillo and a fitting swan song for Laurent Cantet."

On review aggregator website Rotten Tomatoes, the film holds an approval rating of 90% based on 29 reviews, with an average rating of 7.2/10. On Metacritic, the film has a weighted average score of 69 out of 100, based on 9 critics, indicating "generally favorable reviews".
