= Battlefield (2024 film) =

2024 film directed by Gianni Amelio

- Theatrical release poster
- Italian: Campo di battaglia
- Directed by: Gianni Amelio
- Written by: Gianni Amelio; Alberto Taraglio
- Produced by: Simone Gattoni; Marco Bellocchio; Beppe Caschetto; Bruno Benetti
- Starring: Alessandro Borghi; Gabriel Montesi; Federica Rosellini
- Cinematography: Luan Amelio Ujkaj
- Edited by: Simona Paggi
- Music by: Franco Piersanti
- Production companies: Kavac Film; IBC Movie; One Art; Rai Cinema
- Distributed by: 01 Distribution
- Release dates: 31 August 2024 (Venice); 5 September 2024 (Italy)
- Running time: 104 minutes
- Country: Italy
- Language: Italian

Battlefield (Italian: Campo di battaglia) is a 2024 Italian war drama film directed by Gianni Amelio, written by Amelio and Alberto Taraglio, and starring Alessandro Borghi as a World War I-era doctor in Northern Italy.

The film premiered at the 81st Venice International Film Festival, where it competed for the Golden Lion, and was released in Italy by 01 Distribution on 5 September 2024.

== Plot ==
In 1918, towards the end of World War I, two medical officers—childhood friends Stefano and Giulio—are working at the same military hospital in the Veneto region. Stefano, a captain in the Army Medical Corps from a wealthy bourgeois family, is a staunch nationalist who strives to send wounded soldiers back to the front; in contrast, Giulio, a lieutenant with a background in biology, is moved to pity by their plight. The two men also share a love for the same woman, Anna, a Red Cross nurse. Within the hospital, the condition of many wounded soldiers worsens due to Giulio’s actions—he performs amputations to secure their discharge and send them home—and both Stefano and Anna begin to suspect him. Shortly thereafter, an infectious disease spreads among the troops, and Stefano is forced to have the infected patients moved away from the hospital to contain the outbreak. Giulio is among the infected; Stefano regards him as the only one capable of understanding the situation given his biological expertise. However, while attempting to identify the bacterium and find a cure, Giulio contracts the disease himself and decides to hasten his death by injecting the contents of an infected test tube, while Stefano hints that he intends to abandon both his military and medical careers to enter politics.

== Cast ==
- Alessandro Borghi
- Gabriel Montesi
- Federica Rosellini
- Giovanni Scotti
- Vince Vivenzio
- Alberto Cracco
- Luca Lazzareschi
- Maria Grazia Plos
- Rita Bosello

== Release ==
In July 2024, Battlefield was announced as a main competition entry at that year's Venice International Film Festival.

== Reception ==
=== Critical response ===
On Rotten Tomatoes, the film has a rating of 80%, based on seven critics. The Guardian gave to the film a rating of 3 on 4 stars.

=== Awards and nominations ===
Award	Year	Category	Nominated work	Result	Ref
Golden Lion (Venice Film Festival)	2024	Best film	Battlefield	Nominated	
