= Orange-Flavoured Wedding =

2026 French comedy-drama film

- French: Mariage au goût d'orange
- Directed by: Christophe Honoré
- Written by: Christophe Honoré
- Based on: Le Ciel de Nantes by Christophe Honoré
- Produced by: Philippe Martin
- Starring: Adèle Exarchopoulos; Vincent Lacoste; Paul Kircher; Alban Lenoir; Nadia Tereszkiewicz; Malou Khebizi
- Cinematography: Jeanne Lapoirie
- Edited by: Chantal Hymans
- Production companies: Les Films Pelléas; Chi-Fou-Mi Productions; Trésor Films
- Distributed by: Ad Vitam
- Release dates: 20 May 2026 (Cannes); 9 December 2026 (France)
- Running time: 115 minutes
- Country: France
- Language: French

Orange-Flavoured Wedding (French: Mariage au goût d'orange) is a 2026 French comedy-drama film written and directed by Christophe Honoré, and based on his 2021's autobiographical play Le Ciel de Nantes. Starring Adèle Exarchopoulos and Vincent Lacoste, it follows the Puig family during a bittersweet marriage in 1978's Nantes.

The film had its world premiere at the Cannes Premiere section of the 2026 Cannes Film Festival on 18 May 2026. It's schedule to be theatrically released in France by Ad Vitam on 9 December.

== Premise ==
In a church in a suburb of Nantes, in March 1978, the Puig family attends the wedding of Jacques, the youngest of the seven children, and Martine, who lives in the same family neighborhood. Jacques' father, not having been invited due to his long-standing exile, reappears, questioning whether Jacques and Martine truly love each other.

== Cast ==
- Adèle Exarchopoulos as Claudie
- Vincent Lacoste as Dominique
- Paul Kircher as Jacques
- Alban Lenoir as Roger
- Nadia Tereszkiewicz as Marie-Do
- Malou Khebizi as Martine
- Myriem Akheddiou as Annie
- Noée Abita as Isabelle
- Xavier Lacaille as Guy
- Saadia Bentaïeb as Mémé
- Victoire Du Bois as Odette
- Jules Sagot as Claude
- Joann Brezot as Frédéric
- Prune Bozo as Pascale
- Park Ji-min as Michou
- Andranic Manet as Pierre-François

== Production ==
=== Development ===
Produced by Philippe Martin for Les Films Pelléas, in co-production with Chi-Fou-Mi Productions and Trésor Films. Supported by Canal+, Netflix, Ad Vitam, Pyramide International, Centre national du cinéma et de l'image animée (CNC), Région Bretagne and Région Pays de la Loire.

In early December 2025, Honoré was revealed to be preparing his 17th feature film, revisiting the family theme of his autobiographical play Le Ciel de Nantes (2021). Vincent Lacoste and Adèle Exarchopoulos were also announced in the main roles, marking the duo fifth screen collaboration. Paul Kircher, Nadia Tereszkiewicz, Alban Lenoir, Noée Abita, Malou Khebizi and Park Ji-min were also announced in supporting roles.

=== Filming ===
Principal photography began on 2 February 2026, on location in Rennes, including filming at the Guillaume-Régnier Hospital and in the streets of the Foyer Rennais, which were decorated the streets in 1970s style. Filming also took place in Vern-d'Anjou and Erdre-en-Anjou on 12 February, and then in Angers on 6 March. Shooting wrapped on 13 March.

Jeanne Lapoirie served as cinematographer, and shot the film on 35mm.

=== Post-production ===
Honoré fast-tracked the editing aiming the 2026 Cannes Film Festival, on 23 April 2026 the film was confirmed at the festival's official selection, alongside a poster and synopsis. Post-production lasted roughly two months.

== Release ==
The film had its world premiere at the Cannes Premiere section of the 2026 Cannes Film Festival on 18 May 2026. It's schedule to be theatrically released in France by Ad Vitam on 9 December.

Pyramide International will handle international sales.
