= Sicilian Letters =

2024 film by Fabio Grassadonia and Antonio Piazza

- Theatrical release poster
- Sicilian: Iddu – L'ultimo padrino
- Directed by: Fabio Grassadonia; Antonio Piazza
- Written by: Fabio Grassadonia; Antonio Piazza
- Produced by: Nicola Giuliano; Francesca Cima; Carlotta Calori; Viola Prestieri
- Starring: Toni Servillo; Elio Germano
- Cinematography: Luca Bigazzi
- Edited by: Paola Freddi
- Music by: Colapesce
- Production companies: Indigo Film; Rai Cinema; Les Films du Losange
- Distributed by: 01 Distribution (Italy); Les Films du Losange (France)
- Release dates: 5 September 2024 (Venice); 10 October 2024 (Italy); 16 April 2025 (France)
- Running time: 122 minutes
- Countries: Italy; France
- Languages: Italian; Sicilian
- Box office: $2.3 million

Sicilian Letters (Sicilian: Iddu – L'ultimo padrino, lit. 'He – The Last Godfather') is a 2024 crime drama film written and directed by Fabio Grassadonia and Antonio Piazza. The film stars Elio Germano as Sicilian Mafia boss Matteo Messina Denaro and Toni Servillo as Catello, an operative in the Italian secret service.

The film premiered on 5 September 2024 at the 81st Venice International Film Festival, where it competed for the Golden Lion. It was released theatrically in Italy on 10 October 2024 by 01 Distribution and in France on 16 April 2025 by Les Films du Losange.

== Premise ==
In the early 2000s, the embattled politician Catello seeks to revive his career by helping the Secret Service track down the last known Cosa Nostra boss, Matteo Messina Denaro, whom Catello has known his entire life. The two begin corresponding via letters in a game of cat and mouse.

== Cast ==
- Toni Servillo as Catello, a secret services operative
- Elio Germano as Matteo Messina Denaro
- Daniela Marra as Rita Mancuso
- Barbora Bobulova as Lucia Russo
- Giuseppe Tantillo as Pino Tumino
- Fausto Russo Alesi as Emilio Schiavon
- Antonia Truppo as Stefania
- Tommaso Ragno as Papacena
- Betti Pedrazzi as Elvira
- Filippo Luna as Giovannino
- Rosario Palazzolo as Don Gaetano
- Roberto De Francesco as senator
- Vincenzo Ferrera as assessor
- Maurizio Marchetti as Marshal Di Graziano
- Gianluca Zaccaria as Corporal Battaglia
- Lucio Patanè as Mayor Manciaracina

== Production ==
Initially, the film had the working title Lettere a Catello ("Letters to Catello"), a title based on Salvatore Mugno's book about Messina Denaro Lettere a Svetonio. Grassadonia and Piazza worked for two years on the screenplay. The film was shot in the summer of 2023 in Trapani, Sciacca, Salemi and Selinunte.

== Release ==
Sicilian Letters premiered at the 81st Venice International Film Festival on 5 September 2024 as a main competition entry. The film was released theatrically in Italy on 10 October 2024 by 01 Distribution and in France on 16 April 2025 by Les Films du Losange.
