= Soul of the Desert =

2024 film by Monica Taboada Tapia

- Spanish: Alma del desierto
- Directed by: Mónica Taboada-Tapia
- Written by: Mónica Taboada-Tapia
- Produced by: Beto Rosero; Mónica Taboada-Tapia
- Starring: Georgina Epiayu
- Cinematography: Rafael David Gonzalez; Tininiska Simpson
- Edited by: Will Domingos
- Music by: O Grivo
- Production companies: Guerrero Films; Estúdio Giz
- Release dates: 5 September 2024 (Venice); 1 May 2025 (Colombia)
- Running time: 87 minutes
- Countries: Colombia; Brazil
- Languages: Wayuunaiki; Spanish

Soul of the Desert (Spanish: Alma del desierto) is a 2024 documentary film directed by Mónica Taboada-Tapia. The film centres on Georgina Epiayu, a transgender Wayuu woman who is struggling to navigate Colombian bureaucracy to acquire a new identity card that reflects her gender.

It is an expansion of an earlier short documentary film, Two-Spirit, which was nominated for the International Documentary Association and distributed online by The New Yorker.

The film premiered in the Giornate degli Autori program at the 81st Venice International Film Festival, where it was named the winner of the Queer Lion. Additionally, it was nominated for the 2025 ICS Awards by the International Cinephile Society. The film was commercially released on May 1, 2025, in Colombian theaters.
