= After Party (film) =

2024 drama film

- Directed by: Vojtech Strakaty
- Written by: Vojtech Strakaty
- Produced by: Marek Novak
- Starring: Eliska Basusová
- Cinematography: Stanislav Adam
- Edited by: Filip de Pina
- Release date: September 5, 2024 (Venice)
- Language: Czech

After Party is a 2024 Czech coming-of-age drama film written and directed by Vojtech Strakaty, in his feature film debut. The film premiered at the 81st edition of the Venice Film Festival.

== Cast ==
- Eliska Basusová as Jindriska
- Anna Perinová as Karolina
- Jan Zadrazil as Father
- Daniel Kadlec as Adam

== Production ==
In 2018, the film's screenplay was awarded the Star of Tomorrow in the Czech Film Foundation competition for unrealised scripts. The film was produced by Xova Film, with Česká Televize, i/o Post and Studio Beep serving as co-producers. It initially had the working title Eternal Peace (Věčný klid). It was shot in 14 1/2 days.

== Release ==
The film had its world premiere at the 81st Venice International Film Festival in the Orizzonti Extra sidebar. It was released on Czech cinemas on 14 November 2024.
