= Marcello Mastroianni Award =

Emerging actors prize of the Venice Film Festival

- 2026 recipient: Malou Khebizi
- Awarded for: Best Performance by an Emerging Actor or Actress
- Country: Italy
- Presented by: Venice Film Festival
- First award: 1998
- Currently held by: Malou Khebizi for A Place to Heal (2026)
- Website: labiennale.org/en/cinema

The Marcello Mastroianni Award (Italian: Premio Marcello Mastroianni) is one of the awards given out at the Venice Film Festival.

French actress Malou Khebizi was the most recent winner for her performance in A Place to Heal (2026), at the 83rd Venice International Film Festival.

== History ==
It was established in 1998 in honor of the Italian actor Marcello Mastroianni, who died at the end of 1996. The award was created to recognize an emerging actor or actress. Since then, several future high profile worldwide actors were awarded: Gael García Bernal, Diego Luna, Hafsia Herzi, Jennifer Lawrence, Jasmine Trinca, Mila Kunis, Tye Sheridan, Paula Beer and Taylor Russell.

Italian actor Niccolò Senni was the first winner for Shooting the Moon (1998) at the 55th Venice International Film Festival.

Fabrizio Falco is the only actor who won for two different films in the same edition, for Dormant Beauty and It Was the Son (both in 2012), at the 69th Venice International Film Festival.

== Winners ==
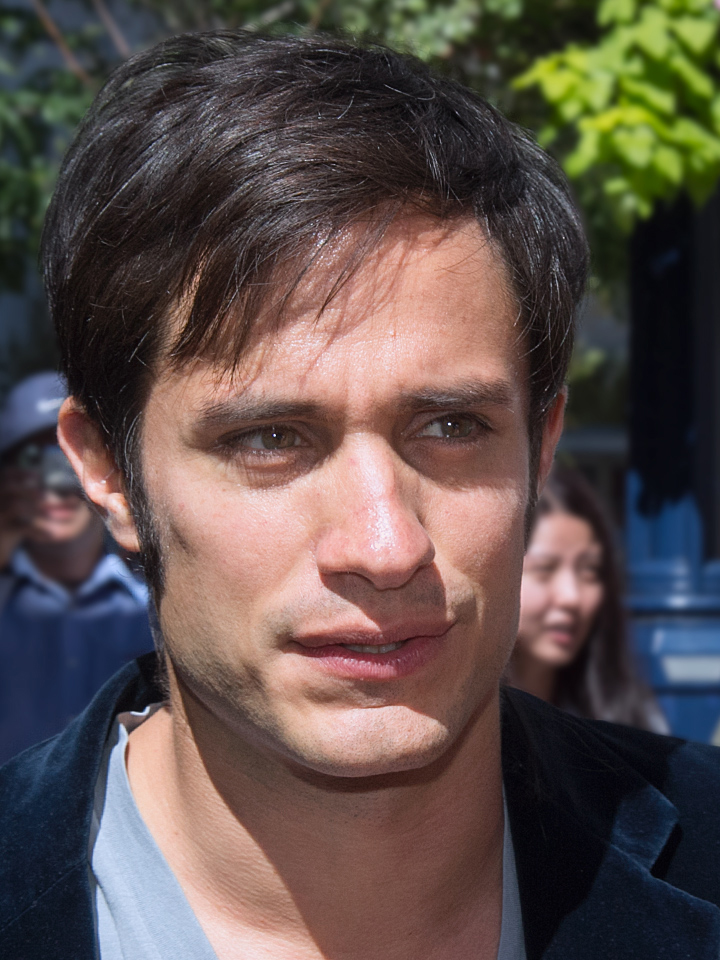
Gael García Bernal won for Y tu mamá también (2001)

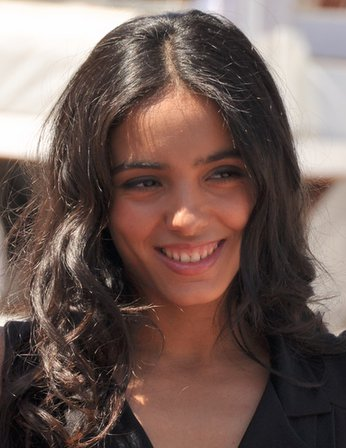
Hafsia Herzi won for The Secret of the Grain (2007)

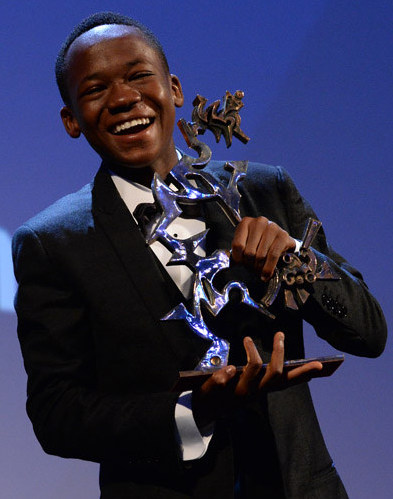
Abraham Attah won for Beasts of No Nation (2015)

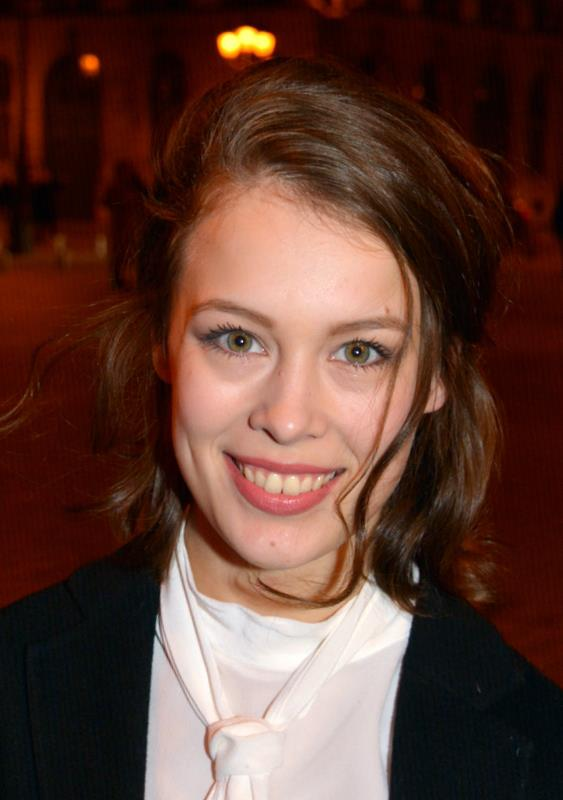
Paula Beer won for Frantz (2016)

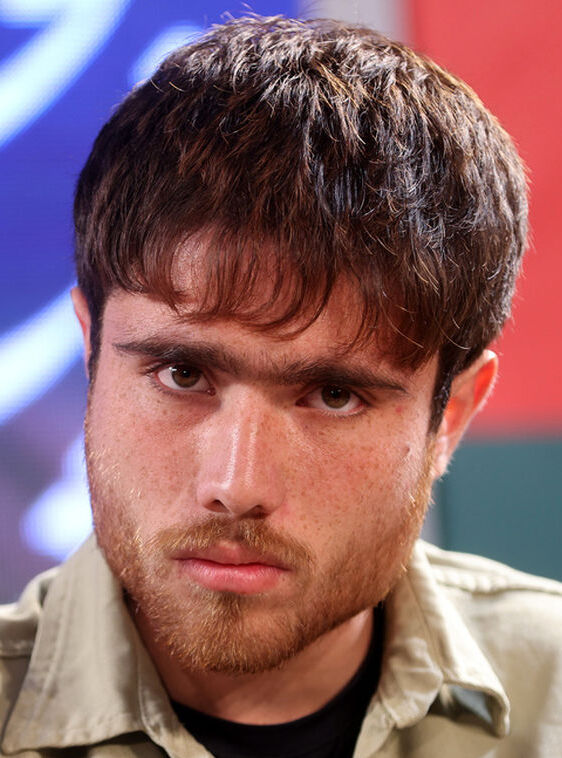
Rouhollah Zamani won for Sun Children (2020)

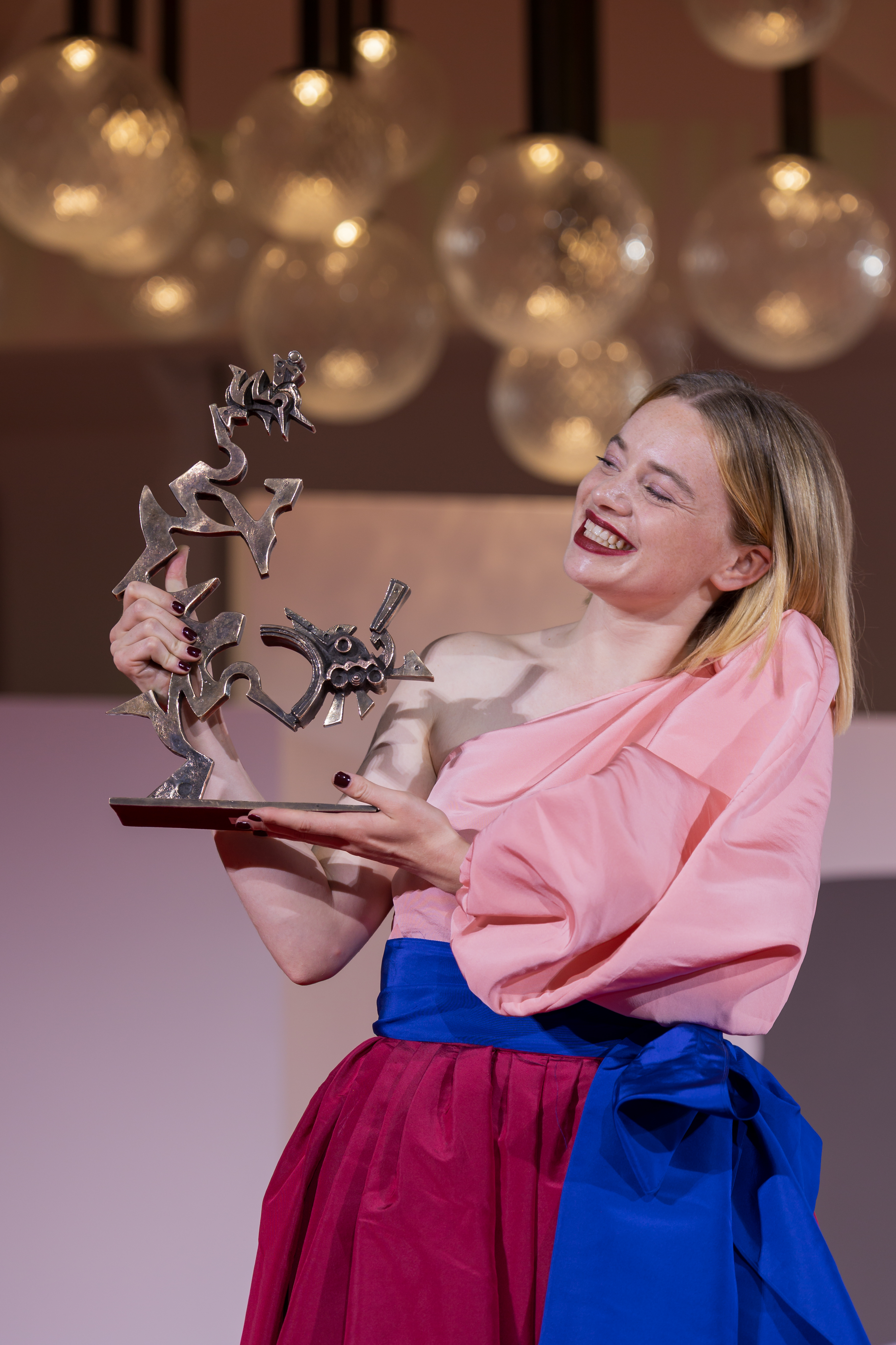
Luna Wedler won for Silent Friend (2025)

=== 1990s ===
Year	Performer(s)	Role(s)	English Title	Original Title
1998	Niccolò Senni	Siddharta	Shooting the Moon	L'albero delle pere
1999	Nina Proll	Jasmin Schmid	Northern Skirts	Nordrand

=== 2000s ===
Year	Performer(s)	Role(s)	English Title	Original Title	Ref.
2000	Megan Burns	Theresa	Liam		
2001	Gael García Bernal	Julio Zapata	Y tu mamá también		
2001	Diego Luna	Tenoch Iturbide	Y tu mamá también		
2002	Moon So-ri	Han Gong-ju	Oasis	오아시스	
2003	Najat Benssallem	Raja	Raja		
2004	Marco Luisi	Pelo	Working Slowly (Radio Alice)	Lavorare con lentezza	
2004	Tommaso Ramenghi	Sgualo	Working Slowly (Radio Alice)	Lavorare con lentezza	
2005	Ménothy Cesar	Legba	Heading South	Vers le sud	
2006	Isild Le Besco	Jeanne	The Untouchable	L'intouchable	
2007	Hafsia Herzi	Rym	The Secret of the Grain	La graine et le mulet	
2008	Jennifer Lawrence	Mariana	The Burning Plain		
2009	Jasmine Trinca	Laura	The Big Dream	Il grande sogno	

=== 2010s ===
Year	Performer(s)	Role(s)	English Title	Original Title	Ref.
2010	Mila Kunis	Lily	Black Swan		
2011	Shota Sometani	Yuichi Sumida	Himizu	ヒミズ	
2011	Fumi Nikaidō	Keiko Shazawa	Himizu	ヒミズ	
2012	Fabrizio Falco	Pipino	Dormant Beauty	Bella addormentata	
2012	Fabrizio Falco	Tancredi Ciraulo	It Was the Son	È stato il figlio	
2013	Tye Sheridan	Gary Jones	Joe		
2014	Romain Paul	Victor	The Last Hammer Blow	Le Dernier Coup de marteau	
2015	Abraham Attah	Agu	Beasts of No Nation		
2016	Paula Beer	Anna	Frantz		
2017	Charlie Plummer	Charley Thompson	Lean on Pete		
2018	Baykali Ganambarr	Billy	The Nightingale		
2019	Toby Wallace	Moses	Babyteeth		

=== 2020s ===
Year	Performer(s)	Role(s)	English Title	Original Title	Ref.
2020	Rouhollah Zamani	Ali	Sun Children	خورشید	
2021	Filippo Scotti	Fabietto Schisa	The Hand of God	È stata la mano di Dio	
2022	Taylor Russell	Maren Yearly	Bones and All		
2023	Seydou Sarr	Seydou	Io capitano		
2024	Paul Kircher	Anthony	And Their Children After Them	Leurs enfants après eux	
2025	Luna Wedler	Grete	Silent Friend	Stille Freundin	
2026	Malou Khebizi	Lucia	A Place to Heal	15/18	
