= Massimo Cristaldi =

Italian film producer (1956–2022)

- Born: 23 March 1956; Rome, Italy
- Died: 8 April 2022 (aged 66); Rome, Italy
- Occupation: Film producer

Massimo Cristaldi (23 March 1956 – 8 April 2022) was an Italian film producer.

== Biography ==
Cristaldi entered the cinematographic industry in 1974 in the company of his father, Franco Cristaldi. In 1983, he became an executive producer of numerous films for 2Vides and Cristaldi Pictures alongside the directors Federico Fellini, Francesco Rosi, Gillo Pontecorvo, and Nanni Loy. In 1992, he took ownership of Cristaldifilm after the death of his father.

Massimo Cristaldi died in Rome on 8 April 2022 at the age of 66.

== Filmography ==
- Passage to Paradise (1998)
- Our Italian Husband (2004)
- Hidden Love (2007)
- Salvo (2013)
- Sicilian Ghost Story (2017)
