= Young Millionaires =

- Jeunes Millionnaires (French)
- Genre: Teen drama; Comedy-drama
- Created by: Igor Gotesman
- Starring: Abraham Wapler; Sara Gançarski; Malou Khebizi; Calixte Broisin-Doutaz; Jeanne Boudier
- Country of origin: France
- Original language: French
- No. of seasons: 1
- No. of episodes: 8

Production
- Production company: Five Dogs

Original release
- Network: Netflix
- Release: August 13, 2025

Young Millionaires (French: Jeunes Millionnaires) is a French teen comedy-drama television series created by Igor Gotesman for Netflix. Set in Marseille, the series follows four 17-year-old friends who win a €17 million lottery jackpot but face legal obstacles and social chaos because they are minors. All eight episodes of the first season were released globally on August 13, 2025.

== Plot ==
On a Friday the 13th in Marseille, four childhood friends—David, Jess, Léo, and Samia—strike a €17 million lottery jackpot. Their initial euphoria quickly dissolves when they discover that, as 17-year-olds, they cannot legally claim the prize. To bypass the rules, they attempt to recruit their teacher, Mr. Pivot, and later classmate Victoire Varrois, who has just turned 18. As they attempt to manage their uncollected fortune, they become entangled in unpaid debts, blackmail, and family drama, all while trying to keep the win a secret from their school and local gangs.

== Cast and characters ==
- Abraham Wapler as David
- Sara Gançarski as Jess
- Malou Khebizi as Samia
- Calixte Broisin-Doutaz as Léo
- Jeanne Boudier as Victoire Varrois
- Florian Lesieur as Tom
- Stéphan Wojtowicz as Mr. Pivot

== Production ==
The series was created by Igor Gotesman, following his previous Netflix successes Family Business and Fiasco. Principal photography took place entirely on location in Marseille and the surrounding Provence-Alpes-Côte d'Azur region between August and mid-October 2024. Specific filming sites included the Lycée Les Calanques and the Camas district.

== Release ==
Young Millionaires was officially unveiled at the Festival de la Fiction TV in La Rochelle before its global premiere on Netflix. All eight episodes were released on August 13, 2025.

== Reception ==
Decider's Joel Keller gave the Netflix series Young Millionaires a "Skip It" rating, citing unlikable protagonists and frustrating, illegal antics rather than comedy.
