= Fabio Grassadonia and Antonio Piazza =

Italian film directors and screenwriters

Fabio Grassadonia
- Born: 8 June 1968 (age 58); Palermo, Italy
- Occupations: Film director; screenwriter
- Years active: 2001–present

Antonio Piazza
- Born: 24 February 1970 (age 56); Milan, Italy
- Occupations: Film director; screenwriter
- Years active: 2001–present

Fabio Grassadonia and Antonio Piazza are an Italian duo of screenwriters and directors.

== Biography ==
Grassadonia and Piazza became friends while attending film school Scuola Holden in Turin. After collaborating to some screenplays, they made their directorial debut in 2009 with Rita, a short which was screened in numerous festivals and won several awards.

Their feature film debut Salvo premiered at the 2013 Cannes Film Festival, where it won the Critics' Week Grand Prize. For this film Grassadonia and Piazza received a David di Donatello nomination for best new directors.

Grassadonia's and Piazza's second film Sicilian Ghost Story opened the Critics' Week at the 2017 Cannes Film Festival, where it received a ten-minute standing ovation. For this film the duo was awarded the David di Donatello for Best Adapted Screenplay.

The duo's third film Sicilian Letters competed for the Golden Lion at the 81st Venice International Film Festival.

== Filmography ==
- Rita (short, 2009)
- Salvo (2013)
- Sicilian Ghost Story (2017)
- Sicilian Letters (2024)
