= Salvo (film) =

- Directed by: Fabio Grassadonia; Antonio Piazza
- Written by: Fabio Grassadonia; Antonio Piazza
- Produced by: Massimo Cristaldi; Fabrizio Mosca
- Starring: Saleh Bakri; Sara Serraiocco
- Cinematography: Daniele Ciprì
- Edited by: Desideria Rayner
- Production companies: Acaba produzioni Cristaldi Pictures; MACT Productions; Cité Films; Arte France Cinéma
- Release dates: May 16, 2013 (Cannes Film Festival); June 27, 2013 (Italy); October 16, 2013 (France)
- Running time: 104 minutes
- Countries: Italy; France
- Language: Italian
- Budget: €1,000,000

Salvo is a 2013 Italian drama film written and directed by Fabio Grassadonia and Antonio Piazza. It won the Critics' Week Grand Prize at the 2013 Cannes Film Festival.

== Cast ==
- Saleh Bakri as Salvo
- Sara Serraiocco as Rita
- Mario Pupella as The Boss
- Giuditta Perriera as Mimma Puleo
- Luigi Lo Cascio as Enzo Puleo

== Reception ==
Salvo has an approval rating of 75% on review aggregator website Rotten Tomatoes, based on 24 reviews, and an average rating of 5.8/10. The website's critical consensus states: "Stylish and inventive, Salvo parcels out the thrills that genre fans seek while anchoring its story with satisfying, slow-building tension". Metacritic assigned the film a weighted average score of 59 out of 100, based on 11 critics, indicating "mixed or average reviews". Italian film critic Paolo Mereghetti described the film as a "symphony in three acts", which "starts as a noir, continues as a poliziottesco and ends as a melodrama".

== See also ==
- List of Italian films of 2013
