= A Place to Heal =

2026 French film by Cédric Kahn

- Theatrical release poster
- Directed by: Cédric Kahn
- Written by: Cédric Kahn; Kahina Le Querrec
- Produced by: Alexandra Henochsberg
- Starring: Zoé Monpart; Malou Khebizi; Kenji Peyran; Patience Munchenbach; Sophie Guillemin
- Cinematography: Patrick Ghiringhelli
- Edited by: Géraldine Mangenot
- Music by: Gael Rakotondrabe
- Production companies: Ad Vitam Films; Tropdebonheur Productions; France 2 Cinéma
- Distributed by: Ad Vitam
- Release dates: 4 September 2026 (Venice); 11 November 2026 (France)
- Running time: 105 minutes
- Country: France
- Language: French

A Place to Heal (French: 15/18) is a 2026 French drama film directed by Cédric Kahn, co-written with Kahina Le Querrec. Starring Zoé Monpart and Malou Khebizi, it follows two French teenage girls admitted into the adolescent psychiatric ward of a public hospital.

The film had its world premiere in the main competition of the 83rd Venice International Film Festival on 4 September 2026, where Khebizi won the Marcello Mastroianni Award. It will be theatrically released in France by Ad Vitam on 11 November.

== Cast ==
- Zoé Monpart as Eloïse
- Malou Khebizi as Lucia
- Kenji Peyran as Enzo
- Patience Munchenbach as Charline
- Sophie Guillemin as Carole
- Cédric Kahn as Étienne
- Raphaël Besson as Ulysse
- Ahleme Sahraoui as Yasmine
- Laeti Vabre as André
- Daoud Gary as Marvin
- Sami Assouane as Zoran
- Ambre Belaïdi as Melissa
- Gabriel Pottier as James
- Maria Cavalier-Bazan as Linda
- Antoine de Foucauld as Jules
- Jennifer Decker as Paola

== Production ==
Produced by Alexandra Henochsberg for Ad Vitam, in co-production with Tropdebonheur Productions and France 2 Cinéma, with the participation of Canal+, Ciné+ OCS, France Télévisions, TV5Monde, Cinéaxe 7, Indéfilms 14, Cofinova 22, Cinéventure 11, and in association with La Région Occitanie.

== Release ==
The film had its world premiere in the main competition of the 83rd Venice International Film Festival on 4 September 2026, where it competed for the Golden Lion. It will be theatrically released in France by Ad Vitam on 11 November.

Charades handles world sales.

== Reception ==
The film was generally well-received by critics. Variety's critic Guy Lodge hailed the film, pairing it to Laurent Cantet's The Class and describing it as "rawly sensitive", "tender but incisive", and possessing a "raw emotional impact". Jordan Mintzer from the Hollywood Reporter noted similarities with Kahn' second work Too Much Happiness and described it as "an engaging work, capturing the subtleties and excesses of teenagers in the throes of depression, bi-polarity and other emotional disorders", yet criticizing how "as a narrative, it never shapes into a powerful enough whole".

IndieWire's critic Miriam Balanescu gave the film an A rating, noting "it treats its characters with an impressive even-handedness, just as it treats its very serious subject matter with the sensitivity and thoughtfulness it demands." Peter Bradshaw from The Guardian called it "a heartfelt and high-minded film" that "combines compassion with coolly detailed forensic scrutiny".
