= 81st Venice International Film Festival =

2024 Italian film festival event

- Official poster by Lorenzo Mattotti
- Opening film: Beetlejuice Beetlejuice
- Closing film: The American Backyard
- Location: Venice, Italy
- Founded: 1932
- Awards: Golden Lion: The Room Next Door
- Hosted by: Sveva Alviti
- Artistic director: Alberto Barbera
- Festival date: 28 August – 7 September 2024
- Website: www.labiennale.org/en/cinema/2024

Venice Film Festival chronology
- 82nd 80th

The 81st annual Venice International Film Festival was held from 28 August to 7 September 2024, at Venice Lido in Italy.

French actress Isabelle Huppert served as Jury President for the main competition. Italian actress and model Sveva Alviti hosted the opening and closing ceremonies. The Golden Lion was awarded to The Room Next Door by Pedro Almodóvar.

Australian filmmaker Peter Weir and American actress Sigourney Weaver received the Golden Lion for Lifetime Achievement during the festival.

The festival opened with Beetlejuice Beetlejuice by Tim Burton, and closed with The American Backyard by Pupi Avati.

== Juries ==
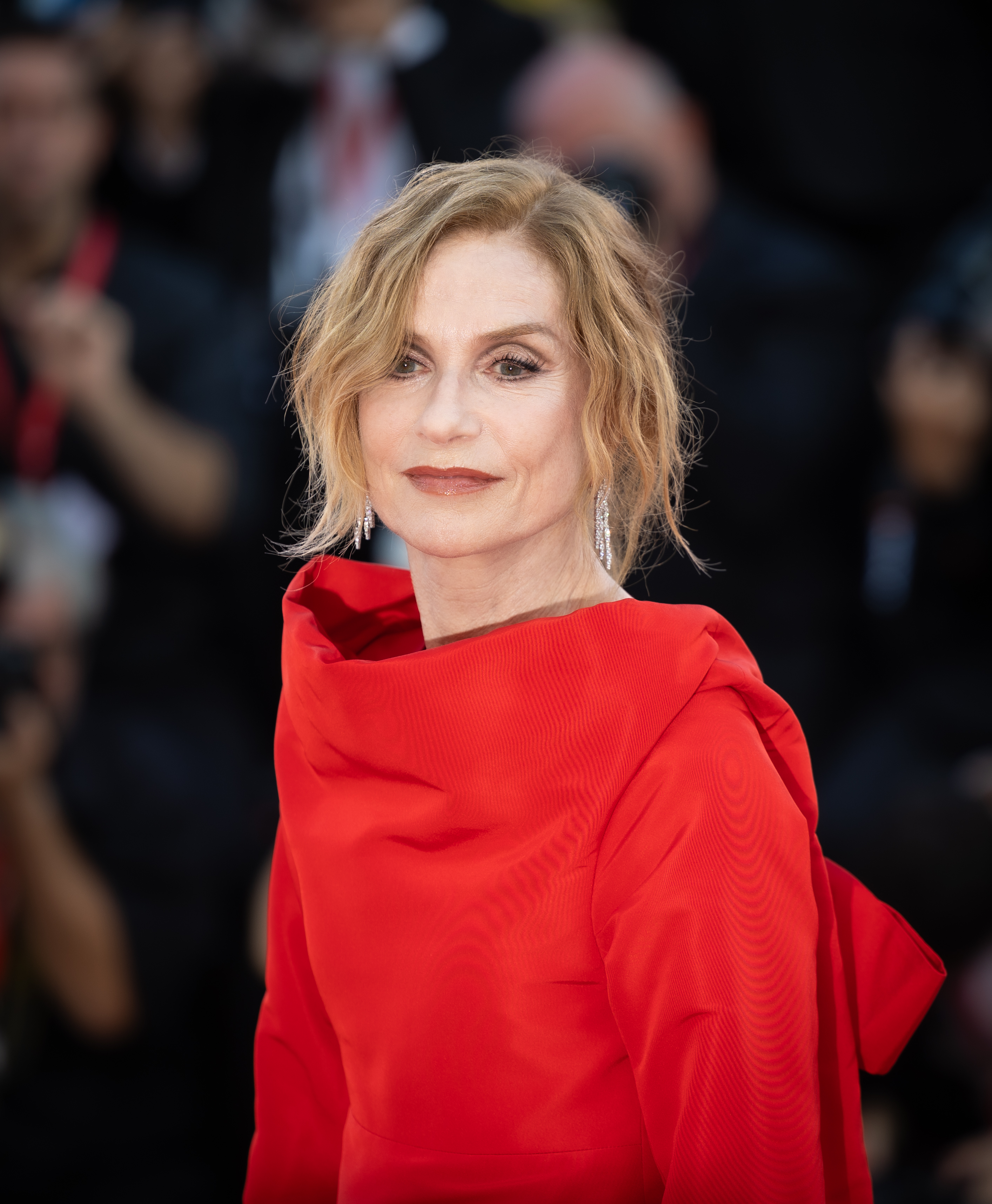
Isabelle Huppert, main competition jury president

=== Main Competition (Venezia 81) ===
- Isabelle Huppert, French actress - Jury President
- James Gray, American filmmaker
- Andrew Haigh, British filmmaker
- Agnieszka Holland, Polish filmmaker
- Kleber Mendonça Filho, Brazilian filmmaker, producer and film critic
- Abderrahmane Sissako, Mauritanian filmmaker
- Giuseppe Tornatore, Italian filmmaker
- Julia von Heinz, German filmmaker
- Zhang Ziyi, Chinese actress

=== Horizons (Orizzonti) ===
- Debra Granik, American filmmaker and cinematographer - Jury President
- Ali Asgari, Iranian filmmaker and producer
- Soudade Kaadan, Syrian filmmaker
- Christos Nikou, Greek filmmaker
- Tuva Novotny, Swedish actress and director
- Gábor Reisz, Hungarian filmmaker
- Valia Santella, Italian filmmaker

=== Luigi de Laurentis Award for Debut Film ===
- Gianni Canova, Italian film critic and Rector of the IULM University of Milan - Jury President
- Ricky D’Ambrose, American filmmaker
- Bárbara Paz, Brazilian actress, filmmaker, visual artist and producer
- Taylor Russell, Canadian actress
- Jacob Wong, Hong-Kong film festival curator and project market director

=== Venice Classics ===
- Renato De Maria, Italian filmmaker - Jury President

=== Venice Immersive ===
- Celine Daemen, Dutch director of transdisciplinary art - Jury President
- Marion Burger, French production designer and director
- Adriaan Lokman, Dutch artist

== Official Selection ==
=== In Competition (Venezia 81) ===
The following films were selected for the main competition:

English Title	Original Title	Director(s)	Production Country
And Their Children After Them	Leurs enfants après eux	Ludovic and Zoran Boukherma	France
April	აპრილი	Dea Kulumbegashvili	Georgia, France, Italy
Babygirl		Halina Reijn	United States
Battlefield	Campo di Battaglia	Gianni Amelio	Italy
The Brutalist		Brady Corbet	United States, United Kingdom, Hungary
Diva Futura		Giulia Steigerwalt	Italy
Harvest		Athina Rachel Tsangari	United Kingdom, Germany, Greece, France, United States
I'm Still Here	Ainda Estou Aqui	Walter Salles	Brazil, France
Joker: Folie à Deux		Todd Phillips	United States
Kill the Jockey	El jockey	Luis Ortega	Argentina, Mexico, Spain, Denmark, United States
Love	Kjærlighet	Dag Johan Haugerud	Norway
Maria		Pablo Larraín	Italy, Germany
The Order		Justin Kurzel	Canada
Queer		Luca Guadagnino	Italy, United States
The Quiet Son	Jouer Avec le Feu	Delphine and Muriel Coulin	France
The Room Next Door	La habitación de al lado	Pedro Almodóvar	Spain
Sicilian Letters	Iddu	Fabio Grassadonia and Antonio Piazza	Italy, France
Stranger Eyes	默视录	Yeo Siew Hua	Singapore, Taiwan, France, United States
Three Friends	Trois Amies	Emmanuel Mouret	France
Vermiglio		Maura Delpero	Italy, France, Belgium
Youth (Homecoming)	青春（归）	Wang Bing	China, France, Luxembourg, Netherlands

=== Out of Competition ===
The following films were selected to be screened out of competition:

English Title	Original Title	Director(s)	Production Country
Fiction
Baby Invasion		Harmony Korine	United States
Beetlejuice Beetlejuice (opening film)		Tim Burton	United States, United Kingdom
Broken Rage		Takeshi Kitano	Japan
Cloud	クラウド	Kiyoshi Kurosawa	Japan
Finalement		Claude Lelouch	France
Horizon: An American Saga – Chapter 1		Kevin Costner	United States
Horizon: An American Saga – Chapter 2		Kevin Costner	United States
The Time It Takes	Il tempo che ci vuole	Francesca Comencini	Italy, France
Maldoror		Fabrice Du Welz	Belgium, France
The American Backyard (closing film)	L'orto americano	Pupi Avati	Italy
Phantosmia		Lav Diaz	Philippines
Wolfs		Jon Watts	United States
Non-Fiction
2073		Asif Kapadia	United Kingdom
Apocalypse in the Tropics	Apocalipse nos Trópicos	Petra Costa	Brazil, United States, Denmark
Bestiari, erbari, lapidari		Massimo d’Anolfi and Martina Parenti	Italy, Switzerland
Israel Palestine on Swedish TV 1958-1989	Israel Palestina pa Svensk TV 1958-1989	Göran Hugo Olsson	Sweden, Finland, Denmark
One to One: John & Yoko		Kevin Macdonald and Sam Rice-Edwards	United Kingdom
Riefenstahl		Andres Veiel	Germany
Russians at War		Anastasia Trofimova	France, Canada
Separated		Errol Morris	United States, Mexico
Songs of Slow Burning Earth	Pisni Zemli, Shcho Povilno	Olha Zhurba	Ukraine, Denmark, Sweden, France
TWST / Things We Said Today		Andrei Ujică	France, Romania
Why War		Amos Gitai	France, Switzerland
Series
Disclaimer (7 episodes)		Alfonso Cuarón	United Kingdom, United States
The New Years (10 episodes)	Los años nuevos	Rodrigo Sorogoyen, Sandra Romero and David Martín de los Santos	Spain
Families like Ours (7 episodes)	Familier Som Vores	Thomas Vinterberg	Denmark, France, Sweden, Czech Republic, Belgium, Norway, Germany
M. Son of the Century (8 episodes)	M. Il figlio del secolo	Joe Wright	Italy, France
Short films
An Urban Allegory	Allégorie Citadine	Alice Rohrwacher and JR	France
May I Say? Chapter Two	Se posso permettermi: Capitolo II	Marco Bellocchio	Italy
Special Screenings
Beauty Is Not a Sin (short)		Nicolas Winding Refn	Italy, Denmark
Leopardi. Il poeta dell'infinito		Sergio Rubini	Italy
Master and Commander: The Far Side of the World (2003)		Peter Weir	United States

=== Orizzonti ===
The following films were selected to the Orizzonti main competition:

English Title	Original Title	Director(s)	Production Country
Aïcha		Mehdi Barsaoui	Tunisia, France, Italy, Saudi Arabia, Qatar
Carissa		Jason Jacobs and Delmar Devon	South Africa
Diciannove		Giovanni Tortorici	Italy, United Kingdom
Familia		Francesco Costabile	Italy
Familiar Touch		Sarah Friedland	United States
Feeling Better (opening film)	Nonostante	Valerio Mastandrea	Italy
Happyend		Neo Sora	Japan, United States
Happy Holidays	ينعاد عليكو	Scandar Copti	Palestine, France, Germany, Italy, Qatar
Marco, the Invented Truth	Marco	Jon Garaño and Aitor Arregi	Spain
Mistress Dispeller	以爱之名	Elizabeth Lo	China, United States
My Everything	Mon Inséparable	Anne-Sophie Bailly	France
The New Year That Never Came	Anul Nou care n-a fost	Bogdan Mureșanu	Romania, Serbia
Of Dogs and Men	Al Klavim Veanashim	Dani Rosenberg	Israel, Italy
One of Those Days When Hemme Dies	Hemme’nin Öldügü Günlerden Biri	Murat Fıratoğlu	Turkey
Pavements		Alex Ross Perry	United States
Pooja, Sir		Deepak Rauniyar	Nepal, United States, Norway
Quiet Life		Alexandros Avranas	France, Germany, Sweden, Greece, Estonia, Finland
The Ties That Bind Us	L’Attachement	Carine Tardieu	France, Belgium
Wishing on a Star		Peter Kerekes	Italy, Croatia, Austria, Slovakia, Czech Republic

=== Orizzonti Extra ===
The following films were selected to the Orizzonti Extra section:

English Title	Original Title	Director(s)	Production Country
After Party		Vojtĕch Strakatý	Czech Republic
Edge of Night	Gecenin Kıyısı	Türker Süer	Germany, Turkey
King Ivory		John Swab	United States
The Mohican	Le Mohican	Frédéric Farrucci	France
Seeking Haven for Mr. Rambo	Al Bahs an Manfaz i Khoroug al Sayed Rambo	Khaled Mansour	Egypt, Saudi Arabia
September 5 (opening film)		Tim Fehlbaum	Germany
The Story of Frank and Nina	La storia del Frank e della Nina	Paola Randi	Italy, Sweden
Vittoria		Alessandro Cassigoli and Casey Kauffman	Italy
The Witness	Shahed	Nader Saeivar	Germany, Austria

=== Orizzonti Short Films International Competition ===
The following films were selected to compete for the Orizzonti Award for Best Short Film, assigned by the Jury of the Orizzonti section:

English Title	Original Title	Director(s)	Production Country
Ajar	Nime Baz, Nime Basteh	Atefeh Jalali	Iran
Almost Certainly False	Neredeyse Kesínlíkle Yanlis	Cansu Baydar	Turkey
Il Burattino e la Balena		Roberto Catani	France, Italy
James		Andres Rodríguez	Guatemala, Mexico
Marion		Joe Weiland and Finn Constantine	France, United Kingdom
Moon Lake		Jeannie Sui Wonders	United States
My Mother is a Cow	Minha Mãe é uma Vaca	Moara Passoni	Brazil
O		Rúnar Rúnarsson	Icelend, Sweden
The Poison Cat	毒药猫	Tian Guan	China
René Va Alla Guerra		Mariachiara Pernisa, Luca Ferri and Morgan Menegazzo	Italy, Slovenia
Shadows		Rand Beiruty	France, Jordan
Three Keenings		Oliver McGoldrick	United Kingdom, Ireland, United States
Who Loves the Sun		Arshia Shakiba	Canada
Out of Competition
F II - Lo Stupore del Mondo		Alessandro Rak	Italy

=== Venice Classics ===
Venice Classics is the section that since 2012 has presented world premiere screenings at the Venice Film Festival of restorations of film classics carried out over the past year by film archives, cultural institutions and production companies around the world. The section usually also presents a selection of documentaries about cinema. Director and screenwriter Renato De Maria will chair the Jury of Film Students which – for the eleventh year – will award the Venice Classics prizes for the respective competitions for Best Restored Film and for the Best Documentary About Cinema. The Jury chaired will be composed of 24 students. The following films were selected to the Venice Classics section:

English Title	Original Title	Director(s)	Production Country	Restored By
Restored Films
The Big Heat (1953)		Fritz Lang	United States	Sony Pictures Entertainment
Bend of the River (1952)		Anthony Mann	United States	Universal Pictures / The Film Foundation
Blood and Sand (1941)		Rouben Mamoulian	United States	Walt Disney Studios / The Film Foundation
Ecce Bombo (1978)		Nanni Moretti	Italy	Centro Sperimentale di Cinematografia
Forbidden Games (1952)	Jeux Interdits	René Clément	France	StudioCanal
Ghatashraddha (1977)		Girish Kasaravalli	India	The Film Foundation
Goldflakes (1976)	Les Flocons d'or	Werner Schroeter	West Germany, France	Filmmuseum Düsseldorf / Filmmuseum München
The Gold of Naples (1954)	L'Oro di Napoli	Vittorio de Sica	Italy	Cinecittà / Filmauro
His Girl Friday (1940)		Howard Hawks	United States	Sony Pictures Entertainment
The Hour and Turn of Augusto Matraga (1965)	A Hora e a Vez de Augusto Matraga	Roberto Santos	Brazil	LC Barreto Produções Cinematográficas
Manji (1964)	卍	Yasuzô Masumura	Japan	Kadokawa Corporation
The Man Who Left His Will on Film (1970)	東京戦争戦後秘話	Nagisa Ôshima	Japan	Oshima Productions LTD
Model (1980)		Frederick Wiseman	United States	Zipporah Films
La Notte (1961)		Michelangelo Antonioni	Italy, France	Centro Sperimentale di Cinematografia
The Mahabharata (1989)		Peter Brook	France, United Kingdom, United States	Brook Productions
The Soft Skin (1964)	La Peau Douce	François Truffaut	France	mk2 Films
Swept Away... by an Unusual Destiny in the Blue Sea of August (1974)	Travolti da un Insolito Destino Nell'azzurro Mare d'Agosto	Lina Wertmüller	Italy	Fondazione Cineteca di Bologna / Minerva Pictures
Pusher (1996)		Nicolas Winding Refn	Denmark	byNWR
Documentaries about Cinema
Carlo Mazzacurati - Una Certa Idea di Cinema		Enzo Monteleone and Mario Canale	Italy	
Chain Reactions		Alexander Philippe	United States	
Constel·Lació Portabella		Claudio Zulian	Spain	
Le Cinéma de Jean-Pierre Léaud		Cyril Leuthy	France	
From Darkness to Light		Michael Lurie and Eric Friedler	United States, Germany	
“I Will Revenge This World with Love” Sergej Paradjanov		Zara Jian	Armenia, France	
Maroun Returns to Beirut	Wa Ada Maroun Ila Beirut	Feyrouz Serhal	Qatar, Lebanon	
Miyazaki, Spirit of Nature	Miyazaki, L'Esprit de la Nature	Léo Favier	France	
Volonté - L’Uomo dai Mille Volti		Francesco Zippel	Italy	

=== Venice Immersive ===
The Venice Immersive is entirely devoted to immersive media and includes all XR means of creative expression, from 360° videos to XR works of any length, including installations and virtual worlds. The following projects were selected for the XR - Extended Reality section of La Biennale di Venezia:

==== In Competition ====
English Title	Original Title	Director(s)	Production Country
Address Unknown: Fukushima Now	住所不明：福島今	Arif Khan	Japan, United States, Taiwan
All I Know About Teacher Li		Zhuzmo	United States
The Art of Change		Simone Fougnier and Vincent Rooijers	Italy, Netherlands, United States
A Simple Silence		Craig Quintero	Taiwan
Bodies of Water	Une Eau la Nuit	Chélanie Beaudin-Quintin and Caroline Laurin-Beaucage	Canada
Ceci est Mon Coeur		Stéphane Hueber-Blies and Nicolas Blies	Luxembourg, Canada, France
Champ de Bataille		François Vautier	France, Belgium, Luxembourg
Fragile Home	Křehký domov	Ondrej Moravec and Victoria Lopukhina	Czech Republic
Free ur Head	放開你的頭腦	Tung-Yen Chou	Taiwan
The Guardians of Jade Mountain	玉山守護者	Hayoun Kwon	France, Taiwan
Impulse: Playing with Reality		Barry Gene Murphy and May Abdalla	United Kingdom, France
In the Realm of Ripley		Soo Eung Chuck Chae, Eun Jung Chae	South Korea
Ito Meikyu		Boris Labbé	France, Luxembourg
Mamie Lou		Isabelle Andreani	France, Luxembourg
Mammary Mountain		Tara Baoth Mooney, Camille C. Baker and Maf'j Alvarez	United Kingdom, Ireland
Mobile Suit Gundam: Silver Phantom	機動戦士ガンダム 銀灰の幻影	Kenichi Suzuki	Japan, France, United States
Oto's Planet		Gwenael François	Luxembourg, Canada, France
Play Life	Žaisti Gyvenima	Zilvinas Naujokas, Vilius Petrauskas, Mantas Pronckus, Donatas Ulvydas, Algis Krisciunas and Darius Zickus	Lithuania
Project: Lost Worlds		Fins	United States
Project_Y: Working Title		Yuzo Sugano, Shingo Yoshimura, Toshiki Sakamoto and Taro Hirai	Japan
Pudica		Keisuke Itoh	Japan
Rencontres	漫步源雨㵵	Mathieu Pradat	France, Taiwan
Strangeways		Adam Lieber and Chris Bianchi	United Kingdom, South Africa, Malta
Symbiosis /\ Dybiosis: Sentience		Tosca Terán, Brenda Lehman, Andrei Gravelle and Sven Steffens	Canada, Germany, Chile
Uncanny Alley: A New Day		Stephen Buchko and Rick Treweek	United States, South Africa
Un Soir Avec les Impressionnistes, Paris 1874		Pierre Gable	France

==== Out of Competition ====
The out of competition slot of Venice Immersive presents an international selection of works that have been released or premiered elsewhere since the last edition of the Venice International Film Festival:

English Title	Original Title	Director(s)	Production Country
Best of Experiences
Turbulence: Jamais Vu		Ben Joseph Andrews, Emma Roberts	Australia
What If...? - An Immersive Story		Dave Bushore	United States
40 Days Without the Sun	40 Dias Sem o Sol	Joao Furia	Brazil
Nightmara: Episode 3		Gianpaolo Gonzalez	United States
Astra		Eliza McNitt	France, United States
Adventure		Charlotte Mikkelborg, Elliot Graves	United Kingdom
Riven		Rand Miller, Richard Vander Wende, Hannah Gamiel, Eric Anderson, Tony Fryman	United States
Museum Alive Immersive with David Attenborough		Bhaumik Patel	United Kingdom
Telos I		Emil Dam Seidel, Dorotea Saykaly	Canada, Sweden, Denmark, United Kingdom
The 7th Guest VR		Paul van der Meer	The Netherlands
Best of Worlds
․/ Complication		Ende	—N/a
Chromatic Frequency		Axinovium	—N/a
Concrete - Pale Sands		May ~ and jerk	—N/a
Eccentic Rooms		suzuki_i	—N/a
Endless Residents Super Ultra Deluxe Edition		Spencer Filson	—N/a
Exoplanet Journey		Niko	—N/a
Finishing Tough - Art Studio & Gallery		Mixie!	—N/a
Like a Canvas		haruki_haru	—N/a
Liminal Dreams: The Poolrooms		∗Lotus∗	—N/a
Magic AI-Art: Dimensions		Niko∗	—N/a
Magnetizse		Juice...	—N/a
Mormoverse: Under the Pillow		GeorgyMolodtsov	—N/a
Overview Effect Experience		The Shushu	—N/a
Phatta		Sumeru	—N/a
Polyrhythm		SkyeSage	—N/a
Sanctum		Muzz, ju.no	—N/a
Smew Brush!		Smew	—N/a
Sanctum		Muzz, ju.no	—N/a
SNR Labs: Test Facility		A://DDOS	—N/a
Suku		durk@work	—N/a
VRC Museum		Ectique	—N/a
Biennale College Cinema Immersive
Bellow Deck		Martina Mahlknecht and Martin Prinoth	Germany, Italy
Duchampiana		Lilian Hess	France, Germany
Earths to Come		Rose Bond	United States
Echoes of Ash Valley		Shu Zhu	United States
Garden Alchemy		Michelle Kranot and Uri Kranot	Denmark
The Gossips's Chronicles		Corinne Mazzoli	Italy
Somewhere Unknown in Indochina	中南半島未知某處	Asio Chihsiung Liu and Feng Ting Tsou	Taiwan, Belgium, Canada, Vietnam, Cambodia

=== Biennale College - Cinema ===
The following films were selected for the Biennale College - Cinema section.

English Title	Original Title	Director(s)	Production Country
The Fisherman		Zoey Martinson	Ghana
Honeymoon	Medovyi Misiats	Zhanna Ozirna	Ukraine
Január 2		Zsófia Szilágyi	Hungary
My Birthday	Il mio compleanno	Christian Filippi	Italy

=== Final Cut in Venice ===
Final Cut in Venice is the festival program that has been providing since 2013 support in the completion of films from African and Middle East countries. The following seven work-in-progress films have been selected for the 12th edition of Final Cut in Venice:

English Title	Original Title	Director(s)	Production Country
Fiction
Aisha Can't Fly Away	Aisha la tastaea al tayran	Morad Mostafa	Egypt, Tunisia, Saudi Arabia, Qatar, France
In This Darkness I See You		Nadim Tabet	Lebanon, France, Qatar, Saudi Arabia
My Father’s Scent		Mohamed Siam	Egypt, Norway, Saudi Arabia, Qatar, France
The Prophet	O Profeta	Ique Langa	Mozambique, South Africa
Docufiction
Ancestral Visions of the Future		Lemohang Jeremiah Mosese	France, Germany, Lesotho
Your Daughter		Sara Shazli	Egypt
Documentary
Those Who Watch Over	Ceux qui veillent	Karima Saidi	Belgium, France, Qatar

== Independent Sections ==
=== Giornate degli Autori ===
The first two screenings of Rusudan Glurjidze's The Antique were cancelled following an emergency decree issued by the Court of Venice over a copyright dispute. The remaining screening took place after the section submitted a counterclaim and the court authorized the screening. The following films were selected to be screened in Giornate degli Autori:

English Title	Original Title	Director(s)	Production Country
In Competition
Alpha.		Jan-Willem Van Ewijk	Netherlands
The Antique	Antikvariati	Rusudan Glurjidze	Georgia
The Book of Joy	Selon Joy	Camille Lugan	France
Boomerang		Shahab Fotouhi	Germany, Iran
Manas		Marianna Brennand	Brazil, Portugal, Belgium
Sanatorium Under the Sign of the Hourglass		Stephen Quay and Timothy Quay	United Kingdom
Sugar Island		Johanné Gómez Terrero	Dominican Republic
Super Happy Forever		Kohei Igarashi	Japan
Taxi Monamour		Ciro De Caro	Italy
To Kill a Mongolian Horse	一匹白马的热梦	Jiang Xiaoxuan	Malaysia, Hong Kong, South Korea, Japan, United States
Out of Competition - Special Events
Basileia (closing film)		Isabella Torre	Italy
Kora		Cláudia Varejão	Brazil
The Open Couple (opening film)	Coppia Aperta Quasi Spalancata	Federica Di Giacomo	Italy
Peaches Goes Bananas		Marie Losier	France, Belgium
Possibility of Paradise	Mogucnost Raja	Mladen Kovačević	Serbia
Soul of the Desert	Alma del Desierto	Mónica Taboada-Tapia	Colombia, Brazil
Sudan, Remember Us	السودان يا غالي	Hind Meddeb	France, Tunisia, Qatar, Italy
Miu Miu Women's Tales
#27 I Am the Beauty of Your Beauty, I Am the fear of Your Fear		Tan Chui Mui	Malaysia, Italy
#28 The Miu Miu Affaire		Laura Citarella	Argentina
Venice Nights (Notti Veneziane)
A Man Fell		Giovanni C. Lorusso	Italy
Bosco Grande		Giuseppe Schillaci	France
Desert Suite		Fabrizio Ferraro	Italy
The Eye of the Hen	L’Occhio Della Gallina	Antonietta De Lillo	Italy
High Stakes – A Night in the Ward	La Scommessa – Una Notte in Corsia	Giovanni Dota	Italy
Hold on Miss! Isabella Ducrot Unlimited	Tenga Duro Signorina! Isabella Ducrot Unlimited	Monica Stambrini	Italy
Quasi a Casa		Carolina Pavone	Italy
Sempre		Luciana Fina	Portugal
Vakhim		Francesca Pirani	Italy

=== 39. Settimana Internazionale della Critica ===
The selection is curated by the General Delegate of the Venice Critics’ Week Beatrice Fiorentino together with the members of the selection committee: Enrico Azzano, Chiara Borroni, Ilaria Feole and Federico Pedroni. The following films were selected to the International Critics’ Week sections:

English Title	Original Title	Director(s)	Production Country
In Competition
Anywhere Anytime		Milad Tangshir	Italy
Don't Cry, Butterfly	Mưa trên cánh bướm	Dương Diệu Linh	Vietnam, Singapore, Philippines, Indonesia
Homegrown		Michael Premo	United States
No Sleep Till		Alexandra Simpson	United States, Switzerland
Paul & Paulette Take a Bath		Jethro Massey	United Kingdom
Peacock	Pfau – Bin ich echt?	Bernhard Wenger	Austria, Germany
Perfumed With Mint	Moattar binanaa	Muhammed Hamdy	Egypt, France, Tunisia
Out of Competition - Special Events
Planet B (opening film)	Planète B	Aude Léa Rapin	France, Belgium
Little Jaffna (closing film)		Lawrence Valin	France

==== SIC@SIC Short Italian Cinema ====
English Title	Original Title	Director(s)	Production Country
In Competition
At Least I Will Be 8 294 400 Pixel		Marco Talarico	Italy
Black Silver	Nero argento	Francesco Manzato	Italy
Cowboy Billi	Billi il cowboy	Fede Gianni	Italy
Phantom		Gabriele Manzoni	Italy
Playing God		Matteo Burani	Italy, France
Sans Dieu		Alessandro Rocca	Italy
Things That My Best Friend Lost		Marta Innocenti	Italy
Out of Competition - Special Events
Dark Globe (opening film)		Donato Sansone	Italy, France
The Eggregores’ Theory (opening film)		Andrea Gatopoulos	Italy
Sunday Night (closing film)	Domenica sera	Matteo Tortone	Italy

== Official Awards ==
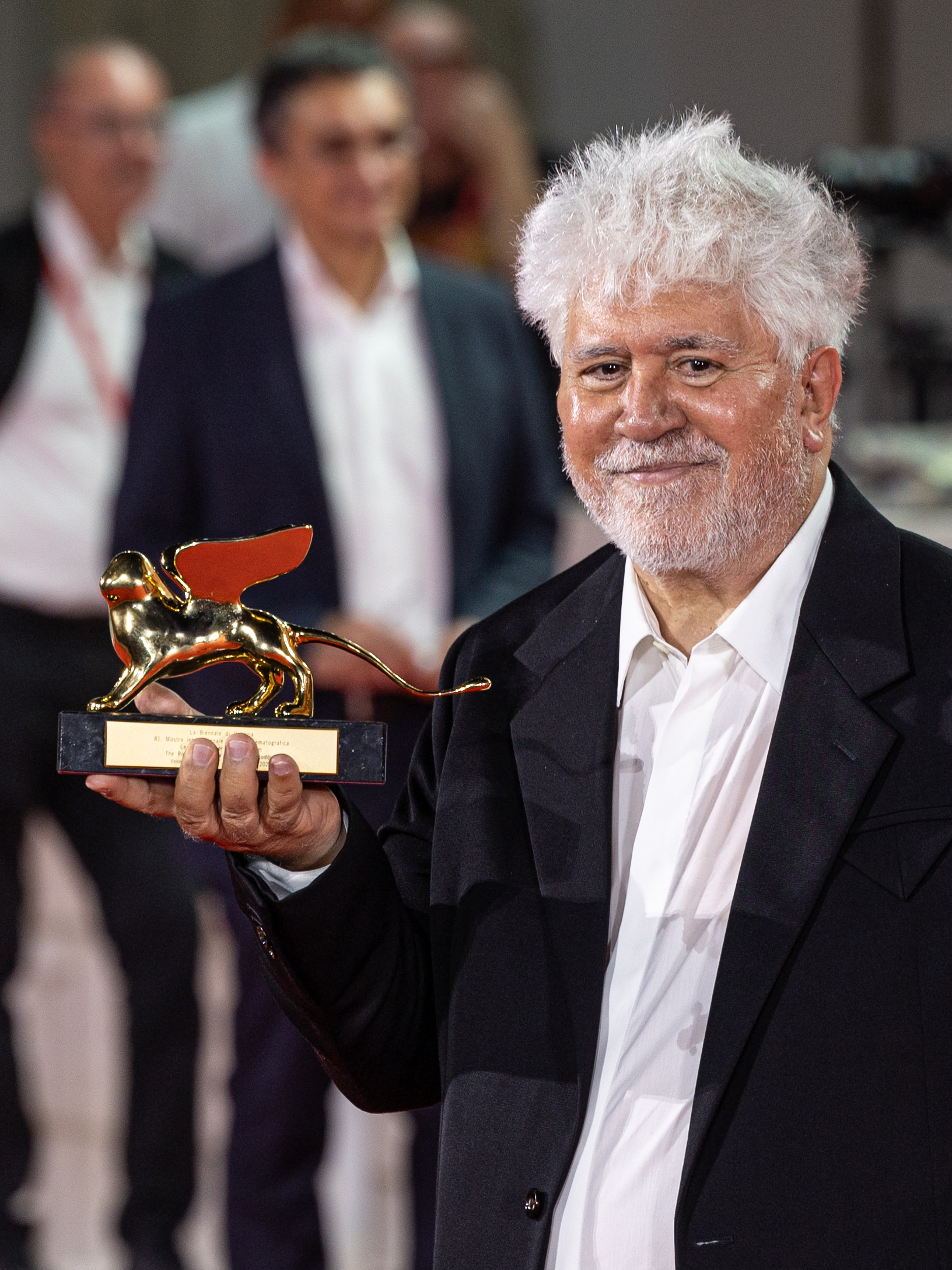
Spanish filmmaker Pedro Almodovar, Golden Lion winner for The Room Next Door

=== Main Competition (Venezia 81) ===
- Golden Lion: The Room Next Door by Pedro Almodóvar
- Grand Jury Prize: Vermiglio by Maura Delpero
- Special Jury Prize: April by Dea Kulumbegashvili
- Silver Lion: Brady Corbet for The Brutalist
- Volpi Cup for Best Actress: Nicole Kidman for Babygirl
- Volpi Cup for Best Actor: Vincent Lindon for The Quiet Son
- Best Screenplay: Murilo Hauser and Heitor Lorega for I'm Still Here
- Marcello Mastroianni Award: Paul Kircher for And Their Children After Them

=== Golden Lion for Lifetime Achievement ===
- Peter Weir
- Sigourney Weaver

=== Orizzonti ===
- Best Film: The New Year That Never Came by Bogdan Mureșanu
- Best Director: Sarah Friedland for Familiar Touch
- Special Jury Prize: One of Those Days When Hemme Dies by Murat Fıratoğlu
- Best Actress: Kathleen Chalfant for Familiar Touch
- Best Actor: Francesco Gheghi for Familia
- Best Screenplay: Scandar Copti for Happy Holidays
- Best Short Film: Who Loves the Sun by Arshia Shakiba

=== Orizzonti Extra ===
- Audience Award: The Witness by Nader Saeivar

=== Lion of the Future ===
- Luigi De Laurentis Award for a Debut Film: Familiar Touch by Sarah Friedland

=== Venice Classics ===
- Best Documentary on Cinema: Chain Reactions by Alexander Philippe
- Best Restored Film: Ecce Bombo (1978) by Nanni Moretti, restored by Centro Sperimentale di Cinematografia

=== Venice Immersive ===
- Grand Prize: Ito Meikyu by Boris Labbé
- Special Jury Prize: Oto's Planet by Gwenael François
- Achievement Prize: Impulse: Playing with Reality by Barry Gene Murphy and May Abdalla

=== Glory to the Filmmaker Award ===
- Claude Lelouch

== Independent Awards ==
=== Venice International Critics' Week ===
- IWONDERFULL Grand Prize: Don't Cry, Butterfly by Dương Diệu Linh
  - IWONDERFULL Grand Prize - Jury Special Mention: No Sleep Till by Alexandra Simpson
- The Film Club Audience award: Paul & Paulette Take a Bath by Jethro Massey
- Luciano Sovena Award for Best Independent Production: Anywhere Anytime by Milad Tangshir
- Verona Film Club Award for Most Innovative Film: Don't Cry, Butterfly by Dương Diệu Linh
- Mario Serandrei – Hotel Saturnia Award for Best Technical Contribution: Homegrown by Michael Premo
- Best Short Film Award: Things That My Best Friend Lost by Marta Innocenti
- Best Director Award: Nero Argento by Francesco Manzato
- Fondazione Fare Cinema Best Technical Contribution Award: At Least I Will Be 8 294 400 Pixel by Marco Talarico

=== Giornate degli Autori ===
- GdA Director's Award: Manas by Marianna Brennand Fortes
- Europa Cinemas Label Award: Alpha. by Jan-Willem van Ewijk
- Andrea Purgatori SIAE Career Award: Alice Rohrwacher
- SIAE Creative Talent Award: Federica Di Giacomo

=== Queer Lion ===
- Soul of the Desert by Mónica Taboada-Tapia

=== Ambassador of Hope Award ===
- King Ivory by John Swab

=== ARCA CinemaGiovani Award ===
- Best Film of Venezia 81: The Brutalist by Brady Corbet
- Best Italian Film in Venice: Vittoria by Alessandro Cassigoli and Casey Kauffman

=== Authors Under 40 Award ===
- Best Directing and Screenwriting: Jiang Xiaoxuan for To Kill a Mongolian Horse
- Best Directing: (ex aequo)
  - Anne-Sophie Bailly for Mon Inséparable
  - Elizabeth Lo for Mistress Dispeller
- Special Mention for Best Cinematography: Boróka Biró for The New Year That Never Came

=== Brian Award ===
- The Room Next Door by Pedro Almodóvar

=== Casa Wabi - Mantarraya Award ===
- Familiar Touch by Sarah Friedland

=== CICT - UNESCO Enrico Fulchignoni Award ===
- The Fisherman by Zoey Martinson

=== Cinema & Arts Award ===
- Golden Musa: Riefenstahl by Andres Veiel
- Golden Musa: Paul & Paulette Take a Bath by Jethro Massey
  - Special Mention Dedicated to a Multidisciplinary Artist': Brothers Quay

=== Premio CinemaSarà ===
- The Brutalist by Brady Corbet
  - Special Mention: Kill the Jockey by Luis Ortega

=== Edipo Re Award ===
- Kill the Jockey by Luis Ortega
  - Special Mention: Sugar Island by Johanné Gómez Terrero
- Ca' Foscari Young Jury Award: Sugar Island by Johanné Gómez Terrero

=== Premio Fondazione Fai Persona Lavoro Ambiente ===
- Peacock by Bernhard Wenger
  - Special Mention:
    - Sugar Island by Johanné Gómez Terrero (treatment of issues related to work)
    - Anywhere Anytime by Milad Tangshir (treatment of issues related to work)
    - The Mohican by Frédéric Farrucci (treatment of issues related to social environment)

=== Fanheart3 Award ===
- Graffetta d'Oro for Best Film: Beetlejuice Beetlejuice by Tim Burton
- Nave d'Argento for Best OTP: The characters of Wolfs by Jon Watts
- XR Fan Experience: Uncanny Alley: A New Day by Stephen Buchko and Rick Treweek
  - XR Special Mention: Nightmara: Episode 3 by Gianpaolo Gonzalez

=== FEDIC Award ===
- Vittoria by Alessandro Cassigoli and Casey Kauffman
  - Special Mention for Best Film: Familia by Francesco Costabile
  - Special Mention for Best Short Film: Playing God by Matteo Burani

=== FIPRESCI Awards ===
- Best Film from Venezia 81: The Brutalist by Brady Corbet
- Best Film from Orizzonti and parallel sections: The New Year That Never Came by Bogdan Mureşanu

=== Francesco Pasinetti Award ===
- Sicilian Letters by Fabio Grassadonia and Antonio Piazza
- Best Actress: Romana Maggiora Vergano for The Time It Takes
  - Special Mention: The cast of Familia (Francesco Gheghi, Barbara Ronchi, Francesco Di Leva and Marco Cicalese)

=== Green Drop Award ===
- Vermiglio by Maura Delpero
- I'm Still Here by Walter Salles

=== ImpACT Award ===
- The Quiet Son by Delphine and Muriel Coulin

=== Interfilm Award ===
- Quiet Life by Alexandros Avranas

=== Lanterna Magica Award ===
- The Story of Frank and Nina by Paola Randi

=== Leoncino d'Oro Award ===
- The Quiet Son by Delphine and Muriel Coulin
- Cinema for UNICEF: Familia by Francesco Costabile

=== Lizzani Award ===
- Sicilian Letters by Fabio Grassadonia and Antonio Piazza

=== NETPAC Award ===
- Mistress Dispeller by Elizabeth Lo

=== NUOVOIMAIE Talent Awards ===
- Best New Young Actress: Tecla Insolia for Familia
- Best New Young Actress: Martina Scrinzi for Vermiglio

=== La Pellicola d'Oro Award ===
- Best Costume Designer: Antonella Bachini for Battlefield
- Best Chief Electrician: Kristian De Martiis for Vermiglio
- Best Prop Maker: Italo Maurizi for Sicilian Letters

=== Premio Speciale Film Impresa ===
- Anne-Sophie Bailly for Mon Inséparable

=== RB Casting Award ===
- Francesco Gheghi for Familia

=== SIGNIS Award ===
- I'm Still Here by Walter Salles

=== "Sorriso Diverso Venezia Award" XI Edition ===
- Best Italian Film: Vermiglio by Maura Delpero
- Best Foreign Film: Mon Inséparable by Anne-Sophie Bailly

=== Premio Soundtrack Stars Award ===
- Best Soundtrack: Hildur Guðnadóttir for Joker: Folie à Deux
- Best Soundtrack: Colapesce for Sicilian Letters
  - Special Mention:
    - Fabio Massimo Capogrosso for The Time It Takes
    - CAM Sugar for the restoration of Swept Away... by an Unusual Destiny in the Blue Sea of August

=== UNIMED Award ===
- Prize for Cultural Diversity: The Brutalist by Brady Corbet
