= Paul & Paulette Take a Bath =

2024 comedy film

- Directed by: Jethro Massey
- Written by: Jethro Massey
- Produced by: Jethro Massey
- Starring: Marie Benati; Jérémie Galiana; Fanny Cottençon
- Cinematography: Ole Marius Dahl; Isarr Eiriksson
- Edited by: Julien Chardon
- Music by: Marc Tassell
- Distributed by: Conic Films
- Release date: September 4, 2024 (Venice)
- Running time: 109 minutes
- Country: United Kingdom
- Language: English

Paul & Paulette Take a Bath is a 2024 British romantic comedy film written and directed by Jethro Massey, in his feature film debut. It premiered at the 81st edition of the Venice Film Festival, in the Critic's Week sidebar, in which it won the Audience Award.

== Cast ==
- Marie Benati as Paulette
- Jérémie Galiana as Paul
- Fanny Cottençon as Charlotte
- Gilles Graveleau as Gilles
- Laurence Vaissiere as Valérie
- Margot Joseph as Margerita
- James Gerard as George
- Marc Tassell as Self
- Laura Bourdeau as Juliette
- Natasha Cashman as Solène
- Isham Conrath as Alex
- Ralf Legat as Walter
