= Anywhere Anytime =

2024 Italian film by Milad Tangshir

- Italian theatrical release poster
- Directed by: Milad Tangshir
- Written by: Giaime Alonge; Daniele Gaglianone; Milad Tangshir
- Produced by: Marta Donzelli; Gregorio Paonessa; Roberto De Paolis; Carla Altieri
- Starring: Ibrahima Sambou; Moussa Dicko Diango; Success Edemakhiota
- Cinematography: Giuseppe Maio
- Edited by: Enrico Giovannone
- Production companies: Vivo Film; Young Films
- Distributed by: Fandango
- Release dates: 1 September 2024 (Venice); 11 September 2024 (Italy)
- Running time: 80 minutes
- Country: Italy
- Languages: Italian; Wolof

Anywhere Anytime is a 2024 Italian coming-of-age drama film directed by Milad Tangshir in his feature directorial debut. It premiered at the 81st Venice International Film Festival on 1 September 2024 and received a theatrical release in Italy on 11 September 2024.

== Premise ==
Issa is an undocumented immigrant from Senegal living in Turin. On his first day as a food delivery cyclist, his bicycle is stolen, and he desperately treks through the city to find it.

== Cast ==
- Ibrahima Sambou as Issa
- Moussa Dicko Diango as Mario
- Success Edemakhiota as Awa

== Production ==
Described as a "modern Turinese version of Bicycle Thieves", the film was shot in Turin over five weeks in the summer of 2023. The main roles are played by non-professional actors.

== Release ==
Fandango acquired the distribution rights to the film on 28 August 2024. The film premiered at the 81st Venice International Film Festival on 1 September 2024 as part of the Settimana Internazionale della Critica. It was also screened at the 2024 Toronto International Film Festival.

== Reception ==
Siddhant Adlakha of Variety wrote, "With quiet, lengthy stretches interspersed with popular African and Middle Eastern songs, Anywhere Anytime creates a soundtrack to immigrant labor, with space for thought, anxiety and reflection broken up by vivid cultural memories. This is perhaps the movie's most unique aesthetic flourish, though perhaps its only notable one. It's never ugly to look at — Giuseppe Maio’s cinematography makes Turin feel as vivid and alive as any of the movie's characters — though it doesn’t necessarily innovate beyond this acoustic showcase, the way Bicycle Thieves left an impression with its novel naturalism."

Jonathan Holland of Screen Daily called the film "a truly worthy successor of, and not just a homage to, the [Vittorio] de Sica classic that is always looking over its shoulder".

Writing for The Asian Cut, Paul Enicola commended the director for drawing "inspiration from the Neorealist movement both in Italian and Iranian cinema," likening Tangshir's direction to that of Abbas Kiarostami and Majid Majidi. Ultimately, Enicola adds, "Anywhere Anytime manages to explore the sense of fear and constant anxiety of those who, like Issa, live in the cracks of society – largely invisible and extremely vulnerable."

== See also ==
- List of films about bicycles and cycling
