= Sicilian Ghost Story =

2017 film

- Film poster
- Directed by: Fabio Grassadonia; Antonio Piazza
- Written by: Fabio Grassadonia; Antonio Piazza
- Release dates: 18 May 2017 (Cannes); 18 May 2017 (Italy)
- Running time: 122 minutes
- Country: Italy
- Language: Italian

Sicilian Ghost Story is a 2017 Italian drama film directed by Fabio Grassadonia and Antonio Piazza. It is based on the short story "The White Knight" published in We Won't Be Confused Forever by Marco Mancassola and was screened in the Critics' Week section at the 2017 Cannes Film Festival.

== Plot ==
In a little Sicilian village at the edge of a forest, Giuseppe, a boy of 13, vanishes. Luna, his classmate who loves him, refuses to accept his mysterious disappearance. She rebels against the silence and complicity that surround her, and to find him she descends into the dark world which has swallowed him up and which has a lake as its mysterious entrance. Only their indestructible love will be able to bring her back alive.

== Production ==
The film is inspired by true events and takes place in the 1990s in Sicily. It is dedicated to the memory of Giuseppe Di Matteo, abducted in 1993 and then brutally killed on orders of Sicilian Mafia boss Giovanni Brusca in order to silence his father, a cooperating witness.

== Reception ==
=== Critical response ===
Sicilian Ghost Story opened the 56th Critics' Week at Cannes Film Festival on 18 May 2017. It was the first time an Italian film opened the Critics' Week, and received a ten-minute standing ovation.

The film holds a 91% approval rating on review aggregation website Rotten Tomatoes, based on 45 reviews with an average rating of 7.1/10. The site's consensus reads: "Sicilian Ghost Story uses a horrific real-life story as the framework for a powerfully acted foray into surprisingly beguiling fantasy territory." Metacritic assigned the film a weighted average score of 70 out of 100, based on 12 critics, indicating "generally favorable reviews".

Variety's review was outstandingly positive, stating that “with outstanding cinematography, underwater scenes and magical storytelling, the co-directors found a beautiful and strong way to tell such a tough story based on true events.”

The Hollywood Reporter described the film as a "Superb technical work transforms cruel reality into a fable with many ramifications," stating that "If Grassadonia and Piazza had simply retold the story, it would have been gripping enough, but they deepen the intensity and widen the meaning by letting the tale unfold in a strange filmic space between cruel reality and ghostly fantasy."

=== Awards and nominations ===
Sicilian Ghost Story won the 63rd David di Donatello for Best Adapted Script.
