= Michael Premo =

American artist and political activist

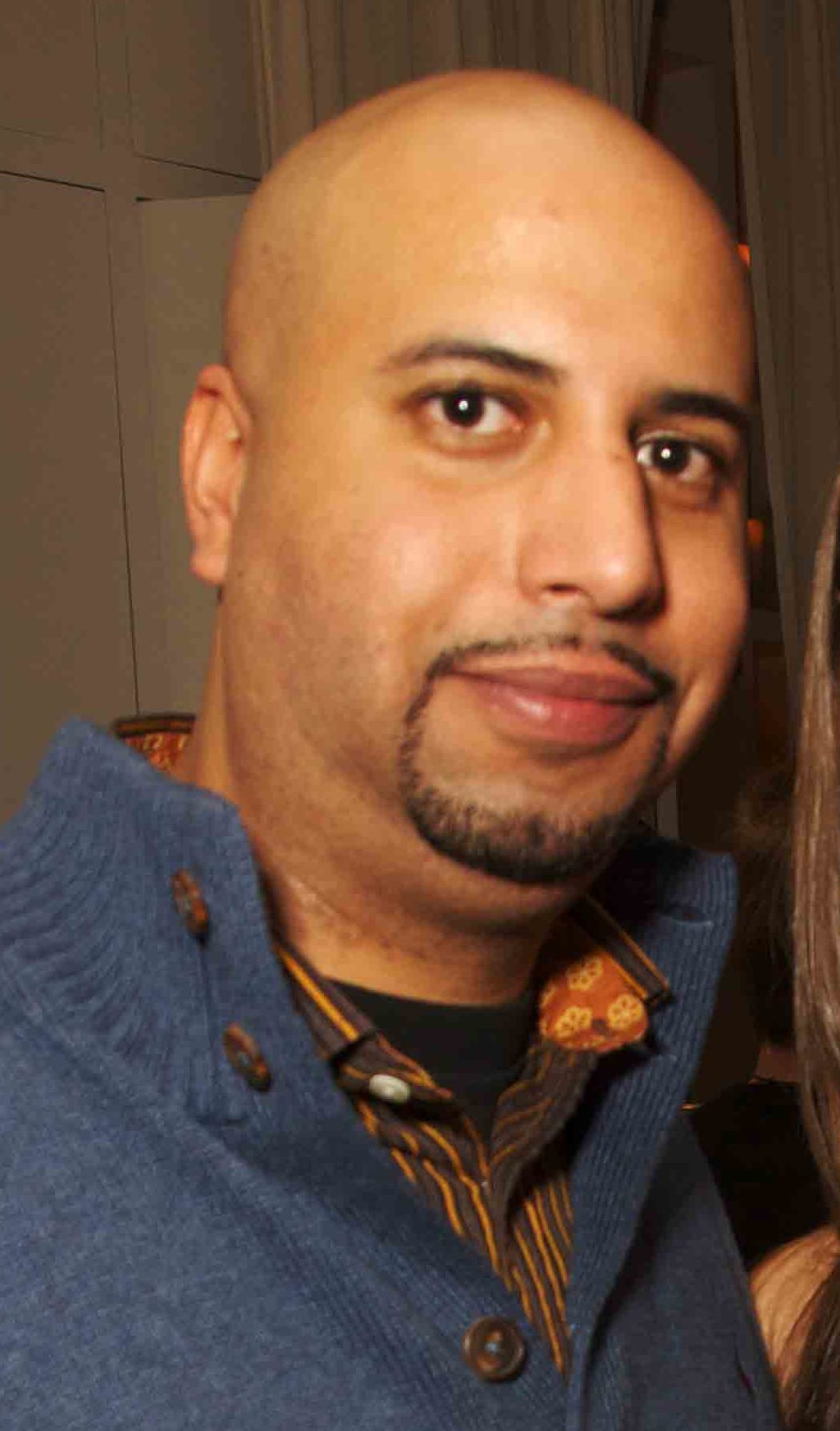
- Premo at Hip-Hop Theatre Festival 2010 anniversary
- Occupation: Artist
- Years active: 2005-present
- Known for: Occupy Wall Street

Michael Premo is an artist and activist who lives in Brooklyn. He played a significant role in Occupy Wall Street and Occupy Sandy's hurricane response effort.

== Work ==
On October 30, 2012, one day after Hurricane Sandy hit the New York region, Premo and three friends drove to the Red Hook Initiative and subsequently created Occupy Sandy after posting a note on Inner Occupy. Sandy Storyline, a participatory documentary co-directed by Premo, grew out of the Occupy Sandy relief effort to collect and share stories about the impact of Hurricane Sandy on neighborhoods, communities and lives. Sandy Storyline won the inaugural Transmedia award at the 2013 Tribeca Film Festival.

Also in 2012, Premo was an organizer in New York for Occupy Our Homes, which protested at housing auctions to support those affected by a foreclosure crisis during that era.

In March 2013, Premo was found not guilty in the first jury trial stemming from an Occupy Wall Street protest. Premo was arrested on December 17, 2011 and charged with assaulting an NYPD officer. Prosecutors argued and the arresting officer gave sworn testimony that Premo "charged the police like a linebacker, taking out a lieutenant and resisting arrest so forcefully that he fractured an officer's bone." The defense located a video taken by freelancer Jon Gerberg which contradicted the sworn testimony, instead showing officers "tackling [Premo] as he attempted to get back on his feet." Prosecutors claimed no video of Premo's arrest existed, yet the Gerberg video clearly showed an NYPD officer also filming Premo's arrest. One author wrote that "information provided by the NYPD in the trial was fabricated to such a degree that the allegations made by the police officers have turned out to be quite literally the opposite of what actually happened."

In 2017, Premo directed a 22-minute film, titled Water Warriors. The film premiered at the Tribeca Festival in April 2017 and had its U.S broadcast premiere on PBS by POV. Water Warriors highlights a rare success story of ordinary citizens — including members of the Mi’kmaq Elsipogtog First Nation, French-speaking Acadians and white, English-speaking families in New Brunswick, Canada — who fight to protect their water from the oil and natural gas industry.

In 2024, Premo directed and produced Homegrown, a documentary focusing on three right-wing activists, members of Proud Boys living in different parts of America, and their involvement in the Donald Trump 2020 presidential campaign up to their involvement in the attack on the Capitol on January 6, 2021. The documentary had its world premiere at the 81st Venice International Film Festival in the International Critics Week section on August 30, 2024. and was screened in October 2024 at the Zurich Film Festival in the section competing for Best Documentary. Its North American premier took place at the Camden International Film Festival in September and then screened at the Hamptons International Film Festival in October 2024.

== Works ==
- Khatib, K.; Killjoy, M.; McGuire, M.; Graeber, D. (2012). "Unlocking the Radical Imagination". We Are Many: Reflections on Movement Strategy from Occupation to Liberation. AK Press. ISBN 978-1-84935-117-1.

== See also ==
- The Civilians
- Storycorps
