= Lukas Lauermann =

Austrian cellist

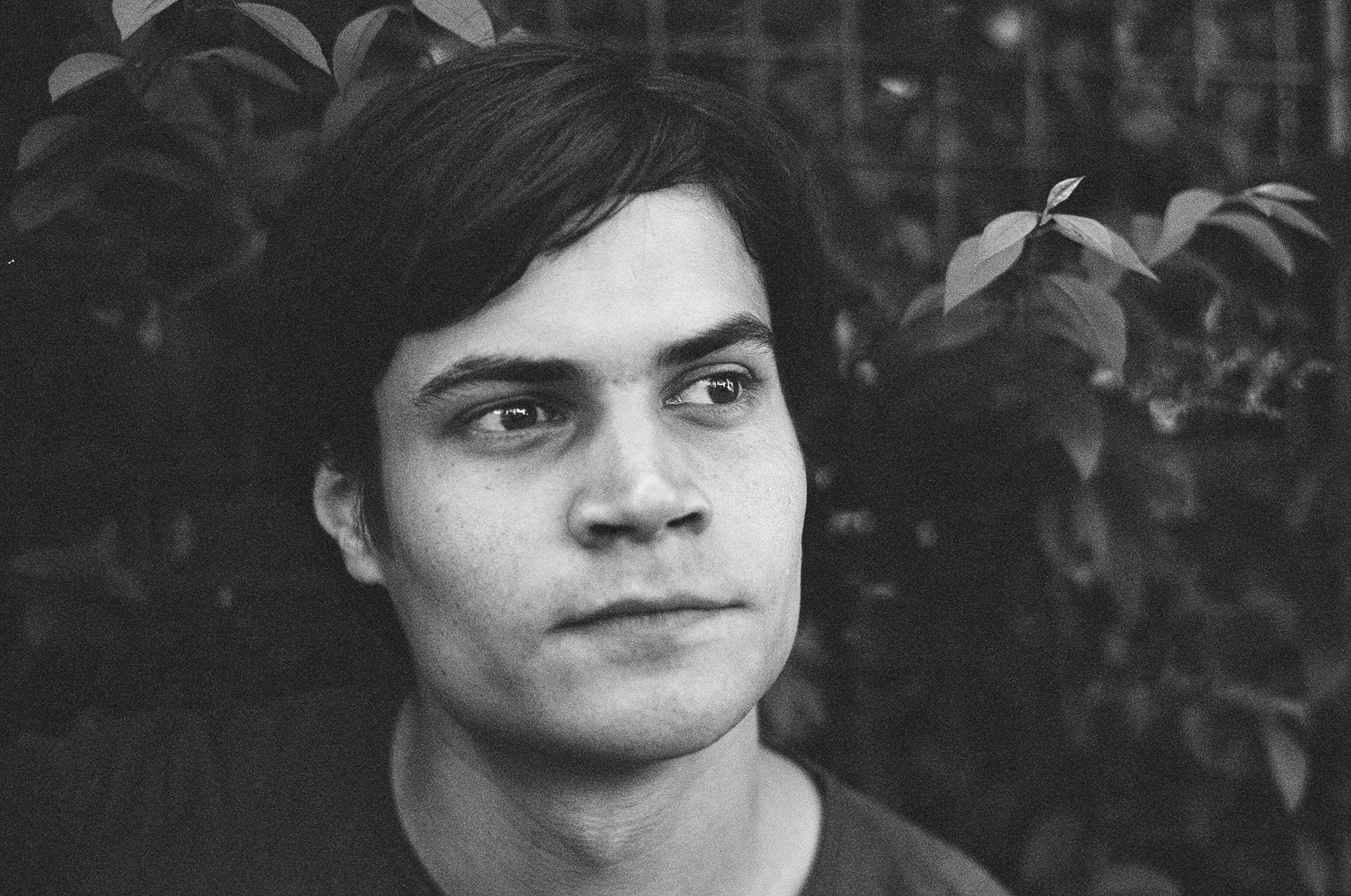
- Lukas Lauermann (2016)

Background information
- Born: Lukas Lauermann; March 18, 1985; Vienna, Austria
- Genres: Contemporary music, experimental, pop, jazz
- Occupations: Cellist, composer, sound designer
- Instrument: Cello
- Years active: 2007–present
- Website: Lukas Lauermann Official Website

Lukas Lauermann is an Austrian cellist and sound designer.

== Life ==
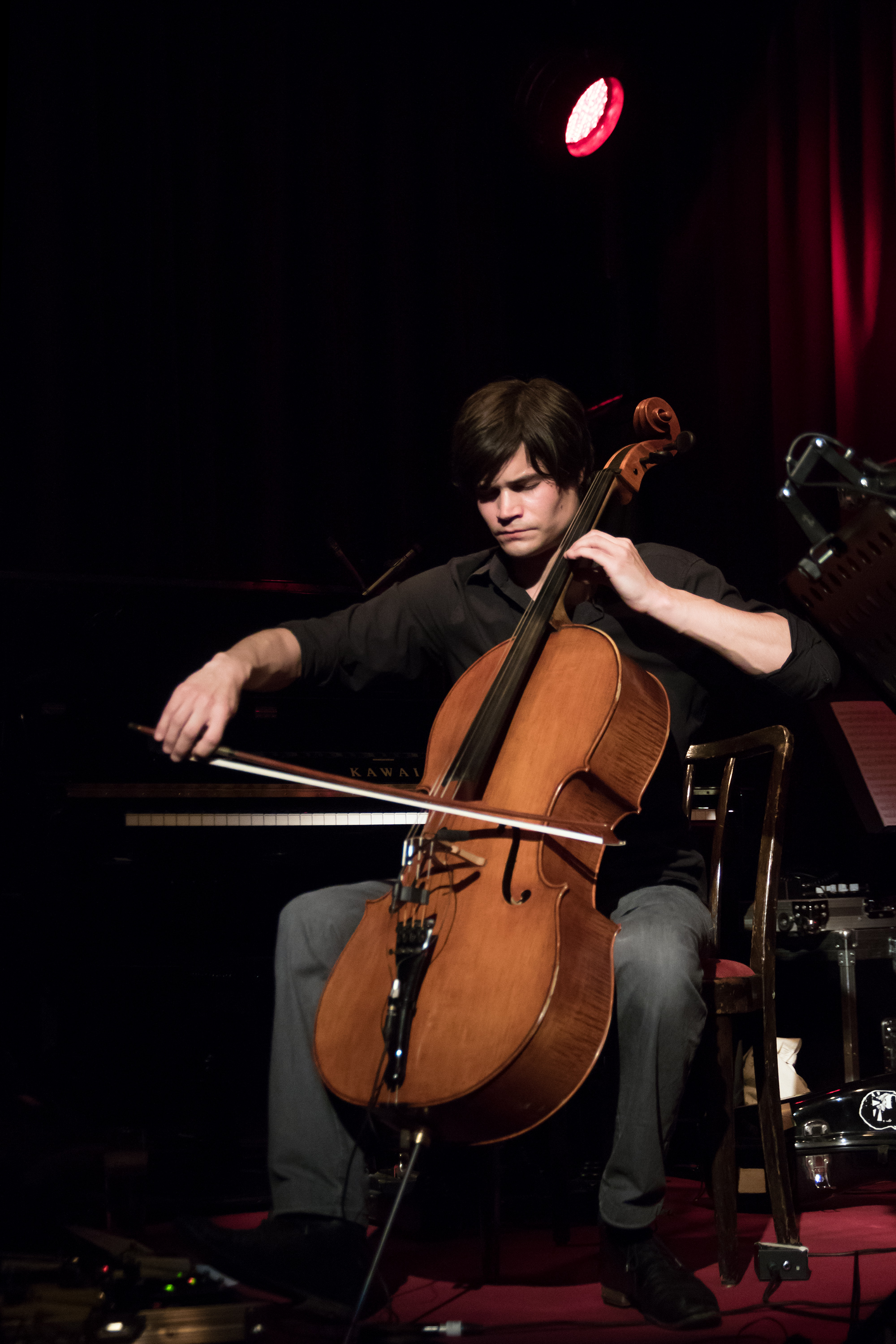
Lukas Lauermann (2016)

Lauermann studied at the University of Music and Performing Arts Vienna und the Anton Bruckner University. He works as a teacher at the Prinzersdorf music school, and in courses of the association Artes Juventutis.

As a live and studio musician, he plays cello, works on electronic sound design and writes string arrangements. One focus is the development and implementation of theme-based improvisational concepts as a soloist and for ensembles. His field of activity also includes recordings and compositions for theater, radio drama and film music.

As a live musician, studio musician and arranger he has already performed with A Life, A Song, A Cigarette, Alp Bora Quartet, Donauwellenreiter, Soap & Skin, Schnitzlerband (Fräulein Gustl), Ping Ping, Twentieth Century, Filament (FLMNT), Ritornell, Alex Miksch, Stephanie Hacker and Alfred Goubran worked. He has been a live musician and arranger in projects with Mimu Merz, Krixi, Kraxi and the Kroxn, Eloui, Loretta Who and Mira Lu Kovacs (Schmied's Pulse). As a studio musician he is on productions with Mauracher, Marilies Jagsch, Raphael Sas, The Nino from Vienna, Sleep Sleep, Gerard.

He has appeared on stage with Mark Lanegan, Ken Stringfellow, Hans-Joachim Roedelius, Tim Story and Velojet. Since 2013, he has also toured solo. The concert activity led him, in addition to appearances in Austria (Porgy & Bess, Vienna Konzerthaus, Burgtheater and others), also to Germany (Cologne Philharmonic, Concert Hall Dortmund and others), France (Paris La Cigale and others), England (London Royal Festival Hall), Netherlands (Rotterdamse Schowburg), Belgium, Turkey, Singapore, Taiwan (National Concert Hall Taipei), China (Shanghai Oriental Art Center and others), Jordan (Amman Jazz Festival), Canada, and Iran.

As part of performance projects he worked with the artist collectives Gelitin and Saint Genet, Salvatore Viviano and Bree Zucker.

== Discography ==
- 2007: A Life, a Song, a Cigarette – CD Fresh Kills Landfill (Siluh Records)
- 2008: Marilies Jagsch – CD Obituary for a Lost Mind (Asinella/ Broken Silence)
- 2008: Alp Bora Trio – CD Amber (Extraplatte)
- 2008: Mauracher – CD Loving Custodians (Universal Music Austria)
- 2008: A Life, a Song, a Cigarette – CD/LP Black Air (Siluh Records)
- 2009: Karl Flanner, ein Widerstandskämpfer – DVD (Verein für Zeitgeschichten)
- 2010: Marilies Jagsch – CD From Ice to Water to Nothing (Asinella/ Broken Silence)
- 2011: Ben Martin – CD Born Under Dark Skies (violetnoise)
- 2012: Alp Bora Quartett – CD Bab (Lotus Records)
- 2012: A Life, a Song, a Cigarette – CD/LP Tideland (Siluh Records)
- 2012: Mauracher – CD Super Seven (Fabrique Records)
- 2012: Raphael Sas – CD Gespenster (Problembär)
- 2012: Schnitzlerband – (Hör-)Buch Fräulein Gustl (Edition Meerauge)
- 2012: Der Nino aus Wien – LP Des ollaletzte Liad (Das vielleicht letzte Magazin der Welt, Sampler)
- 2012: Ping Ping – EP Under Your Skin (Fabrique Records)
- 2013: Soap&Skin – 7inch Sugarbread (Pias)
- 2013: Der Zaunkönig und die silberne Flöte – Hörbuch für Kinder (Aram Verlag) - Gewinner des deutschen Medienpreises "Leopold"
- 2013: Sleep Sleep – CD/LP Gospel (Noiseappeal Records)
- 2014: Mauracher – Digital-Veröffentlichung Let's Communicate (Hurray!! Music)
- 2014: Der unbekannte Soldat – Hörbuch (Mono Verlag)
- 2014: The Twentieth Century – CD und digital (mosz records)
- 2014: Der Nino aus Wien – CD Bäume (Problembär)
- 2014: Kasar – CD und digital Walk On (Sonar Kollektiv)
- 2015: Gerard – CD Neue Welt Akustik
- 2015: Alex Miksch – CD und digital 9 Lem (Hoanzl)
- 2015: irgendetwas.schönes – digital The Making Of
- 2015: Remember Me – Song mit Mira Lu Kovacs für den Charity Sampler Melodies for Refugees (Hoanzl)
- 2016: A Life, A Song, A Cigarette – CD/LP/digital All That Glitters Is Not Gold (Wohnzimmer)
- 2016: Stephanie Hacker – CD you and me (Session Work Records)
- 2016: Der Nino aus Wien – Adria EP (Problembär)
- 2016: Ritornell – CD/LP/digital If Nine Was Eight (Karaoke Kalk)
- 2016: Goubran – CD/digital Irrlicht (Konkord)
- 2016: Einer von uns – E-Book (Text: Sandra Gugic, Kabeljau&Dorsch)
- 2016: Natalie Ofenböck und Der Nino aus Wien – Buch und CD Das grüne Album (Problembär/Charlie Bader)
- 2016: Goubran – LP Schiffe aus Schnee (Konkord)
- 2016: Donauwellenreiter – CD Euphoria (Laloki Music)
- 2017: Der Nino aus Wien – CD/LP/digital wach (Problembär/Seayou)
- 2017: Lukas Lauermann – CD/digital How I Remember Now I Remember How (col legno)
- 2017: Donauwellenreiter – CD/digital Donauwellenreiter Play Gianmaria Testa (Aestate)
- 2017: Lausch – CD/LP/digital Quiet Men (Panta R&E)
