= The Witness (2024 film) =

2024 film

- Directed by: Nader Saeivar
- Written by: Jafar Panahi; Nader Saeivar
- Produced by: Said Nur Akkuş; Silvana Santamaria; Arash T. Riahi; Sabine Gruber
- Starring: Maryam Bobani
- Cinematography: Rozbeh Raeigha
- Edited by: Jafar Panahi
- Music by: Karwan Marouf
- Release date: September 5, 2024 (Venice)
- Countries: Austria; Germany
- Language: Persian

The Witness (originally titled Shahed) is a 2024 Austrian-German crime-drama film co-written and directed by Nader Saeivar. It is the first film project of Jafar Panahi, here serving as screenwriter, editor and artistic consultant, following his 2022 incarceration.

The film, inspired by the Woman, Life, Freedom movement, premiered at the 81st edition of the Venice Film Festival in the Horizons Extra sidebar, where it won the Audience Award.

== Plot ==
In today’s Iran, retired schoolteacher Tarlan unexpectedly witnesses a heated argument between her close friend Zara and Zara’s husband, Solat — a high-ranking government official. Solat is pressuring Zara to give up her job as a dance instructor, something she deeply loves. The conflict spirals out of control, and by the end, Zara is dead. When the police refuse to investigate the case properly, Tarlan makes a bold decision: she will go public. But speaking out puts not only her own life at risk, but also the safety of her family.

== Cast ==
- Maryam Bobani
- Nader Naderpour
- Hana Kamkar
- Abbas Imani
