= Wild Diamond =

2024 film by Agathe Riedinger

- Theatrical release poster
- French: Diamant brut
- Directed by: Agathe Riedinger
- Written by: Agathe Riedinger
- Produced by: Priscilla Bertin; Judith Nora
- Starring: Malou Khebizi; Idir Azougli; Andréa Bescond
- Cinematography: Noé Bach
- Edited by: Lila Desiles
- Music by: Audrey Ismaël
- Production companies: Silex Films; France 2 Cinéma; Germaine Films
- Distributed by: Pyramide Distribution
- Release dates: 15 May 2024 (Cannes); 20 November 2024 (France)
- Running time: 103 minutes
- Country: France
- Language: French
- Box office: $349,266

Wild Diamond (French: Diamant brut) is a 2024 French coming-of-age drama film written and directed by Agathe Riedinger, in her feature directorial debut, adapted from her own 2017 short film J'attends Jupiter. It stars Malou Khebizi, Idir Azougli, Andréa Bescond and Ashley Romano.

The film was selected to compete for the Palme d'Or and Caméra d'Or at the 77th Cannes Film Festival, where it premiered on 15 May 2024. It was theatrically released on 20 November 2024 by Pyramide Distribution.

== Cast ==
- Malou Khebizi as Liane
- Idir Azougli as Dino
- Andréa Bescond as Sabine
- Ashley Romano as Alicia
- Alexis Manenti as Nathan
- Kilia Fernane as Stéphanie
- Léa Gorla as Carla
- Alexandra Noisier as Jessy
- Antonia Buresi as Alexandra Ferrer

== Production ==
The film is an expansion of Riedinger's short film J'attends Jupiter (2017). Priscilla Bertin and Judith Nora produced the film through Silex Films.

Principal photography began on 3 April 2023. The film was shot between Nice and Fréjus.

== Release ==
Wild Diamond was selected to compete for the Palme d'Or at the 2024 Cannes Film Festival, where it had its world premiere on 15 May 2024. It has also been selected for the MAMI Mumbai Film Festival 2024 under the World Cinema section.

Pyramide Distribution theatrically released the film in France on 20 November 2024.

== Reception ==
=== Critical response ===
On the review aggregator website Rotten Tomatoes, 85% of 40 critics' reviews are positive. The website's consensus reads: "A stylish character study and unsettling exploration of celebrity in the digital age, Wild Diamond marks a memorable feature debut for writer-director Agathe Riedinger." Metacritic, which uses a weighted average, assigned the film a score of 65 out of 100, based on 13 critics, indicating "generally favorable" reviews. On AlloCiné, the film received an average rating of 3.3 out of 5 stars, based on 35 reviews from French critics.

=== Accolades ===
Award	Date of ceremony	Category	Recipient(s)	Result	Ref.
Cannes Film Festival	25 May 2024	Palme d'Or	Agathe Riedinger	Nominated	
Cannes Film Festival	25 May 2024	Caméra d'Or	Agathe Riedinger	Nominated	
César Awards	28 February 2025	Best Female Revelation	Malou Khebizi	Nominated	
César Awards	28 February 2025	Best First Film	Priscilla Bertin, Judith Nora, Agathe Riedinger	Nominated	
Lumière Awards	20 January 2025	Best Female Revelation	Malou Khebizi	Nominated	
Lumière Awards	20 January 2025	Best First Film	Wild Diamond	Nominated	
