= One of Those Days When Hemme Dies =

2024 film

- Turkish theatrical release poster
- Turkish: Hemme’nin öldüğü günlerden biri
- Directed by: Murat Fıratoğlu
- Written by: Murat Fıratoğlu
- Produced by: Murat Fıratoğlu
- Starring: Salih Taşçı
- Cinematography: Semih Yildiz; Nedim Dedecan; Abdurrahman Öncü
- Edited by: Eyüp Zana Ekinci
- Release dates: September 5, 2024 (Venice); September 26, 2024 (Adana); December 13, 2024 (Türkiye)
- Running time: 83 minutes
- Countries: Turkey; France; Bosnia and Herzegovina; United Kingdom
- Language: Turkish
- Box office: ₺1.35 million

One of Those Days When Hemme Dies (Turkish: Hemme’nin öldüğü günlerden biri) is a 2024 drama film written and directed by Murat Fıratoğlu, in his directorial debut. It follows Eyüp (Fıratoğlu), a seasonal laborer working under the scorching sun during a tomato harvest in Siverek, trying to repay his debt.

The film had its world premiere at the Orizzonti section of the 81st Venice International Film Festival on 5 September 2024, where it won the Special Jury Prize. It also won Best Film and the SİYAD Jury Award at the 2024 Adana Golden Boll Film Festival.

It was selected as the Turkish entry for the Best International Feature Film at the 98th Academy Awards, but it was not nominated.

== Plot ==
Eyüp had traveled to İzmir in hopes of finding work and earning money, but after failing to settle there, he returned with his wife and three children to his ailing mother's home in Siverek. He finds work drying tomatoes but is not paid his daily wages. He visits his sister’s house and retrieves a gun hidden among quilts. Enraged, Eyüp roams the town intending to kill Hemme. However, villagers continuously divert him with trivial tasks throughout the day, which ends with Eyüp dancing side by side with Hemme at a wedding.

== Cast ==
- Salih Taşçı
- Murat Fıratoğlu as Eyüp
- Sefer Fıratoğlu
- Güneş Sayın
- Ali Barkın
- Çetin Fıratoğlu

== Release ==
One of Those Days When Hemme Dies had its world premiere at the 81st Venice International Film Festival on September 5, 2024, in the Orizzonti (Horizons) section.

The film also competed in the Official Competition Section at the 21st Marrakech International Film Festival in December 2024. It was also showcased at the 35th Singapore International Film Festival on 5 December 2024.

In April 2025, the film was selected at the Las Palmas de Gran Canaria International Film Festival in the Official Competition Section. It was screened on 5 June 2025 at the 72nd Sydney Film Festival in Features.

== Reception ==
Muriel Del Don reviewing for Cineuropa wrote, "One of Those Days When Hemme Dies is an aesthetically powerful first film which turns simplicity into a battleground."

=== Box office ===
As of April 17, 2025, the film has grossed ₺1,351,186 from 7,292 admissions.

== Accolades ==
Award	Year	Category	Nominee(s)	Result	Ref.
Venice Film Festival	2024	Orizzonti Special Jury Prize	One of Those Days When Hemme Dies	Won	
Adana Golden Boll Film Festival	2024	Best Film	One of Those Days When Hemme Dies	Won	
Adana Golden Boll Film Festival	2024	SİYAD Jury Best Film Award	One of Those Days When Hemme Dies	Won	

== See also ==
- List of submissions to the 98th Academy Awards for Best International Feature Film
- List of Turkish submissions for the Academy Award for Best International Feature Film
