= Theresa Frostad Eggesbø =

Norwegian actor, pop singer and songwriter

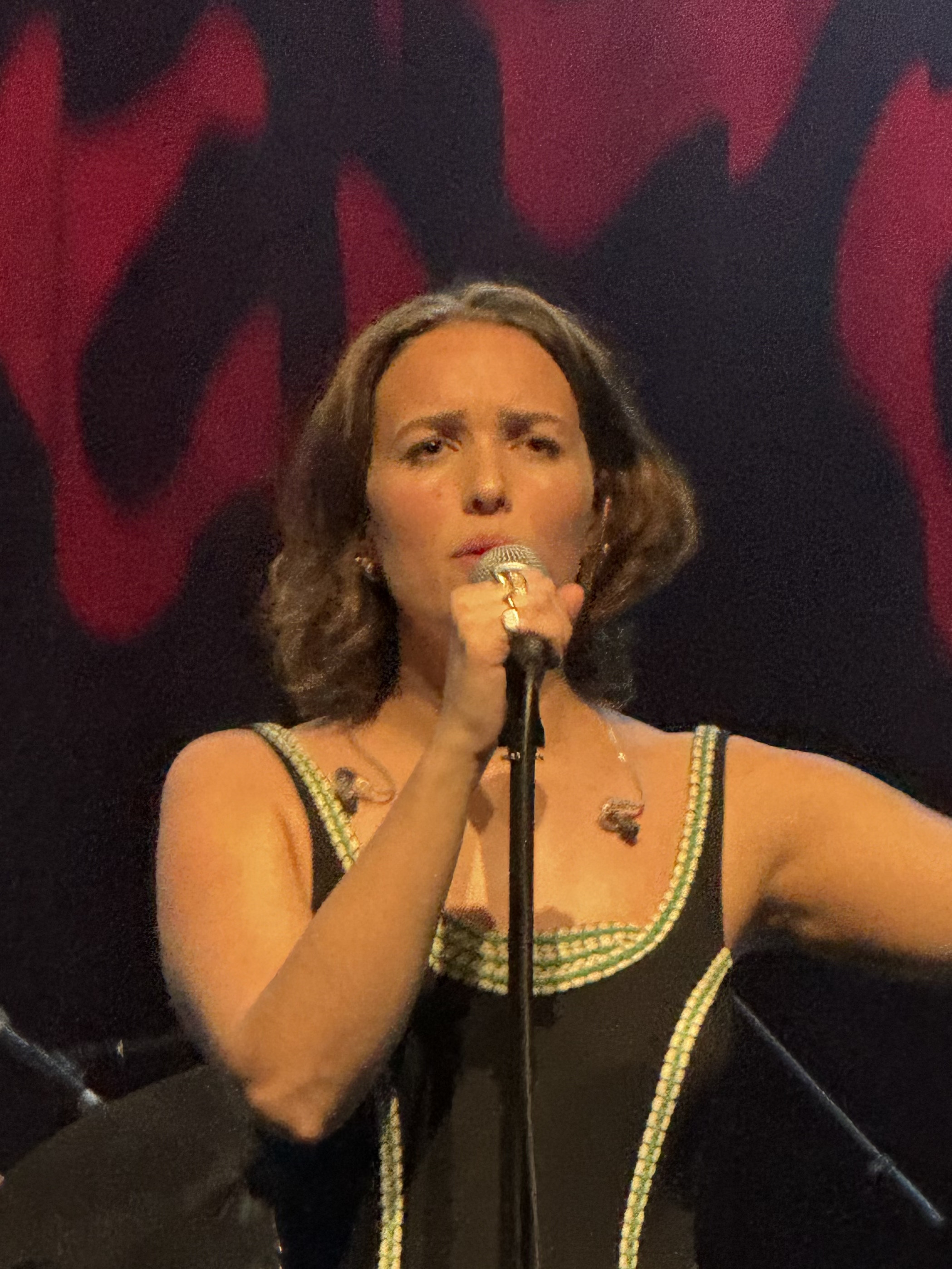
- Born: Theresa Frostad Eggesbø; 28 December 1998

Theresa Frostad Eggesbø (born 27 September 1997) is a Norwegian actress. She is a pop singer/songwriter under the name Resa Saffa Park.

Theresa Frostad Eggesbø was born on 27 September 1997 in Dubai, United Arab Emirates. She studied at the Liverpool Institute for Performing Arts.

== Acting ==
Her breakthrough role was as Sonja in 2016 in the third season of the Norwegian television high school drama Skam. She went on to have a lead role in the feature film Kometen (The Comet, 2017) alongside Axel Bøyum, Trond Espen Seim, Cecilie Mosli and Jørgen Langhelle. Her role in the Danish short film November (2018) won her a Best Acting prize at Cinalfama Lisbon International Film Festival, Alfama. Her most prominent role is as the jötunn Saxa in the fantasy television series Ragnarok (2020–2023).

== Music career ==
Her music career began with her debut single "Sassy" in 2018. Her debut EP Dumb and Numb was released in 2020, containing her singles "Love Ain't Free", "Sunday", "You Need a Puppy" and "Borrowed Time". Her second EP was Spaces (2022), featuring the singles “Dandelions”, “Candles”, and "Tendencies". Her album Madness. Let me in! was released in March 2023.
