= Homegrown (2024 film) =

2024 American documentary film

- Directed by: Michael Premo
- Produced by: Michael Premo; Rachel Falcone
- Cinematography: Michael Premo
- Edited by: Kristen Nutile; Shilpa Kunnappillil
- Music by: Khari Mateen
- Production companies: Storyline; Impact Partners
- Distributed by: Gathr
- Release dates: August 30, 2024 (Venice); January 6, 2026 (Gathr)
- Running time: 109 minutes
- Country: United States
- Language: English

Homegrown is a 2024 American documentary film, directed and produced by Michael Premo. It follows three right-wing activists during the Donald Trump 2020 presidential campaign, however, once they become convinced the election was stolen they take to the streets.

It had its world premiere at the 81st Venice International Film Festival in the International Critics Week section on August 30, 2024.

== Premise ==
Three right-wing activists campaign for the Donald Trump 2020 presidential campaign, however, once they become convinced the election was stolen they take to the streets.

== Release ==
It had its world premiere at the 81st Venice International Film Festival in the International Critics Week section on August 30, 2024. It had its North American premier at the Camden International Film Festival in September and will also screen at the Hamptons International Film Festival in October 2024.

The film was screened in October 2024 at the Zurich Film Festival in the section competing for Best Documentary.

After not finding a US distributor, the film's production team self-released Homegrown on the streaming platform Gathr on January 6, 2026.
