= The Mohican =

2024 film

- Theatrical release poster
- Directed by: Frédéric Farrucci
- Written by: Frédéric Farrucci
- Produced by: Diane Jassem; Céline Chapdaniel
- Starring: Alexis Manenti; Mara Taquin
- Cinematography: Jeanne Lapoirie
- Edited by: Mathilde Van de Moortel
- Music by: Rone
- Release date: 1 September 2024 (Venice)
- Language: French

The Mohican (French: Le Mohican) is a 2024 French thriller-drama film written and directed by Frédéric Farrucci and starring Alexis Manenti. It premiered at the 81st edition of the Venice Film Festival.

== Plot ==
Joseph is one of the last coastal shepherds in Corsica. His land is coveted by the underworld for a real estate project but he chooses not to give in. When he leaves the man who came to intimidate him, the godfather's own son, between life and death, he becomes the prey of a merciless hunt.

== Cast ==
- Alexis Manenti as Joseph Cardelli
- Mara Taquin as Vannina
- Théo Frimigacci as Xavier Pietri
- Paul Garatte as Pierre
- Marie-Pierre Nouveau as Stéphanie
- Michel Ferracci as Michel

== Production ==
The film was produced by Koro Films. Principal photography started in Corsica in September 2023. According to Ferrucci, he got inspiration for the film from his 2017 documentary Via Di Vita: In Terra Pasturale, which featured a Corsican shepherd who "saw himself as an anomaly in his region, much like the last of the Mohicans".

== Release ==
The film had its world premiere at the 81st Venice International Film Festival in the Orizzonti Extra sidebar. It was released in French cinemas on 12 February 2025.

== Reception ==
The film won the Fischer Audience Award – Meet the Neighbors+ at the 2024 Thessaloniki Film Festival.

Cineuropa's film critic Fabien Lemercier praised the film, describing it as "captivating", "an excellent genre film" and "a gripping and ultra physical survival story". Martin Kudlac from ScreenAnarchy noted: "Farrucci’s ability to blend genre with social commentary is a defining feature of his work. [...] Farrucci's willingness to embrace genres to tackle a social issue results into an intriuging genre fare, or so-called arthouse elevated genre".
