= Agathe Riedinger =

French film director and screenwriter

- Education: École Nationale Supérieure des Arts Décoratifs
- Occupations: Film director, screenwriter

Agathe Riedinger (French: [aɡat ʁidɛ̃ʒe]) is a French film director and screenwriter.

== Education ==
Riedinger studied at the École Nationale Supérieure des Arts Décoratifs in Paris.

== Career ==
After directing commercials, music videos, and the short films Paul Ange Martin, Waiting for Jupiter and Ève, Riedinger's debut feature, Wild Diamond, was selected to compete for the Palme d'Or at the 2024 Cannes Film Festival.

== Filmography ==
=== Films ===
Year	Title	Notes	Ref.
2015	Paul Ange Martin	Short film	
2017	Waiting for Jupiter	Short film	
2018	Ève	Short film	
2024	Wild Diamond	—N/a	

=== Music videos ===
Year	Title	Artist	Ref.
2012	"Sucrer les Fraises"	La Grande Sophie	
2014	"E.R."	Nameless	
2015	"Elegance"	Vincent Londez & le Vague à l'âme Orchestra	
2020	"M'en veux pas"	Marie-Flore	

=== Commercials ===
Year	Title	Brand	Notes	Ref.
2018	Premier acte	Hexagona	Short fashion film that screened at the Bucharest Short Film Festival	
2020	"Vaders"	Ader Error	—N/a	

== Awards and nominations ==
Year	Award	Category	Nominated work	Result	Ref.
2019	Clermont-Ferrand International Short Film Festival	Lab Competition	Ève	Nominated	
2024	Cannes Film Festival	Palme d'Or	Wild Diamond	Nominated	
2024	Cannes Film Festival	Camera d'Or	Wild Diamond	Nominated	
