= 34th Tokyo International Film Festival =

2021 Japanese film festival

- Official poster of the 34th Tokyo International Film Festival
- Opening film: Cry Macho
- Closing film: Dear Evan Hansen
- Location: Tokyo, Japan
- Founded: 1985
- Awards: Tokyo Grand Prix: Vera Dreams of the Sea
- Festival date: 30 October–8 November 2021
- Website: 2021.tiff-jp.net/en/

Tokyo International Film Festival
- 35th 32nd 33rd (cancelled)

The 34th Tokyo International Film Festival was a film festival that took place from 30 October to 8 November 2021. This was the first iteration of the festival in two years, as the 33rd Tokyo International Film Festival due to be held in 2020 was cancelled due to the COVID-19 pandemic French actress Isabelle Huppert served as jury president. With Vera Dreams of the Sea winning the Tokyo Grand Prix, the festival's top prize, Kaltrina Krasniqi became the third female director to achieve the prize, after Caroline Link in 1997 and Lorraine Lévy in 2012.

The official poster for the festival was created by fashion designer Koshino Junko and is intended to represent the theme of "crossing borders" created by the COVID-19 pandemic, socioeconomic disparities, and international conflict.

The festival opened with Cry Macho directed by Clint Eastwood and closed with Dear Evan Hansen directed by Stephen Chbosky.

== Juries ==
=== International Competition ===
- Isabelle Huppert, French actress
- Aoyama Shinji, Japanese writer-director
- Chris Fujiwara, American film critic
- Lorna Tee, Malaysian producer
- Hiroko Sebu, Japanese film score composer

=== Asian Future ===
- Han Yanli, Japanese professor at the University of Tokyo
- Hojo Masato, Japanese film distribution manager
- Ishii Yuya, Japanese director

=== Amazon Prime Video Take One ===
- Isao Yukisada, Japanese director
- Makiko Watanabe, Japanese actress
- Toshihiro Isomi, Japanese art director
- Andrijana Cvetkovik, Macedonian director and former ambassador of North Macedonia to Japan

== Venues ==
The following 7 venues were hosted the festival screenings.

- Tokyo Midtown Hibiya
- Toho Cinemas Chanter
- Tokyo International Forum
- Yurakucho Yomiuri Hall
- Kadokawa Cinema Yurakucho
- Humantrust Cinema Yurakucho
- Cine Switch Ginza

== Official Selection ==
=== Competition ===
The following films were selected to compete for the Tokyo Grand Prix.

English Title	Original Title	Director(s)	Production Country
Arisaka		Mikhail Red	Philippines
Californie		Alessandro Cassigoli, Casey Kauffman	Italy
Crane Lantern	Durna Çırağı	Hilal Baydarov	Azerbaijan
Hommage	오마주	Shin Su-won	South Korea
Just Remembering	ちょっと思い出しただけ	Daigo Matsui	Japan
La civil		Teodora Mihai	Belgium, Romania, Mexico
One and Four	一个和四个	Jigme Trinley	China
Payback	Resbak	Brillante Mendoza	Philippines
Poet	Ақын	Darezhan Omirbaev	Kazakhstan
The Daughter	La hija	Manuel Martín Cuenca	Spain
The Dawning of the Day	Alborada	Asoka Handagama	Sri Lanka
The Four Walls	Dört Duvar	Bahman Ghobadi	Turkey
The Other Tom	El otro Tom	Rodrigo Plá, Laura Santullo	Mexico, United States
Third Time Lucky	三度目の、正直	Tadashi Nohara	Japan
Vera Dreams of the Sea	Vera andrron detin	Kaltrina Krasniqi	Kosovo, North Macedonia, Albania

=== Asian Future ===
The following films were selected for the Asian Future section.

English Title	Original Title	Director(s)	Production Country
American Girl	美國女孩	Fiona Roan Feng-i	Taiwan
Asu		Sanjeewa Pushpakumara	Sri Lanka
Somebody's Flowers	誰かの花	Yusuke Okuda	Japan
The Brittle Thread	Jhini Bini Chadariya	Ritesh Sharma	India
The Brokers		Daniel R. Palacio	Philippines
The Coffin Painter	异乡来客	Da Fei	China
The Last Birds of Passage	Turna Misali	Iffet Eren Danisman Boz	Turkey
The Nighthawk's First Love	よだかの片想い	Yuka Yasukawa	Japan
When Pomegranates Howl	Vaght-e Chigh-e Anar	Granaz Moussavi	Afghanistan, Australia, Netherlands, Iran
World, Northern Hemisphere	Jahan, Nimkoreh-e Shomali	Hossein Tehrani	Iran

=== Gala Selection ===
The following films were selected to be screened as part of the Gala Selection.

English Title	Original Title	Director(s)	Production Country
Churuli	ചുരുളി	Lijo Jose Pellissery	India
Cry Macho		Clint Eastwood	United States
Dear Evan Hansen		Stephen Chbosky	United States
Gensan Punch		Brillante Mendoza	Philippines, Japan
Last Night in Soho		Edgar Wright	United Kingdom
Limbo	智齒	Soi Cheang	Hong Kong
Memoria		Apichatpong Weerasethakul	Colombia, Thailand, France, Germany, Mexico, Qatar
Raging Fire	怒火	Benny Chan	Hong Kong, China
The Eyes of Tammy Faye		Michael Showalter	United States
The French Dispatch of the Liberty, Kansas Evening Sun		Wes Anderson	United States
The Hand of God	È stata la mano di Dio	Paolo Sorrentino	Italy
The Power of the Dog		Jane Campion	New Zealand, Australia

=== World Focus ===
The following films were selected for the World Focus section, which focuses on international films.

English Title	Original Title	Director(s)	Production Country
Il buco		Michelangelo Frammartino	Italy, France, Germany
Libertad		Clara Roquet	Spain, Belgium
Murina		Antoneta Alamat Kusijanović	Croatia, Brazil, United States, Slovenia
Swan Song		Todd Stephens	United States
Terrorizers	青春弒戀	Ho Wi-ding	Taiwan
The Box	La caja	Lorenzo Vigas	United States, Mexico
Veneciafrenia		Álex de la Iglesia	Spain
Vengeance Is Mine, All Others Pay Cash	Seperti Dendam, Rindu Harus Dibayar Tuntas	Edwin	Indonesia, Singapore, Germany

=== Nippon Cinema Now ===
The following films were selected for Nippon Cinema Now, which aims to introduce Japanese films to international audiences.

English Title	Original Title	Director(s)	Production Country
Blue	ブルー	Keisuke Yoshida	Japan
Himeanole	ヒメアノ～ル	Keisuke Yoshida	Japan
Intimate Stranger	親密な他人	Mayu Nakamura	Japan
Intolerance	空白	Keisuke Yoshida	Japan
Moonlight Shadow	ムーンライト・シャドウ	Edmund Yeo	Japan
Nagisa	なぎさ	Takeshi Kogahara	Japan
Riverside Mukolitta	川っぺりムコリッタ	Naoko Ogigami	Japan
Spaghetti Code Love	スパゲティコード・ラブ	Takeshi Maruyama	Japan
The Unnamable Dance	名付けようのない踊り	Isshin Inudo	Japan
What She Likes...	彼女が好きなものは	Shogo Kusano	Japan

=== Japanese Animation ===
The following films were selected for the Japanese Animation section.

English Title	Original Title	Director(s)	Production Country
Chie the Brat: Downtown Story	じゃりン子チエ	Isao Takahata	Japan
Fortune Favors Lady Nikuko	漁港の肉子ちゃん	Ayumu Watanabe	Japan
Goodbye, Don Glees!	グッバイ、ドン・グリーズ!	Atsuko Ishizuka	Japan
Hula Fulla Dance	フラ・フラダンス	Seiji Mizushima	Japan
Hyohyo: Dear Mr. Yasuo Otsuka	飄々 ～拝啓、大塚康生様～	Hidenori Ushiro	Japan
Inu-Oh	犬王	Masaaki Yuasa	Japan
Kamen Rider W Forever: A to Z/The Gaia Memories of Fate	仮面ライダーW（ダブル） FOREVER AtoZ／運命のガイアメモリ	Koichi Sakamoto	Japan
Kamen Rider vs. Shocker	仮面ライダー対ショッカー	Minoru Yamada	Japan
Kamen Rider vs. Ambassador Hell	仮面ライダー対じごく大使	Minoru Yamada	Japan
Kamen Rider V3 vs. Destron Mutants	仮面ライダーV3対デストロン怪人	Minoru Yamada	Japan
Kamen Rider Black: Hurry to Onigashima	仮面ライダーBLACK 鬼ヶ島へ急行せよ	Michio Konishi	Japan
Kamen Rider Decade: All Riders vs. Dai-Shocker	劇場版 仮面ライダーディケイド オールライダー対大ショッカー	Osamu Kaneda	Japan
The Little Prince and The Eight-Headed Dragon	わんぱく王子の大蛇退治	Yūgo Serikawa	Japan

=== Japanese Classics ===
The following films were selected for the Japanese Classics section.

English Title	Original Title	Director(s)	Production Country
Forever a Woman	乳房よ永遠なれ	Kinuyo Tanaka	Japan
Love Under the Crucifix	お吟さま	Kinuyo Tanaka	Japan
The Family Game	家族ゲーム	Yoshimitsu Morita	Japan
The Moon Has Risen	月は上りぬ	Kinuyo Tanaka	Japan
The Wandering Princess	流転の王妃	Kinuyo Tanaka	Japan

=== Youth ===
The following films were selected for the Youth section.

English Title	Original Title	Director(s)	Production Country
Cow		Andrea Arnold	United Kingdom
Cryptozoo		Dash Shaw	United States
Our Eternal Summer	L'été l'éternité	Émilie Aussel	France

=== TIFF Series ===
The following television series were selected for the TIFF Series section.

English Title	Original Title	Director(s)	Production Country
Folklore (episodes 8 and 12)		Seiko Matsuda, Nicole Midori Woodford	Japan, Singapore
Fragrance of the First Flower	第一次遇見花香的那刻	Angel I-han Teng	Taiwan

== Awards ==
=== Competition ===
- Tokyo Grand Prix: Vera Dreams of the Sea by Kaltrina Krasniqi
- Special Jury Prize: La civil by Teodora Mihai
- Award for Best Director: Darezhan Omirbaev for Poet
- Award for Best Actress: Julia Chávez for The Other Tom
- Award for Best Actor: Amir Aghaei, Fatih Al, Barış Yıldız, and Onur Buldu for The Four Walls
- Award for Best Artistic Contribution: Crane Lantern by Hilal Baydarov
- Audience Award: Just Remembering by Matsui Daigo

=== Asian Future ===
- Asian Future Best Film Award: World, Northern Hemisphere by Hossein Tehrani

=== Amazon Prime Video Take One ===
- Amazon Prime Video Take One Award: Sunday & Calm sea by Yunsoo Kim
- Amazon Prime Video Take One Award Special Jury Prize: Midori Sangoumi for Under the Bridge
