= Young Cinema Award =

Venice Film Festival award

The Young Cinema Award (Italian: Premio Arca Cinema Giovani) is a film award given at the Venice Film Festival. The motto of the award is "Spirit of time: a look to the present". The jury consists of one hundred 18- to 25-year-olds from different countries, such as France, Canada, Poland, Hungary, and Italy. The 2016 edition gathered French, Tunisian, and Italian young people.

== Winners ==
The following categories are listed below:

=== Best Italian Film ===
| Year | English Title | Original Title | Director(s) |
|---|---|---|---|
| 2002 | | Due Amici | Spiro Scimone e Francesco Sframeli |
| 2003 | Good Morning, Night | Buongiorno, notte | Marco Bellocchio |
| 2004 | Changing Destiny | Nemmeno il destino | Daniele Gaglianone |
| 2005 | Don't Tell | La bestia nel cuore | Cristina Comencini |
| 2006 | La rieducazione | | Amanda Flor |
| 2007 | Don't Think About It | Non pensarci | Gianni Zanasi |
| 2008 | Mid-August Lunch | Pranzo di ferragosto | Gianni Di Gregorio |
| 2009 | The Double Hour | La doppia ora | Giuseppe Capotondi |
| 2010 | 20 Cigarettes | 20 sigarette | Aureliano Amadei |
| 2011 | The Last Man on Earth | L'ultimo terrestre | Gipi |
| 2012 | The Ideal City | La città ideale | Luigi Lo Cascio |
| 2013 | The Art of Happiness | L'arte della felicità | Alessandro Rak |
| 2014 | Belluscone: A Sicilian Story | Belluscone - una storia siciliana | Franco Maresco |
| 2015 | Burning Love | Pecore in erba | Alberto Caviglia |
| 2016 | Ears | Orecchie | Alessandro Aronadio |
| 2017 | Beautiful Things | | Giorgio Ferrero |
| 2018 | Capri-Revolution | | Mario Martone |
| 2019 | Martin Eden | Martin Eden | Pietro Marcello |
| 2020 | Notturno | | Gianfranco Rosi |
| 2021 | The Hand of God | È stata la mano di Dio | Paolo Sorrentino |
| 2022 | Monica | | Andrea Pallaoro |
| 2023 | El paraíso | | Enrico Maria Artale |
| 2024 | Vittoria | | Alessandro Cassigoli and Casey Kauffman |
| 2025 | | La Grazia | Paolo Sorrentino |

=== Best International Film ===
| Year | English Title | Original Title | Director(s) | Production country |
|---|---|---|---|---|
| 2002 | Magdalene | The Magdalene Sisters | Peter Mullan | United Kingdom, Ireland |
| 2003 | Monsieur Ibrahim | Monsieur Ibrahim et les fleurs du Coran | Francois Dupeyron | France |
| 2004 | The Sea Inside | Mar adentro | Alejandro Amenábar | Spain, France, Italy |
| 2005 | The Constant Gardener | | Fernando Meirelles | United Kingdom, Germany |
| 2006 | Black Book | Zwartboek | Paul Verhoeven | Netherlands, Germany, Belgium, United Kingdom |
| 2007 | The Secret of the Grain | La Graine et le Mulet | Abdellatif Kechiche | France, Tunisia |
| 2008 | The Hurt Locker | | Kathryn Bigelow | United States |
| 2009 | Soul Kitchen | | Fatih Akin | Germany |
| 2010 | The Last Circus | Balada Triste de Trompeta | Álex de la Iglesia | Spain, France |
| 2011 | Shame | | Steve McQueen | United Kingdom, Canada |
| 2012 | The Fifth Season | La Cinquième Saison | Peter Brosens and Jessica Woodworth | Belgium, Netherlands, France |
| 2013 | Miss Violence | | Alexandros Avranas | Greece |
| 2014 | Far from Men | Loin des hommes | David Oelhoffen | France |
| 2015 | Frenzy | Abluka | Emin Alper | Turkey |
| 2016 | Arrival | | Denis Villeneuve | United States |
| 2017 | Foxtrot | פוֹקְסטְרוֹט | Samuel Maoz | Israel, Germany, France, Switzerland |
| 2018 | Never Look Away | Werk ohne Autor | Florian Henckel von Donnersmarck | Germany |
| 2019 | Ema | | Pablo Larraín | Chile |
| 2020 | Pieces of a Woman | | Kornél Mundruczó | Canada, United States, Hungary |
| 2021 | Happening | L'Événement | Audrey Diwan | France |
| 2022 | Athena | | Romain Gavras | France |
| 2023 | Green Border | Zielona granica | Agniezska Holland | Poland, Czech Republic, France, Belgium |
| 2024 | The Brutalist | | Brady Corbet | United States, Hungary, United Kingdom |
| 2025 | The Voice of Hind Rajab | Hind Rajab | Kaouther Ben Hania | France, Tunisia |

=== Other categories ===
==== Alternatives (ALTRE VISIONI AWARD) ====
- 2005 – Lady Vengeance by Park Chan-wook
- 2006 – Offscreen by Christoffer Boe
- 2007 – Sous les bombes by Philippe Aractingi
- 2008 – Sell Out! by Yeo Joon Han

=== Best Digital Film ===
- 2002 Porto Marghera. Inganno Letale by Paolo Bonaldi
- 2004 – Un silenzio particolare by Stefano Rulli

==== SPECIAL AWARD ARCA 18 years ====
- 2019 Tutto il mio folle amore by Gabriele Salvatores
