= Last Chapter =

The Last Chapter may refer to:

- The Last Chapter (1961 film), a 1961 West German drama film directed by Wolfgang Liebeneiner
- Fallada: The Last Chapter, a 1988 East German drama film
- The Last Chapter (TV series), a 2002 Canadian television miniseries
- Terrorizer: The Last Chapter, a 2003 album by Dispatched
- The Last Chapter (album), a 2010 album by R.K.M & Ken-Y
- The Last Chapter (2021 film), a 2021 French-Italian documentary film by Gianluca Matarrese
- The Last Chapter, book by Knut Hamsun
