= Mother lode (disambiguation) =

A mother lode is a principal vein or zone of veins of gold or silver ore.

Mother lode or motherlode may also refer to:

== Music ==
- Motherlode (band), a Canadian pop rock group formed in 1969
- Mother Lode (album), 1974, by Loggins and Messina
- Motherlode (James Brown album), 1988
- Motherlode (Sara Hickman album), 2006
- "Motherlode", a song by Howe II on their 1991 album Now Hear This
- "The Mother Lode", a song from Thom Yorke's 2014 album Tomorrow's Modern Boxes

== Other uses ==
- The California Mother Lode, the main gold deposits of the California Gold Rush
- Mother Lode (1982 film), an adventure film directed by and starring Charlton Heston
- Mother Lode (2021 film), a docufiction film
- "The Mother Lode", an episode of the TV series Prison Break
- Mother Lode (Methow Mountains), a mountain summit located in the North Cascades, in Okanogan County, Washington
- The Motherlode, a climbing area in the Pendergrass-Murray Recreational Preserve of Red River Gorge, Kentucky

== See also ==
- "The Motherload", a 2014 song by Mastodon
- Super Motherload, a 2013 video game developed by XGen Studios
- "Mother's Load", an episode of Motherland
