= Kaltrina =

Kaltrina is a feminine given name. Notable people with the name include:

- Kaltrina Biqkaj (born 2000), Kosovar footballer
- Kaltrina Krasniqi (born 1981), Kosovar film director
- Kaltrina Neziri, Kosovar model and beauty pageant titleholder
