= Alma Noce =

Italian actress

- Noce in 2026
- Born: 29 October 1999 (age 27); Turin, Piedmont, Italy
- Occupation: Actress
- Years active: 2007 - present
- Website: dibertiec.com/portfolio/alma-noce

Alma Noce is an Italian actress, born in 1999, best known for playing Beatrice Brandiforti in the award-winning Sky Atlantic series The Art of Joy and Nadia in The Girl Flew. She has a particular passion for avant-garde cinema and independent films. She also expressed her interests in directing and screenwriting, and in advocating for gender equality in the film industry

Apart from acting, Noce has pursued an interest in modeling, appearing in several magazines, starring short promotional films for Dior and Bulgari, and collaborating with photographers across Italy.

== Early life and education ==
Alma Noce was born and raised in San Salvario, Turin. She received her first audition invitation at the age of five, but had to turn it down when she moved to Thailand with her mother for a year and a half. She later landed her first role at seven, sparking a lifelong passion for acting. Although she has never received formal acting training, her co-star Gianni Morandi praised her as "the most talented of all". Due to an injury, she had to give up ballet, horseback riding, and rowing.

She attended the Liceo Classico high school and completed her studies privately, balancing her education with the filming of L'isola di Pietro. She is bilingual and fluent in both Italian and English.

== Career ==
Alma Noce began her career as a child actress, appearing in various Italian television programs and films such as Dracula 3D, Qualunque cosa succeda and Fuoriclasse.

Her breakthrough came at the age of 16, when she played Caterina Rovandi, a prominent role in the TV series L'isola di Pietro, starring alongside Gianni Morandi, who portrayed her grandfather.

In 2020, she landed her first significant role in cinema, portraying the teenage version of Gemma in The Best Years. She later took on her first leading role in The Girl Flew, which premiered in the Horizons Extra sidebar at the 78th Venice International Film Festival.

In 2024, Noce gained widespread recognition for her performance in The Art of Joy, a television series directed by Valeria Golino. Her role earned her the Nobis Foundation Award at the 2025 Nastro d'Argento as the most talented young actress.

== Filmography ==
=== Film ===
Year	Title	Role	Notes
2010	Gladiator Games	Goddess	
2012	Dracula 3D	Marika	
2015	Avengers: Age of Ultron	Sokovian Family	
2020	The Best Years	Teenage Gemma	
2020	Le mythe Dior	Nymph	Short film
2021	The Girl Flew	Nadia	
2022	Brado	Rachele	
2022	Time Is Up 2: Game of Love	Anna	
2026	God Laughs	Countess Isabella	
TBA	Punk State †	Nina	Post-production; also producer
TBA	Il sopravvissuto †	TBA	In production

=== Television ===
Year	Title	Role	Notes
2017–2019	L'isola di Pietro	Caterina Rovandi	Main role
2025	The Art of Joy	Beatrice	4 episodes

== Awards and nominations ==
Award	Year	Category	Work	Result	Ref.
Premio Atena Nike	2022	Best Young Actress(Under 30)	The Girl Flew	Nominated	
Nastro d'Argento	2025	Premio Nobis	The Art of Joy (TV series)	Won	
