= Erasing Frank =

2021 Hungarian film

- Directed by: Gábor Fabricius
- Screenplay by: Gábor Fabricius
- Produced by: Klementina Remeikaite
- Cinematography: Narvydas Naujalis
- Edited by: Laurynas Bareisa
- Release date: 2021
- Language: Hungarian

Erasing Frank (Hungarian: Eltörölni Frankot) is a 2021 Hungarian drama film written and directed by Gábor Fabricius.

The film premiered in the Venice International Critics' Week sidebar at the 78th edition of the Venice Film Festival, winning the Circolo del Cinema di Verona Award as most innovative film. It also won the Special Jury Award at the 2022 Pune International Film Festival.

== Cast ==
- Benjamin Fuchs: Róbert Frank
- Kincsö Blénesi: Hanna Kiss
- Andrea Waskovich: Anna Goldschmidt
- István Lénárt: Jenö Erös
- Zsigmond Gerlóczy: Ezé
- Péter Iványi: Pravda
