= Vittoria (film) =

2024 film

- Directed by: Alessandro Cassigoli; Casey Kauffman
- Written by: Alessandro Cassigoli; Casey Kauffman
- Produced by: Lorenzo Cioffi; Giorgio Giampà; Nanni Moretti
- Starring: Marilena Amato
- Cinematography: Melissa Nocetti
- Edited by: Alessandro Cassigoli
- Music by: Giorgio Giampà
- Release date: 30 August 2024 (Venice)
- Language: Italian

Vittoria is a 2024 Italian drama film written and directed by Alessandro Cassigoli and Casey Kauffman. It premiered at the 81st edition of the Venice Film Festival.

== Cast ==
- Marilena Amato as Jasmine
- Gennaro Scarica as Rino
- Nina Lorenza Ciano as Vittoria

== Production ==
The second feature film of Cassigoli and Kauffman, Vittoria was produced by Zoe Films, Sacher Film, Scarabeo Entertainment and Ladoc with Rai Cinema. The film is a dramatization of real life events of the non-professional leading actress Marilena Amato, a hairdresser from Torre Annunziata who had already appeared in a minor role in the filmmakers' previous film, Californie. This is the filmmakers' third film set in Torre Annunziata, following Californie and the documentary Butterfly.

== Release ==
The film had its world premiere at the 81st Venice International Film Festival in the Orizzonti Extra sidebar. It was released in Italian cinemas on 3 October 2024.

== Reception ==
Screen International's film critic Lee Marshall praised the film, writing: "although Vittoria is grounded in an intensely real place, there is a more than a touch of the fable about a story which is scripted with admirable efficiency, one in which single scenes speak volumes". Amber Wilkinson from Eye For Film described the film as an "authentic and heartfelt drama" in which "Cassigoli and Kauffman capture the muscle of family life as it bends, stretches and, from time to time strains, to accommodate all of its members, all supported by a lyrical piano-driven score from Giorgio Giampà".

The film won the "Golden Alexander – Michel Demopoulos" Award for Best Feature Film at the 2024 Thessaloniki Film Festival, and the award for Best screenplay at the 2024 Cairo International Film Festival.
