= They Carry Death =

2021 film

- Directed by: Helena Girón; Samuel M. Delgado
- Screenplay by: Helena Girón; Samuel M. Delgado
- Produced by: Beli Martínez
- Cinematography: José Alayón
- Edited by: Manuel Muñoz Rivas
- Music by: Camilo Sanabria
- Release date: 2021
- Languages: Galician; Spanish

They Carry Death (Galician: Eles transportan a morte) is a 2021 Spanish-Colombian drama film written and directed by Helena Girón and Samuel M. Delgado, at their feature film debut. It is inspired by Silvia Federici's essay Caliban and the Witch: Women, Body and Primitive Accumulation.

The film premiered at the 78th edition of the Venice Film Festival, in the Venice International Critics' Week sidebar.

== Cast ==
- Xoán Reices
- Valentín Estévez
- David Pantaleón
- Sara Ferro
- Nuria Lestegás

== Reception ==
On the review aggregator website Rotten Tomatoes, 100% of 5 critics' reviews are positive, with an average rating of 8.50/10.
