= Queer Edward II =

2026 British documentary film

- Directed by: Theo Rollason
- Produced by: Ben Fowlie; Sebastien Rabas; Michael Sherman; John Gore
- Cinematography: Seamus McGarvey
- Edited by: Theo Rollason; Nicole Hálová
- Music by: Simon Fisher Turner
- Production companies: Lightborn Films; March 13th; John Gore Studios
- Release date: 4 September 2026 (Venice)
- Running time: 97 minutes
- Country: United Kingdom
- Language: English

Queer Edward II is an 2026 British documentary film directed by Theo Rollason. It follows Derek Jarman during the production of Edward II (1991).

The film had its world premiere out of competition of the 83rd Venice International Film Festival on 4 September 2026, and won the Queer Lion.

== Premise ==
Follows Derek Jarman during the production of Edward II (1991).

== Production ==
The film uses over 30 hours of footage shot by Seamus McGarvey during the production of Edward II, with McGarvey being delighted the footage was being turned into a film. Sandy Powell, Tilda Swinton, Christine Vachon and Russell Tovey are among the executive producers.

== Release ==
Creative & production team at 2026 BFI London Film Festival, 11 October 2026.

The film had its world premiere out of competition of the 83rd Venice International Film Festival on 4 September 2026, where it won the Queer Lion. It was also screened at the 2026 BFI London Film Festival on 11 October 2026 where it was given Special Jury Mention in the Grierson Documentary Award.
