= 78th Venice International Film Festival =

Italian film festival in 2021

- Official festival poster by Lorenzo Mattotti.
- Opening film: Parallel Mothers
- Closing film: The Hidden Child
- Location: Venice, Italy
- Founded: 1932
- Awards: Golden Lion: Happening
- Hosted by: Serena Rossi
- Artistic director: Alberto Barbera
- Festival date: 1 – 11 September 2021
- Website: www.labiennale.org/en/cinema/2021

Venice Film Festival chronology
- 79th 77th

The 78th annual Venice International Film Festival was held from 1 to 11 September 2021, at Venice Lido in Italy. This edition marked the festival's return to its full format following the COVID-19 epidemic during the prior year.

South Korean director Bong Joon-ho was the Jury President of the main competition, marking the first time a South Korean director has been picked as the festival's top juror. Serena Rossi hosted the opening and closing nights. The Golden Lion was awarded to Happening by Audrey Diwan.

The festival opened with Parallel Mothers by Pedro Almodóvar, and closed with The Hidden Child by Roberto Andò.

== Juries ==
=== Main Competition (Venezia 78) ===
- Bong Joon-ho, South Korean filmmaker - Jury President
- Saverio Costanzo, Italian filmmaker
- Virginie Efira, Belgian actress
- Cynthia Erivo, British actress and singer
- Sarah Gadon, Canadian actress
- Alexander Nanau, Romanian-German director
- Chloé Zhao, Chinese-American filmmaker

=== Orizzonti ===
- Jasmila Žbanić, Bosnian filmmaker and producer - Jury President
- Mona Fastvold, Norwegian filmmaker and actress
- Shahram Mokri, Iranian filmmaker
- Josh Siegel, director of the cinema department of MoMA
- Nadia Terranova, Italian novelist

=== Luigi De Laurentiis Award for a Debut Film ===
- Uberto Pasolini, Italian director and producer - Jury President
- Martin Schweighofer, Austrian film critic
- Amalia Ulman, Argentine visual artist

=== Venice VR Expanded ===
- Michelle Kranot, Israeli filmmaker - Jury President
- Maria Grazia Mattei, Italian art critic
- Jonathan Yeo, British artist

== Official Sections ==
=== In Competition ===
The following films were selected for the main competition:

English title	Original title	Director(s)	Production country
America Latina		Damiano D'Innocenzo and Fabio D'Innocenzo	Italy
Another World	Un autre monde	Stéphane Brizé	France
The Box	La caja	Lorenzo Vigas	Mexico, United States
Captain Volkonogov Escaped	Капитан Волконогов бежал	Aleksey Chupov and Natalya Merkulova	Russia
The Card Counter		Paul Schrader	United States
Freaks Out		Gabriele Mainetti	Italy, Belgium
The Hand of God	È stata la mano di Dio	Paolo Sorrentino	Italy
Happening	L'Événement	Audrey Diwan	France
Il buco		Michelangelo Frammartino	Italy, France, Germany
Leave No Traces	Żeby nie było śladów	Jan P. Matuszyński	Poland, France, Czech Republic
The Lost Daughter		Maggie Gyllenhaal	United States, Greece
Lost Illusions	Illusions perdues	Xavier Giannoli	France
Mona Lisa and the Blood Moon		Ana Lily Amirpour	United States
Official Competition	Competencia oficial	Gastón Duprat and Mariano Cohn	Spain
On the Job: The Missing 8		Erik Matti	Philippines
Parallel Mothers (opening film)	Madres paralelas	Pedro Almodóvar	Spain
The Power of the Dog		Jane Campion	United Kingdom, Australia, United States, Canada, New Zealand
The King of Laughter	Qui rido io	Mario Martone	Italy, Spain
Reflection	Відблиск	Valentyn Vasyanovych	Ukraine
Spencer		Pablo Larraín	United States, United Kingdom, Germany, Chile
Sundown		Michel Franco	Mexico, France, Sweden

=== Out of Competition ===
The following films were selected to be screened out of competition:

English title	Original title	Director(s)	Production country
Fiction
The Accusation	Les Choses Humaines	Yvan Attal	France
The Catholic School	La scuola cattolica	Stefano Mordini	Italy
Dune		Denis Villeneuve	United States
Halloween Kills		David Gordon Green	United States
The Hidden Child (closing film)	Il bambino nascosto	Roberto Andò	Italy, France
The Inner Cage	Ariaferma	Leonardo Di Costanzo	Italy, Switzerland
The Last Duel		Ridley Scott	United Kingdom, United States
Last Night in Soho		Edgar Wright	United Kingdom
Old Henry		Potsy Ponciroli	United States
Non Fiction
Becoming Led Zeppelin (working in progress)		Bernard MacMahon	United States
Deandré#Deandré Storio di un Impiegato		Roberta Lena	Italy
Django & Django		Luca Rea	Italy
Ennio		Giuseppe Tornatore	Italy, Belgium, Japan, Holland
Ezio Bosso: Le cose che restano		Giorgio Verdelli	Italy
Hallelujah: Leonard Cohen, A Journey, A Song		Daniel Geller and Dayna Goldfine	United States
Life of Crime 1984-2020		Jon Alpert	United States
Republic of Silence		Diana El Jeiroudi	France, Germany, Syria
Tranchées		Loup Bureau	France
Viaggio Nel Crepuscolo		Augusto Contento	France, Italy
Series
Scenes from a Marriage (5 episodes)		Hagai Levi	United States
Special Screenings
GES‑2		Nastia Korkia	Russia
Pietro il grande		Antonello Sarno	Italy
Ricostruire insieme – Biennale Architettura 2021		Graziano Conversano	Italy
Short Films
The Night	良夜不能留	Tsai Ming-liang	Taiwan
Plastic Semiotic		Radu Jude	Romania
Sad Film		Vasili	Myanmar, Netherlands

=== Orizzonti ===
The following films were selected for the Horizons (Orizzonti) section:

English title	Original title	Director(s)	Production country
107 Mothers	Cenzorka	Peter Kerekes	Slovakia, Czech Republic, Ukraine
Amira	أميرة	Mohamed Diab	Egypt, Jordan, United Arab Emirates, Saudi Arabia
Anatomy of Time	เวลา	Jakrawal Nilthamrong	Thailand, France, Netherlands, Singapore, Germany
Atlantide		Yuri Ancarani	Italy, France, United States, Qatar
The Falls	瀑布	Chung Mong-hong	Taiwan
Full Time	À Plein Temps	Éric Gravel	France
The Great Movement	El Gran Movimiento	Kiro Russo	Bolivia, France, Qatar, Switzerland
The Hole in the Fence	El hoyo en la cerca	Joaquín del Paso	Mexico, Poland
Inu-Oh	犬王	Masaaki Yuasa	Japan
Miracle	Miracol	Bogdan George Apetri	Romania, Czech Republic, Latvia
Once Upon a Time in Calcutta	Mayanagar	Aditya Vikram Sengupta	India, France, Norway
The Other Tom	El otro Tom	Rodrigo Plá	Mexico, United States
The Peacock's Paradise	Il Paradiso del Pavone	Laura Bispuri	Italy, Germany
Pilgrims	Piligrimai	Laurynas Bareiša	Lithuania
Promises	Les Promesses	Thomas Kruithof	France
True Things		Harry Wootliff	United Kingdom
Vera Dreams of the Sea	Vera Andrron Detin	Kaltrina Krasniqi	Kosovo, Albania, North Macedonia
White Building	Bodeng Sar	Kavich Neang	Cambodia, France, China, Qatar
Rhino	Носоріг	Oleh Sentsov	Ukraine, Poland, Germany

=== Orizzonti Extra ===
The following films were selected to the Orizzonti Extra section:

English title	Original title	Director(s)	Production country
7 Prisoners	7 Prisioneiros	Alexandre Moratto	Brasil
The Blind Man Who Did Not Want to See Titanic	Sokea mies, joka ei halunnut nähdä Titanicia	Teemu Nikki	Finland
Costa Brava, Lebanon	كوستا برافا، لبنان	Mounia Akl	Lebanon, France, Qatar, Spain, Sweden
The Girl Flew	La ragazza ha volato	Wilma Labate	Italy, Slovenia
Land of Dreams		Shirin Neshat and Shoja Azari	United States, Germany, Qatar
La macchina delle immagini di Alfredo C.		Roland Sejko	Italy
Mama, I'm Home	Мама, я дома	Vladimir Bitokov	Russia
My Night	Ma Nuit	Antoinette Boulat	France, Belgium

=== Biennale College - Cinema ===
The following films were selected for the Biennale College - Cinema section.

English Title	Original Title	Director(s)	Production Country
Al Oriente		José María Avilés	Ecuador
Blessed Boys	La Santa Piccola	Silvia Brunelli	Italy
The Cathedral		Ricky D'Ambrose	United States
Lavrynthos (VR)		Fabito Rychter and Amir Admoni	Brazil, Peru
Our Father, the Devil		Ellie Foumbi	United States, France
Our Happiest Days	Nuestros Días Más Felices	Sol Berruezo Pichon-Rivière	Argentine, Italy
La Tana		Beatrice Baldacci	Italy

== Independent Sections ==
=== Venice International Critics' Week ===
The lineup of films selected for the 36th Venice International Critics' Week is as follows:

English title	Original title	Director(s)	Production country
In Competition
They Carry Death	Eles transportan a morte	Samuel M. Delgado, Helena Girón	Spain, Colombia
Erasing Frank	Eltörölni Frankot	Gábor Fabricius	Hungary
Mondocane		Alessandro Celli	Italy
Mother Lode		Matteo Tortone	France, Italy, Switzerland
Detours	Obchodnye puti	Ekaterina Selenkina	Russia
The Salamander	A salamandra	Alex Carvalho	Brazil, France, Germany
Zalava		Arsalan Amiri	Iran
Out of Competition
Karmalink (opening film)		Jake Wachtel	Cambodia, United States
The Last Chapter (closing film)	La Dernière Séance	Gianluca Matarrese	Italy, France

=== Giornate degli Autori ===
The following films were selected for the Giornate degli Autori section:

English title	Original title	Director(s)	Production country
In Competition
Anatomy	Anatomia	Ola Jankowska	Poland, France
Californie		Alessandro Cassigoli, Casey Kauffman	Italy
Private Desert	Deserto Particular	Aly Muritiba	Brazil, Portugal
Madeleine Collins		Antoine Barraud	France, Belgium, Switzerland
The Stranger	Al-Ḡarīb	Ameer Fakher Eldin	Syria, Germany, Palestine, Qatar
Immaculate	Imaculat	Monica Stan, George Chiper-Lillemark	Romania
Dusk Stone	Piedra noche	Iván Fund	Argentina, Chile, Spain
Shen Kong		Chen Guan	China
Out of Sync	Tres	Juanjo Giménez	Spain, Lithuania, Germany
You Resemble Me	Tu me ressembles	Dina Amer	Egypt, France, United States
Out of competition
Lovely Boy		Francesco Lettieri	Italy
Special events
The Forgotten Ones	Mizrahim, les oubliés de la terre promise	Michale Boganim	France, Israel
Il Palazzo		Federica Di Giacomo	Italy, Czech Republic
Senza fine		Elisa Fuksas	Italy
The Great Silence	Il silenzio grande	Alessandro Gassmann	Italy, Poland
Three Minutes: A Lengthening		Bianca Stigter	Netherlands
Venice Nights
Caveman		Tommaso Landucci	Italy, Switzerland
Cùntami		Giovanna Taviani	Italy
Fellini and the Shadow	Fellini e l'ombra	Catherine McGilvray	Italy, Switzerland
Giulia		Ciro De Caro	Italy
Hugo in Argentina		Stefano Knuchel	Switzerland
Isolation		Michele Placido, Julia von Heinz, Olivier Guerpillon, Jaco Van Dormael, Michael Winterbottom	Italy, Germany, Belgium, Sweden, United Kingdom
Our Ghosts	I nostri fantasmi	Alessandro Capitani	Italy
Princesa		Stefania Muresu	Italy
Sons of Cain	Les Enfants de Caïn	Keti Stamo	France, Albania, Italy
Spin Time		Sabina Guzzanti	Italy
Tonino de Bernardi - Un tempo, un incontro		Daniele Segre	Italy
Welcome Venice		Andrea Segre	Italy
With or Without You	Una relazione	Stefano Sardo	Italy
The World in Shots	Il mondo a scatti	Cecilia Mangini, Paolo Pisanelli	Italy
Women's Tales Project
#21. Shangri-La		Isabel Sandoval	Italy, United States
#22. I and the Stupid Boy		Kaouther Ben Hania	Italy, France

== Official Awards ==
The following official awards were presented at the 78th Edition:

=== In Competition ===
- Golden Lion: Happening by Audrey Diwan
- Grand Jury Prize: The Hand of God by Paolo Sorrentino
- Silver Lion: The Power of the Dog by Jane Campion
- Volpi Cup for Best Actress: Penélope Cruz for Parallel Mothers
- Volpi Cup for Best Actor: John Arcilla for On the Job: The Missing 8
- Best Screenplay: The Lost Daughter by Maggie Gyllenhaal
- Special Jury Prize: Il buco by Michelangelo Frammartino
- Marcello Mastroianni Award: Filippo Scotti for The Hand of God

=== Golden Lion for Lifetime Achievement ===
- Roberto Benigni
- Jamie Lee Curtis

=== Horizons (Orizzonti) ===
- Best Film: Pilgrims by Laurynas Bareisa
- Best Director: Full Time by Éric Gravel
- Special Jury Prize: The Great Movement by Kiro Russo
- Best Actress: Laure Calamy for Full Time
- Best Actor: Piseth Chhun for White Building
- Best Screenplay: 107 Mothers by Peter Kerekes
- Best Short Film: The Bones by Cristóbal León and Joaquín Cociña
- Armani Beauty Audience Award: The Blind Man Who Did Not Want to See Titanic by Teemu Nikki

=== Luigi De Laurentiis Award for a Debut Film (Lion of the Future) ===
- Immaculate by George Chiper-Lillemark and Monica Stan

== Independent Sections Awards ==
The following awards were presented by independent juries:

=== Venice International Critics' Week ===
- Grand Prize: Zalava by Arsalan Amiri
- Mario Serandrei: They Carry Death by Samuel M. Delgado and Helena Girón
- Best Short Film: Inchei by Federico Demattè
- Best Director: Inchei by Federico Demattè
- Best Technical Contribution: L'Incanto by Chiara Caterina

=== Giornarte degli Autori ===
- GdA Director's Award: Immaculate by George Chiper-Lillemark and Monica Stan
- Europa Cinemas Label Award: Californie by Alessandro Cassigoli and Casey Kauffman

== Independent Awards ==
=== Queer Lion ===
- The Last Chapter by Gianluca Matarrese

=== Arca CinemaGiovani Award ===
- Best Italian Film: The Hand of God by Paolo Sorrentino
- Venezia 78 Best Film: Happening by Audrey Diwan

=== Authors under 40 Award ===
- Best Director: Vera Dreams of the Sea by Kaltrina Krasniqi
- Best Screenplay: Immaculate by George Chiper-Lillemark and Monica Stan

=== BNL Gruppo BNP Paribas People's Choice Award ===
- Privat Desert by Aly Muritiba

=== Brian Award ===
- Happening by Audrey Diwan

=== Casa Wabi – Mantarraya Award ===
- Immaculate by George Chiper-Lillemark and Monica Stan

=== CICT - UNESCO "Enrico Fulchignoni" Award ===
- Amira by Mohamed Diab

=== Edipo Re Award ===
- Al Garib by Amer Fakher Eldin
- Vera Dreams of the Sea by Kaltrina Krasniqi

=== Fanheart3 Award ===
- Graffetta d'Oro for Best Film: Freaks Out by Gabriele Mainetti
- Nave d’Argento for Best OTP: Mona Lisa and the Blood Moon by Ana Lily Amirpour
- VR Fan Experience: Knot: A Trilogy by Glen Neath and David Rosenberg
- Special Mention: Old Henry by Potsy Ponciroli

=== FEDIC Award ===
- Il buco by Michelangelo Frammartino
  - Special mention: The Girl Flew by Wilma Labate

=== FIPRESCI Awards ===
- Best Film (main competition): Happening by Audrey Diwan
- Best Film (other sections): Zalava by Arsalan Amiri

=== Fondazione Mimmo Rotella Award ===
- Mario Martone and Toni Servillo for The King of Laughter

=== Francesco Pasinetti Award ===
- Best Film: The Hand of God by Paolo Sorrentino
- Best Actor:
  - Leonardo Di Costanzo for The Inner Cage
  - Toni Servillo for The Hand of God and The King of Laughter
- Best Actress: Teresa Saponangelo for The Hand of God

=== Green Drop Award ===
- Il buco by Michelangelo Frammartino

=== Leoncino d'Oro Award ===
- Freaks Out by Gabriele Mainetti

=== Lizzani Award ===
- Freaks Out by Gabriele Mainetti

=== Premio Fondazione Fai Persona Lavoro Ambiente ===
- El Gran Movimiento by Kiro Russo
  - Special mention: Costa Brava, Lebanon by Mounia Akl
  - Special mention: 7 Prisoners by Alexandre Moratto
  - Special mention: Full Time by Éric Gravel

=== Nuovoimaie Talent Award ===
- Best New Young Actor: Filippo Scotti for The Hand of God
- Best New Young Actress: Aurora Giovinazzo for Freaks Out

=== La Pellicola d'Oro Award ===
- Best Visual Effects: Maurizio Corridori for Freaks Out
- Best Gaffer: Loris Felici for Freaks Out
- Best Camera Operator: Luca Massa for Il buco
- Best Costume Tailoring: Tirelli for The King of Laughter

=== Premio Soundtrack Stars Award ===
- Best Soundtrack: Freaks Out by Gabriele Mainetti
  - Special Mention: Mona Lisa and the Blood Moon by Ana Lily Amirpour
- Lifetime Achievement Award: Ornella Vanoni

=== Premio UNIMED ===
- The Hand of God by Paolo Sorrentino

=== Premio Fair Play al Cinema - Vivere da Sportivi ===
- Il buco by Michelangelo Frammartino
  - Special mention: The Card Counter by Paul Schrader

=== RB Casting Award ===
- Aurora Giovinazzo for Freaks Out

=== Sfera 1932 Award ===
- The Box by Lorenzo Vigas

=== SIGNIS Award ===
- Another World by Stéphane Brizé
  - Special mention: The Hand of God by Paolo Sorrentino

=== Smithers Foundation Award "Ambassador of Hope" ===
- Life of Crime 1984-2020 by Jon Alpert

=== “Sorriso Diverso Venezia Award” XI edition ===
- Best Italian Film: Freaks Out by Gabriele Mainetti
- Best Foreign Film: 7 Prisoners by Alexandre Moratto

=== 10th INTERFILM Award for Promoting Interreligious Dialogue ===
- Amira by Mohamed Diab

=== Verona Film Club Award ===
- Erasing Frank by Gàbor Fabricius
