= Private Desert =

2021 film

- Promotional release poster
- Portuguese: Deserto Particular
- Directed by: Aly Muritiba
- Written by: Aly Muritiba; Henrique Dos Santos
- Produced by: Luís Galvão Teles; Antonio Gonçalves Junior
- Starring: Antonio Saboia; Pedro Fasanaro
- Cinematography: Luis Armando Arteaga
- Edited by: Patricia Saramago
- Music by: Felipe Ayres
- Production companies: Grafo Audiovisual; Fado Filmes
- Distributed by: Pandora Filmes
- Release date: 2 September 2021 (Venice)
- Running time: 120 minutes
- Countries: Brazil; Portugal
- Language: Portuguese
- Box office: $34,314

Private Desert (Portuguese: Deserto Particular) is a 2021 drama film directed by Aly Muritiba. It was selected as the Brazilian entry for the Best International Feature Film at the 94th Academy Awards, but it was not nominated.

== Plot ==
After he is fired for violence, a policeman searches the country for his online lover who unexpectedly disappeared.

== Cast ==
- Antonio Saboia as Daniel
- Pedro Fasanaro as Sara

== Reception ==
=== Reviews ===
On the review aggregator website Rotten Tomatoes, 89% of 35 critics' reviews are positive, with an average rating of 7.5/10. The website's consensus reads: "Private Desert demands patience -- and rewards it with an affecting romance that smartly interrogates masculine stereotypes." Metacritic assigned the film a weighted average score of 66 out of 100, based on 7 critics, indicating "generally favorable reviews".

In his review for Variety, Manuel Betancourt said that "this Brazilian drama is a welcome and assured intervention into that country's calcified ideals about desire and masculinity."

=== Oscars submission ===
After the announcement of the film's selection for the 2022 Oscars, on 14 October, Waldemar Dalenogare Neto declared he was rooting for the film, but criticized on Twitter the way in which the choice was made, with a three-week delay and an extensive list of titles discussed at the last minute. It was later announced that the film's director and crew had traveled to the United States to present the film at film festivals and special screenings.

On 7 December 2021, Kino Lorber announced the acquisition of the film's distribution rights for Canada and the United States.

On 9 December, Dalenogare published a video review on YouTube, rating the film an 8/10 and said that of the 12 titles (out of 15) he had watched that were pre-selected to represent Brazil at the Oscars, Deserto Particular was the best. Still in the review, he pointed out the fact that he had previously sent the Brazilian Academy of Cinema an email asking it to make the choice of the film to represent the country at the Oscars sooner, because the nominees need, in addition to quality, a lot of campaign in the United States, and Brazil was one of the last countries to send the chosen title. With zero response, Brazil lost time due to the three weeks that the Brazilian academy reserves just to fill out a registration form.

On 21 December 2021, director Aly Muritiba posted on Twitter about the experience of the film's campaign in the United States: "One of the things I learned is that it's about cinema planning, timing, support and money. It's not enough to have a good movie." Aly Muritiba also mentioned in his series of tweets the millions of dollars that South Korea spent to promote Parasite (which won an Oscar in 2020) and asked ANCINE (the official cinema agency of the Brazilian federal government) to think about "the creation of a line of funding to finance the campaign of the next films chosen for the race" so as not to be "deluding".

When placing and commenting on the film on her YouTube favorites list of 2021, Isabela Boscov said that the film did not make the Oscar final list due to lack of campaign, "but they don't know what they missed". In the same video, Boscov mentioned First Cow's Oscar snub: "It's further proof that the Academy (which organizes the Oscars) can't see anything they don't put right up their nose (with campaign)."

=== Possible movie spoiler in the press ===
There is a feature of one of the characters in the film that was not disclosed in the film's campaign in Brazil, so it could be considered a spoiler, but such detail appeared in an advertisement in the United States. In Brazil, Isabela Boscov reported this detail in her YouTube video review and said that it does not interfere with the film experience, Waldemar Dalenogare Neto chose not to mention it.

The distributor's website in the United States reveals the spoiler in the synopsis, but the one in Brazil does not.

== See also ==
- List of submissions to the 94th Academy Awards for Best International Feature Film
- List of Brazilian submissions for the Academy Award for Best International Feature Film
