= José (film) =

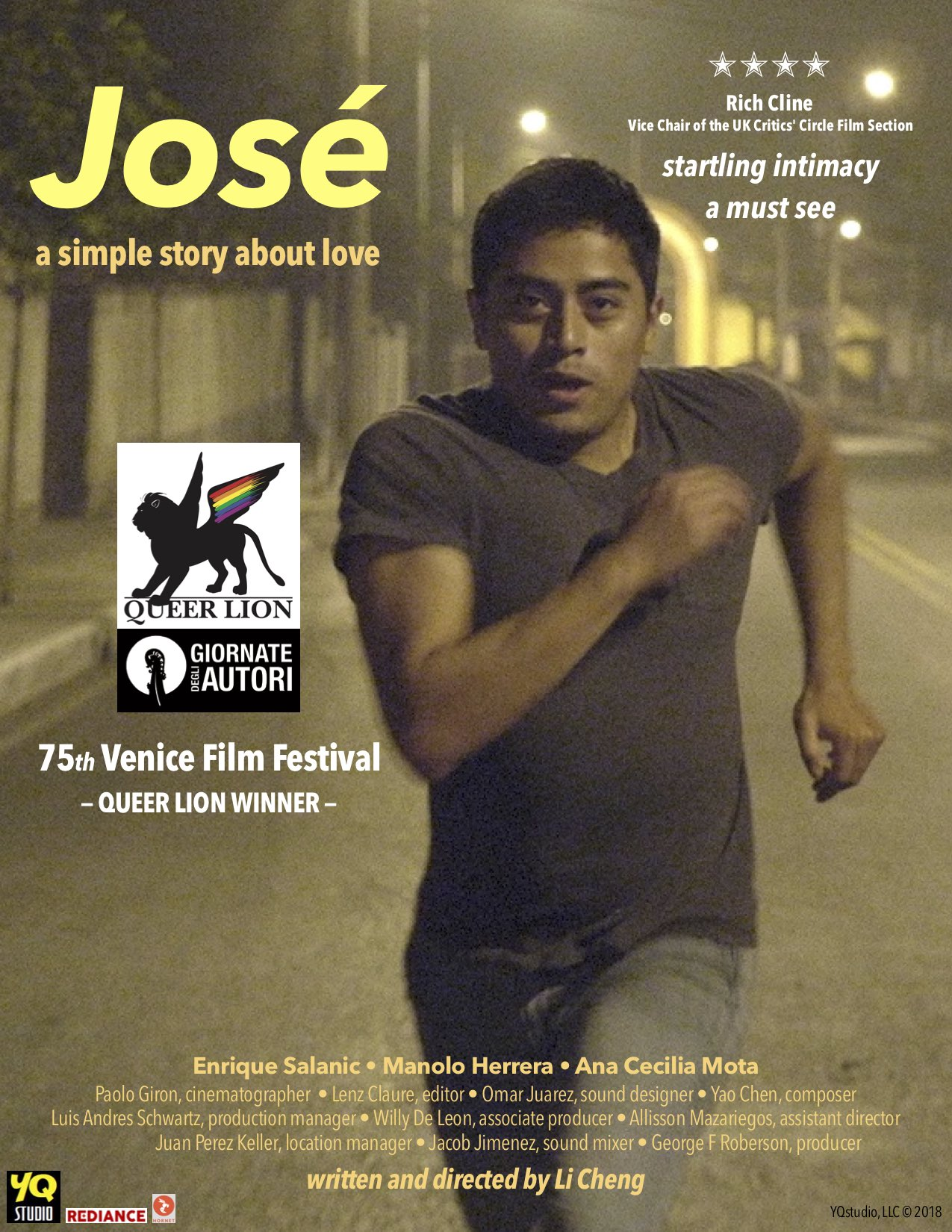
- Directed by: Li Cheng
- Written by: Li Cheng; George F Roberson
- Produced by: George F Roberson; Li Cheng
- Starring: Enrique Salanic; Manolo Herrera; Ana Cecilia Mota
- Cinematography: Paolo Giron
- Edited by: Lenz Claure
- Music by: Yao Chen
- Production company: YQstudio
- Release date: 6 September 2018 (Venice)
- Running time: 85 minutes
- Countries: Guatemala; USA
- Language: Spanish
- Box office: $26,563

José is a Guatemalan feature-film social-drama by Li Cheng. It was first shown at the 75th Venice Film Festival in the Giornate degli Autori section on 6 September 2018. It is the first Guatemala and Central America film ever presented in Venice Film Festival.

The film follows a young gay man who lives with his mother in Guatemala City where he works a low income job and faces economic hardship living in a country with conservative social norms. He meets another man, Luis, which he falls in love with and that changes his life through the aspect of questioning his identity and self-reflection of his emotional intimacy. The coming-of-age film grapples with the realities of being an LGBTQ+ person searching for love in a highly religious and homophobic country.

== Cast ==
- Enrique Salanic as José
- Manolo Herrera as Luis
- Ana Cecelia Mota as Mom
- Jhakelyn Waleska Gonzalez Gonzalez as Monica
- Esteban Lopez Ramirez as Carlos
- Juan Andres Molina Cardona as Juan

== Reception ==
The Hollywood Reporter reviewer wrote of "a tender observational quality backed by confident visual sense" and the "unabashed treatment of gay sex and nudity", while Rich Cline called it "earthy and honest".

The film had its U.S. premiere at the Santa Barbara International Film Festival in 2019.

Overall, the film received positive reviews from critics and viewers. Many said that the portrayal was realistic of Guatemalan life. Reviewers highlighted how the film was able to focus on real challenges that LGBTQ+ individuals face in these parts of the world where there is poverty and hard social expectations. The style of everyday experiences was well received. Some even commented emphasizing the emotional impact of the protagonist's relationship and his exploration of identity.

== Awards ==
José was awarded the Queer Lion on 7 September 2018. The film won Best Spanish Language Film at the Santa Barbara International Film Festival in 2019.

== Themes ==
Critics noted that this film captures economic marginalization and social constraint in Guatemala. Additionally, Latin America cinema scholars argue that films like José capture intersectionality specifically like poverty and sexuality within constrained environments. The relationship between José and Luis show the tension between the duality of self identity and societal norms. Furthermore, the film also shows broader trends in Central American queer cinema which often represents realistic portrayals of LGBTQ+ and their everyday experience. Nonetheless, one of the main aspects of the film is how it has been able to interpret and represent how identity forms and prospers within the walls of restrictive social structures.

== Director Background ==
The director of José, Li Cheng, is a Chinese born, American citizen filmmaker and scholar. He pursued filmmaking at the New York Film Academy and he also earned a PhD in cancer research. Cheng selected Guatemala for the setting of the movie because after he researched many countries he found that Guatemala's large youth population and social inequality could be key factors for the movie. Due to this the setting is able to reflect the intended effort to depict the everyday life and social constrictions within this specific region.
