= Queer Lion =

Venice Film Festival award

- Leone Queer (Italian)
- Location: Venice
- Country: Italy
- Presented by: Venice Film Festival
- First award: 2007
- Currently held by: Victor Di Marco and Márcio Picoli for London; Theo Rollason for Queer Edward II (2026)
- Website: queerlion.it/cinema

The Queer Lion (Italian: Leone Queer) is an annual independent prize awarded at the Venice Film Festival, since 2007, to the Best Queer Feature Film. A jury composed of journalists, filmmaker, and artists is usually formed before the festival to assign the winner.

All the movies containing LGBTQ themes presented in any of the sections of the festival (Main Competition, Out of Competition, Orizzonti, Venice Spotlight, Giornate degli Autori, and Settimana Internazionale della Critica) are eligible for the prize.

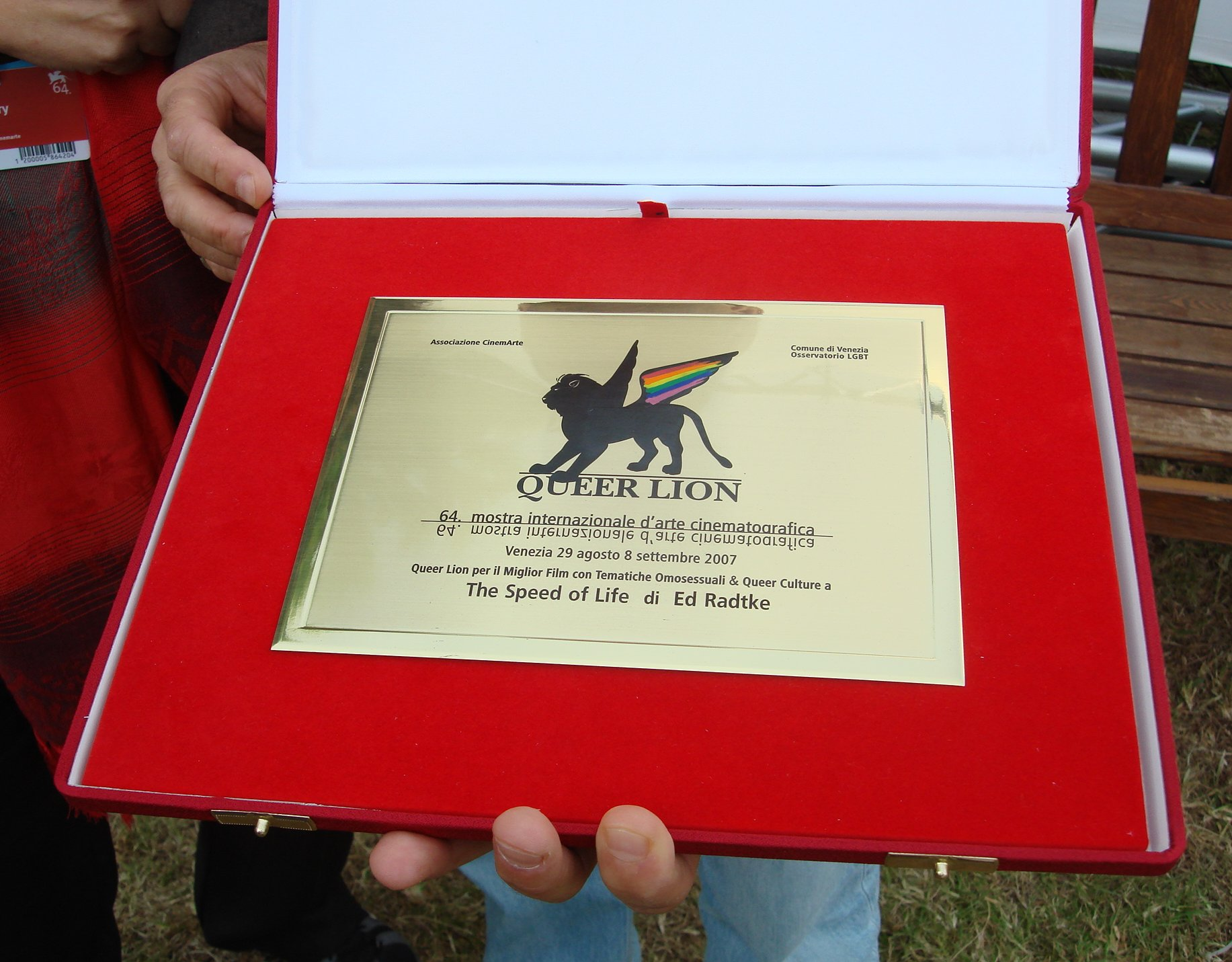
The first Queer Lion, awarded to The Speed of Life in 2007

== History ==
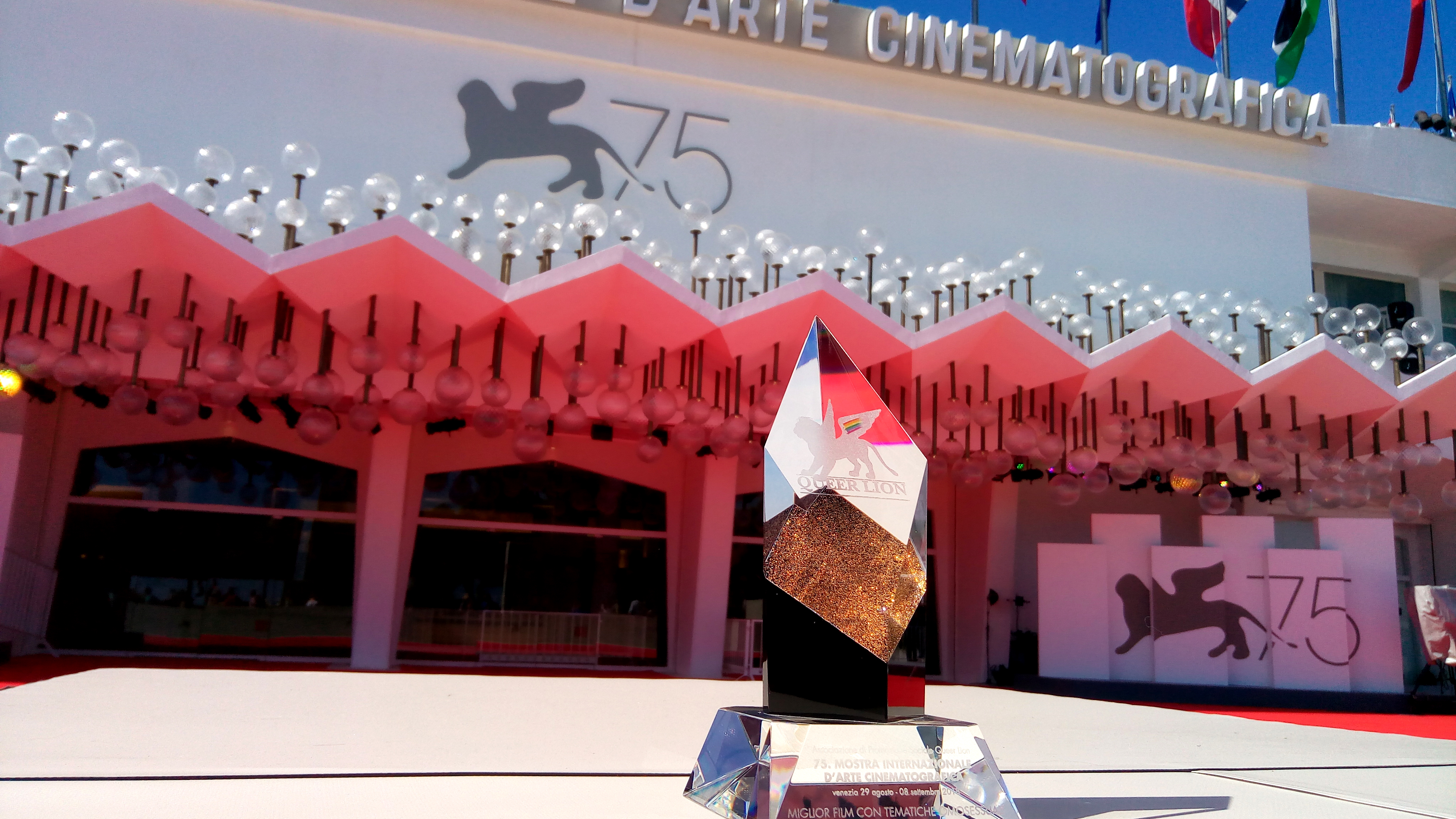
The Queer Lion award at the 75th Venice Film Festival

The idea of the Queer Lion comes from a 2003 interview, made by president of CinemArte association Daniel N. Casagrande for monthly magazine Venezia News, to then-Director of the Venice Film Festival Moritz de Hadeln. During the interview, Casagrande asked de Hadeln if the Venice Film Festival would have welcomed an award meant to specifically honor gay-themed movies, the same way Berlin International Film Festival had done 20 years earlier (with Teddy Award). Although the answer was a positive one, the changing of the Festival’s director the following year caused a delay in the development of the project, which was greenlighted by the new director Marco Müller, who declared his will to back and sustain the creation of such a new collateral award.

The prize first winner was American filmmaker Edward Radtke for the drama film The Speed of Life (2007) at the 64th edition.

Among its winners are: Tom Ford, Al Pacino, Stephen Frears, Tom Hooper, and Mona Fastvold.

== Winners ==
=== 2000s ===
Year	English Title	Original Title	Director(s)	Production Country	Ref
2007	The Speed of Life		Edward Radtke	United States	
2008	One Day in a Life	Un Altro Pianeta	Stefano Tummolini	Italy	
2009	A Single Man		Tom Ford	United States	

=== 2010s ===
Year	English Title	Original Title	Director(s)	Production Country	Ref
2010	In the Future	En el Futuro	Mauro Andrizzi	Argentina	
2011	Wilde Salomé		Al Pacino	United States	
2012	The Weight	무게	Jeon Kyu-hwan	South Korea	
2013	Philomena		Stephen Frears	United Kingdom	
2014	Summer Nights	Les Nuits d'été	Mario Fanfani	France	
2015	The Danish Girl		Tom Hooper	United States	
2016	Heartstone	Hjartasteinn	Guðmundur Arnar Guðmundsson	Iceland	
2017	Reinventing Marvin	Marvin ou la belle éducation	Anne Fontaine	France	
2018	José		Cheng Li	Guatemala, United States	
2019	The Prince	El Principe	Sebastián Muñoz	Chile	

=== 2020s ===
Year	English Title	Original Title	Director(s)	Production Country	Ref
2020	The World to Come		Mona Fastvold	United States	
2021	The Last Chapter	La dernière séance	Gianluca Matarrese	Italy, France	
2022	Skin Deep	Aus meiner Haut	Alex Schaad	Germany	
2023	Housekeeping for Beginners	Домаќинство за почетници	Goran Stolevski	Poland, Serbia, Australia, Croatia, Kosovo, North Macedonia, United States	
2024	Soul of the Desert	Alma del Desierto	Mónica Taboada-Tapia	Colombia, Brazil	
2025	On the Road	En el Camino	David Pablos	Mexico, France	
2026	London		Victor Di Marco and Márcio Picoli	Brazil	
2026	Queer Edward II		Theo Rollason	United Kingdom	
