= The Girl Flew =

2021 Italian film

- Directed by: Wilma Labate
- Screenplay by: Wilma Labate; D'Innocenzo brothers
- Produced by: Gabriele Trama; Roberto Manni
- Starring: Alma Noce
- Cinematography: Sandro Chessa
- Edited by: Mario Marrone
- Music by: Ratchev & Carratello
- Release date: 2021
- Language: Italian

The Girl Flew (Italian: La ragazza ha volato) is a 2021 Italian-Slovenian drama film directed by Wilma Labate. Labate wrote the screenplay with Damiano and Fabio D'Innocenzo.

The film premiered in the Horizons Extra sidebar at the 78th edition of the Venice Film Festival and was released in Italian cinemas on 23 June 2022.

== Plot ==
Nadia is a friendless and apathetic woman who lives a monotonous life. One day, she accompanies Brando to his house, thinking that she'll finally have a new friend. However, Brando has an ulterior motive, which changes the trajectory of Nadia's life.

== Cast ==
- Alma Noce as Nadia
- Luka Zunic as Brando
- Livia Rossi as Nadia's sister
- Rossana Mortara as Nadia's mother
- Massimo Somaglino as Nadia's father
