= Django & Django =

2021 documentary film

- Directed by: Luca Rea
- Screenplay by: Steve Della Casa; Luca Rea
- Produced by: Tilde Corsi; Nicoletta Ercole; Nicola Marzano; Mario Niccolo Messina
- Cinematography: Andrea Arnone
- Edited by: Stuart Mabey
- Music by: Andrea Guerra
- Production company: Nicomax Cinematografica
- Release dates: September 7, 2021 (Venice); November 15, 2021 (Italy)
- Running time: 79 minutes
- Country: Italy
- Language: Italian

Django & Django is a 2021 Italian documentary film co-written and directed by Luca Rea.

The film premiered out of competition at the 78th edition of the Venice Film Festival.

== Cast ==
- Sergio Corbucci (archive footage)
- Quentin Tarantino
- Franco Nero
- Ruggero Deodato

== Development ==
The film is an homage to the career of director Sergio Corbucci, with a particular attention towards his Spaghetti Western production, and it extensively features Corbucci's fan Quentin Tarantino, as well as Django lead Franco Nero and longtime collaborator Ruggero Deodato.

== Release ==
Django & Django had its world premiere out of competition at the 78th edition of the Venice Film Festival on September 7, 2021. The film had a limited theatrical release on November 15, 2021 in Italy.

=== Critical reception ===
On the review aggregator website Rotten Tomatoes, 75% of 8 critics' reviews are positive, with an average rating of 7.30/10.
