= Vera Dreams of the Sea =

2021 drama film

- Directed by: Kaltrina Krasniqi
- Screenplay by: Doruntina Basha
- Produced by: Shkumbin Istrefi
- Starring: Teuta Ajdini
- Cinematography: Sevdije Kastrati
- Edited by: Kaltrina Krasniqi; Vladimir Pavlovski
- Production companies: ISSTRA Creative Factory; Dream Factory Macedonia; Papadhimitri Film Production
- Release date: September 8, 2021 (Venice)
- Running time: 82 minutes
- Countries: Kosovo; Albania; North Macedonia
- Language: Albanian

Vera Dreams of the Sea (Albanian: Vera Andrron Detin) is a 2021 drama film directed by Kaltrina Krasniqi, in her feature film debut and stars Teuta Ajdini Jegeni as Vera, a woman dealing with the aftermath of her husband's death.

A co-production between Kosovo, Albania and North Macedonia, the film premiered at the 78th edition of the Venice Film Festival, in the Horizons competition. It was awarded best film at the 34th Tokyo International Film Festival and won the Ingmar Bergman Award at the Gothenburg Film Festival.

== Plot ==
Television sign-language interpreter Vera lives with her husband, Fatmir, in Kosovo. On his 65th birthday, Fatmir commits suicide and is discovered by Vera. After his death, Fatmir's cousin claims that he promised him a house as an inheritance.

== Cast ==
- Teuta Ajdini as Vera
- Alketa Sylaj as Sara
- Refet Abazi as Basriu
- Astrit Kabashi as Ahmeti
- Ilire Vinca Celaj as Fatimja

== Production ==
In 2014, screenwriter Doruntina Basha met with her childhood friend, director Kaltrina Krasniqi for the first time in fifteen years and brought with her a draft script of Vera Dreams of the Sea. Krasniqi was shocked at the similarities between the character of Vera and her own mother's life experiences, and became interested in the film. She also later stated that the project's focus on an older woman, a demographic she believes is under-represented in film overall, was another reason for her interest in it. The film entered pre-production in 2016 with principal photography slated to start in early 2017. The film was a co-production involving Albanian Papadhimitri Film Production, North Macedonian Dream Factory, Kosovan Isstra Creative Factory, and Vera Films.

Casting for the character of Vera took over a year, with auditions taking place in Skopje, Pristina and Tirana. Director Krasniqi later stated that she had difficulty casting the role due to the lack of Albanian speaking actresses of the appropriate age, which she believed was due to women from that generation having "not been encouraged to study or practise the arts". Teuta Ajdini Jegeni auditioned for a role in Skopje and was at the time part of an Albanian theatre ensemble. Initially, Krasniqi was nervous about casting her due to her theatre background. However, she was convinced after Ajdini's six months of preparation for the role, which included learning sign language.

== Release ==
It premiered at the 78th Venice International Film Festival in 2021 as part of the Horizons selection. International distribution was handled by Heretic.

== Reception ==
On the review aggregator website Rotten Tomatoes, 100% of 5 critics' reviews are positive, with an average rating of 7.00/10.

The film won two awards at the 2021 Venice International Film Festival as well as receiving special recognition from the Thessaloniki Festival of Greek Cinema jury. On 8 November 2021, it was awarded the Tokyo Grand Prix best film prize at the 34th Tokyo International Film Festival. Kaltrina Krasniqi also won the Ingmar Bergman International Debut Award at the Gothenburg Film Festival for directing the film.
