= Andrijana Cvetkovik =

Macedonian film director, writer, and diplomat (born 1981)

- Андријана Цветковиќ
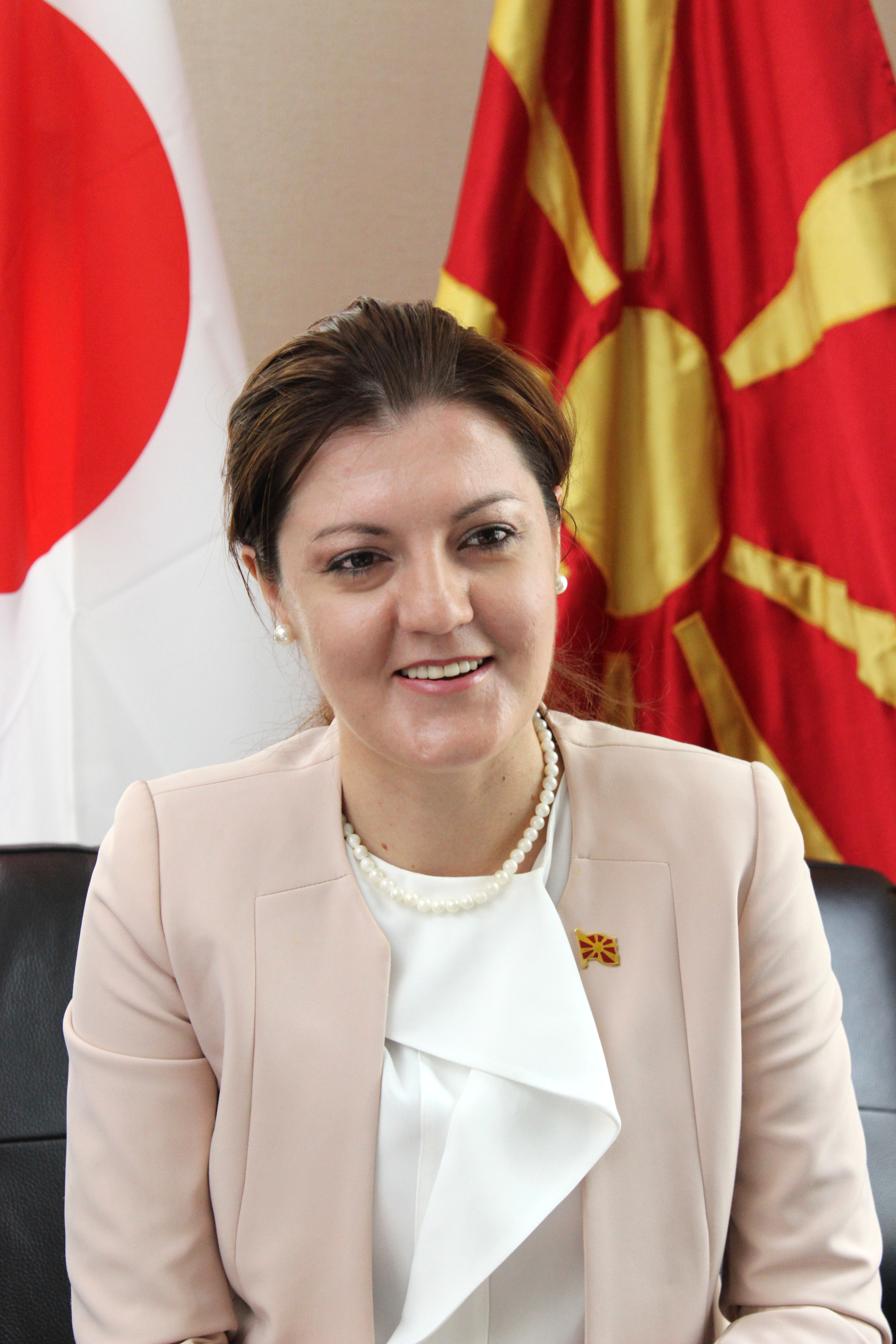
- Cvetkovik in 2015

Ambassador of North Macedonia to Japan
- In office 2014–2018
- President: Gjorge Ivanov
- Succeeded by: Goran Cekov

Personal details
- Born: 5 April 1981 (age 45) Skopje, Socialist Republic of Macedonia
- Education: National Academy for Theatre and Film Arts (MA); Nihon University (PhD)

Andrijana Cvetkovik (Macedonian: Андријана Цветковиќ, born 5 April 1981) is a Macedonian film director, writer and diplomat. She was the first resident Ambassador of North Macedonia to Japan from 2014 to 2018 and is a programmer at the annual Tokyo International Film Festival (TIFF).

== Early life and education ==
Cvetkovik was born in 1981 in Skopje, then in the Socialist Republic of Macedonia, a federated state of Yugoslavia.

She studied for a master's degree in Cinema & Media at the National Academy for Theatre and Film Arts (NATFIZ) in Sofia, Bulgaria, then a Ph.D. in Cinema Studies at Nihon University in Japan.

== Career ==
Cvetkovik produced the documentary film TANGENTS about "the intersections between Japanese and Bulgarian culture." Her films Purple and Gold and Nami no Jikan both received awards at local Japanese film festivals. She has also been honoured with an excellence award from the Japanese Association of Audiovisual Producers.

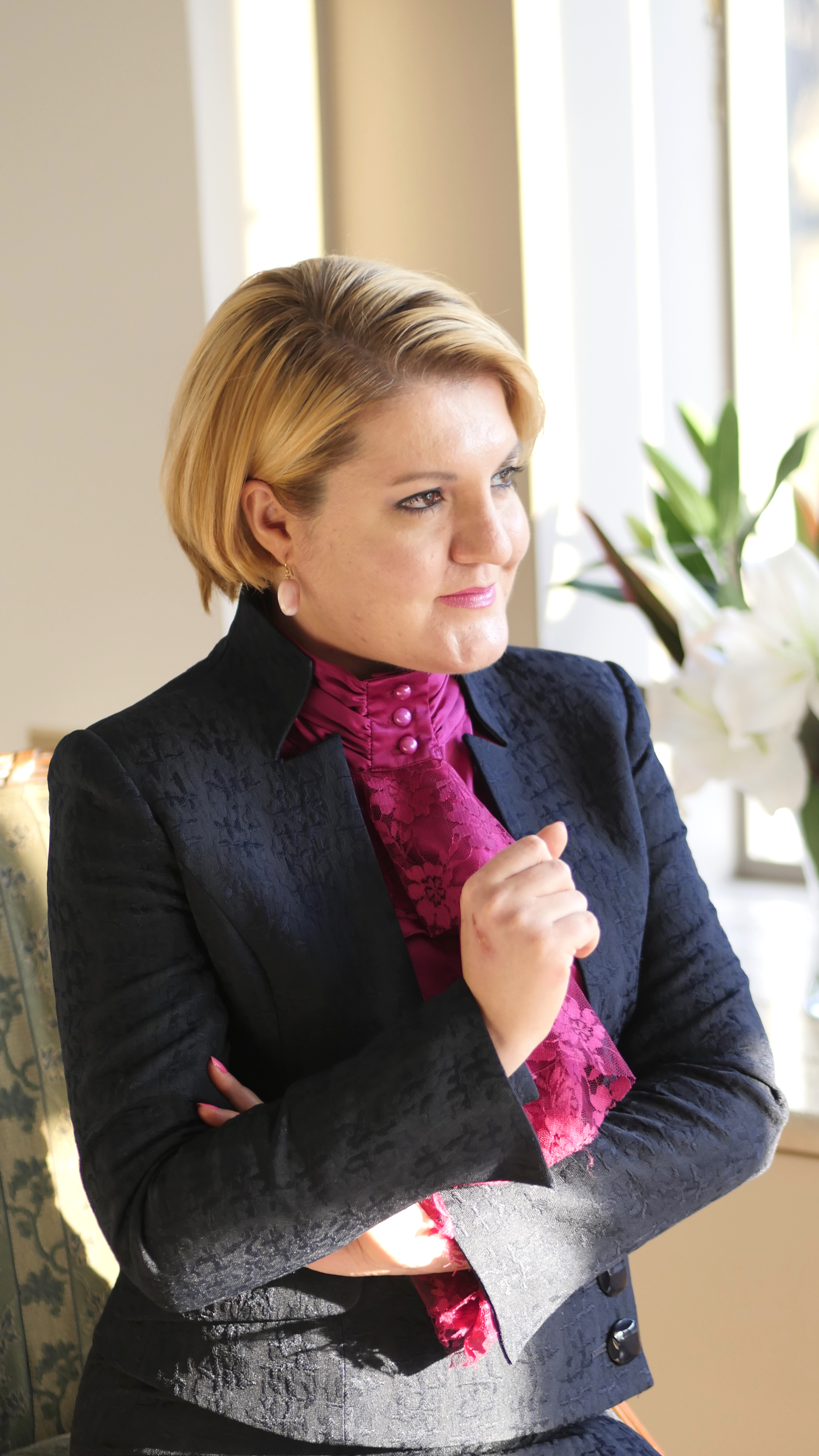
Cvetkovik in 2017

North Macedonia opened its first resident embassy in Tokyo in 2013. As a diplomat, Cvetkovik served as the first resident Ambassador of North Macedonia to Japan from 2014 to 2018. In 2016, she won the 19th Japan Through Diplomats' Eyes contest for her photograph of the Hijiribashi Bridge over the Kanda River in Tokyo. In 2017, she opened the first public event at the Macedonian Embassy, a photo exhibition about Mother Teresa.

In 2019, Cvetkovik was awarded the Honorary title of Doctor Honoris Causa for her contributions to Science, Culture and Education by the European University (now the EU Business School).

In 2021, Cvetkovik was a jury member of the Amazon Prime Video Take One Award at the 34th Tokyo International Film Festival. In 2024, she was appointed as the senior programmer for the inaugural Women’s Empowerment section, co-hosted by the Tokyo Metropolitan Government, at the 37th Tokyo International Film Festival. She was the first non-Japanese programmer at the festival and is also the executive producer of TIFFCOM, the festival’s affiliated content market.

Cvetkovik is a charter member of the Equilar Diversity Network. She also serves as Advisor to Japan's Agency for Cultural Affairs (Bunkacho).
