= Wilma Labate =

Italian film director and screenwriter (born 1949)

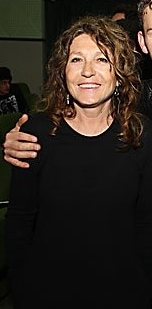
- Born: 4 December 1949 (age 76); Rome
- Occupations: film director and screenwriter

Wilma Labate (born 4 December 1949) is an Italian film director and screenwriter.

Born in Rome, Labate started her career as a television director, then in the 1980s she worked in the field of documentary filmmaking.

She made her feature film debut in 1992 with Ambrogio, for which she was nominated best new director at the 1994 Nastri d'Argento. In 1996, her film La mia generazione won the Grolla d'oro for best film and was the Italian candidate in the race for the 1997 Academy Awards for Best Foreign Film. In 2007, her fil Miss F, premiered at the Turin Film Festival. After a series of documentaries, in 2021 Labate returned to narrative films with The Girl Flew, which premiered at the 78th Venice International Film Festival.

Labate is also an author and in 2005 co-wrote with Fausto Bertinotti the autobiographical book Il ragazzo con la maglietta a strisce.
