= Anatomy of Time =

2021 film

- Directed by: Jakrawal Nilthamrong
- Screenplay by: Jakrawal Nilthamrong
- Starring: Teuta Ajdini
- Cinematography: Phuttiphong Aroonpheng
- Edited by: Lee Chatametikool; Katharina Warten
- Release date: September 10, 2021 (Venice)
- Language: Thai

Anatomy of Time (Thai: เวลา, Wela) is a 2021 drama film written and directed by Jakrawal Nilthamrong.

A co-production between Thailand, France, Netherlands and Singapore, the film premiered at the 78th edition of the Venice Film Festival, in the Horizons competition. It was awarded the Grand Prize at 2021 Tokyo Filmex.

== Cast ==
- Thaveeratana Leelanuja as Old Meam
- Prapamonton Eiamchan as Young Meam
- Sorabodee Changsiri as Old Officer
- Wanlop Rungkumjad as Young Officer

== Production ==
Producer Mai Meksawan was awarded the inaugural Southeast Asia Co-Production Grant, given by the Singapore Film Commission, which is up to S$250,000 (US$183,000$) to produce the film.
