= Sell Out! =

- Directed by: Yeo Joon Han
- Produced by: Yeo Joon Han
- Starring: Peter Davis, Jerrica Lai, Kee Thuan-chye, Lim Teik-long
- Edited by: Yeo Joon Han
- Distributed by: Amok Films
- Release date: 29 August 2008 (Venice)
- Running time: 110 minutes
- Country: Malaysia
- Languages: English, Cantonese. Malay

Sell Out! is a 2008 comedy film set in Malaysia which premiered at the 65th Venice International Film Festival where it also won the Young Cinema Award for Alternative Vision. It was written, edited and directed by Yeo Joon Han who is a graduate of the London Film Academy.

Described as Malaysia’s first 'Manglish' (Malaysian-English) musical comedy, it points fingers at various institutions and people in the country, from bureaucrats and CEOs to artists and the media.

== Plot ==
Self-absorbed Malaysian TV host, Rafflesia Pong (Jerrica Lai), whose art-discussion programme is dying from lousy ratings, stumbles upon a golden opportunity when her latest interviewee, an ex-boyfriend, dies in front of the camera. It is perfect timing as she has to find a way to come up with the ultimate reality show to outdo her American-accented pan-Asian rival. Eric Tan (Peter Davis) is a mild-mannered, half-English corporate slave who, like Pong, works for the Fony Corporation. He labours to create the perfect Soyamaker Machine but is constantly assailed by unreasonable insults from his megalomaniacal CEO bosses and is in love with Pong.

== Awards and accolades ==
- WINNER Young Cinema Award for Alternative Vision - Venice Film Festival 2008
- WINNER NETPAC Award - Taipei Golden Horse Film Festival 2008
- Best Film of the Venice Critics Week 2008 - Italian Critics Poll, Cineforum
- Awarded- Special Mention at the Barcelona Asian Film Festival!

== List of Film Festivals and Premieres ==
1. Venice Film Festival, Critic's Week (World Premiere)

2. Vancouver International Film Festival (North American Premiere)

3. Pusan International Film Festival (Asian Premiere)

4. Taipei Golden Horse Festival

5. Zurich Film Festival

6. Hong Kong Asian Film Festival

7. World Film Festival of Bangkok

8. Karlovy-Vary International Film Festival *(2009)

9. Buenos Aires International Independent Film Festival (BAFICI) *(2009)

10. TromsØ International Film Festival, Norway *(2009)

11. Era New Horizons International Film Festival, Poland *(2009)

12 Barcelona Asian Film Festival *(2009)

13. Singapore International Film Festival (2009)

14. Festival Paris Cinema (2009)

15. Rome Asian Film Festival (2009)

== Cast ==
- Jerrica Lai
- Peter Davis
- Kee Thuan Chye
- Lim Teik Leong
