= Le quattro volte =

- Directed by: Michelangelo Frammartino
- Written by: Michelangelo Frammartino
- Produced by: Philippe Bober; Marta Donzelli; Elda Guidinetti; Gabriella Manfré; Susanne Marian; Gregorio Paonessa; Andres Pfäffli
- Starring: Giuseppe Fuda; Bruno Timpano; Nazareno Timpano; Artemio Vellone
- Cinematography: Andrea Locatelli
- Edited by: Benni Atria; Maurizio Grillo
- Music by: Paolo Benvenuti
- Production companies: Invisibile Film; Ventura Film; Vivo Film; Coproduction Office; Caravan Pass; Altamarea Film; Ministero per i Beni e le Attività Culturali; Eurimages Council of Europe; Calabria Film Commission; Torino Film Lab; Medienboard Berlin-Brandenburg; Regione Calabria; ZDF Enterprises; ARTE; RSI-Radiotelevisione Svizzera
- Distributed by: Cinecittà Luce
- Release dates: 16 May 2010 (Cannes); 28 May 2010 (Italy)
- Running time: 88 minutes
- Countries: Italy; Germany; Switzerland
- Language: Italian
- Box office: $255,391

Le quattro volte (English: "The Four Times") is an Italian film made in 2010. It depicts the concept of metempsychosis taking place in the remote mountain town of Caulonia, in southern Italy.

Le quattro volte was selected to be screened in the Directors' Fortnight section at the 2010 Cannes Film Festival on 16 May 2010, where the lead animal actor, Vuk, won the Special Jury Prize at the Palm Dog Awards.

== Plot ==
The film comprises four phases, or "turns", following Pythagoras. The turning of the phases occurs in Calabria where Pythagoras had his sect in Crotone. Pythagoras claimed he had lived four lives and this with his notion of metempsychosis is the structure of the film showing one phase and then turning into another phase. A famous anecdote is that Pythagoras heard the cry of his dead friend in the bark of a dog.

- The first turn is the human realm and is about an old goatherd who is quite sick and who takes medicine made from the dust from the church floor in water at night. This phase includes a long 8-minute take of the procession of the villagers culminating in the dog and truck episode so the goats occupy the village.
- The second turn is the animal realm and is a study of a young goat, from its birth until it becomes lost and dies at the foot of a tall fir tree.
- The third turn is the plant realm and is a study of the same fir tree. As part of the annual Pitë Festival (La Festa della Pitë), the tree is chopped down and displayed in the town square in an evocation of a cultural memory.
- The fourth turn shows the mineral realm as the tree is made into charcoal for the townspeople's fires. This phase, as charcoal is not a mineral in any modern definitions, points to a remembering of bio-cultural processes.

The fire and smoke point to carbon at the heart of the homes in the village delivered by the truck evoking human reason as the final understanding of the interaction of these turns and the true place of the human in the scheme of things. The smoke becomes dust, falling out from the chimneys at the end of the movie and down into the houses, street and back into the church. This is where the goatherd is seen trading milk for blessed dust for his nightly drinks, right at the beginning of the movie.

== Production ==
There is virtually no dialogue in the film. The film was written and directed by Michelangelo Frammartino and stars Giuseppe Fuda, Bruno Timpano, Nazareno Timpano and Artemio Vellone.

== Reception ==
=== Critical response ===
On Rotten Tomatoes the film has an approval rating of 93% based on 54 reviews, with an average rating of 8.1/10. The site's the consensus states "Birth, death, and transformation are examined in Le quattro volte, a profound and often funny meditation on the cycles of life on earth." On Metacritic, the film has a weighted average score of 80 out of 100, based on 16 reviews, indicating "generally favorable reviews".

Jonathan Romney, writing in The Independent on Sunday, described Le quattro volte as "both magnificent and magnificently economical," remarking "I like to think that it's possible for cinema to make profound cosmological statements without having to go all Cecil B. DeMille." Romney finds the film "the freshest and the deepest film I've encountered in a while," and "one of those rare films that anyone could enjoy, whether or not they normally care for slow Italian art cinema."

=== Accolades ===
Awards Group	Category	Recipient	Result
AFM International Independent Film Festival	!f Inspired Award		Won

== See also ==
- Slow cinema
