= The Best Years (film) =

2020 Italian film directed by Gabriele Muccino

- Film poster
- Italian: Gli anni più belli
- Directed by: Gabriele Muccino
- Written by: Gabriele Muccino; Paolo Costella
- Produced by: Marco Belardi; Paolo Del Brocco; Raffaella Leone
- Starring: Pierfrancesco Favino; Micaela Ramazzotti; Kim Rossi Stuart; Claudio Santamaria
- Cinematography: Eloi Molí
- Edited by: Claudio di Mauro
- Music by: Nicola Piovani
- Production companies: Lotus Production; Rai Cinema; 3 Marys Entertainment
- Distributed by: 01 Distribution
- Release date: 13 February 2020
- Running time: 129 minutes
- Country: Italy
- Language: Italian
- Budget: €8 million ($9.5 million)
- Box office: $7 million

The Best Years (Italian: Gli anni più belli, lit. 'The nicest years') is a 2020 biographical drama film directed by Gabriele Muccino.

The film, which was initially to be titled I migliori anni, began to be filmed on 3 June 2019 between Cinecittà, Rome, Naples, and Ronciglione and continued for the next nine weeks.

The soundtrack includes the song "Gli anni più belli" by Claudio Baglioni. It peaked on FIMI charts in 2020.

== Plot ==
Giulio, Gemma, Paolo and Riccardo have been friends since adolescence. In 40 years their aspirations, successes and failures are told, and the film also telling the changes to Italy and the Italians.

== Cast ==
- Pierfrancesco Favino as Giulio Ristuccia
- Micaela Ramazzotti as Gemma
- Kim Rossi Stuart as Paolo Incoronato
- Claudio Santamaria as Riccardo Morozzi
- Emma Marrone as Anna
- Nicoletta Romanoff as Margherita Angelucci
- Francesco Acquaroli as Sergio Angelucci
- Francesco Centorame as Giulio Ristuccia adolescent
- Andrea Pittorino as Paolo Incoronato adolescent
- Matteo De Buono as Riccardo Morozzi adolescent
- Alma Noce as Gemma adolescent
- Fabrizio Nardi as Padre di Giulio
- Mariano Rigillo as lawyer
- Paola Sotgiu as Paolo's mother
- Elisa Visari as Sveva Ristuccia
- Federica Flavoni as Luisa, Riccardo's mother

== Release ==
The Best Years premiered on 13 February 2020, and went back to the cinemas on 15 July in Italy.

== Reception ==
=== Box office ===
As of 2 September 2020, the film grossed $7 million worldwide, against a production budget of $9.5 million.

== See also ==
- C'eravamo tanto amati
