= Immaculate (2021 film) =

2021 film

- Directed by: Monica Stan; George Chiper-Lillemark
- Written by: Monica Stan; George Chiper-Lillemark
- Produced by: Marcian Lazar
- Cinematography: George Chiper-Lillemark
- Edited by: Delia Oniga
- Release dates: September 11, 2021 (Venice); May 27, 2022 (Romania)
- Running time: 114 minutes
- Country: Romania
- Language: Romanian

Immaculate (Romanian: Imaculat) is a 2021 Romanian drama film written and directed by Monica Stan and George Chiper-Lillemark.

The film premiered at the 78th edition of the Venice Film Festival, in the Giornate degli Autori sidebar, winning the section Director's Award and the Lion of the Future.

It was selected as the Romanian entry for the Best International Feature Film at the 95th Academy Awards.

== Cast ==
- Vasile Pavel as Spartac
- Cezar Grumazescu as Costea
- Ilona Brezoianu as Chanel
- Rares Andrici as Manu
- Bogdan Farcas as Radu Nebunu
- Hritcu Florin as Pisica
- Ioan Tiberiu Dobrica as Dorel
