= Gen (2025 film) =

Documentary film

- Directed by: Gianluca Matarrese
- Written by: Gianluca Matarrese, Donatella Della Ratta
- Produced by: Dominique Barneaud, Donatella Palermo, Alexandre Iordachescu
- Cinematography: Beniamino Barrese, Mattia Colombo, Jacopo Loiodice, Gianluca Matarrese
- Edited by: Giorgia Villa
- Music by: Cantautoma
- Production companies: Bellota Films, Stemal Entertainment, Elefant Films
- Distributed by: Barz and Hippo (Italy)
- Release date: January 24, 2025 (2025 Sundance Film Festival)
- Running time: 104 mins
- Countries: France, Switzerland, Italy
- Languages: Italian, English

Gen_ is a 2025 documentary film directed by Gianluca Matarrese about transgender healthcare, including medical transition and the discrimination faced by transgender communities. The film follows several months in the life of Dr. Bini, a fertility and hormone specialist "whose job comes with navigating both his patient's personal lives, and the conservative legalese by which they're bound."

The title of the film refers to the prefix related to terms that the film's lead character deals with in his work: genes, genitals, gender, genetics.

== Synopsis ==
At Niguarda Hospital in Milan, Dr. Bini oversees patients pursuing in vitro fertilization as well as people seeking medical support related to gender transition. The film follows his work within a public healthcare setting shaped by political restrictions, social tensions, and the growing commercialization of reproductive and gender-affirming care.

== Release ==
Gen_ had its world premiere at the 2025 Sundance Film Festival in the World Documentary Competition.

=== Awards ===
Date	Award	Category	Recipient(s)	Result	Ref.
2025	Sundance Film Festival	World Documentary Competition	Gen_	Nominated	
2025	Visions du Reel	Grand Angle	Gen_	Nominated	
2025	Sofia International Film Festival	International Documentary Competition	Gen_	Nominated	
2025	Thessaloniki Documentary Festival	International Competition	Gen_	Nominated	
2025	Karlovy Vary International Film Festival	Horizons	Gen_	Nominated	
