= Gianluca Matarrese =

Italian film director (born 1980)

Gianluca Matarrese (born 24 July 1980) is an Italian film director, screenwriter and actor.

== Life and career ==
The film The Last Chapter was presented at the Venice International Film Critics' Week winning the Queer Lion Award 2021. The film was aired on Cielo with the title L'ultima volta.

The film Fashion Babylon, starring three personalities from the fashion world, Casey Spooner, Violet Chachki and Michelle Elie, produced by Bellota Films with the participation of France Télévisions, had its world premiere at CPH:DOX in March 2022, and then continued on tour at numerous international festivals including Hot Docs, Lovers Film Festival - Torino LGBTQI, MiX Milano, Sydney Film Festival, Frameline San Francisco, Oslo Pix, Festival dei Popoli , Doc Point Helsinki, Doc Point Tallinn.

== Filmography ==
- Les Webcolocs - TV series (2009-2012)
- Mon Baiser de Cinéma - short film (2014)
- Décision - short film (2015)
- All Out - Documentary (2019)
- La dernière séance - documentary (2021)
- Barbara Pravi, voilà qui je suis - documentary (2021)
- Fashion Babylon - documentary (2022)
- The Place - Documentary (2022)
- Pinned Into a Dress - documentary short film (2022)
- Les beaux parleurs - documentary (2023)
- L'Expérience Zola - fiction (2023)
- Gen_ (2025)
