= Kaltrina Krasniqi =

Kosovan film director (born 1981)

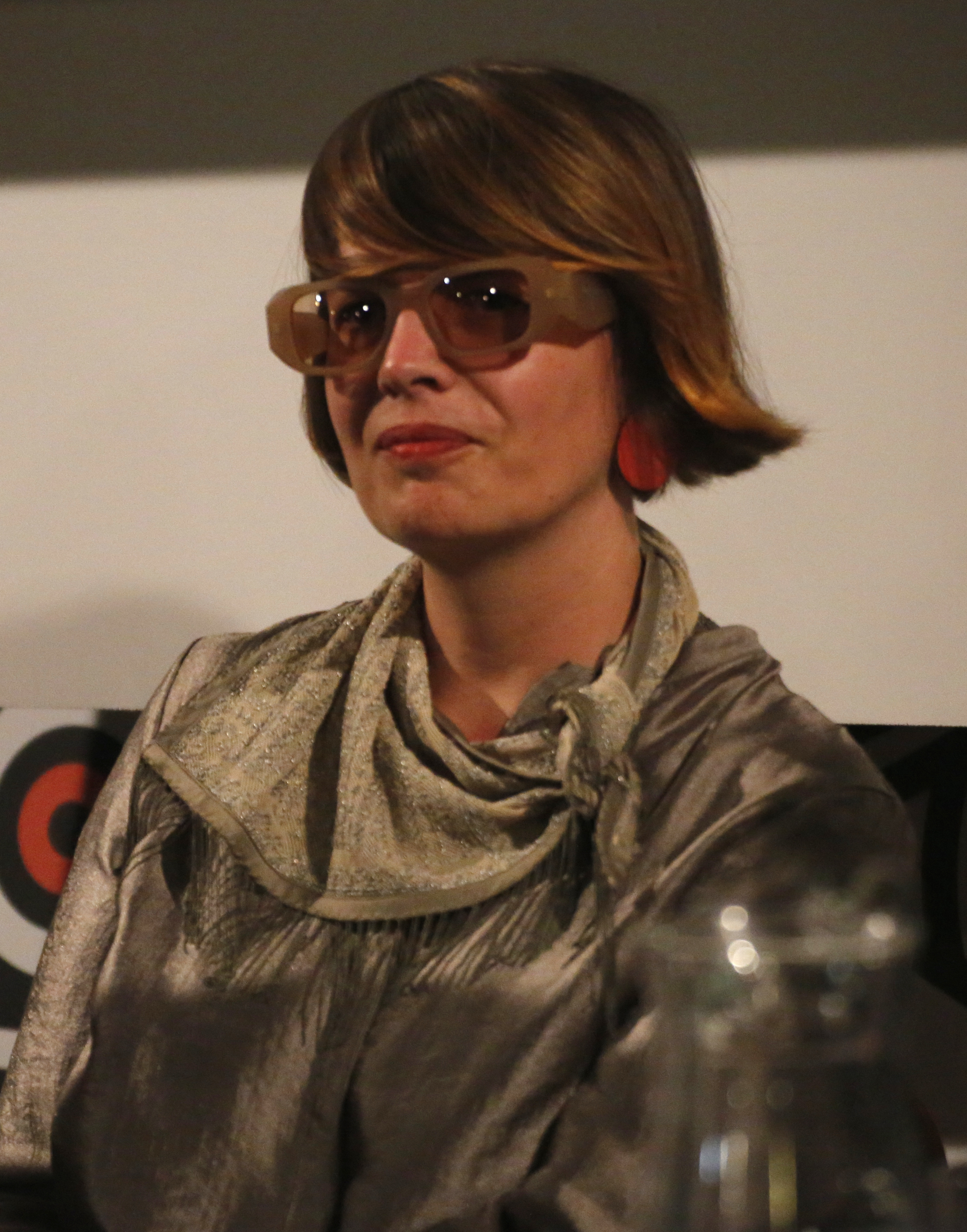
- Kaltrina Krasniqi in 2022
- Born: 1981 (age 44–45); Pristina, Yugoslavia
- Occupation: Film director
- Notable work: Vera Dreams of the Sea
- Spouse: Genc Salihu
- Children: 1

Kaltrina Krasniqi (born 1981) is a Kosovan film director best known for her 2021 film Vera Dreams of the Sea, which debuted at the 78th Venice International Film Festival. Krasniqi won the Ingmar Bergman International Debut Award for her work on the film.

== Early life ==
Kaltrina Krasniqi was born in 1981 in Pristina and was one of two sisters. Her mother mainly raised her after her parents divorced when she was six. Krasniqi studied film directing at the University of Pristina, becoming one of the first women to graduate from that program. She also studied at the University of California, Los Angeles and in Copenhagen.

== Career ==
In 2010, she was hired as a fixer on Birgitte Stærmose's Out of Love while it was being filmed in Kosovo.

Krasniqi was hired by the magazine Kosovo 2.0 in 2013 to direct the documentary Seks (Sex) chronicling sexuality and sexual issues in modern day majority Muslim conservative Kosovo. The documentary and magazine caused extreme controversy in the country, which resulted in physical attacks on the magazine's employees. The following year, Krasniqi directed her first film, a fictional short called Kanarinët e dinë (The Canaries Know) about a Kosovan family living through a war.

The same year, she met her childhood friend Doruntina Basha for the first time in fifteen years. Basha presented her with a draft script titled Vera Dreams of the Sea. Krasniqi was shocked to find similarities between the script's protagonist and her mother's experiences. She later mentioned that another reason for her interest in the project was its focus on an older woman, a demographic she believes is under-represented in film overall. The film entered pre-production in 2016 with principal photography slated to start in early 2017. It was a co-production involving Albanian Papadhimitri Film Production, North Macedonian Dream Factory, Kosovan Isstra Creative Factory, and Vera Films, with international distribution handled by Heretic. Vera Dreams of the Sea premiered at the 78th Venice International Film Festival in 2021 in the Horizons sidebar and was Krasniqi's feature film debut. The film won two awards at the festival and received special recognition from the Thessaloniki Festival of Greek Cinema jury. Krasniqi won the Gothenburg Film Festival Ingmar Bergman International Debut Award for the film.

In 2026, she began shooting in Pristina on her second feature film Zbardje (Whitening) (Note: Also translated as Bleach), which was again written by Doruntina Basha. The film was supported with a grant of €60,000 from the International Film Festival's Hubert Bals Fund.

== Personal life ==
Krasniqi is married to musician and actor Genc Salihu. They have one daughter and have co-founded a bookshop together in Pristina.
