= Mother Lode (2021 film) =

2021 film directed by Matteo Tortone

- Directed by: Matteo Tortone
- Screenplay by: Mathieu Granier; Matteo Tortone
- Cinematography: Patrick Tresch
- Edited by: Enrico Giovannone; Morena Terranova
- Music by: Ivan Pisino
- Release date: 2021
- Language: Spanish

Mother Lode (French: La mine du diable) is a 2021 French-Italian-Swiss docufiction film co-written and directed by Matteo Tortone.

The film premiered at the 78th edition of the Venice Film Festival, in the Venice International Critics' Week sidebar.

== Cast ==
- José Luis Nazario Campos
- Damian Segundo Vospey
- Maximiliana Campos Guzman

== Reception ==
On the review aggregator website Rotten Tomatoes, 100% of 5 critics' reviews are positive, with an average rating of 8.00/10.
