= Michelangelo Frammartino =

Italian filmmaker

- Born: 1968 (age 57–58); Milan, Italy
- Occupations: Director, Screenwriter
- Years active: 1995–present

Michelangelo Frammartino (born 1968) is an Italian slow cinema filmmaker and professor. Most known for his critically acclaimed films Le quattro volte (2010) and Il buco (2021), for the latter he won the Special Jury Prize (3rd place) at the 78th Venice International Film Festival.

== Biography ==
Michelangelo Frammartino was born in Milan to Calabrian parents in 1968. In 1991 he enrolled in the Architecture Faculty of the Politecnico di Milano. Between 1994 and 1997 he attended Milan's film school, Civica Scuola del Cinema, for which he produced videoart installations and worked as a set designer for films and video clips. He also shot several short films: Tracce (1995), L'Occhio e lo Spirito (1997), BIBIM (1999), Scappa Valentina (2001), Io Non Posso Entrare (2002).

Since 2005 he has been teaching filmmaking at the University of Bergamo. In December 2013 he held a workshop at the University of Calabria.

His first feature Il Dono premiered at the 56th Locarno Film Festival in 2003. His following film Le quattro volte (2010) was selected at the Director's Fortnight in Cannes, where it won the Label Europa Cinema.

His 2021 film Il buco was selected for the main competition at the 78th Venice International Film Festival, where it received positive reviews and won the Special Jury Prize.

In the 2022 Sight and Sound critic's poll to determine the greatest films of all time, he voted for Journey to Italy, Paisan, Germany, Year Zero, Stromboli terra di Dio, Francesco Giullare di Dio, Europa '51, Fear, India, La Prise de Pouvoir Par Louis XIV, and Rome, Open City, all of which are directed by Roberto Rosselini.

== Filmography ==
=== Short films ===
- Tracce (1995)
- L'Occhio e lo Spirito (1997)
- BIBIM (1999) – co-directed with Cafi Mohamud
- Scappa Valentina (2001)
- Io Non Posso Entrare (2002)
- Alberi (2013)

=== Feature films ===
- Il Dono (2003)
- Le quattro volte (2010)
- Il buco (2021)

=== Installations ===
- Presenze s-connesse (1995)
- Ora (1995)
- La Casa delle Belle Addormentate (1997)
- Film (1998)
- Alberi (2013)
- Sguardi in Macchina (2013)

== Sources ==
- Lanfranchi, Alessandro (2016). "The Post-human Sound An Interview with Michelangelo Frammartino". Relations. Beyond Anthropocentrism. 4 (2).
