= The Last Chapter (2021 film) =

2021 film by Gianluca Matarrese

- French: La dernière séance
- Directed by: Gianluca Matarrese
- Written by: Gianluca Matarrese; Nico Morabito
- Produced by: Giovanni Donfrancesco
- Starring: Bernard Guyonnet
- Cinematography: Gianluca Matarrese
- Edited by: Gianluca Matarrese; Giovanni Donfrancesco; Giorgia Villa
- Music by: Cantautoma
- Production companies: Altara Films; Bocalupo Films
- Release date: September 11, 2021 (Venice)
- Running time: 100 minutes
- Countries: France; Italy
- Language: French

The Last Chapter (French: la dernière séance) is a French-Italian documentary film, directed by Gianluca Matarrese and released in 2021. The film is a portrait of Bernard Guyonnet, a gay man in Paris, France, who is entering retirement and pondering his legacy as a person still scarred by having lost two partners to HIV/AIDS in his younger days.

The film premiered at the 78th Venice International Film Festival, where it was named the winner of the Queer Lion.
