= Il buco =

2021 film

- Directed by: Michelangelo Frammartino
- Written by: Michelangelo Frammartino; Giovanna Giuliani
- Produced by: Marco Serrecchia; Michelangelo Frammartino; Philippe Bober
- Starring: Paolo Cossi; Jacopo Elia; Denise Trombin; Nicola Lanza
- Cinematography: Renato Berta
- Edited by: Benni Atria
- Production companies: Doppio Nodo Double Bind; Rai Cinema
- Distributed by: Coproduction Office (international sales)
- Release date: 3 September 2021 (Venice)
- Running time: 93 minutes
- Countries: Italy; France; Germany
- Language: Italian

Il buco (Italian lit. 'The Hole') is a 2021 Italian drama film directed by Michelangelo Frammartino. Its storyline centres on discovery and exploration of the almost 700 metre deep Bifurto Abyss ("Abisso del Bifurto" in Italian) in the caves of Pollino in southern Italy in August 1961.

The film was released on 3 September 2021. It was selected to compete for the Golden Lion at the 78th Venice International Film Festival, and won the Special Jury Prize. The film is Frammartino's third feature length release.

== Plot ==
In 1961, a group of speleologists from the north of Italy (the Piedmontese Speleological Group) start a descent into the Abisso di Bifurto, also known as the "Wolf Pit". The previous year, a group had reached a depth of 440 metres in a descent, however the cave, being 683 metres deep, has not been explored to its full depth, and thus the explorers have no maps to rely on during their descent. Local shepherds are able to advise them of the entrance to the cave. In parallel to their descent, we see footage of an old shepherd, in agony, and his journey from life to death. The arrival of the explorers at the bottom of the abyss and death of the shepherd happen in unison. The nearby town relies on a TV in the town square for its news, and two explorers from the original descent, Beppe de Matteis and Giulio Gecchele, see news of the new group reaching the bottom of the cave, and are moved by this. The film features almost no dialogue, and as with Frammartino's other films, belongs to the slow cinema genre.

== Accolades ==
Award	Category	Recipient(s)	Result	Ref.
European Film Award	Best Sound Designer	Simone Paolo Olivero, Paolo Benvenuti, Benni Atria, Marco Saitta, Ansgar Frerich, Florian Holzner	Won	
London Film Festival	Best Film	Michelangelo Frammartino	Nominated	
Mannheim-Heidelberg International Film Festival	Grand Newcomer Award	Michelangelo Frammartino	Won	
Seville European Film Festival	Golden Giraldillo	Michelangelo Frammartino	Nominated	
Venice Film Festival	Golden Lion	Michelangelo Frammartino	Nominated	
Venice Film Festival	Special Jury Prize	Il buco	Won	
