= Gábor Fabricius =

Hungarian writer and filmmaker

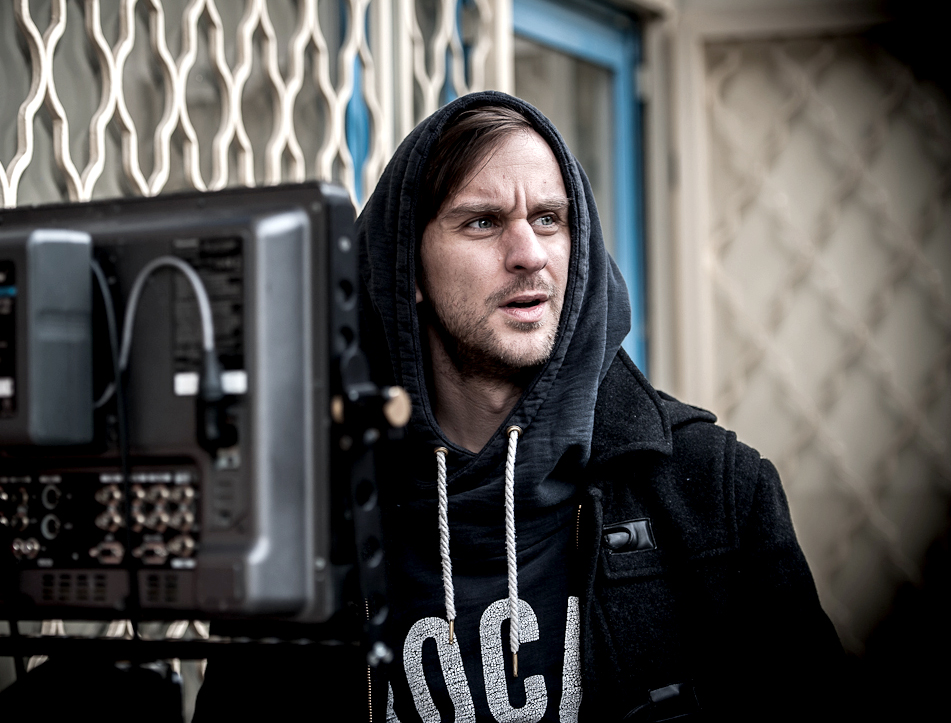
- Born: Budapest, Hungary
- Education: Moholy-Nagy University of Art and Design 2003
- Alma mater: Central Saint Martins, University of the Arts London 2005
- Occupations: film director, writer, screenwriter, media designer
- Awards: Multiculturalism Prize – British Council – 2008; Karlovy Vary International Film Festival, Best script in development – 2018; Most innovative Film – Venice Biennale, International Critics' Academy – 2021; Special Jury Award, Pune International Film Festival, India – 2022

Gábor Fabricius is a Hungarian film director and screenwriter, writer, and media designer.

== Early life and education ==
Gábor Fabricius was born in Budapest, Hungary. He graduated from the Eötvös József Gimnázium, Budapest, in 1994. Later he continued his studies and in 2003 was awarded his diploma in media design from Moholy-Nagy University of Art and Design in Budapest.

Fabricius graduated in 2005 with an MA from Central Saint Martins, University of the Arts London.

== Career ==
After graduating, Fabricius began his film career as an intern at Scott Free Films, Ridley Scott's production company.

In 1997 Fabricius founded the creative agency Republic Group. He was the media designer for the new company and directed several commercials himself. As a media designer and creative director, Fabricius and his company have won awards such as the Golden Media Lion at the Cannes Lions International Festival of Creativity in 2000, as well as the Sabre Award and a Silver Clio Award in 2017. In the early 2000s, Fabricius founded the non-profit foundation Ittvan.org, which focused on social awareness campaigns. In 2008, the British Council awarded him the Multiculturalism Prize for his work as an intercultural mediator. In 2010 Fabricius founded the creative film company Otherside Stories.

Since 2014 he has taught photography at his former alma mater the Moholy-Nagy University of Art and Design in Budapest. By 2018, Fabricius had founded BrandFestival, a communication forum in Hungary. He has published on political marketing in Magyar Hírlap and Figyelő.

== Films ==
Fabricius started making short films in 2006. That year he made his first short film Live, in connection with the Sziget Fesztivál. In the same year, he wrote and directed his short film Grown Ups (Felnőttek), which was screened at the Naoussa International Film Festival in Greece.

Fabricius' short film Bianka was released in 2012, reflecting the tensions of the Roma issue in Hungary at the time.

A short film about evictions, called Skinner (Sintér), which is set against the backdrop of the local underworld and the housing mafia followed in 2014. Skinner had its world premiere at the Toronto International Film Festival. The film also presented in 2015 at the Vilnius International Film Festival in Lithuania, the Cork International Film Festival in Ireland, the Vukovar Film Festival in Croatia and the Raindance Film Festival in London. The film later won Magyar Média Alap's Huszárik Zoltán Award in 2015.

Fabricius made his short film Dialogue (Dialógus) in 2016, which deals with the issue of migration. The film was screened in the Zurich International Film Festival in the "Neue Welt Sicht Ungarn" section. It was subsequently included in the CinEast Film Festival in Luxembourg and the Mumbai International Film Festival in India, as well as the FabioFest Film Festival in the Czech Republic. Dialogue made its US debut at the 2018 Sacramento Film Festival.

=== Erasing Frank ===
Fabricius' first feature film, Erasing Frank (Eltörölni Frankot), completed in 2021, is a socio-political drama. Set behind the Iron Curtain of 1983 Budapest, Eastern Europe, the film follows Frank, a songwriter and singer of a banned punk band, who, as a representative of his generation, speaks out against the totalitarian regime and subsequently has to flee from retaliation. The film was produced by Otherside Stories and supported by National Film Institute (NFI).

Erasing Frank was selected by the Venice International Film Critics to have its world premiere at the Venice Film Festival on September 5, 2021. At the film festival, Fabricius fetched the award for most innovative film by the International Critics' Academy of Venice Biennale. In their tributes at the Venice awards ceremony, the foreign critics stressed that in making their decision they had judged the movie to be a film with a special atmosphere, a significant and moving work. As Screendaily's review stated, „Announces the arrival of Fabricius as a notable new talent in Hungarian cinema. It's a supremely confident piece of filmmaking which won the Circolo del Cinema di Verona Award for innovation after its premiere in Venice's Critics Week."

The Academy also awarded the International Starlight Cinema Award to Benjamin Fuchs, the protagonist in Fabricius' award-winning film, for the most powerful and memorable performance, making him the first Hungarian actor to receive this honour.

While the film was screened in black and white at the Venice world debut as well as later in the art cinema networks, a color version of the film had been released in traditional cinemas. The Hungarian premiere date was October 7, 2021.

In 2022, Erasing Frank was awarded a Special Jury Award at the Pune International Film Festival in India. The film also won the Grand Jury Fiction Award, Winners Movies that Matters Festival 2022 in the Netherlands.

=== Screenplays ===
As a screenwriter Fabricius has also written the screenplays for the films Skinner, Dialogue, and Erasing Frank.

He completed the script for Erasing Frank in 2018, two years before the film started shooting, and participated in several international film festival's screenwriting competitions, including Sarajevo, Karlovy Vary, and Vienna, where he was awarded at the Let's CEE Film Festival.

== Books ==
In 2009, Fabricius published his first short stories in his book Puha Neon Fejlövés (Soft Neon Headshot), in which he looks at the causes of the loss of values of the Hungarian upper class.

His second book, Másik bolygó (Another Planet) debuted in 2016. It is about young Hungarians who hitchhike to the West after the fall of communism.
