= Casey Kauffman =

American journalist and filmmaker

Casey Kauffman is an American journalist and filmmaker. He is known for his work as a journalist for Al Jazeera English and for directing films with Alessandro Cassigoli — The Things We Keep (2017), Butterfly (2018), Californie (2018), and Vittoria (2024).

== Life and career ==
Kauffman graduated from Stanford University in 2000 with a political science degree. Larry Diamond was Kauffman's thesis advisor.

Kauffman was a video producer for the United Nations World Food Programme.

=== Work for Al-Jazeera ===
Kauffman started working for Al-Jazeera English in 2006.

As a reporter and cameraman, Kauffman has traveled to locations throughout the world. Kauffman interviewed Laurent Nkunda in the Democratic Republic of the Congo, lived with immigrants at a camp in Mali, reported in the Gaza Strip, lived on a boat in Bangladesh after Cyclone Sidr, and reported on Liberian migrants in Staten Island.

In October 2008, Kauffman's report about a rally in St. Clairsville, Ohio by supporters of Sarah Palin, the Republican Party's vice-presidential candidate in the 2008 United States presidential election, created a controversy. In the rally, Palin's supporters made racist comments about Barack Obama, Democratic Party's presidential candidate, including the fear that Barack Obama is an anti-white Muslim terrorist. The story garnered massive attention. It had gone viral on the web and had been the source of a few editorials.

Colbert I. King, a columnist at The Washington Post, criticized the report and wrote a piece titled “A Rage No One Should Be Stoking”. In the article he said that “it is no accident that the English-language operation of Al-Jazeera, the Arab-language news network, tried to capture and broadcast to the Middle East, Africa and elsewhere a glimpse of America’s more sinister side... Was this fodder served up by Al-Jazeera to feed anti-American sentiment overseas? To be sure. But the camera didn’t lie. Did Al-Jazeera, however, record the whole truth?”

Tony Burman, the managing director of Al Jazeera English, denied that Kauffman's report was anti-American and responded in a letter to the Washington Post that Al Jazeera's international news channels, both English and Arabic, have devoted “more air time to covering this campaign than perhaps any other network” and that the overarching story that America seemed poised to elect its first black president “reflects exceptionally well on Americans and its democracy”.

In 2010, Kauffman earned a Concentra Award for Breaking News.

=== Filmmaking ===
In 2017, Kauffman and Alessandro Cassigoli directed the 2017 film The Things We Keep.

With Cassigoli, Kauffman directed the 2018 documentary Butterfly. The documentary was screened at the International Documentary Film Festival Amsterdam and the Hot Docs Canadian International Documentary Festival. It won the Globo d'oro for best documentary film.

Kauffman and Cassigoli went on to direct the 2021 film Californie. The film premiered at the 78th Venice International Film Festival in the Giornate degli Autori sidebar.

Kauffman and Cassigoli directed the 2024 film Vittoria, that premiered at the 81st Venice International Film Festival.
