= Californie (film) =

2021 film

- Directed by: Alessandro Cassigoli; Casey Kauffman
- Written by: Alessandro Cassigoli; Casey Kauffman
- Produced by: Damiano Ticconi; Sabina Tornatore
- Starring: Khadija Jaafari
- Cinematography: Emanuele Pasquet
- Edited by: Alessandro Cassigoli
- Music by: Giorgio Giampà
- Release date: September 3, 2021 (Venice)
- Language: Italian

Californie is a 2021 Italian drama film written and directed by Alessandro Cassigoli and Casey Kauffman, at their feature film debut.

It premiered at the 78th edition of the Venice Film Festival in the Giornate degli Autori sidebar, where it won the Europa Cinemas Label Award as best European film.

The film follows the growth of Jamila, a young Moroccan girl living in Torre Annunziata, and was shot over a span of five years, following the protagonist between 9 and 14 years. It has been described as "a character study of a girl coming in terms with how the European dream is out of reach".

== Cast ==
- Khadija Jaafari as Jamila
- Ikram Jaafari as Angelica
