= 83rd Venice International Film Festival =

2026 film festival in Italy

- Official poster by Manuele Fior
- Opening film: Ink
- Closing film: God Laughs
- Location: Venice, Italy
- Founded: 1932
- Awards: Golden Lion: Woman Unknown
- Hosted by: Greta Scarano and; Nicolas Maupas
- Artistic director: Alberto Barbera
- Festival date: 2–12 September 2026
- Website: www.labiennale.org/en/cinema

Venice Film Festival chronology
- 84th 82nd

The 83rd annual Venice International Film Festival took place from 2 to 12 September 2026, at Venice Lido in Italy. American actress and filmmaker Maggie Gyllenhaal served as Jury President for the main competition. Italian actors Greta Scarano and Nicolas Maupas hosted the opening and closing ceremonies.

The Golden Lion was awarded to Woman Unknown by May el-Toukhy. American actress Ellen Burstyn and American actor and filmmaker George Clooney received the Golden Lion for Lifetime Achievement during the festival.

The festival's full line-up was announced on 23 July, but Yuval Abraham and Rachel Szor's NAZA was added to the main competition only on 24 August, following safety concerns. While the selection of DAU, directed by Russian dissident filmmaker Ilya Khrzhanovsky, was condemned by Ukrainian official authorities for supposedly ties with the Kremlin. The statement was rebuffed by the festival's organization, which included a strong response from its artistic director Alberto Barbera, who called an unacceptable manipulation of reality.

Shortly before the festival's opening week, the main competition jury's press conference was cancelled without further explanation in an unprecedented decision. According to Deadline, the move came after highly charged press conferences at the 76th Berlin International Film Festival, where jurors and talent were repeatedly inquired by journalists about global politics, especially the Gaza war. Ultimately, the press conference was rescheduled to 2 September, the first day of the festival. Meanwhile, Roger Waters, Annie Ernaux, Matteo Garrone, Jasmine Trinca, Saleh Bakri, Céline Sciamma, among many other industry talents, signed an open letter organized by the Venice4Palestine collective calling the festival to take concrete action in support of Palestine, in the wake of the selection of two Palestinian films (Citizen Osama and Conversation with the Sea) about the ongoing conflict.

The festival opened with the biographical-drama film Ink by Danny Boyle, and closed with the period-drama film God Laughs by Giovanni Veronesi.

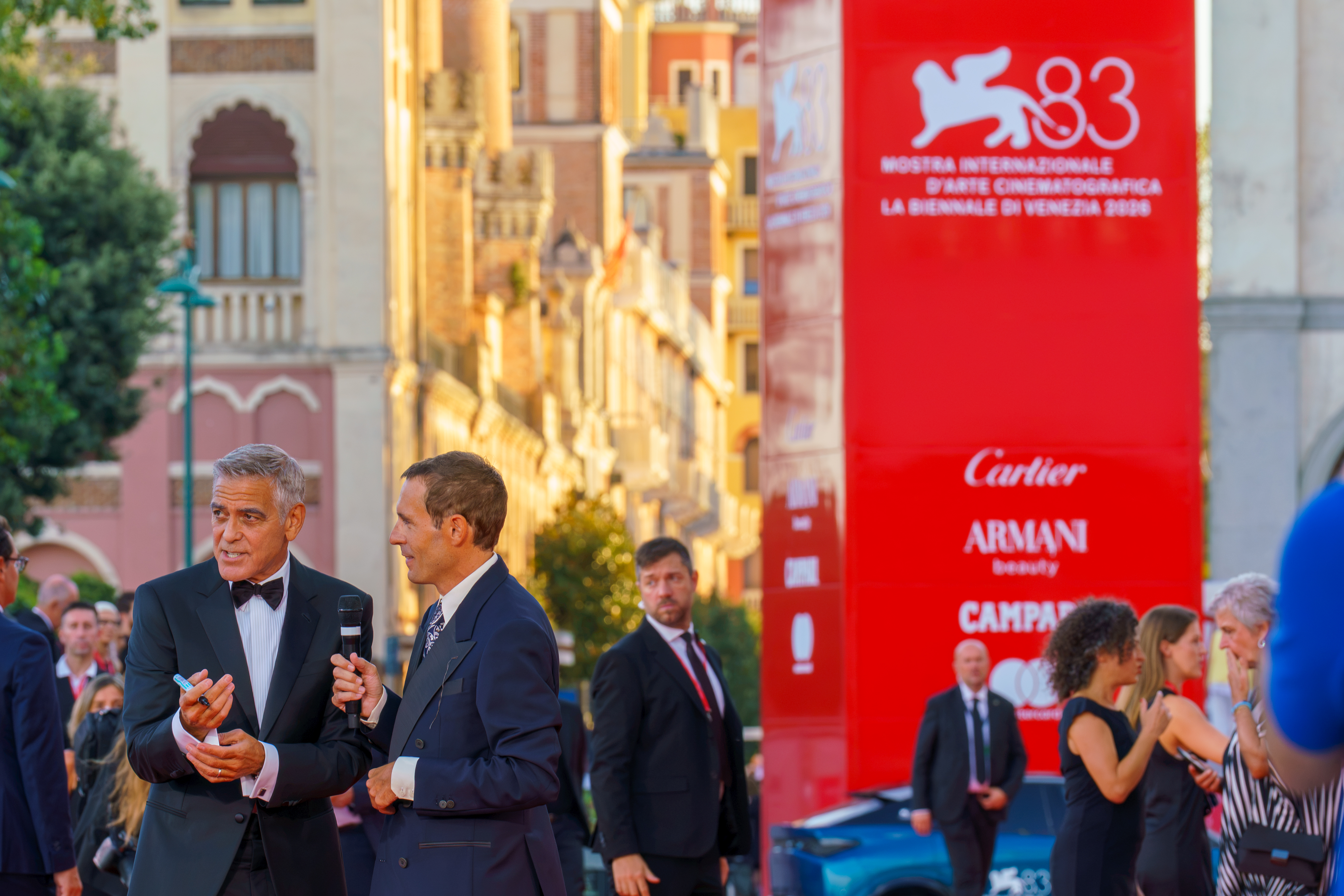
George Clooney, Golden Lion for Lifetime Achievement recipient, at the festival's red carpet

== Juries ==
Maggie Gyllenhaal, main competition Jury President

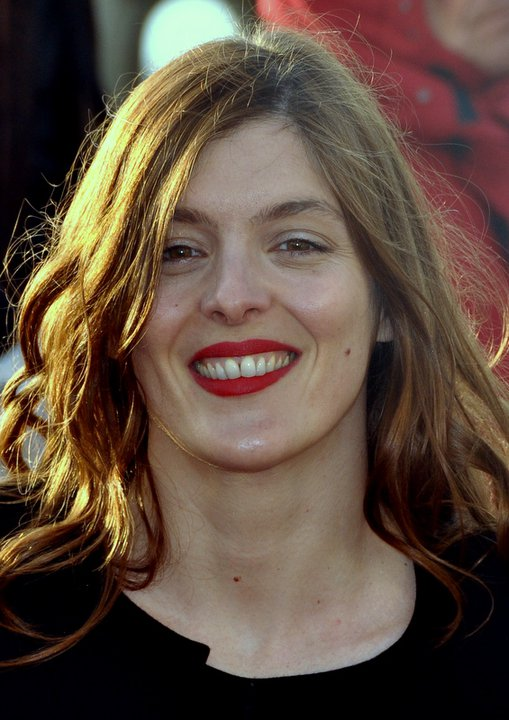
Valérie Donzelli, Orizzonti Jury President

=== Main Competition (Venezia 83) ===
- Maggie Gyllenhaal, American actress and filmmaker – Jury President
- Kaouther Ben Hania, Tunisian filmmaker
- Daniel Blumberg, English artist, musician and composer
- Francesco Casetti, Italian-American film theorist
- Xavier Giannoli, French filmmaker
- Shahrbanoo Sadat, Afghan filmmaker
- Johnnie To, Hong Kong filmmaker

=== Orizzonti ===
- Valérie Donzelli, French actress and filmmaker – Jury President
- Peter Becker, American film executive, and CEO of The Criterion Collection and Janus Films
- Elizabeth Lo, Hong Kong filmmaker
- David Pablos, Mexican filmmaker
- Barbara Ronchi, Italian actress

=== Lion of the Future (Luigi De Laurentiis Award for a Debut Film) ===
- Carolina Cavalli, Italian filmmaker – Jury President
- Akinola Davies Jr., British-Nigerian filmmaker and visual artist
- Ted Hope, American producer

=== Venice Classics ===
- Daniele Vicari, Italian filmmaker and producer – Jury President

=== Venice Immersive ===
- Paul Raphaël, Canadian artist and virtual reality creator – Jury President
- Négar Motevalymeidanshah, Iranian director, animator, and visual artist
- Kate Voet, Belgian artist and director

=== Giornate degli Autori ===
- Carla Simón, Spanish filmmaker – Jury President
- Hania Mroué, Lebanese programmer and distributor
- Sara Fgaier, Italian filmmaker, editor, archival researcher, and producer

=== Queer Lion ===
- Daniel N. Casagrande, Italian journalist and film critic
- Marco Busato, Italian actor
- Jani Kuštrin, Italian programmer
- Adriano Virone, Italian programmer and activist

== Official Selection ==
=== In Competition (Venezia 83) ===
The following twenty-one films were selected to the main competition for the Golden Lion:

English Title	Original Title	Director(s)	Production Country
Back to Buenos Aires	Ritorno a Buenos Aires	Marco Bechis	Italy, Brazil
A Bit of Light	کمی نور	Ali Asgari	Iran, Switzerland, Italy, Canada, Turkey
Bucking Fastard		Werner Herzog	Ireland, United States
Bunker		Florian Zeller	France, Spain
Company		Casey Affleck	United States, Canada, Romania, Italy, United Arab Emirates
DAU		Ilya Khrzhanovsky	Germany, France, Sweden, Russia
The Echo Chamber		Andrea Pallaoro	Italy, Belgium
The Fire Within You	Il fuoco che ti porti dentro	Edoardo De Angelis	Italy
A Good Little Soldier	Un bon petit soldat	Stéphane Brizé	France
Ink (opening film)		Danny Boyle	United Kingdom, United States
It Will Happen Tonight	Succederà questa notte	Nanni Moretti	Italy, France, Spain
Look Back	ルックバック	Hirokazu Kore-eda	Japan
Mr. Nelson, Did You Kill People?	ネルソンさん、あなたは人を殺しましたか？	Shinya Tsukamoto	Japan, United States, Thailand, Vietnam
NAZA		Yuval Abraham and Rachel Szor	United Kingdom
One Minute to Midnight	Un peu avant minuit	Nicolas Pariser	France
A Place to Heal	15/18	Cédric Kahn	France
Possible Love	가능한 사랑	Lee Chang-dong	South Korea, United States
Primetime		Lance Oppenheim	United States
The Spiral	L'estranea	Paolo Strippoli	Italy, France, Belgium
Wild Horse Nine		Martin McDonagh	United Kingdom, United States, Chile
Woman Unknown	Kvinde, ukendt	May el-Toukhy	Denmark, Sweden, Latvia

=== Venice Open — Out of Competition ===
The following films were selected to be screened out of competition:

English Title	Original Title	Director(s)	Production Country
Fiction
Arrested Memory	狂忘警探	Sabu	Taiwan, Japan
The Basics of Philosophy		Paul Schrader	United States
Father Joe		Barthélémy Grossmann	France
God Laughs (closing film)	Dio ride	Giovanni Veronesi	Italy
The Good Lawyer	Un bon avocat	Tristan Séguéla	France
Jupiter		Alexandre Smia	France
Let Us Through, Dear Ancestors	Makikiraan po	Lav Diaz	Philippines
No Pain	Nessun dolore	Gianni Amelio	Italy
No Paradise If You Are Killed by a Woman	بەهەشت نابینیت ئەگەر ژن بتکوژێت	Halkawt Mustafa	Norway, Iraq, United Arab Emirates, Sweden
Place to Be		Kornél Mundruczó	United States, Australia, Singapore
Trick	Scherzetto	Mario Martone	Italy
Non Fiction
Be Brave		Francesco Carrozzini	Italy
Boatbuilders		Luke Lorentzen	United States
Burgundy		Michael Dweck and Gregory Kershaw	France
Citizen Osama	المواطن أسامة	Ahmed Hassouna	Palestine, France
Dust	微塵	Tsai Ming-liang	Taiwan, Spain
Everest: The Other Side		Elizabeth Chai Vasarhelyi and Jimmy Chin	United States, China, Nepal
From Inside Out – The Architecture of Peter Zumthor	Das Geheimnis der Orte	Wim Wenders	Germany, Switzerland
Holy Wood Dust		Viktor Kossakovsky	Italy, Germany, Spain
Imperium		Sergei Loznitsa	France, Italy, Germany, Lithuania
Letters from the Silenced Country	Listy	Andrei Kutsila	Poland, Germany, Lithuania
Life of Jorge Luis Borges	Biografía de Jorge Luis Borges	Mariano Llinás	Argentina
Musk		Alex Gibney	United Kingdom, United States
My Undesirable Friends: Part II – Exile		Julia Loktev	United States
Oasis: Don't Look Back in Anger		Dylan Southern and Will Lovelace	United Kingdom
Queer Edward II		Theo Rollason	United Kingdom
The Road to Jericho		Amos Gitai	France, United Kingdom, Israel
Shumei. The Living Legacy of Kabuki	襲名	Takashi Miike	Japan
Union Town		Barbara Kopple	United States
What Love Builds		Russell Crowe	Australia
Films on Films
Intermission	中场休息	Yonfan	Hong Kong
Joie de vivre	Joie de vivre. Appunti, pensieri, parole, riflessioni, volti, visioni su Bernardo Bertolucci e la cinefilia del 20° secolo che non esiste più	Luca Guadagnino	Italy
	Juso per ferie	Karen Di Porto	Italy
Nino – A Film About Nino Rota	Nino – Un film su Nino Rota	Walter Fasano	Italy
The Pervert's Guide to Utopias		Sophie Fiennes	Ireland, United Kingdom, Slovenia, Netherlands, Norway
Twist and Shoot Mister Suzuki		Yves Montmayeur	France, Japan, United Kingdom
Short Films
Flesh Impact		Maggie Gyllenhaal	United States
They're Here		Laura Poitras and Rachel Lauren Mueller	United States
Wild Asparagus	Halayon	Avi Mograbi	Portugal, France
Series
Peccato (3 episodes)		Valerio Vestoso	Italy
Special Events
	Dai nostri inviati. La Rai racconta la Mostra del Cinema di Venezia 2001-2012	Giuseppe Giannotti, Enrico Salvatori and Nicoletta Berardi	Italy
Hugo in Venice	Il desiderio di essere inutile - Hugo a Venezia	Stefano Knuchel	Switzerland

=== Orizzonti ===
The section usually features a feature film competition of upcoming filmmakers, usually first or second works, with focus on global independent cinema. The Girl with the Leica, directed by Alina Marazzi, was the section's opening film on 2 September. The following films were selected:

English Title	Original Title	Director(s)	Production Country
In Competition
Big Little Things	谎言生活	Michelle Zhou	China, Hong Kong, United States
The Burning Giants	ยักษ์ไหม้	Phuttiphong Aroonpheng	Thailand, France, Singapore, Netherlands
Children of the Monkey	I figli della scimmia	Tommaso Landucci	Italy
The City of the Living	La città dei vivi	Edoardo Gabbriellini	Italy
The Color of the Sun	太陽ぬ色	Xavier Tera	Canada, Italy, Japan
A Common Story	Una storia	Anna Foglietta	Italy
A Day in the Life of Jo: Chapter Phaedra	Mia mera sti zoi tis tzo: kefalaio Faidra	Jacqueline Lentzou	Greece, Germany, France
Diane in the Loop	Un détour par Diane	Ann Sirot and Raphaël Balboni	Belgium, France
The Difficult Bride		Rubaiyat Hossain	Bangladesh, France, Portugal, Norway, Germany
Eklipse		Manuel Wetscher	Austria, Italy
Falling House	مراقب	Mohsen Gharaei	Iran, United States, Germany
The Girl with the Leica (opening film)	La ragazza con la Leica	Alina Marazzi	Italy, Germany
House of the Wind	La maison du vent	Bernard Auguste Kouemo Yanghu	Cameroon, France, Belgium, Benin, Saudi Arabia, Qatar
Lovers in the Blue Night		Anuparna Roy	India, United States
La Moula		Jérôme Pierrat	France
Oasis	Oase	Jannis Lenz	Germany, Austria
Too Much Sugar		Robert Greene	United States
Until the Day Ends	Do kraja dana	Jelena Maksimović	Serbia, Bulgaria, Slovenia, Montenegro, Croatia, Germany
What Belongs to Others	Cudze rzeczy	Grzegorz Dębowski	Poland
Short Films Competition
Angelo azzuro		Tommaso Acquarone	Italy
Distant Blue	Bleu au loin	Amir Houshang Moein	France
A Few Moments of Happiness	Quelques instants de bonheur	Shaden Safieddine Tazi	France, United Kingdom
A Fortress	Una fortaleza	Alba Gaviraghi	Chile
Head of a Camel		Shannon Lee	United States
Man-Made Lake	人工湖	Annie Ning	United States, China
Mothmama		Jessica Di Costa	Australia
Paper Plane		Saoirse Ronan	United Kingdom, Ireland
Los poderes		Salim Jaller	Colombia, France
Rock, Paper, Scissors	Sasso, carta, forbici	Virginia Mori	Italy, France
Silence	Тиша	Pavlo Shpegun	Ukraine
Test Track	Tesztpálya	Lydia Cornett	Hungary, United Kingdom, United States
Tropic of the Mourning Gecko	Τροπικός του Θρηνούτος Γκέκο	Stavros Markoulakis	Greece, France, Netherlands
Short Films — Out of Competition
The Sense of Earth	Il senso della Terra	Alessandro Ingaria and Simone Massi	Italy
Sounds From Home		Nathan Silver	France, United States

=== Venice Spotlight ===
Formerly called Orizzonti Extra, the section was officially renamed Venice Spotlight in the last edition. This collateral section programs independent films with commercial appeal from newcomers filmmakers or internationally established ones. It is also the only section where the audience votes to decide its winner. The following films were selected to compete for the Audience Award:

English Title	Original Title	Director(s)	Production Country
Conversation with the Sea	حوار مع البحر	Muayad Alayan	Palestine, Netherlands, Saudi Arabia, Qatar
Furies	غضب	Rami Kodeih	Lebanon, Brazil
Ground Floor	Földszint	Gábor Reisz	Hungary, Italy
Guria	გურია	Levan Koguashvili	Georgia, Switzerland, Luxembourg, Bulgaria, Turkey, Norway, Saudi Arabia
Hombre al agua		Gael García Bernal	Mexico
I Matter	Eu contez	Alina Șerban	Romania, Germany, Belgium
Serpenti		Roberto De Paolis	Italy
Sumo: Spirit Weighs Nothing		Erik Shirai	Japan, United States, Denmark, United Kingdom

=== Venice Classics ===
In a tribute to the Italian filmmaker Tinto Brass, the festival's pre-opening film was the restored 4K print of Col cuore in gola (1967), originally presented out of competition at the 28th edition. The section is curated by Alberto Barbera in collaboration of Federico Gironi, and showcases new restorations of celebrated feature films.

Italian filmmaker Daniele Vicari will serve as Jury President over 24 students recommended by professors of film studies from various Italian universities and institutions, the group will award the prize for Best Restored Film. The following films were selected to the Venice Classics section:

English Title	Original Title	Director(s)	Production Country	Restored by
Ashes and Diamonds (1958)	Popiół i diament	Andrzej Wajda	Poland	Di Factory
The Blue Eyes of Yonta (1991)	Udju Azul di Yonta	Flora Gomes	Guinea-Bissau, Portugal, France, United Kingdom	Cinemateca Portuguesa
The Catch (1983)	魚影の群れ	Shinji Sōmai	Japan	Shochiku MediaWorX Inc.
Cul-de-sac (1966)		Roman Polanski	United Kingdom	Fixafilm
Deadly Sweet (1967) (opening film)	Col cuore in gola	Tinto Brass	Italy, France	Centro Sperimentale di Cinematografia, Netflix
Down and Dirty (1976)	Brutti, sporchi e cattivi	Ettore Scola	Italy	Surf Film SRL, Centro Sperimentale di Cinematografia, Cineteca di Bologna
English, August (1994)		Dev Benegal	India	Film Heritage Foundation
Illusion Travels by Streetcar (1954)	La ilusión viaja en tranvía	Luis Buñuel	Mexico	National Museum of Cinema, Fundación Televisa, Cineteca Nacional México
Journey to Italy (1954)	Viaggio in Italia	Roberto Rossellini	Italy, France	Cinecittà S.p.A
Long Night in 1943 (1960)	La lunga notte del '43	Florestano Vancini	Italy	Cineteca di Bologna, Compass Film
Minnie and Moskowitz (1971)		John Cassavetes	United States	Universal Pictures
On the Beat (1995)	民警故事	Ning Ying	China	China Film Archive
The Story of Woo Viet (1981)	胡越的故事	Ann Hui	Hong Kong, Philippines, Vietnam	M Plus Museum Limited
To Be or Not to Be (1942)		Ernst Lubitsch	United States	Studiocanal
Those at Table 10 (1960)	Los de la mesa 10	Simón Feldman	Argentina	Asociación Amigos Museo del Cine de Buenos Aires
The Uncle from Brooklyn (1995)	Lo Zio di Brooklyn	Ciprì & Maresco	Italy	Cineteca di Bologna, Filmauro
Valerie and Her Week of Wonders (1970)	Valerie a týden divů	Jaromil Jireš	Czechoslovakia	Czech Film Archive
The Wild Angels (1966)		Roger Corman	United States	Amazon MGM Studios
Yesterday Girl (1966)	Abschied von gestern	Alexander Kluge	West Germany	Kairos-Film

=== Venice Immersive ===
The section is entirely devoted to immersive media and includes all XR means of creative expression, from 360° videos to XR works of any length, including installations and virtual worlds. The following projects were selected for the 10th edition of Venice Immersive:

English Title	Original Title	Director(s)	Production Country
In Competition
Amsterdam 1652: The Hands of the City		Nienke Huitenga-Broeren	Netherlands, France
Anokhya: The Origin		Anand Kishore	India
Artou		Abderrahmane Sissako	France, Mauritania, Luxembourg
Back to the Experience		Jessien Huang	China
Being in You		Michał Stankiewicz	Poland
Bowie: Unseen Unheard		Denis O'Regan and Nick Ryan	United Kingdom
DisneyNature's Wolf: An Immersive Experience		Jeff Wilson	United Kingdom, United States, Canada
Empire at Sea		Peter Flaherty	United States
Everest: The First Ascent		Jean Dellac and Benjamin Auriche	France
Eyes of Shame	Gédos Akys	Tomas Tamošaitis	Lithuania, France, Croatia
Finding Frida		Hilde K. Kjøs	Norway, Netherlands
Galapagos: The Last Eden		Anthony Geffen	United Kingdom
Haunts	Ôl	Lucy Hammond and Tomos Chetwode-Barton	United Kingdom
Honeyboys		Tibor de Jong	Netherlands, Belgium
Nel Blu		Fins	United States
Nevatars		Andy Serkis and Josh Youssef	United Kingdom, United States, Argentina
Nothing to See Here		Celine Daemen	Netherlands
Nox		Rio Nakada	Japan
Octopocalypse		Max Sacker and Arite Szadkowski	Germany
The Pigeon Ring	鸽环	Zhang Yuqi and Shixin Tao	China
Out of the Ashes		Rory Mitchell and Nonny de la Peña	United States
OutRenoir		Gordon	France
Shifting Connections	變動的連結	Chou Tung-Yen	Taiwan
Smithsonian Starstruck: An Immersive Experience		Elliott Mizroch	United Kingdom, United States
Solwata		Felix Gaedtke and Gayatri Parameswaran	United States, Germany, Australia
Sunset Motel		Gilles Jobin	Switzerland, France
Tomori		Misa Haru	Japan
Ulrica		Hongbo Cai	United States, Mexico, Micronesia
We Shall Return	Raj'In	Faiz Abu Rmeleh and Keren Manor	Germany, Palestina
Yesterday Maybe		Matthieu Van Eeckhout	France
Out of Competition — Best of Experiences
The Amusement		Eike Langbehn and Marc Barnes	Germany, France
Crafting Crimes		Chloé Rochereuil	France, United States
Hotel Infinity		William Chyr	United States
In 36,000 Ways		Karim Ben Khelifa	Germany
Little Nightmares VR: Altered Echoes		Lucas Roussel	France
Of Woman Born		Nalini Malani	India
Spomyny		Sophia Bulgakova	Netherlands, Ukraine
Spymaster		Jeremy Moirano	France
Voooooo---Peeeeee---		Jiyun Park and Hyeunjoo Woo	South Korea
Special Events
La Laguna Parla		Steye Hallema	Netherlands

=== Biennale College Cinema ===
The following films were selected for the Biennale College Cinema section:

English Title	Original Title	Director(s)	Production Country
Demeter in Exil	Demetra in esilio	Maria Giovanna Cicciari	Italy
Gu Shi	故事	Amie Song	United States, Hong Kong, Thailand
Moonfish		Daniel Zvereff	United States
Tijuana, Todavía		Gabriel Gutierrez Morales	Mexico
Immersive — Out of Competition
Desert Palms		Tristan Seniuk and John Gerard	United States
Library of Dreams		Zhenya Rzheznikova	Israel, Germany
The White Saboteur		Barthelemy Antoine-Loeff and Hugo Arcier	France, Germany

=== Final Cut ===
The section is providing since 2013 support for independent filmmakers from Africa and the Middle East. The following six work-in-progress films have been selected for the 14th edition of Final Cut in Venice:

English Title	Original Title	Director(s)	Production Country
Eldorado: The Taste of the South	Eldorado, le goût du sud	Alaa Eddine Aljem	Morocco, France, Italy, Norway
Madi Makambu		Machérie Ekwa Bahango	Democratic Republic of the Congo, France, Belgium
Mehal Sefari		Abraham Gezahagne	Ethiopia, Canada, Germany, Netherlands, Norway, Saudi Arabia
Occupational Hazards	الاحتلال والحال	Bassel Ghandour	Jordan, Qatar, United Kingdom, Saudi Arabia, Palestine
Plague	بلاء	Youssef Chebbi	Tunisia, France, Qatar, Saudi Arabia, Slovenia
A Quarter to Thursday	Jeudi moins le quart	Sofia Djama	Algeria, France, Belgium

== Independent Sections ==
=== 41. Settimana Internazionale della Critica ===
The following films were selected to the International Critics’ Week sections:

English Title	Original Title	Director(s)	Production Title
In Competition
Before the War	Prima Della Guerra	Tommaso Usberti	France, Italy
The End of Times	El fin de los tiempos	Bibiana Rojas Gómez and Juan David Cárdenas	Colombia
The H@llow Man		Kamel Laaridhi	Tunisia
London		Victor Di Marco and Márcio Picoli	Brazil
Meteorite	Meteorito	Sebastián Múnera	Colombia
Our Share of Sand		Shalini Adnani	India, United Kingdom, Greece
Zoom In, Zoom Out	发现之旅	Dong Jie	China
Special Events
Giaffa the Great (opening film)	Il Grande Giaffa	Marco Santi	Italy
Rider (closing film)		Roan Johnson and Davide Pavanello	Italy
SIC Short Italian Cinema
Crabkind	Granchità	Anaïs Landriscina and Chiara Toffoletto	Italy
Eggshells	Gusci	Elisa Chiari and Francesca Trovato	Italy
E-I-E-I-O		Noemi Arfuso	Italy
If Things Could Ever Talk	Se mai le cose	Giulia Cosentino	Italy, France
Puca		Sara Scalera	Italy
Revolver		Paoli De Luca	Italy
Where the Tears Await	Dove le lacrime aspettano	Caterina Bertini and Blu Diego Fasoli	Italy
Special Events — Short Films
A Brief Encounter (closing short film)	Un breve incontro	Liryc Dela Cruz	Italy
Les métamorphoses, au féminin (opening short film)		Maria Giménez Cavallo	Italy, France, United States

=== 23rd Giornate degli Autori ===
The lineup was selected from 1,036 submissions from 114 countries, featuring 25 world premieres, with a record 14 productions directed by women selected. Ten films are in competition for the GdA Director's Award, and nine Italian titles were selected for the Venetian Nights program. Alongside the usual focus on newcomers, veteran French filmmaker Robert Guédiguian's 25th feature film A Woman Today marks his first feature film selected for the section. My Notes on Mars, directed by Hungarian filmmaker Lili Horvát, was the section's opening film on 2 September. While A Man's Skin, directed by French filmmaker Léa Domenach, will be the section's closing film on 11 September.

The following films were selected for the 23rd edition of the Giornate degli Autori:

English Title	Original Title	Director(s)	Production Title
In Competition
Agata the Writer		Kuba Dorabialski	Australia
Balkan	Balcanica	Nicola Sorcinelli	Italy, Serbia, Croatia
Camouflage		Mykyta Gibalenko	Germany
Dear Ajayi		Damilola Orimogunje	Nigeria, Germany
The Indies	Les Indes	Pauline Julier and Nicolas Chapoulier	Switzerland, Spain
I Plant My Hand in the Garden		Boris Hadžija and Hoda Taheri	Germany, Serbia, United States
My Notes on Mars (opening film)		Lili Horvát	Hungary, Austria
Sometimes Sadness, Sometimes Rebellion	A veces me entra tristeza, otras veces rebelión	María Aparicio	Argentina, Spain
	Salón de Belleza	Nathalia Acevedo	Mexico, France
A Woman Today	Une femme aujourd'hui	Robert Guédiguian	France, Italy
Out of Competition
A Man's Skin (closing film)	Peau d'Homme	Léa Domenach	France
Special Events
Al Baraneya		Ashgan El-Hamus	Netherlands, Egypt, Belgium, Saudi Arabia
Carla Lonzi, A Feminist Story	Carla Lonzi, Dentro e Fuori dal Mondo	Francesca Archibugi	Italy
Even If Hell Came	Se Venisse Anche l'Inferno	Samuele Rossi	Italy
The Massacre	Il Massacro	Cosimo Messeri	Italy
The Phantom	El fantasma	Ignacio Masllorens and David Lamelas	Argentina
Miu Miu Women's Tales
#31 Discipline		Mona Fastvold	United States
#32 Avec Kim		Claire Denis	France
Venetian Nights
Auber 89		Giuseppe Schillaci	France, Italy
Anatomy of a Portrait	Anatomia di un Ritratto	Francesco Clerici and Mattia Colombo	Italy, Switzerland
Capital Sunday – Sunday Gen	Domenica Capitale – Genere Domenicale	Giovanna Giuliani	Italy
The Cat Wakes Up and Yawns; Then Love	Si Sveglia e Sbadiglia, il Gatto; Poi l'Amore	Federico Francioni and Samuele Sestieri	Italy
The Craft	Il Mestiere	Beppe Tufarulo	Italy, Belgium, France
The Legend of the Desert	La Leggenda del Deserto	Elisabetta Giannini	Italy
Memories of Lightning	Memoria del Lampo	Riccardo Giacconi	Italy
	Scarpe Rotte	Roberta Torre	Italy
Southern Peasants	Uno si Distrae al Bivio	Alessandra Lancellotti	Italy

== Official Awards ==
Golden Lion winner: May el-Toukhy

Grand Jury Prize winner: Lee Chang-dong

Special Jury Prize winners: Yuval Abraham and Rachel Szor

Silver Lion winner: Ilya Khrzhanovsky

Volpi Cup for Best Actress winner: Mathilde Arcel

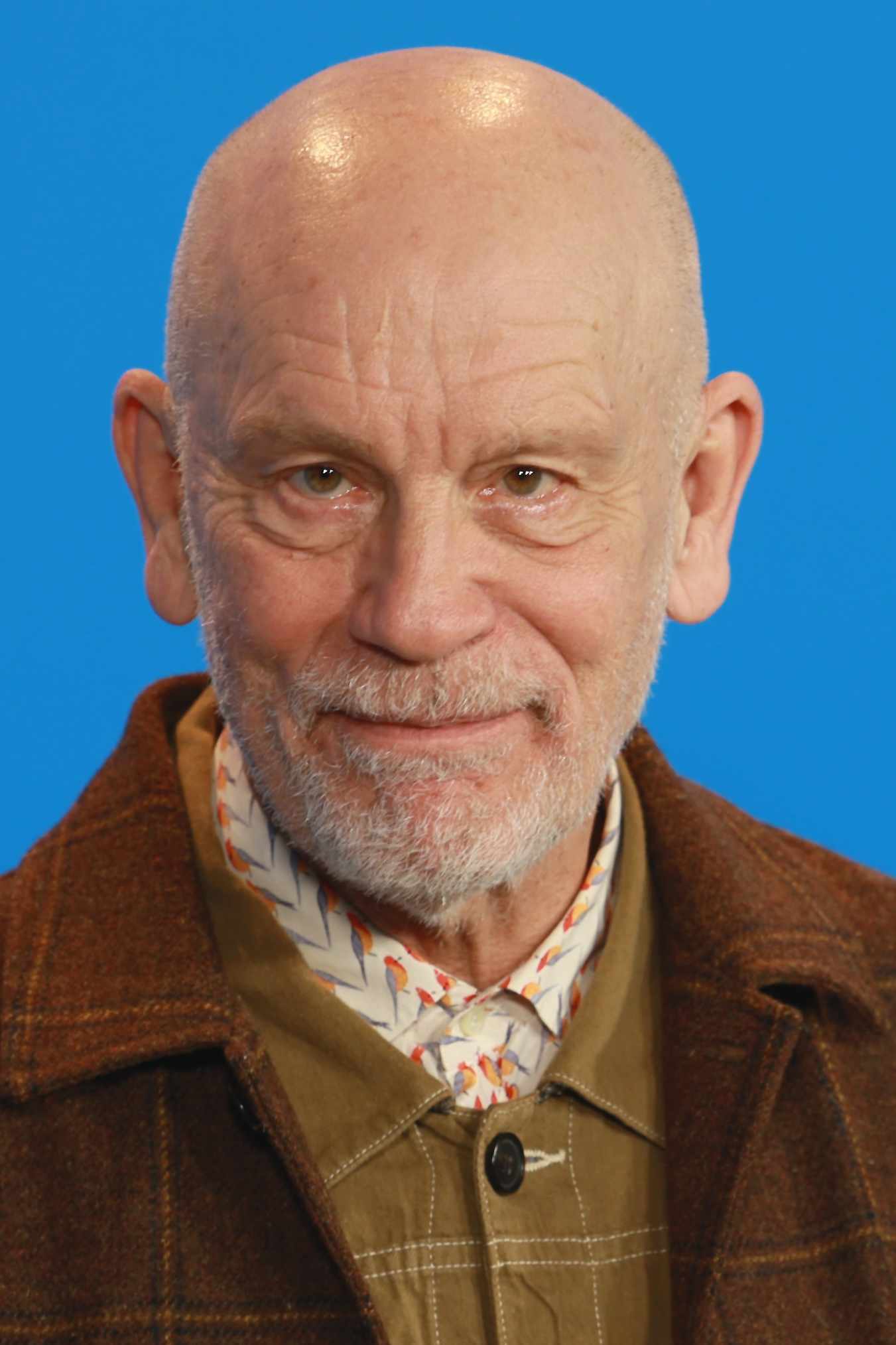
Volpi Cup for Best Actor winner: John Malkovich

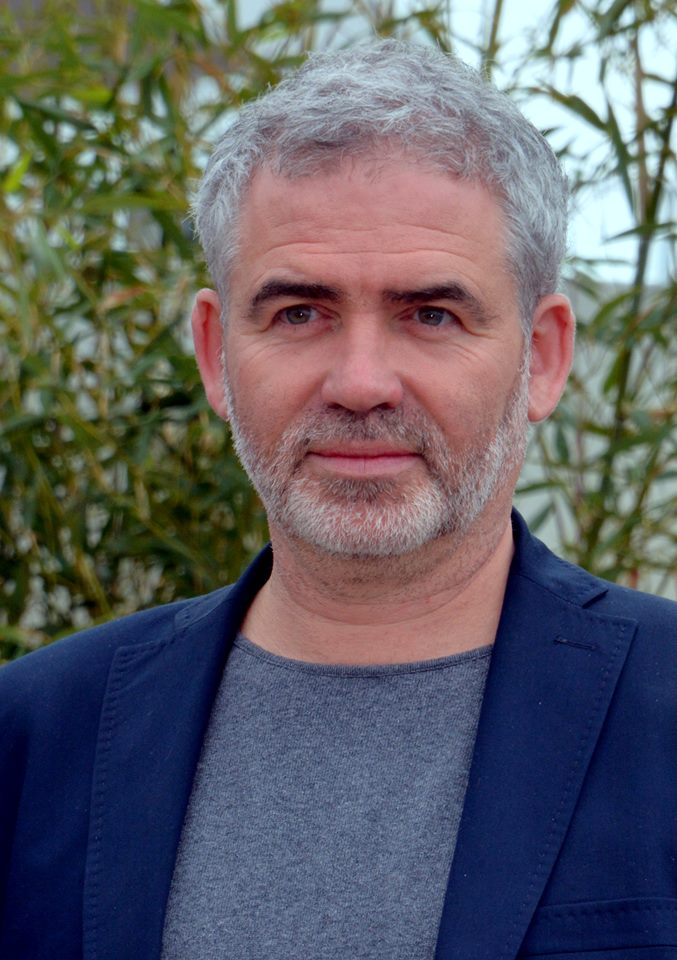
Best Screenplay winner: Stéphane Brizé

Marcello Mastroianni Award winner: Malou Khebizi

Golden Lion for Lifetime Achievement recipient: George Clooney

Orizzonti for Best Film winner: Ann Sirot and Raphaël Balboni

=== Main Competition (Venezia 83) ===
- Golden Lion: Woman Unknown by May el-Toukhy
- Grand Jury Prize: Possible Love by Lee Chang-dong
- Special Jury Prize: NAZA by Yuval Abraham and Rachel Szor
- Silver Lion: Ilya Khrzhanovsky for DAU
- Volpi Cup for Best Actress: Mathilde Arcel for Woman Unknown
- Volpi Cup for Best Actor: John Malkovich for Wild Horse Nine
- Best Screenplay: Coralie Amedeo, Stéphane Brizé and Olivier Gorce for A Good Little Soldier
- Marcello Mastroianni Award: Malou Khebizi for A Place to Heal

=== Golden Lion for Lifetime Achievement ===
- Ellen Burstyn
- George Clooney

=== Orizzonti ===
- Best Film: Diane in the Loop by Ann Sirot and Raphaël Balboni
- Best Director: Jacqueline Lentzou for A Day in the Life of Jo: Chapter Phaedra
- Special Jury Prize: House of the Wind by Bernard Auguste Kouemo Yanghu
- Best Actress: Laleh Marzban for Falling House
- Best Actor: Riccardo Scamarcio for Children of the Monkey
- Best Screenplay: Tommaso Landucci and Damiano Femfert for Children of the Monkey
- Best Short Film: A Few Moments of Happiness by Shaden Safieddine Tazi

=== Venice Spotlight ===
- Audience Award: I Matter by Alina Șerban

=== Lion of the Future ===
- Luigi De Laurentiis Award: House of the Wind by Bernard Auguste Kouemo Yanghu

=== Venice Classics ===
- Best Restored Film: Long Night in 1943 (1960) by Florestano Vancini

=== Venice Immersive ===
- Grand Prize: The Pigeon Ring by Zhang Yuqi and Shixin Tao
- Special Jury Prize: Out of the Ashes by Rory Mitchell and Nonny de la Peña
- Achievement Prize: Empire at Sea by Peter Flaherty

=== Glory to the Filmmaker ===
- Luca Guadagnino

=== Final Cut in Venice ===
- Madi Makambu by Machérie Ekwa Bahango

== Independent Awards ==
=== International Critics' Week ===
- Grand Prize: Before the War by Tommaso Usberti
  - Special Mention: The End of Times by Bibiana Rojas Gómez and Juan David Cárdenas
- Audience Award: Our Share of Sand by Shalini Adnani
- Best Technical Contribution: The End of Times by Bibiana Rojas Gómez and Juan David Cárdenas
- Luciano Sovena Award for Best Independent Producer: Before the War
- Best Short Film SIC@SIC: E-I-E-I-O by Noemi Arfuso
  - Special Mention: Where the Tears Await by Caterina Bertini and Blu Diego Fasoli
- Best Short Film Director SIC@SIC: Revolver by Paoli De Luca

=== Giornate degli Autori ===
- GdA Director's Award: Sometimes Sadness, Sometimes Rebellion by María Aparicio
- Europa Cinemas Label Award: A Woman Today by Robert Guédiguian
- People's Award: Balkan by Nicola Sorcinelli
- Carlo Lizzani Award: Balkan by Nicola Sorcinelli

=== Queer Lion ===
- London by Victor Di Marco and Márcio Picoli
- Queer Edward II by Theo Rollason

=== FIPRESCI Prizes ===
- Best Film from Venezia 83: Possible Love by Lee Chang-dong
- Best Film from Orizzonti or parallel sections: The Color of the Sun by Xavier Tera

=== ARCA CinemaGiovani Award ===
- Best Film of Venezia 83: Possible Love by Lee Chang-dong
- Best Italian Film in Venice: The Spiral by Paolo Strippoli

=== Airone della Laguna Award ===
- Best Film: Falling House by Mohsen Gharaei
- Best Short Film: Silence by Pavlo Shpegun
  - Special Mention:
    - The Sense of Earth by Alessandro Ingaria and Simone Massi
    - Los poderes by Salim Jaller

=== Authors under 40 Award dedicated to Valentina Pedicini ===
- Best Director:
  - Michelle Zhou for Big Little Things
  - María Aparicio for Sometimes Sadness, Sometimes Rebellion
- Special Mention for Direction and Screenplay: Shalini Adnani for Our Share of Sand
- Special Mention for Cinematography: Simone Hart for Eklipse

=== BookCiak Award ===
- The Fire Within You by Edoardo De Angelis

=== Brian Award ===
- Let Us Through, Dear Ancestors by Lav Diaz
  - Special Mention: No Paradise If You Are Killed by a Woman by Halkawt Mustafa

=== XXXVIII Prix CICT-UNESCO Enrico Fulchignoni – Medaglia Fellini 2026 ===
- Dear Ajayi by Damilola Orimogunje

=== Cinema & Arts Award ===
- Best Film:
  - Look Back by Hirokazu Kore-eda
  - Shumei. The Living Legacy of Kabuki by Takashi Miike
- Best Multidisciplinary Artist: Anatoly Vasiliev for DAU

=== CinemaSarà Award ===
- Look Back by Hirokazu Kore-eda

=== CROCE ROSSA ITALIANA Award ===
- A Place to Heal by Cédric Kahn

=== Edipo Re Award ===
- Award presented by the official jury: A Day in the Life of Jo: Chapter Phaedra by Jacqueline Lentzou
- Award presented by Ca' Foscari student jury: NAZA by Yuval Abraham and Rachel Szor

=== Fanheart3 Award ===
- Golden Clip for Best Film: A Man's Skin by Léa Domenach
- Silver Ship for Best OTP - One True Pairing: Chris and Lee, the characters of Wild Horse Nine by Martin McDonagh
- XR Fan Experience: Empire at Sea by Peter Flaherty
- Special Mention: Look Back by Hirokazu Kore-eda

=== FEDIC Award ===
- Best Film: Serpenti by Roberto De Paolis
- Best Short Film: If Things Could Ever Talk by Giulia Cosentino

=== Premio Speciale Film Impresa ===
- A Good Little Soldier by Stéphane Brizé

=== The Impact Golden Globes Prize for Documentary ===
- Letters from the Silenced Country by Andrei Kutsila

=== Green Drop Award ===
- NAZA by Yuval Abraham and Rachel Szor
- The Spiral by Paolo Strippoli

=== Interfilm Award for Promoting Interreligious Dialogue ===
- A Good Little Soldier by Stéphane Brizé

=== Lanterna Magica Award ===
- A Place to Heal by Cédric Kahn

=== Leoncino d'Oro Award ===
- Mr. Nelson, Did You Kill People? by Shinya Tsukamoto
- Mention Cinema for UNICEF: NAZA by Yuval Abraham and Rachel Szor

=== Carlo Lizzani Award ===
- Balkan by Nicola Sorcinelli

=== NETPAC Award ===
- Lovers in the Blue Night by Anuparna Roy

=== NUOVOIMAIE TALENT AWARD – PREMIO FABIO SARTOR ===
- Best Actress: Gaia Merlonghi for The City of the Living
- Best Actor: Piero Usberti for Before the War

=== Award Francesco Pasinetti ===
- Back to Buenos Aires by Marco Bechis
- Best Actress: Vanessa Scalera for The Fire Within You
- Best Actor: Adriano Giannini for Back to Buenos Aires
- Pasinetti Special prize: The Girl with the Leica by Alina Marazzi

=== La Pellicola d'Oro Award ===
- Best Chief Engineer: Roberto Di Pietro for The Echo Chamber
- Best Machine Operator: Luigi Andrei for It Will Happen Tonight
  - Special Mention: Laura Delli Colli

=== RB Casting Award ===
- Emanuelle Maria Di Stefano for The City of the Living

=== "Roma Film Award – Il Lazio per il cinema" ===
- Adriano Giannini

=== SIGNIS Award ===
- Look Back by Hirokazu Kore-eda

=== Sorriso Diverso Venezia Award ===
- Best Foreign Film: A Good Little Soldier by Stéphane Brizé
- Best Italian Film: Rider by Roan Johnson and Davide Pavanello
- Best Director Under 35: NAZA by Yuval Abraham and Rachel Szor

=== Soundtrack Stars Award ===
- Best Soundtrack: La Niña and Alfredo Maddaluno for The Fire Within You
- Special Prize: Daniel Pemberton for Ink
- Soundtrack Stars Special Award 2026:
  - Daniel Blumberg
  - Tredici Pietro

=== UNIMED Award ===
- Look Back by Hirokazu Kore-eda

=== Robert Bresson Award ===
- Pedro Costa

=== Campari Passion for Film Award ===
- Serena Rossi

=== 1964 Pop Art Award ===
- The Girl with the Leica by Alina Marazzi

=== Bisato d'Oro ===
- Grand Jury Prize: Oase by Jannis Lenz
