= Lovers in the Blue Night =

2026 drama film by Anuparna Roy

- Official poster
- Directed by: Anuparna Roy
- Screenplay by: Nikhil Lama; Anuparna Roy
- Produced by: Vikas Kumar; Sharib Khan; Bibhanshu Rai; Romil Modi; Rhet Topham
- Starring: Neelima Sharma; Kajal Keshav; Pritam Pilania; Jatin Sarin
- Cinematography: Debjit Samanta
- Edited by: Ketul Thakkar
- Music by: Nishant Ramtake
- Production companies: Khan & Kumar Media; Ammi Media
- Release date: 11 September 2026 (Venice)
- Running time: 108 minutes
- Countries: United States; India
- Languages: Hindi; Marathi; Sylhet; Bengali

Lovers in the Blue Night is a 2026 drama film directed by Anuparna Roy, and co-written with Nikhil Lama. A co-production between the United States and India, it stars Neelima Sharma, Pritam Pilania, Bhushan Shimpi, Jatin Sarin, Kajal Keshav, and Vinod Suryavanshi. Set amid Mumbai's restless nightlife, it follows four immigrants whose lives intertwine.

The film had its world premiere in the Orizzonti section of the 83rd Venice International Film Festival on 11 September 2026.

== Synopsis ==
The story of the film explores loneliness, caste, migration, sexuality, poverty, desire, and the human need for love and belonging, showing that even in a harsh city, the search for tenderness can give people hope while also exposing them to pain and betrayal.

Four migrants live in Mumbai, Karim, Ameena, Sukka, and Omran, whose lonely lives become connected through love, desire, deception, and survival. Karim, a gay man trapped in a marriage of pity, secretly desires Sukka, a thief struggling against caste oppression. Ameena, desperate for affection, falls for the imagined writer of mysterious love letters, mistakenly believing that Omran is their author. Her mistake unexpectedly touches Omran’s own loneliness. Their intertwined stories show how people who have been denied love and security create their own dreams and illusions.

== Cast ==
- Neelima Sharma as Ameena
- Kajal Keshav
- Pritam Pilania
- Jatin Sarin
- Bhushan Shimpi
- Vinod Suryavanshi
- Swetha Mishra

== Production ==
In May 2026, Variety reported that film was complete as Anuparna Roy has wrapped up the film.

== Release ==
Lovers in the Blue Night had its world premiere in the Orizzonti section of the 83rd Venice International Film Festival on 11 September 2026. It was screened in 'A Window on Asian Cinema' section of the 31st Busan International Film Festival on 8 October 2026.

The film was screened for Japanese Premiere on 27 October 2026 in the Women’s Empowerment section of the 39th Tokyo International Film Festival.

Parallax acquired international sales rights to the film before its premiere on Venice International Film Festival.

== Accolades ==
Award	Date of ceremony	Category	Recipient(s)	Result	Ref.
Venice Film Festival	12 September 2026	Orizzonti Award for Best Film	Lovers in the Blue Night	Nominated	
Venice Film Festival	12 September 2026	NETPAC Award	Lovers in the Blue Night	Won	
