= The City of the Living =

2026 Italian drama film

- Theatrical release poster
- Italian: La città dei vivi
- Directed by: Edoardo Gabbriellini
- Screenplay by: Damiano and Fabio D'Innocenzo
- Based on: La città dei vivi by Nicola Lagioia
- Produced by: Roberto Proia; Olivia Musini; Maurizio Piazza; Andrea Calbucci
- Starring: Emanuele Maria Di Stefano; Gaia Merlonghi; Valerio Mastandrea; Simona Senzacqua; Roberta Mattei
- Cinematography: Amine Messadi
- Edited by: Jacopo Ramella Pajrin
- Production companies: Eagle Pictures; Cinemaundici; Lungta Film
- Distributed by: Eagle Pictures
- Release dates: 4 September 2026 (Venice); 1 October 2026 (Italy)
- Running time: 104 minutes
- Country: Italy
- Language: Italian

The City of the Living (Italian: La città dei vivi) is a 2026 Italian drama film directed by Edoardo Gabbriellini, written by Damiano and Fabio D'Innocenzo and based on the 2020 novel La città dei vivi by Nicola Lagioia. It stars Emanuele Maria Di Stefano, Gaia Merlonghi, Valerio Mastandrea, and Simona Senzacqua.

The film had its world premiere in the Orizzonti section of the 83rd Venice International Film Festival on 4 September 2026. It is scheduled to be theatrically released in Italy by Eagle Pictures on 1 October.

== Synopsis ==
Luca, a 23-year-old car mechanic, lives in La Storta, Rome. He lives happily with the family that adopted him and shares a close bond with his friends and girlfriend. As he moves between the suburbs and the city, he is trying to understand who he is and what he wants from life. Like many young people his age, he feels that his future is full of possibilities, yet also uncertain and confusing. During this period of self-discovery, Luca secretly leads a double life. One night, following what seems to be a simple chance encounter, his life suddenly changes forever when he becomes the victim of a brutal and senseless act of violence.

== Cast ==
- Emanuele Maria Di Stefano as Luca Varani
- Gaia Merlonghi as Marta
- Valerio Mastandrea as the father
- Simona Senzacqua as the mother
- Roberta Mattei

== Production ==
The film is loosely based on the 2020 novel La città dei vivi by Nicola Lagioia. It follows the tragic story of Luca Varani, a 23-year-old man who was killed in Rome on the night of 4th and 5th March 2016. Drawing on both the novel and the real-life news story that inspired it, the screenplay takes the event as its narrative starting point.

Filming began in March 2026 with a six weeks schedule in Rome.

== Release ==
The City of the Living had its world premiere in the Orizzonti section of the 83rd Venice International Film Festival on 4 September 2026. The film had its International Premiere in Centrepiece at the 2026 Toronto International Film Festival on 13 September 2026.

Subsequently it will be released in Italian cinemas by Eagle Pictures on 1 October 2026.

Rome-based PiperPlay acquired the international sales rights to the film before its world premiere in Orizzonti.

== Reception ==
=== Critical response ===
Variety's film critic Jay Weissberg hailed the film, calling it a "superbly acted" and "beautiful, heartrending film that sensitively builds a multifaceted character as real as any you’ll see". Eric Lavallée from IonCinema gave it 3 ½ stars over 5, noting how the film "can feel almost lyrical in its refusal to sensationalize", with Gabbriellini "favoring suggestion over exposition" and capturing "the cruelty of a coming-of-age story that never gets to finish". Italian critic Paolo Mereghetti similarly praised Gabbriellini’s ability to stir emotions while avoiding easy tricks and the "pornography of pain".

Reviewing at Venice International Film Festival for Cineuropa, Olivia Popp praised the film's bleak atmosphere and restrained treatment of the murder, particularly Edoardo Gabbriellini's avoidance of graphic imagery and sensationalism. She highlighted the use of static, "sterile moments" that "act almost as snapshots of memories" and noted that the film does not attribute the crime to the perpetrators' sexuality, instead focusing on their entitlement and drug use. Popp feels that the final 30 minutes are a "quiet denouement" that revisits the events rather than attempting to provide a definitive explanation for the tragedy.

=== Accolades ===
Award	Date of ceremony	Category	Recipient(s)	Result	Ref.
Venice Film Festival	12 September 2026	Orizzonti Award for Best Film	The City of the Living	Nominated	
Venice Film Festival	12 September 2026	NUOVOIMAIE TALENT AWARD – PREMIO FABIO SARTORi: Best Actress:	Gaia Merlonghi	Won	
Venice Film Festival	12 September 2026	RB Casting Award	Emanuelle Maria Di Stefano	Won	
