= Blood of My Blood (disambiguation) =

"Blood of My Blood" is an episode of American TV series Game of Thrones.

Blood of My Blood may also refer to:

- Blood of My Blood (2011 film), a Portuguese film
- Blood of My Blood (2015 film), an Italian film
- "Blood of My Blood" (Outlander episode), an episode of the fourth season of Outlander
- Outlander: Blood of My Blood, a television series that serves as a prequel spin-off from Outlander
