= Eklipse =

2026 drama film by Manuel Wetscher

- Directed by: Manuel Wetscher
- Written by: Bernhard Jarosch; Manuel Wetscher
- Produced by: Bernhard Holzhammer; Victor Kössl
- Starring: Moritz Hohlrieder; Finley Brown; Hannes Perkmann; Lisa Schützenberger
- Cinematography: Simone Hart
- Edited by: Anna Kirst
- Music by: Marco Schröder; Johannes Winkler
- Production companies: Eutopiafilm; Albolina Film
- Release date: September 5, 2026 (Venice)
- Running time: 91 minutes
- Countries: Austria; Italy
- Language: German

Eklipse is a 2026 coming-of-age drama film directed by Manuel Wetscher, in his feature directorial debut, co-written with Bernhard Jarosch. An Austrian–Italian co-production, it stars Moritz Hohlrieder and Finley Brown as two boys whose friendship is tested when the truth about the illness of one boy's father, who has AIDS, becomes known in their rural community.

The film had its world premiere in the Orizzonti section of the 83rd Venice International Film Festival on 5 September 2026.

== Premise ==
In August 1999, in the weeks leading up to the total solar eclipse, twelve-year-old Tomy spends the summer with his best friend Chris at a dairy farm run by his uncle Georg in the Tyrolean Alps. Tomy's father is in hospital, and his mother has chosen not to tell him the nature of the illness. When a rumour spreads in the village that his father is suffering from what locals call "the gay disease", Chris begins to shun Tomy, who does not understand why he is being pushed away.

== Cast ==
- Moritz Hohlrieder as Tomy
- Finley Brown as Chris
- Hannes Perkmann as Georg
- Lisa Schützenberger as Tomy's mother
- Lenz Moretti
- Barbara Romaner
- Lisa-Lena Tritscher
- Sebastian von Malfèr
- Michael Pascher

== Production ==
The film is partly autobiographical. Wetscher's father died of AIDS-related complications in the early 1990s, a fact the director only learned years later. The film incorporates VHS home-video footage of Wetscher's own family, including his late father.

Eklipse was produced by Bernhard Holzhammer and Victor Kössl for the Austrian company Eutopiafilm and the South Tyrol-based Albolina Film. It was shot in the Tyrolean Alps by cinematographer Simone Hart.

== Release ==
The cast and crew of the film at the 83rd Venice International Film Festival

The film had its world premiere in the Orizzonti section of the 83rd Venice International Film Festival on 5 September 2026. It was subsequently selected for the Centrepiece programme of the 2026 Toronto International Film Festival.

Ahead of the premiere, the Berlin-based company Films Boutique acquired international sales rights.

== Reception ==
Reviews from the Venice premiere were largely positive. Writing for Screen International, Wendy Ide described the film as an assured, intimate and honest debut, praising the two young leads, Hart's cinematography and the film's sound design, and comparing its child's-eye, autobiographical approach to Carla Simón's Summer 1993. Susanne Gottlieb of Cineuropa characterised it as a slow-burning, symbolically dense film that evokes the atmosphere of the late 1990s before its harsher realities surface. In Der Standard, Marian Wilhelm praised it as a personal and stylistically confident debut that handles the stigma surrounding AIDS without becoming didactic, and noted that its sunlit alpine imagery breaks with the bleakness typical of Austrian cinema on such subjects; he also singled out Schützenberger and Perkmann for their assured performances as the mother and uncle.

Matthew Turner of Next Best Picture gave the film an 8 out of 10, singling out the performances of Hohlrieder and Brown and Wetscher's direction, while noting that the understated climax might leave some viewers wanting more. Frank J. Avella of The Contending called it a sincere and contemplative study of small-town prejudice and praised Schützenberger's performance, though he felt some family relationships could have been established earlier for clarity. Marina Pavido of Cinema Austriaco rated it 7 out of 10, describing it as an insightful and mature work in which the director's contemplative, silence-led approach keeps his personal history from overwhelming the film. A more critical review in The Film Verdict found the film's reluctance to let its characters voice their feelings frustrating and its narrative thin, while crediting its atmospheric farm sequences.
