= Falling House =

2026 drama film by Mohsen Gharaei

- Persian: مراقب
- Directed by: Mohsen Gharaei
- Written by: Mohsen Gharaei; Amir Mohammad Abdi
- Produced by: Milad Khosravi; Mohsen Gharaei; Odessa Rae; Daya Fernández; Amaury Nolasco; Alois Rubenbauer
- Starring: Laleh Marzban; Rima Raminfar; Farhad Aslani; Elena Khakbazan
- Cinematography: Farshad Mohammadi
- Edited by: Evelyn Rack; Emad Khodabakhsh
- Music by: Max Richter
- Production companies: Seven Springs Pictures; RaeFilm Studios; 3SIX9 Studios; Basis Berlin Filmproduktion; Zentropa Germany
- Release date: 3 September 2026 (Venice)
- Running time: 124 minutes
- Countries: Iran; United States; Germany
- Language: Persian

Falling House (Persian: مراقب) is a 2026 drama film directed by Mohsen Gharaei, co-written with Amir Mohammad Abdi. A co-production of Iran, United States, and Germany, it stars Laleh Marzban, Rima Raminfar, Farhad Aslani and Elena Khakbazan.

The film had its world premiere in the Orizzonti section of the 83rd Venice International Film Festival on 3 September 2026, where it won the section's Best Actress award.

== Premise ==
A prison guard, Rashid, is suspended for an unforgivable mistake and discovers his elder daughter, Ensi, plans to emigrate to become a model. Determined to stop her, he attempts to prevent her from leaving.

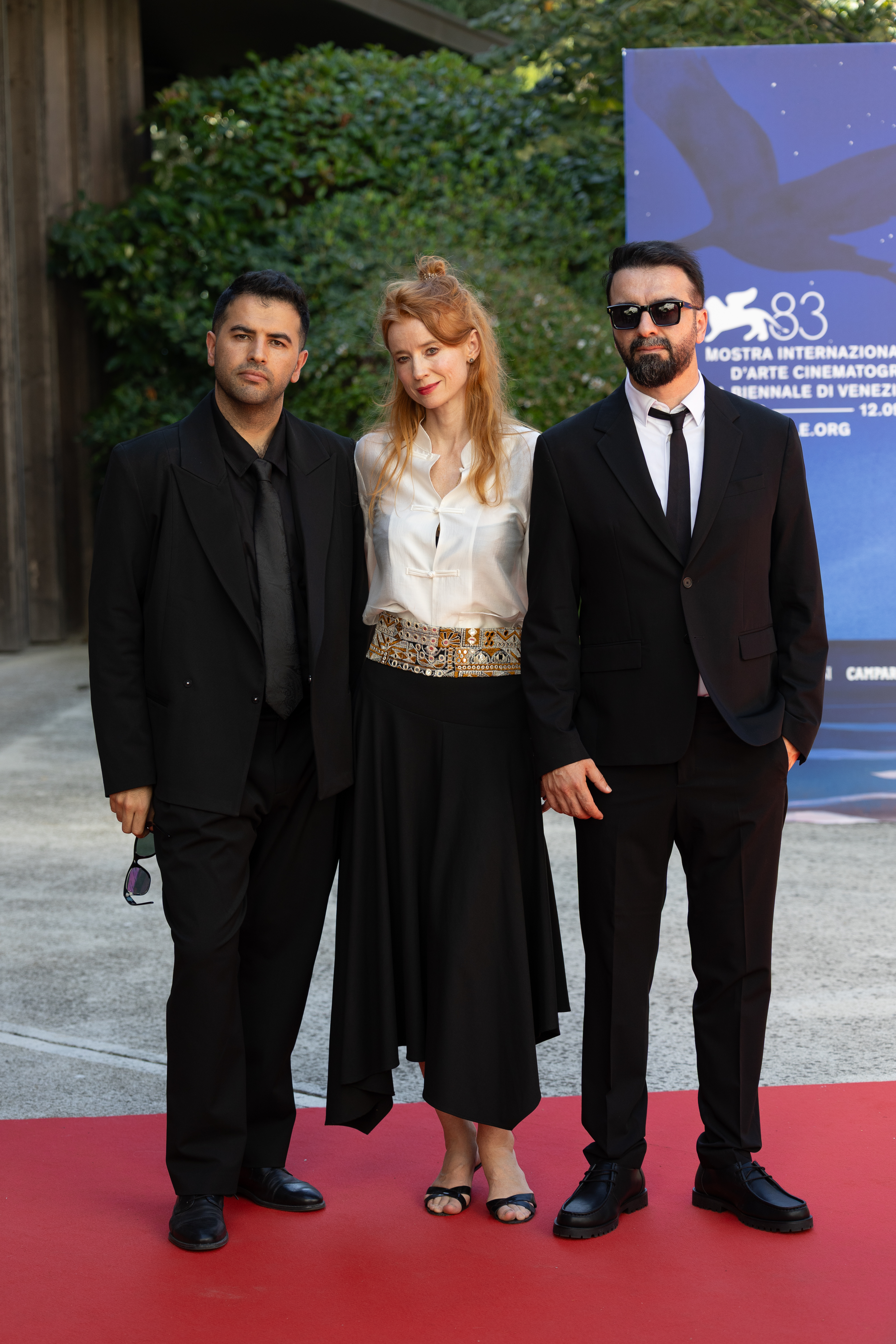
Milad Khosravi, Odessa Rae, and Mohsen Gharaei at 83rd Venice International Film Festival

== Cast ==
- Laleh Marzban as Ensi
- Rima Raminfar as Zinat
- Farhad Aslani as Rashid
- Elena Khakbazan as Janan
- Alireza Kamali
- Behzad Khalaj

== Production ==
Milad Khosravi, Odessa Rae, Daya Fernández, Amaury Nolasco and Alois Rubenbauer serve as producers, with Jon Kilik executive producing.

== Release ==
It had its world premiere in the Orizzonti section of the 83rd Venice International Film Festival on 3 September 2026.

== Accolades ==
Year	Award	Category	Nominee(s)	Result	Ref.
2026	23rd Seville European Film Festival	Grand Jury Prize	Falling House	Won	
2026	23rd Seville European Film Festival	Prize for Best Editing	Evelyn Rack, Emad Khodabakhsh	Won	
