= Nicola Lagioia =

Italian writer (born 1973)

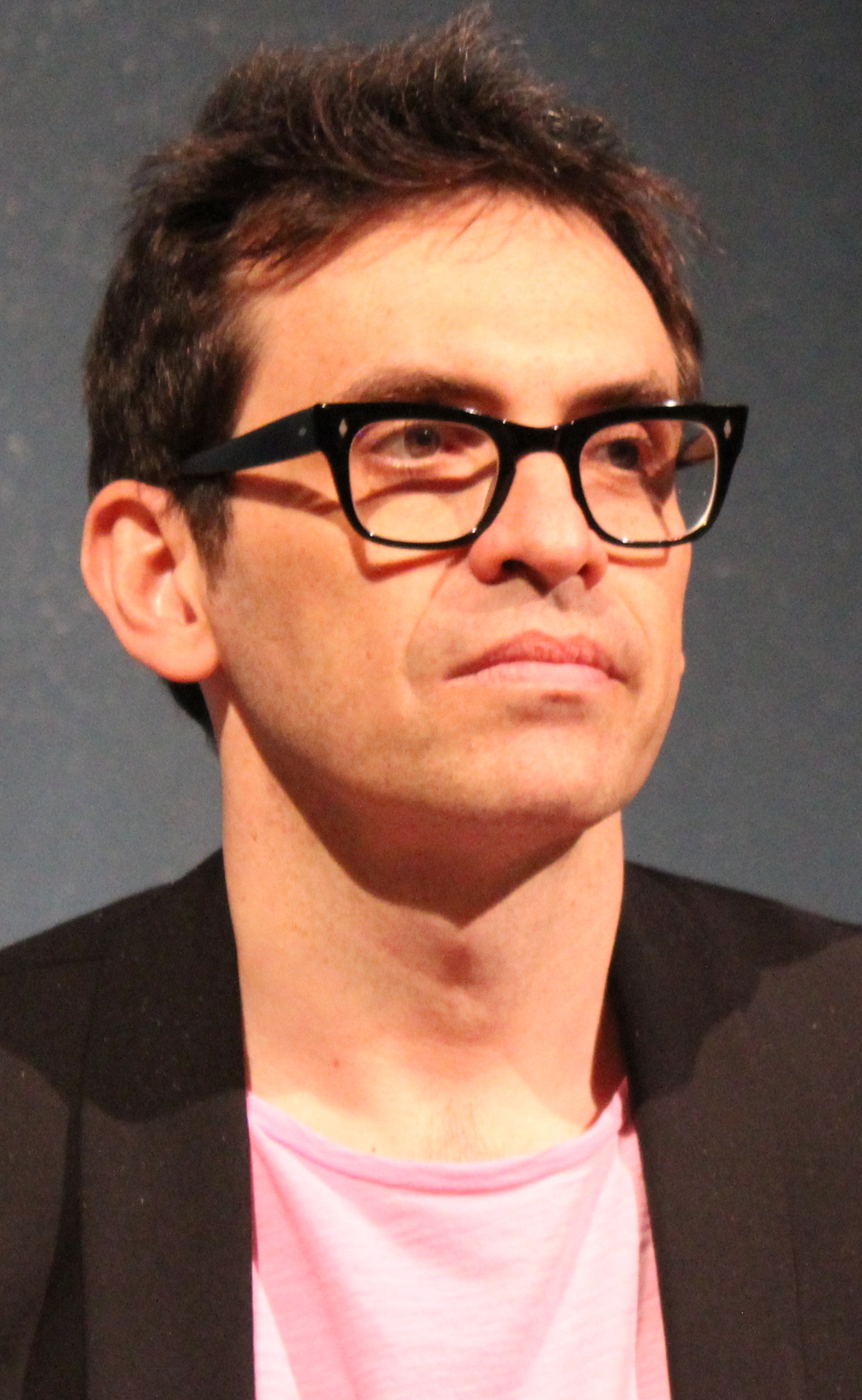
- Born: April 18, 1973 (age 53); Bari, Italy
- Occupation: Writer

Nicola Lagioia (born 18 April 1973) is an Italian writer.

Born in Bari, Lagioia debuted as a novelist in 2001 with Tre sistemi per sbarazzarsi di Tolstoj (senza risparmiare se stessi). With his novel Riportando tutto a casa he won several awards, including the 2010 Viareggio Prize. In 2013 and in 2014, he was among the film selectors of the Venice International Film Festival. In 2015, he won the Strega Prize with the novel La ferocia (a.k.a. "The ferocity").

In 2025, his novel The City of the Living was longlisted for the International Dublin Literary Award. In 2026, the novel was adapted into a film with the same title directed by Edoardo Gabbriellini.
