= The Traitor (2019 film) =

2019 film by Marco Bellocchio

- Theatrical release poster
- Italian: Il traditore
- Directed by: Marco Bellocchio
- Screenplay by: Marco Bellocchio; Valia Santella; Ludovica Rampoldi; Francesco Piccolo; Francesco La Licata (Note: Credited separately with "screenplay collaboration")
- Story by: Marco Bellocchio
- Produced by: Beppe Caschetto
- Starring: Pierfrancesco Favino; Maria Fernanda Cândido; Fabrizio Ferracane; Fausto Russo Alesi; Luigi Lo Cascio
- Cinematography: Vladan Radovic
- Edited by: Francesca Calvelli
- Music by: Nicola Piovani
- Production companies: Rai Cinema; IBC Movie; Kavac Film; Gullane; Match Factory Productions; Ad Vitam Production; Film- und Medienstiftung NRW; Arte France Cinéma; ZDF/Arte; Canal Brasil; Telecine; Canal+; Ciné+; The Match Factory
- Distributed by: 01 Distribution (Italy); Ad Vitam Distribution (France); Pandora Film (Germany); Sony Pictures Classics (Brazil)
- Release dates: 23 May 2019 (Cannes); 23 May 2019 (Italy); 30 October 2019 (France)
- Running time: 153 minutes
- Countries: Italy; France; Brazil; Germany
- Languages: Italian; Sicilian; Portuguese
- Box office: $8.9 million

The Traitor (Italian: Il traditore) is a 2019 internationally co-produced biographical crime drama film co-written and directed by Marco Bellocchio, about the life of Tommaso Buscetta, the first Sicilian Mafia boss who was treated by some as pentito. Pierfrancesco Favino stars as Buscetta, alongside Maria Fernanda Cândido, Fabrizio Ferracane, Fausto Russo Alesi and Luigi Lo Cascio.

The Traitor premiered in competition at the 2019 Cannes Film Festival, and was released theatrically in 23 May by 01 Distribution, and on 30 October in France by Ad Vitam Distribution. It received positive reviews from critics and auditory. Although selected as the Italian entry for the Best Foreign Language Film at the 92nd Academy Awards, it was not nominated.

== Plot ==
In the 1980s, the period of maximum power of the mafia clans in Italy, the Cosa Nostra of Palermo and Corleonesi factions (headed by Totò Riina), competing for the drug market, maintain a facade of friendship and collaboration. Tommaso Buscetta (Pierfrancesco Favino), affiliated with Cosa Nostra and known as the "boss of two worlds", senses the imminent war between families and decides to move to Brazil, where he can follow his business in peace under the name of Roberto Felici. As he predicted, after his departure tensions begin and the first victims of the feud fall, including two of his sons and his brother. But Buscetta is captured and tortured by the Brazilian police. The mafioso understands that he is facing certain death when his extradition to Italy is agreed. Unexpectedly, judge Giovanni Falcone (Fausto Russo Alesi) offers him a way out: to collaborate with the police and the judiciary, enjoying the protection of the state. Buscetta, who for some time no longer recognizes himself in the violent and unscrupulous actions of the Cosa Nostra and linked to an idea of the mafia that protects poor people, decides to accept, also to take revenge for the reprisals and persecutions against him and his family. He thus becomes the first justice collaborator in Italian history, making possible the institution in 1986 of the Maxi-Trial with 475 defendants in the bunker-court of Palermo, where his testimonies - and those of Totuccio Contorno (Luigi Lo Cascio) - lead to the condemnation and arrest of numerous members of the mafia, put to the test for the first time and in the spotlight of the state and public opinion. Organized crime will respond with the assassination of Judge Falcone in 1992 in the attack known as the "Capaci massacre", where in addition to the magistrate, his wife Francesca Morvillo and three escort agents lost their lives. Buscetta, under protection in the United States, will return to Italy to honor the pact with Falcone and testify in the so-called "trial of the century", which involved Giulio Andreotti, the main exponent of the Christian Democrats and a great protagonist of Italian politics in the second half of the 1900s, and numerous other politicians, thus bringing to light the strong ties between the state and the Mafia.

== Cast ==
- Pierfrancesco Favino as Tommaso Buscetta
  - Giovanni Crozza as young Tommaso Buscetta
- Maria Fernanda Cândido as Maria Cristina de Almeida Guimarães, Buscetta's third wife
- Fabrizio Ferracane as Pippo Calò
- Fausto Russo Alesi as Judge Giovanni Falcone
- Luigi Lo Cascio as Salvatore 'Totuccio' Contorno
- Nicola Calì as Totò Riina
- Giovanni Calcagno as Gaetano Badalamenti
- Bruno Cariello as Alfonso Giordano
- Alberto Storti as Franco Coppi, Giulio Andreotti's defense attorney
- Vincenzo Pirrotta as Luciano Liggio
- Goffredo Maria Bruno as Stefano Bontate
- Gabriele Cicirello as Benedetto Buscetta, Buscetta's oldest son
- Paride Cicirello as Antonio Buscetta, Buscetta's second son
- Alessio Praticò as Giuseppe 'Scarpuzzedda' Greco
- Pier Giorgio Bellocchio as Cesare, head of Falcone's security detail
- Rosario Palazzolo as Giovanni De Gennaro
- Antonio Orlando as Michele
- Ada Nisticò as Alessandra Buscetta
- Federica Butera as Silvana Buscetta
- Ludovico Caldarera as Salvatore Cancemi
- Nunzia Lo Presti as Antonietta Bagarella, Riina's wife
- Matteo Contino as Salvatore Inzerillo
- Alberto Gottuso as Giuseppe Inzerillo, Inzerillo's son
- Tatu La Vecchia as Brother Giacinto
- Massimiliano Ubaldi as Giovanni Brusca
- Filippo Parisi as Giovanni
- Pippo Di Marca as Giulio Andreotti
- Nino Porzio: Tecnico Regia di Studio RAI

== Release ==
The Traitor was released theatrically in Italy on 23 May 2019 by 01 Distribution, and in France on 30 October 2019.

Sony Pictures Classics took the film for North and Latin America, Scandinavia, Australia and New Zealand; it was released in select theaters in the United States on 31 January 2020, and in Canada on 7 February 2020. It was later released on DVD/Blu-ray and video on demand on 12 May 2020.

== Reception ==
=== Box office ===
The Traitor earned $8.9 million worldwide at the box office.

=== Critical response ===
On review aggregator website Rotten Tomatoes, the film holds an approval rating of 85% based on 105 reviews, and an average rating of 7.2/10. The website's critical consensus reads: "While it doesn't probe particularly far below the surface of its central character, The Traitor tells its fact-based story with enough energy to entertain." Metacritic, which uses a weighted average, assigned the film a score of 64 out of 100, based on 22 critics, indicating "generally favorable reviews".

=== Awards and nominations ===
It was selected to compete for the Palme d'Or at the 2019 Cannes Film Festival. It was selected as the Italian entry for the Best International Feature Film at the 92nd Academy Awards, but was not nominated. The film received 4 nominations to the 32nd European Film Awards, including Best Film, Best Director, Best Screenwriter, Best Actor. It also won seven awards (out of 11 nomination) at the Nastro d'Argento: Best Film, Best Director, Best Screenplay, Best Editing, Best Score, Best Actor (Pierfrancesco Favino) and Best Supporting Actor (Luigi Lo Cascio and Fabrizio Ferracane). It won six awards at the David di Donatello awards, including best film, director and lead actor.

== See also ==
- List of submissions to the 92nd Academy Awards for Best International Feature Film
- List of Italian submissions for the Academy Award for Best International Feature Film
