= The Echo Chamber (film) =

2026 drama film by Andrea Pallaoro

- Italian theatrical release poster
- Directed by: Andrea Pallaoro
- Written by: Bernardo Bertolucci; Ilaria Bernardini; Ludovica Rampoldi
- Produced by: Nicola Giuliano; Francesca Cima; Carlotta Calori; Viola Prestieri
- Starring: Luca Marinelli; Alicia Vikander; Susan Sarandon
- Cinematography: Diego García
- Edited by: Paola Freddi
- Music by: Clément Ducol
- Production companies: Rai Cinema; Indigo Film; Versus Production
- Distributed by: 01 Distribution (Italy)
- Release dates: 6 September 2026 (Venice); 10 September 2026 (Italy)
- Running time: 123 minutes
- Countries: Italy; Belgium
- Language: English

The Echo Chamber is a 2026 romantic drama film directed by Andrea Pallaoro, written by Bernardo Bertolucci (in his final screenplay before his death in 2018), Ilaria Bernardini and Ludovica Rampoldi. A co-production of Italy and Belgium, it stars Luca Marinelli, Alicia Vikander, and Susan Sarandon.

The film had its world premiere in the main competition of the 83rd Venice International Film Festival on 6 September 2026, where it competed for the Golden Lion. It will be theatrically released in Italy by 01 Distribution on 10 September.

== Cast ==
- Luca Marinelli as Leo
- Alicia Vikander as Anne
- Susan Sarandon as Ava

== Production ==
The film is produced by Nicola Giuliano, Francesca Cima, Carlotta Calori and Viola Prestieri for Indigo Film and Rai Cinema, and co-produced by Jacques-Henri Bronckart and Tatjana Kozar for Versus Production. It is supported by the Ministero della Cultura – Fund for the Development of Investments in Film and Audiovisual Works, Regione Lazio's Lazio Cinema International Avviso Pubblico (PR FESR 2021-2027), Creative Europe MEDIA, Paradise City Sales, Be TV, Proximus and O'Brother Distribution.

Bernardo Bertolucci final screenplay, following his death in 2018, it was co-written with Ilaria Bernardini and Ludovica Rampoldi, and offered to Pallaoro by Italian producer Nicola Giuliano in 2024. Filming took place in late 2025.

Pallaoro and the cast at the 83rd Venice International Film Festival

== Release ==
The film had its world premiere in the main competition of the 83rd Venice International Film Festival on 6 September 2026, where it competed for the Golden Lion. It will be theatrically released in Italy by 01 Distribution on 10 September.

== Reception ==
On review aggregator Rotten Tomatoes, the film holds an approval rating of 62% based on 13 reviews, with an average rating of 5.7/10. Metacritic, which uses a weighted average, assigned the film a score of 63 out of 100, based on 9 critics, indicating "generally favorable" reviews.

Sheri Linden from the Hollywood Reporter praised the film, describing it as "the kind of movie you either resist or surrender to", finding the latter approach more rewarding, as "the characters and their relationships grow more absorbing as the story proceeds, and late-arriving twists that might have been mawkish in other hands prove haunting and affecting." Variety's critic Jessica Kiang called the film "certainly beautiful", with an "exquisite production design", and "directed with great sensitivity and restraint", but criticized the "highly unnecessary eleventh-hour swerve into melodrama".

IndieWire's critic Ryan Lattanzio wrote "Pallaoro’s piercingly moving study of addiction spirals into operatic exaggeration and blazing unsubtlety, but that shift never feels dishonest or betraying of the story he’s trying to tell".
