= Francesco Casetti =

Italian scholar

Francesco Casetti (born April 2, 1947) is an Italian naturalized US citizen film and television theorist. He is Sterling Professor of Humanities and Film and Media Studies at Yale University. He has been described as "the best analyst of cinematographic enunciation".

== Biography ==
In 1970 Casetti earned an MA at the Catholic University of Milan, where in 1974 he also received an advanced degree in film and communication studies. His positions include assistant professor at the University of Genova (1974–1980), associate professor at Catholic University of Milan (1984–1994), full professor at the University of Trieste (1994–1998) and then at Catholic University of Milan, where he was the chair of the department of communication and performing arts.

He taught as an associate professor at University of Paris III: Sorbonne Nouvelle (1977) and as visiting professor at the University of Iowa (1988, 1991 and 1998) and at Harvard University. In 2000 he was awarded the chair of Italian Culture for a distinguished scholar at the University of California, Berkeley (2000). He had fellowships at the University of Otago (summer 2011), at the Bauhaus University, Weimar (summer 2012), and at the Free University of Berlin (fall 2019 and spring 2023).

He is a member of the advisory board of the journals Necsus, Comunicazioni Sociali. Journal of Media, Performing Arts and Cultural Studies, Cinéma & Cie. Film and Media Studies Journal and Fata Morgana. Quadrimestrale di cinema e visioni.

Casetti was on the boards of the research institutions Gemelli-Musatti (Milan), the International Center for Family Studies, and the Mattei Foundation. He was part of the board of the Centro Sperimentale di Cinematografia in Rome, the Istituto Luce in Rome, the Triennale in Milan and the MaxMuseo in Lugano.

He is a full member of the Accademia degli Agiati, Rovereto, a corresponding member of the Academy of Sciences (Bologna), and a foreign member of the Academy of Moral and Political Sciences (Naples).

He and Jane Gaines of Columbia University set up a permanent seminar on Histories of Film Theories, an international network of film scholars aimed at an exploration of the field of film and media theories.

In 2026 he has been invited to be part of the jury in the main competition of the 83rd Venice International Film Festival.

== Research ==
Casetti's research concerns cinema and visual media: their audience, their relationship with the cultural forms of modernity and their impact on space. His early works are influenced by the semiotics of cinema, and mostly concern film analysis, with essays on Visconti's La terra trema and Il gattopardo, De Sica's Sciuscià, and a book on Bernardo Bertolucci (1975); he has also written about the television series (Un'altra volta ancora, 1984). These works led to a textbook on the subject, Analisi del film (1990), followed by Analisi della televisione (1998), both written with Federico di Chio.

In the 1990s, after a study on the implied spectator in film (Inside the Gaze, 1999) and in television (Tra me e te. Strategie di convolgimento dello spettatore nei programmi della neotelevisione, 1988), he combined analyses of media with ethnographic research into audiences, editing a collection on media consumption in 32 Italian families (L'ospite fisso, 1995), and defining the concepts of "communicative situation" and "communicative pact" (Communicative Negotiation in Cinema and Television, 2002).

In the 2000s and 2010s Casetti explored the role of cinema in the context of modernity and the decline of cinema in the electronic age in two books. Eye of the Century. Film, Experience, Modernity (2008) suggests that cinema was crucial in negotiating between the opposite trends of modernism, like the focus on language and the desire of immediacy, or the fascination for machines and the preservation of humans. The Lumière Galaxy: Seven Key words for the Cinema to Come (2015) interprets film’s transformations as a process of 'relocation' of media in new physical and technological spaces. His last book, Screeneng Fears. On Protective Media (2023) analyses the way media shelter us from the alleged threats from our environment and in this way become part of governmental practices. Casetti has also written on film theories (Theories of Cinema, 1945-1995, 1999, and more recently he co-edited Early Film Theories in Italy. 1896-1922, 2017).

== Awards ==
Two of Casetti's books has been awarded with the "Limina Award" for best book on film of the year: the original Italian edition of The Lumière Galaxy: Seven Key words for the Cinema to Come in 2006, and Screening Fears: On Protective Media in 2024.

== Bibliography ==
- Casetti, Francesco (2023). Screening Fears. On Protective Media. New York: Zone Books
- Casetti, Francesco (2015). The Lumière Galaxy: Seven Key words for the Cinema to Come. New York: Columbia University Press.
- Casetti, Francesco (2008). Eye of the Century. Film, Experience, Modernity. New York: Columbia University Press.
- Casetti, Francesco (2002). Communicative Negotiation in Cinema and Television. Milan: Vita e Pensiero.
- Casetti, Francesco (1999). Theories of Cinema, 1945-1990. Austin: University of Texas Press.
- Casetti, Francesco (ed.) (1995). L'ospite fisso. Televisione e mass media nelle famiglie italiane. Milan: San Paolo.
- Casetti, Francesco (ed.) (1988). Tra me e te. Strategie di coinvolgimento dello spettatore nella neotelevisione. Rome: Eri-VQPT.
- Casetti, Francesco (1986). Dentro lo Sguardo. Il Film e il suo Spettatore. Milan: Bompiani.
