= Union Town (film) =

2026 American documentary film

- Directed by: Barbara Kopple
- Produced by: Hannes Hosp; Barbara Kopple; Peter Palandjian
- Cinematography: Timothy Grucza; Hannes Hosp; Rachel Beth Anderson
- Edited by: Francisco Bello; Hannes Hosp; Deborah Peretz
- Music by: Jongnic Bontemps
- Production company: Cabin Creek Films
- Release date: September 9, 2026 (Venice)
- Running time: 106 minutes
- Country: United States
- Language: English

Union Town is a 2026 American documentary film directed and produced by Barbara Kopple. It follows delivery workers as they take on corporations, and struggle to form unions.

The film had its world premiere out of competition of the 83rd Venice International Film Festival on September 9, 2026.

== Premise ==
The film follows delivery workers such as UPS and Amazon drivers, as they take on corporations.

== Production ==
In March 2026, Barbara Kopple revealed she was in production on a documentary revolving around delivery workers.

== Release ==
It had its world premiere Out of Competition at the 83rd Venice International Film Festival on September 9, 2026. It will also screen at the 2026 Toronto International Film Festival.
