= Ann Sirot and Raphaël Balboni =

Filmmakers

Sirot and Balboni at the 83rd Venice International Film Festival

Ann Sirot and Raphaël Balboni are filmmakers based in Brussels, Belgium. They have worked as a writing and directing team for their entire professional film careers.

== Career ==
Ann Sirot (born in Brussels, Belgium) and Raphaël Balboni (born in Auxon, France) met in Brussels and started working together in 2007. After developing an interest in filmmaking, the couple directed a number of short films, gaining critical attention in the independent festival circuit.

Sirot and Balboni made their full-length debut in 2020 with Madly in Life (Une vie démente), a comedy-drama film that follows an aging woman (Jo Deseure) dealing with her progressing dementia with the help of her son (Jean Le Peltier). The film had its world premiere as the opening film at the Namur Film Festival on 2 October 2020 and was theatrically released in Belgium on 4 November 2020. Upon release, the film was acclaimed by critics, who lauded the cast performances as well as the production values and the sensitive portrayal of its subject matter.

At the 11th Magritte Awards, Madly in Life received a record-tying twelve nominations and won seven awards, including Best Film and Best Screenplay for Sirot and Balboni. Their film The Experience of Love (Le Syndrome des amours passées) premiered at the 76th Cannes Film Festival during the Critics' Week on 20 May 2023. In 2026, they won the Orizzonti competition of the 83rd Venice International Film Festival with Diane in the Loop.
