= Back to Buenos Aires =

2026 historical-thriller film by Marco Bechis

- Italian theatrical release poster
- Italian: Ritorno a Buenos Aires
- Directed by: Marco Bechis
- Written by: Vijaya Bechis Boll; Marco Bechis
- Produced by: Cibele Amaral; Marco Bechis; Patrick de Jongh; Alfredo Federico; Domenico Procacci; André Ristum
- Starring: Adriano Giannini; Ana Celentano
- Cinematography: Fabrizio La Palombara
- Edited by: Jacopo Quadri; Nicolò Tettamanti
- Music by: Guglielmo Diana
- Production companies: Fandango; 39Films; Karta Film; 34 Filmes; Rai Cinema
- Distributed by: Fandango
- Release dates: 11 September 2026 (Venice); 17 September 2026 (Italy)
- Running time: 105 minutes
- Countries: Italy; Brazil
- Languages: Italian; Spanish; English

Back to Buenos Aires (Italian: Ritorno a Buenos Aires) is a 2026 historical-thriller film directed by Marco Bechis, co-written with Vijaya Bechis Boll. A co-production between Italy and Brazil, it stars Adriano Giannini as Mariano Guerra, an Argentinian-Italian man testifying against former officers in Argentina's military dictatorship.

The film had its world premiere at the main competition of the 83rd Venice International Film Festival on 11 September 2026, where it competed for the Golden Lion. It will be theatrically released in Italy by Fandango in September 17.

== Synopsis ==
In 2008, Italian doctor Mariano Guerra returns to Buenos Aires after 33 years to testify against the former officers who kidnapped and tortured him during Argentina's military dictatorship.

== Cast ==
- Adriano Giannini as Mariano Guerra
- Ana Celentano as Amalia Mendez
- Verónica Gerez as Evelyn
- Olivia Nuss as Muñeca
- Adrián Fondari as Doctor K
- Paula Cohen as Gudice Desideria Losada
- Marcelo Chaparro as Abogado Enrique Caseros
- Vijaya Bechis Boll

== Production ==
=== Development ===
The film was produced by Fandango, 39Films, Karta Film, and 34 Filmes in co-production with Rai Cinema and with financial support from the Italian Ministry of Culture cinema fund, Piemonte Film TV fund, the Film Commission Torino Piemonte, and the Fondo Settoriale Dell’audiovisivo.

=== Filming ===
Principal photography took place in Porto Alegre, Brazil (standing for Buenos Aires), then moved to Turin, between January and February 2026. Locations included the high-security courtroom at the Vallette prison and various outdoor settings in the San Salvario district.

== Release ==
Back to Buenos Aires premiered on 11 September 2026, in competition for the Golden Lion at the 83rd Venice International Film Festival. The film will receive a theatrical release by the Italian distribution company Fandango on September 17.

== Reception ==
Matthew Turner from Next Best Picture gave to the film a rating of 8 out of 10.

The Film Verdict's Deborah oung wrote: "'Back to Buenos Aires' picks up the shattered pieces of the survivors in an equally dark and intense work".

International Cinephile Society called it "A harrowing film about coming to terms with the feelings of guilt felt by those who survive." and awarded the film with four star out of five.
