= It Will Happen Tonight =

2026 drama film

- Italian: Succederà questa notte
- Directed by: Nanni Moretti
- Screenplay by: Francesca Marciano; Nanni Moretti; Federica Pontremoli; Valia Santella
- Based on: Hungry Heart by Eshkol Nevo
- Produced by: Xabier Berzosa; Philippe Godeau; Nanni Moretti; Ander Sagardoy
- Starring: Louis Garrel; Jasmine Trinca; Angela Finocchiaro; Elena Lietti; Antonio De Matteo
- Cinematography: Francesco Di Giacomo
- Edited by: Clelio Benevento
- Production companies: BTeam Prods; Fandango; IWHT Film AIE; Irusoin; Pan Cinema; Rai Cinema; Sacher Film
- Distributed by: 01 Distribution (Italy); Pan-Européenne (France); BTeam Pictures (Spain)
- Release dates: 5 September 2026 (Venice); 25 December 2026 (Spain)
- Running time: 103 minutes
- Countries: Italy; France; Spain
- Language: Italian

It Will Happen Tonight (Italian: Succederà questa notte) is a 2026 drama film directed by Nanni Moretti, co-written with Federica Pontremoli and Valia Santella, and loosely based on the short story collection Hungry Heart by Eshkol Nevo. It stars Louis Garrel, Jasmine Trinca, Angela Finocchiaro, Elena Lietti and Antonio De Matteo.

The film had its world premiere in the main competition of the 83rd Venice International Film Festival on 5 September 2026, where it competed for the Golden Lion.

== Cast ==
- Louis Garrel as Matteo
- Jasmine Trinca as Greta
- Angela Finocchiaro
- Elena Lietti
- Antonio De Matteo
- Andrea Lattanzi
- Alessandro Scafati as Francis Scott Fitzgerald
- Pietro Ragusa
- Hippolyte Girardot
- Paolo Sassanelli

== Production ==
=== Development ===
It's the first feature film directed by Moretti in which he will not be a part of the main cast. The filmmaker suffered a heart attack few months before the shooting.

The screenplay is loosely based on the short story collection Hungry Heart by Israeli writer Eshkol Nevo. Moretti had previously adapted another work by Nevo in Three Floors (2021).

=== Filming ===
Principal photography began on 1 September 2025, shooting on location in Rome and Turin in Italy, and San Sebastian in Spain.

The project is being produced by Moretti’s Sacher Film and Fandango in collaboration with Rai Cinema.

== Release ==
Like all Moretti's films since Caro diario (1993), the film was expected to have its world premiere at the main competition of the 2026 Cannes Film Festival, but the film was still in post-production by early 2026 due to Moretti's poor health.

The film had its world premiere in the main competition of the 83rd Venice International Film Festival on 5 September 2026, where it will compete for the Golden Lion. It was also programmed in the 'Perlak' sidebar section of the 74th San Sebastián International Film Festival. It will be distributed in Italy by 01 Distribution and in Spain by BTeam Pictures. The latter programmed a 25 December 2026 theatrical release date.

== See also ==
- List of Spanish films of 2026
