= Jon Kilik =

American film producer

Jon Kilik (born December 26, 1956) is an American film producer. He has worked with a number of filmmakers including Spike Lee, Julian Schnabel, Gary Ross, Alejandro González Iñárritu, Jim Jarmusch, Robert Altman and Oliver Stone.

He was nominated for the Academy Award for Best Picture for producing the film Babel (2006). He was also nominated for the BAFTA Award for Best Film for producing Babel. He was also nominated twice for the BAFTA Award for Best Film Not in the English Language for producing the films The Diving Bell and the Butterfly (2007) and Biutiful (2010). He was also nominated thrice for the Producers Guild of America Award for Best Theatrical Motion Picture for producing the films Babel (2006), The Diving Bell and the Butterfly (2007) and Foxcatcher (2014). Kilik is a co-recipient of the Special Distinction Award for producing Foxcatcher (2014) at the 30th Independent Spirit Awards. Kilik was also nominated twice for the Independent Spirit Award for Best Film for producing Before Night Falls (2000) and The Diving Bell and the Butterfly (2007).

Kilik was born in Newark, New Jersey, and grew up in Millburn. He graduated from Millburn High School in 1974. He also attended and graduated from the University of Vermont in the 1970s.

== Filmography ==
Assistant Director

- Arizona Junior (1986)

Producer

- The Beat (1988)
- Fathers & Sons (1992)
- Malcolm X (1992) (Co-producer)
- A Bronx Tale (1993)
- Prêt-à-Porter (1994) (Co-producer)
- Clockers (1995)
- Dead Man Walking (1995)
- Basquiat (1996)
- He Got Game (1988)
- Pleasantville (1998)
- Cradle Will Rock (1999)
- Summer of Sam (1999)
- Before Night Falls (2000)
- Pollock (2000)
- Bamboozled (2000)
- Skins (2002)
- 25th Hour (2002)
- Alexander (2004)
- Broken Flowers (2005)
- Babel (2006)
- The Diving Bell and the Butterfly (2007)
- Lou Reed's Berlin (2007) (Documentary)
- Biutiful (2010)
- Miral (2010)
- The Hunger Games (2012)
- The Hunger Games: Catching Fire (2013)
- Foxcatcher (2014)
- The Hunger Games: Mockingjay – Part 1 (2014)
- The Hunger Games: Mockingjay – Part 2 (2015)
- Free State of Jones (2015)
- Thank You for Your Service (2017)
- At Eternity's Gate (2018)
- Da 5 Bloods (2020)
- Flag Day (2021)
- Ezra (2023)
- In the Hand of Dante (2025)

Executive producer

- Bum Rap (1988)
- Crooklyn (1994)
- Saints and Sinners (1994)
- Girl 6 (1996)
- The Party's Over (2003) (Documentary)
- Inside Man (2006)
- Miracle at St. Anna (2008)
- W. (2008) (Co-executive producer)
- The Limits of Control (2009)
- Mike Tyson: Undisputed Truth (2013) (TV special)
- Chi-Raq (2015)
- Gimme Danger (2016) (Documentary)
- The Voice of Hind Rajab (2025)
- Falling House (2026)

Line producer

- Do the Right Thing (1989)
- Mo' Better Blues (1990)
- Jungle Fever (1991)
