= Diane in the Loop =

2026 film by Ann Sirot and Raphaël Balboni

- French: Un détour par Diane
- Directed by: Ann Sirot; Raphaël Balboni
- Written by: Ann Sirot; Raphaël Balboni
- Produced by: Delphine Tomson; Jean-Pierre Dardenne; Luc Dardenne; Alice Bloch
- Starring: Ninon Borsei; Sandrine Blancke
- Cinematography: Fiona Braillon
- Edited by: Sophie Vercruysse; Raphaël Balboni
- Music by: Julie Roué
- Production companies: Les Films du Fleuve; Marianne Productions
- Release date: 6 September 2026 (Venice)
- Running time: 92 minutes
- Countries: Belgium; France
- Language: French

Diane in the Loop (French: Un détour par Diane) is a 2026 drama film written and directed by Ann Sirot and Raphaël Balboni. A co-production of Belgium and France, it stars Ninon Borsei as the titular role and Sandrine Blancke as her mother.

The film had its world premiere in the Orizzonti section of the 83rd Venice International Film Festival on 6 September 2026, where it won the section's main prize.

== Premise ==
Diane discovers that her mother was raped in the past and seeks revenge for what happened to her.

== Cast ==
- Ninon Borsei as Diane
- Sandrine Blancke as Mother
- Lucas Meister
- Peter Van Den Begin
- Naidra Ayadi

== Production ==
In November 2024, it was reported that the project received production grant from the Wallonia-Brussels Film and Audiovisual Centre. In April 2025, it received production grant from the Centre national du cinéma et de l'image animée. In the same month, it also received a €150,000 production grant from the Eurimages.

Principal photography took place in October 2025.

== Release ==
Diane in the Loop had its world premiere competing in the Orizzonti section of the 83rd Venice International Film Festival on 6 September 2026. It won the section's main prize. The film will be released in French theatres on 10 February 2027.

== Accolades ==
Award / Film Festival	Date of ceremony	Category	Recipient(s)	Result	Ref.
Venice Film Festival	12 September 2026	Orizzonti Award for Best Film	Ann Sirot and Raphaël Balboni	Won	
