= A Day in the Life of Jo: Chapter Phaedra =

2026 drama film by Jacqueline Lentzou

- International teaser poster
- Greek: Mia mera sti zoi tis tzo: kefalaio Faidra
- Directed by: Jacqueline Lentzou
- Screenplay by: Jacqueline Lentzou
- Produced by: Annabelle Aronis; Ioanna Bolomyti; Arda Çiltepe; Steffen Goldkamp; Andrea Queralt; Jacqueline Lentzou
- Starring: Evita Andriopoulou; Eleni Vergeti; Anastasia Gouliamou; Ektoras Lygizos
- Cinematography: Grimm Vandekerckhove
- Edited by: Jacqueline Lentzou; Gabriel Gonzalez; Nikos Vavouris
- Music by: Colin Stetson
- Production companies: Avion Films; Atalante Productions; Kelek Film; 4 à 4 Productions
- Distributed by: Lucky Number
- Release date: 8 September 2026 (Venice)
- Running time: 88 minutes
- Countries: Greece; Germany; France
- Language: Greek

A Day in the Life of Jo: Chapter Phaedra (Greek: Mia mera sti zoi tis tzo: kefalaio Faidra) is a 2026 coming-of-age drama film written and directed by Jacqueline Lentzou. A co-production of Greece, Germany, and France, it stars Evita Andriopoulou, Eleni Vergeti, and Anastasia Gouliamou.

The film had its world premiere in the Orizzonti section of the 83rd Venice International Film Festival on 8 September 2026, where it won the section's Best Director award.

== Synopsis ==
Fifteen-year-old Jo is a lonely and troubled girl who often dreams about her own death. During the day, she notices strange signs that seem connected to her dreams, but she does not understand what they mean. Her ordinary school life feels dull. She misses the school bus, gets little help from her mother, and spends the day dealing with an uninteresting class, a boyfriend who is still awkward at kissing, and meaningless gossip. Everything changes during a singing lesson when Phaedra, a new girl with a beautiful and almost magical voice, deeply moves Jo to tears. Later, while wandering through the library, Jo unexpectedly meets Phaedra again. After sharing a song and revealing personal secrets, the two girls form what may be Jo's first genuine friendship.

They shyly arrange to meet that night. As the sun sets in a strangely beautiful and mysterious way, Jo looks forward to their meeting. But an unexpected twist of fate changes everything, and Jo never gets the chance to keep their date.

== Cast ==
Cast and Crew of the film at the 83rd Venice International Film Festival

- Evita Andriopoulou
- Eleni Vergeti
- Anastasia Gouliamou
- Ektoras Lygizos

== Production ==
Jacqueline Lentzou was a finalist in the Rolex Mentor and Protégé Arts Initiative (2022–2024) and received the Onassis Foundation New York Fellowship and Nipkow Fellowship in 2022.

In April 2023, the project was selected in Cine por Hacer at the sixth edition of Mercado del Cine Casi Hecho, a market dedicated to almost-finished films, which runs with the Las Palmas de Gran Canaria International Film Festival in Las Palmas, Canary Islands in Spain.

In August 2024, the screenplay was selected for TorinoFilmLab’s FeatureLab 2024, where it won the ARRI Award for Cinematic Vision, before joining the Cannes Next Step – Volume II 2024 programme in September.

In 2025, it was also selected for Les Arcs Film Festival's Work in Progress section, receiving Special Mention in the 22D Music Award, and earlier this year participated in First Cut Lab 2026.

== Release ==
A Day in the Life of Jo: Chapter Phaedra had its world premiere in the Orizzonti section of the 83rd Venice International Film Festival on 8 September 2026. The film had its North American Premiere in 'Currents' section of the 2026 New York Film Festival on 26 September. It was also screened at the Reykjavik International Film Festival for Icelandic Premiere on 26 September.

It was also selected in the Flash Forward section of the 31st Busan International Film Festival, where it was screened on 10 October. It was also presented in the 'International Panorama' section of the 2026 Festival du nouveau cinéma on 13 October, and in the 'Dare' section of the 2026 BFI London Film Festival on 17 October 2026. On 23 October, it will meet in the 'Meeting Point' section of the 71st Valladolid International Film Festival with the audience. Same day it was screened in Departures section at the 62nd Chicago International Film Festival on 23 October 2026, and for Japanese Premiere on 28 October 2026 in the Youth section of the 39th Tokyo International Film Festival. On 30 October it was screened at the 49th Denver Film Festival.

Paris-based sales company Lucky Number acquired the international sales rights to the film before its world premiere in Venice.

== Reception ==
=== Critical response ===
Reviewing at Venice International Film Festival for Cineuropa, David Katz praised the film as "one of the more visually and formally accomplished films in the 2026 Venice Orizzonti selection." He highlighted Jacqueline Lentzou's striking use of blue-filtered imagery, hyperreal colours, long tracking shots, which give the coming-of-age story an unusually "dream" like quality. He also praised the film's exploration of Jo's emerging queer desire and the way Colin Stetson's atmospheric score contributes to its sense of transcendence. Concludingly, Katz found that the director's vision transforms the story of sudden death into a meditation on "potential eternity" and the afterlife.

=== Accolades ===
The film was shortlisted for a nomination at the 39th European Film Awards in the Feature Film category.

Award	Date of ceremony	Category	Recipient(s)	Result	Ref.
Venice Film Festival	12 September 2026	Orizzonti Award for Best Film	A Day in the Life of Jo: Chapter Phaedra	Nominated	
Venice Film Festival	12 September 2026	Edipo Re Award – Official Jury	A Day in the Life of Jo: Chapter Phaedra	Won	
Venice Film Festival	12 September 2026	Orizzonti Award for Best Director	Jacqueline Lentzou	Won	
Thessaloniki International Film Festival	15 November 2026	Golden Alexander	A Day in the Life of Jo: Chapter Phaedra	Won	
