= Fausto Russo Alesi =

Italian actor (born 1973)

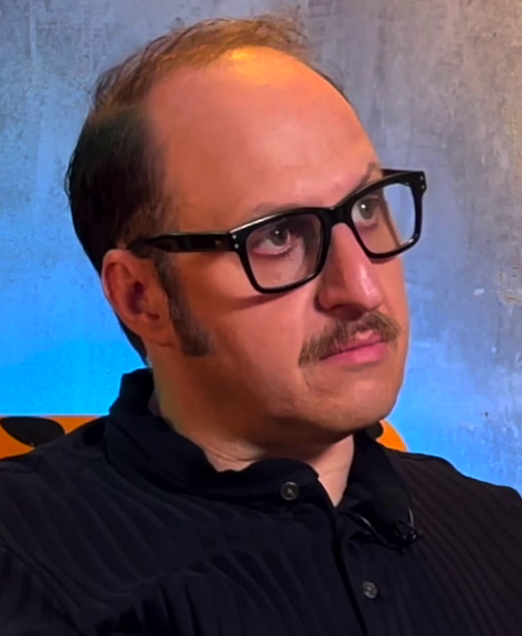
- Born: 13 October 1973 (age 52); Palermo, Italy
- Occupation: Actor
- Years active: 2002–present

Fausto Russo Alesi (born 13 October 1973) is an Italian actor and theatre director.

== Biography ==
Born in Palermo, Russo Alesi moved to Milan to study acting, graduating in 1996 from the Paolo Grassi Drama School. He worked for several years at the Piccolo Teatro in Milan, where he was directed by Luca Ronconi in various works.

Parallel to his stage activity, he takes his first steps in the world of cinema: he is noticed by Marco Bellocchio, who engages him for his films Vincere, Blood of My Blood, Sweet Dreams, The Traitor, Exterior Night and Kidnapped.

== Selected filmography ==
=== Film ===
Key
†	Denotes films that have not yet been released

Year	Title	Role	Notes
2000	Bread and Tulips	Car driver	
2004	Agata and the Storm	TV show guest	
2004	Miracle in Palermo!	Angelo	
2006	Secret Journey	Car driver	
2009	Vincere	Riccardo Paicher	
2009	The Double Hour	Bruno	
2010	La Passione	Pippo	
2012	Garibaldi's Lovers	Real estate agent	
2012	Piazza Fontana: The Italian Conspiracy	Guido Giannettini	
2015	Blood of My Blood	Cacciapuoti	
2016	Sweet Dreams	Simone	
2019	The Traitor	Giovanni Falcone	
2020	The Bad Poet	Achille Starace	
2022	Exterior Night	Francesco Cossiga	Nominated – David di Donatello for Best Supporting Actor
2023	Kidnapped	Salomone Mortara	
2024	Sicilian Letters	Emilio Schiavon	
2025	Duse	Gabriele D'Annunzio	
2026	Children of the Monkey	Roberto	
