= Sometimes Sadness, Sometimes Rebellion =

2026 drama film by María Aparicio

- Promotional poster
- Spanish: A veces me entra tristeza, otras veces rebelión
- Directed by: María Aparicio
- Written by: María Aparicio
- Produced by: Ana Apontes; Rodrigo Guerrero; Ramiro Sonzini; María Aparicio
- Starring: Eva Bianco; Roger Koza
- Cinematography: Ezequiel Salinas
- Edited by: Ramiro Sonzini
- Production companies: La buena hora; Las Flores
- Release date: 6 September 2026 (Venice)
- Running time: 100 minutes
- Countries: Spain; Argentina
- Language: Spanish

Sometimes Sadness, Sometimes Rebellion (Spanish: A veces me entra tristeza, otras veces rebelión) is a 2026 drama film written and directed by María Aparicio. A co-production of Spain and Argentina, it stars Eva Bianco and Roger Koza.

The film had its world premiere in the Giornate degli Autori section of the 83rd Venice International Film Festival on 6 September 2026, where it won the Director's Award.

== Synopsis ==
Traveling aimlessly through Madrid, Eva's attitude changes when she encounters Dante, an Argentine labor history researcher studying Juan Bialet Massé, at the Reina Sofía Museum.

== Cast ==
- Eva Bianco as Eva
- Roger Koza as Dante

== Production ==
The film was inspired by Aparicio's time living in Madrid supported by a grant from the Reina Sofía Museum.

== Release ==
The film debuted on 6 September 2026 in the Giornate degli Autori section of 83rd Venice International Film Festival, where it received the GdA Director's Award.

== Reception ==
=== Accolades ===
Year	Award	Category	Recipient(s)	Result	Ref.
2026	Venice International Film Festival	Giornate degli Autori Director's Award	María Aparicio	Won	
