= Jacqueline Lentzou =

Greek filmmaker (born 1989)

- Ζακλίν Λέντζου
- Lentzou at the 2026 Busan International Film Festival
- Born: 6 June 1989 (age 37); Athens, Greece
- Education: American College of Greece; London Film School
- Occupations: Director; screenwriter
- Years active: 2013–present

Jacqueline Lentzou (Greek: Ζακλίν Λέντζου; born 6 June 1989) is a Greek film director and screenwriter.

== Early life ==
Lentzou was born in Athens and raised in Thessaloniki. She grew up with her mother and grandmother, and originally wanted to be a writer. She became interested in pursuing film at the age of 14 after watching Gus Van Sant's Elephant (2003). She earned film degrees from both the American College of Greece and the London Film School. While a student at the London Film School, she paused her studies for 18 months to care for her father, who had multiple sclerosis, back in Greece.

== Career ==
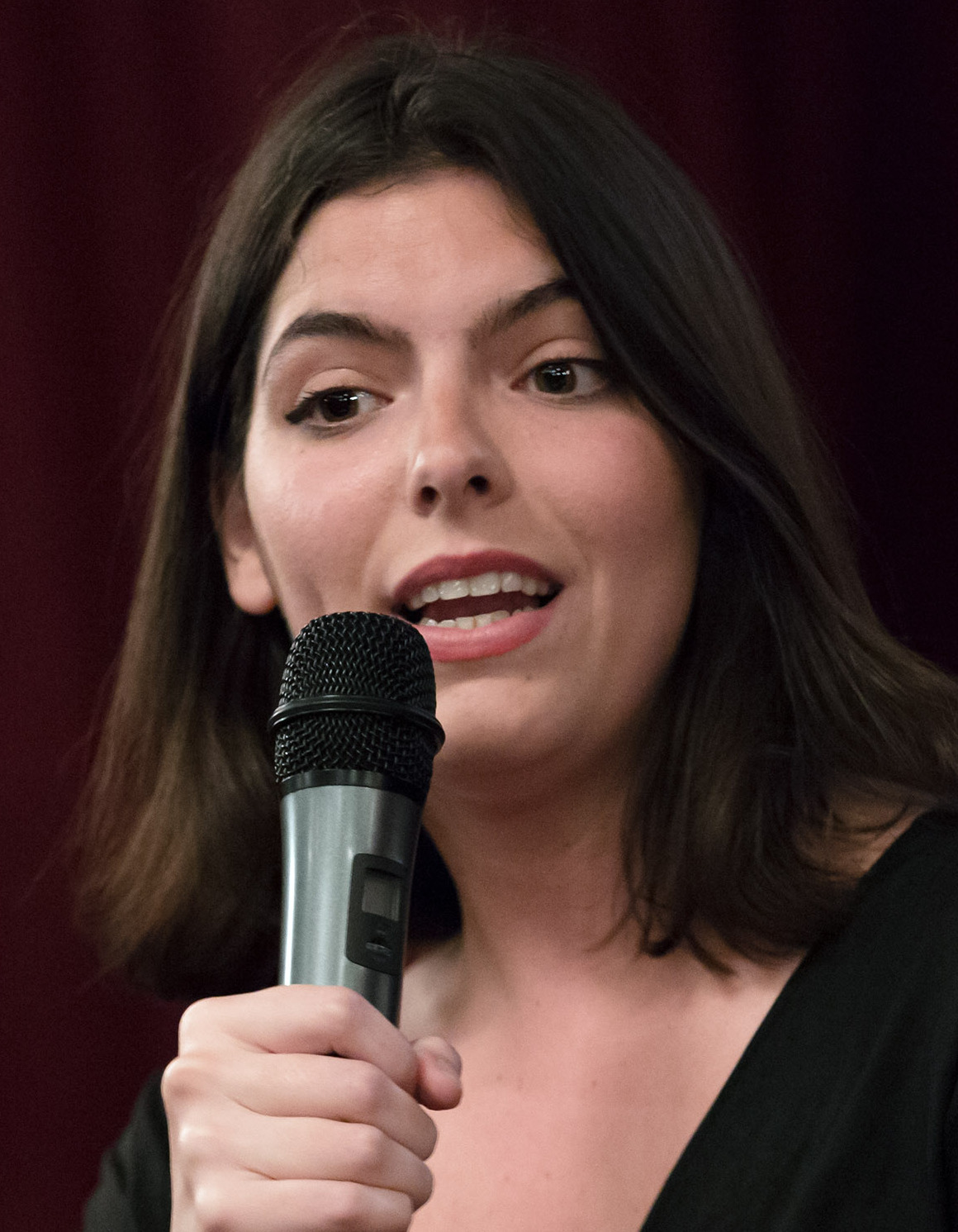
Lentzou in 2017

Lentzou's graduation film from the London Film School, Thirteen Blue, won the Golden Egg at the Reykjavík International Film Festival in 2014. She went on to write and direct several short films, including Hector Malot: The Last Day of the Year, which won the Leica Cine Discovery Prize at the 2018 Cannes Film Festival.

Her first feature film, Moon, 66 Questions, was inspired by her time caring for her ill father while a student. The film went on to win the Golden Puffin at the Reykjavík International Film Festival in 2021. Her second feature film, A Day in the Life of Jo: Chapter Phaedra, was screened in the Orizzonti section of the 2026 Venice Film Festival, where she won the Best Director Award.

== Filmography ==
Year	Title	Director	Writer	Notes	Ref.
2013	Thirteen Blue	Yes	Yes	Short film	
2016	Fox	Yes	Yes	Short film	
2017	Hiwa	Yes	Yes	Short film	
2018	Hector Malot: The Last Day of the Year	Yes	Yes	Short film	
2020	The End of Suffering (A Proposal)	Yes	Yes	Short film	
2021	Moon, 66 Questions	Yes	Yes		
2023	Pleiades (or Going Home)	Yes	Yes	Short film	
2026	A Day in the Life of Jo: Chapter Phaedra	Yes	Yes		

== Awards and nominations ==
Award	Year	Category	Nominated work	Result	Ref.
Cannes Film Festival	2018	Leica Cine Discovery Prize	Hector Malot: The Last Day of the Year	Won	
Festival International du Film Francophone de Namur	2018	International Short Film Competition	Hector Malot: The Last Day of the Year	Jury Mention	
Hellenic Film Academy Awards	2019	Best Short Film	Hector Malot: The Last Day of the Year	Won	
Reykjavík International Film Festival	2014	Golden Egg	Thirteen Blue	Won	
Reykjavík International Film Festival	2021	Golden Puffin	Moon, 66 Questions	Won	
Seville European Film Festival	2021	Best Film in The New Waves	Moon, 66 Questions	Won	
Venice Film Festival	2026	Orizzonti Award for Best Film	A Day in the Life of Jo: Chapter Phaedra	Nominated	
Venice Film Festival	2026	Orizzonti Award for Best Director	A Day in the Life of Jo: Chapter Phaedra	Won	
