= Songs of Forgotten Trees =

2025 film by Anuparna Roy

- Directed by: Anuparna Roy
- Screenplay by: Anuparna Roy
- Produced by: Bibhanshu Rai; Romil Modi; Ranjan Singh; Anurag Kashyap
- Starring: Naaz Shaikh; Sumi Baghel; Bhushan Shimpi; Ravi Maan; Pritam Pilania; Lovely Singh
- Cinematography: Debjit Samanta
- Edited by: Ashish Patel
- Music by: Nishant Ramteke
- Production companies: River Tale Films; Romil Casting; Flip Films; Nube Studio; Khan & Kumar Media
- Distributed by: Celluloid Dreams
- Release date: 1 September 2025 (Venice)
- Running time: 77 minutes
- Country: India
- Language: Hindi

Songs of Forgotten Trees is a 2025 Indian drama film written and directed by Anuparna Roy, and starring Naaz Shaikh and Sumi Baghel, with Bhushan Shimpi, Ravi Maan, Pritam Pilania, and Lovely Singh in supporting roles.

The film had its world premiere in the Orizzonti (Horizons) section of the 82nd Venice International Film Festival on 1 September 2025, where Roy became the first Indian filmmaker to win the Best Director award in that category.

== Plot ==
In Mumbai, a young migrant and aspiring actress supports herself through part time sex work while renting out her benefactor's apartment. She sublets the flat to another migrant, a call-centre worker recently arrived in the city. At first, their shared space offers little more than cohabitation, but over time a quiet affinity develops between them. Amid the indifferent hustle of the metropolis, their connection grows through unspoken understanding, small gestures of care, and shared silences, forming a fragile bond shaped by their individual pasts and survival in the vast, unseen margins of urban life.

== Cast ==
- Naaz Shaikh as Thooya
- Sumi Baghel as Swetha
- Bhushan Shimpi
- Ravi Maan
- Pritam Pilania
- Lovely Singh

== Release ==
The film premiered in the Orizzonti section of the 82nd Venice International Film Festival, where Anuparna Roy won the Best Director award, becoming the first Indian filmmaker to receive the prize in this category.
