= London (2026 film) =

2026 Brazilian drama film

- International promotional poster
- Directed by: Victor Di Marco; Marcio Picoli
- Written by: Victor Di Marco; Marcio Picoli
- Produced by: Victor Di Marco; Aline Gutierres; Laura Moglia; Márcio Picoli
- Starring: Victor Di Marco; Carla Cassapo; Jessica Teixeira
- Cinematography: Bruno Polidoro
- Edited by: Will Domingos
- Music by: Vito O. Azevedo
- Production companies: Proa & Popa Productions; Balde de Tinta; White Wolfy
- Release date: 6 September 2026 (Venice)
- Running time: 90 minutes
- Country: Brazil
- Language: Portuguese

London is a 2026 Brazilian drama film written and directed by Victor Di Marco and Marcio Picoli in their feature film directorial debut. It stars Di Marco as London, a young disabled queer man who works as an erotic performer in a fetish house in São Paulo.

The film had its world premiere in the International Critics' Week section of the 83rd Venice International Film Festival on 6 September 2026, where it won the Queer Lion.

== Synopsis ==
A queer drama about disability, desire, and personal freedom, the story follows London, a young disabled man who has shaped his whole life around staying fiercely independent. He works as a dominant in a fetish house with his friends Luke and Lilá. When a doctor offers him a chance to learn more about his body and disability through a medical exam, London faces a tough choice: he wants clear answers, but he's afraid that getting a diagnosis might turn his identity into a medical label and weaken the independence he has worked so hard to protect.

== Cast ==
- Victor Di Marco as London
- Carla Cassapo as Helena
- Jessica Teixeira as Luiza
- Pedro Bertoldi
- Priscilla Colombi
- Emilio Farias
- Manu Thedy

== Production ==
The film has the support of Berlinale Talents which is a Berlin International Film Festival event. Bruno Polidoro Cinematographer is a Berlin 2022 participant.

== Release ==
London premiered in competition at the 41st International Critics' Week section of the 2026 Venice International Film Festival on 6 September 2026.

== Accolades ==
Award	Date of ceremony	Category	Recipient(s)	Result	Ref.
Venice Film Festival	12 September 2026	Venice International Critics' Week – Grand Prize	Victor Di Marco, Marcio Picoli	Nominated	
Venice Film Festival	12 September 2026	Queer Lion	Victor Di Marco, Marcio Picoli	Won	
