= Sandrine Blancke =

Belgian actress

- Born: 6 November 1979 (age 46); Uccle, Belgium
- Occupation: film actor
- Years active: 1991-present

Sandrine Blancke (born 6 November 1978) is a Belgian French actress. She started her acting career as a child actor at the age of 13 in the 1991 film Toto le héros. She was nominated for Best Supporting Actress at the 1st Magritte Awards.

== Filmography ==
- Toto the Hero (1991)
- The Return of Casanova (1992)
- Shadow of a Doubt (1993)
- Sister Smile (2009)
- Arrêtez-moi là (2016)
- The Seduction (2025)
- Silent Rebellion (2025)
- A Man of His Time (2026)
- Diane in the Loop (2026)

== Awards and nominations ==
Year	Award	Category	Work	Result	Ref.
2024	Magritte Awards	Best Supporting Actress	Dalva	Won	
