= Hombre al agua =

2026 comedy film by Gael García Bernal

- Mexican promotional poster
- Directed by: Gael García Bernal
- Written by: Gael García Bernal; Mariano Pensotti
- Produced by: Gael García Bernal; Diego Luna; Fernanda de la Peza; Stacy Perskie
- Starring: Gael García Bernal; Esmeralda Pimentel; Débora Nascimento; Natalia Oreiro; Anna Díaz
- Cinematography: Fabrizio La Palombara
- Edited by: Yibrán Asuad
- Music by: Memo Guerra
- Production companies: La Corriente del Golfo; Carcava Cine; Redrum
- Release date: 6 September 2026 (Venice)
- Running time: 116 minutes
- Country: Mexico
- Language: Spanish

Hombre al agua is a 2026 Mexican comedy-drama film directed by Gael García Bernal, and co-written with Mariano Pensotti. It stars Bernal as Camilo, a Cuban lifeguard who saves the life of Abel, a rich Mexican businessman.

The film had its world premiere in the Venice Spotlight section of the 83rd Venice International Film Festival on 6 September 2026.

== Cast ==
- Gael García Bernal as Camilo
- Esmeralda Pimentel
- Débora Nascimento
- Natalia Oreiro
- Anna Díaz
- Ezequiel Díaz
- Manuel Garcia-Rulfo
- Jorge Salinas
- Ricky Martin
