= Moon, 66 Questions =

- Greek languages: Selini, 66 erotiseis
- Directed by: Jacqueline Lentzou
- Written by: Jacqueline Lentzou
- Produced by: Fenia Cossovitsa
- Starring: Sofia Kokkali; Lazaros Georgakopoulos
- Cinematography: Konstantinos Koukoulios
- Edited by: Smaro Papaevangelou
- Music by: Delphine Malaussena
- Production company: Blonde Audiovisual Productions
- Distributed by: Danaos; Luxbox
- Release date: March 18, 2021 (Vilnius)
- Running time: 108 minutes
- Countries: France; Greece
- Language: Greek

Moon, 66 Questions (Greek: Σελήνη, 66 ερωτήσεις, Selini, 66 erotiseis) is a French-Greek drama film, directed by Jacqueline Lentzou and released in 2021. The film stars Sofia Kokkali as Artemis, a young woman who is forced to care for her estranged father Paris (Lazaros Georgakopoulos) after he suffers a debilitating illness, with their fractured relationship taking a turn toward healing when she discovers that her father has spent his life in the closet about being gay.

Lentzou described the film as inspired by a desire to explore the reverse of the more common story of parents reacting to a child coming out as gay.

The film premiered in March 2021 at the Vilnius International Film Festival in the European Debut competition for first-time filmmakers. It was later screened in the Encounters program at the 71st Berlin International Film Festival.

== Reception ==
Wendy Ide of The Observer praised the film's elliptical storytelling and described Lentzou's feature debut as notably confident in its use of cinematic form, particularly the visual expression of the emotional distance between Artemis and her father.

== Awards ==
The film won the Golden Puffin award at the 2021 Reykjavík International Film Festival. Kokkali won the award for best actress in the international film slate at the 2021 Festival du nouveau cinéma.
