= Children of the Monkey =

2026 Italian drama film

- Italian theatrical release poster
- Italian: I figli della scimmia
- Directed by: Tommaso Landucci
- Written by: Tommaso Landucci; Damiano Femfert
- Produced by: Andrea Calbucci; Andrea Leone; Maurizio Piazza; Riccardo Scamarcio
- Starring: Riccardo Scamarcio; Fausto Russo Alesi
- Cinematography: Guido Michelotti
- Edited by: Andrea Maguolo
- Production companies: Lungta Film; Lebowski; Mosaicon Film
- Distributed by: Medusa Film
- Release dates: 7 September 2026 (Venice); 17 September 2026 (Italy)
- Running time: 110 minutes
- Country: Italy
- Language: Italian

Children of the Monkey (Italian: I figli della scimmia) is a 2026 Italian drama film directed by Tommaso Landucci, in his feature directorial debut, and co-written with Damiano Femfert. It stars Riccardo Scamarcio, Fausto Russo Alesi, Lidiya Liberman, Cristina Odasso, and Tancredi Naldini.

The film had its world premiere in the Orizzonti section of the 83rd Venice International Film Festival on 7 September 2026, where it won the section's Best Screenplay and Best Actor (for Scamarcio). It was theatrically released in Italy by Medusa Film on 17 September.

== Cast ==
- Riccardo Scamarcio as Dario
- Fausto Russo Alesi as Roberto
- Lidiya Liberman as Ginevra
- Cristina Odasso as Linda
- Tancredi Naldini as Giacomo
- Andrea Aggio as Enrico
- Luigi Diberti as Dario's father

== Production ==
The film's screenplay won the 2021 Premio Solinas and the 2023 Grand Prize at the Sam Spiegel International Film Lab. The film was produced by Lungta Film, Lebowski and Mosaicon Film. James Ivory served as executive producer. It was shot in Turin between January and February 2026.

The title is a reference to Aesop's fable The Monkeys and Their Mother, which served as inspiration for the script.

Tommaso Landucci and Damiano Femfert with Orizzonti Award for Best Screenplay at the 83rd Venice International Film Festival

== Release ==
The film had its world premiere in the Orizzonti section of the 83rd Venice International Film Festival on 7 September, where Tommaso Landucci and Damiano Femfert won the section's Best Screenplay prize and Riccardo Scamarcio won the Best Actor prize.

It was theatrically released in Italy by Medusa Film on 17 September 2026.

== Reception ==
Cineuropa's critic Camillo De Marco praised the film, highlighting Landucci's "sure-handed command of writing" and "stripped-down directorial approach". Micropsia called the film "remarkably realistic in its portrayal of parents raising a disabled child" and "both deeply felt and impressively sensitive", but criticized the secondary storylines as underdeveloped. Matthew Joseph Jenner from International Cinephile Society lauded the film, giving it a 4/5 rating and noting it is "evidence that some stories are most effective when they are told without embellishment, and instead take a more direct path, in which meaning is prioritised over spectacle or overwrought emotions.

== Accolades ==
Year	Award	Category	Nominee(s)	Result	Ref.
2026	83rd Venice International Film Festival	Best Screenplay — Horizons competition	Tommaso Landucci, Damiano Femfert	Won	
2026	83rd Venice International Film Festival	Best Actor — Horizons competition	Riccardo Scamarcio	Won	
2026	23rd Seville European Film Festival	Best Director	Tommaso Landucci	Won	
