= Anuparna Roy =

Indian filmmaker

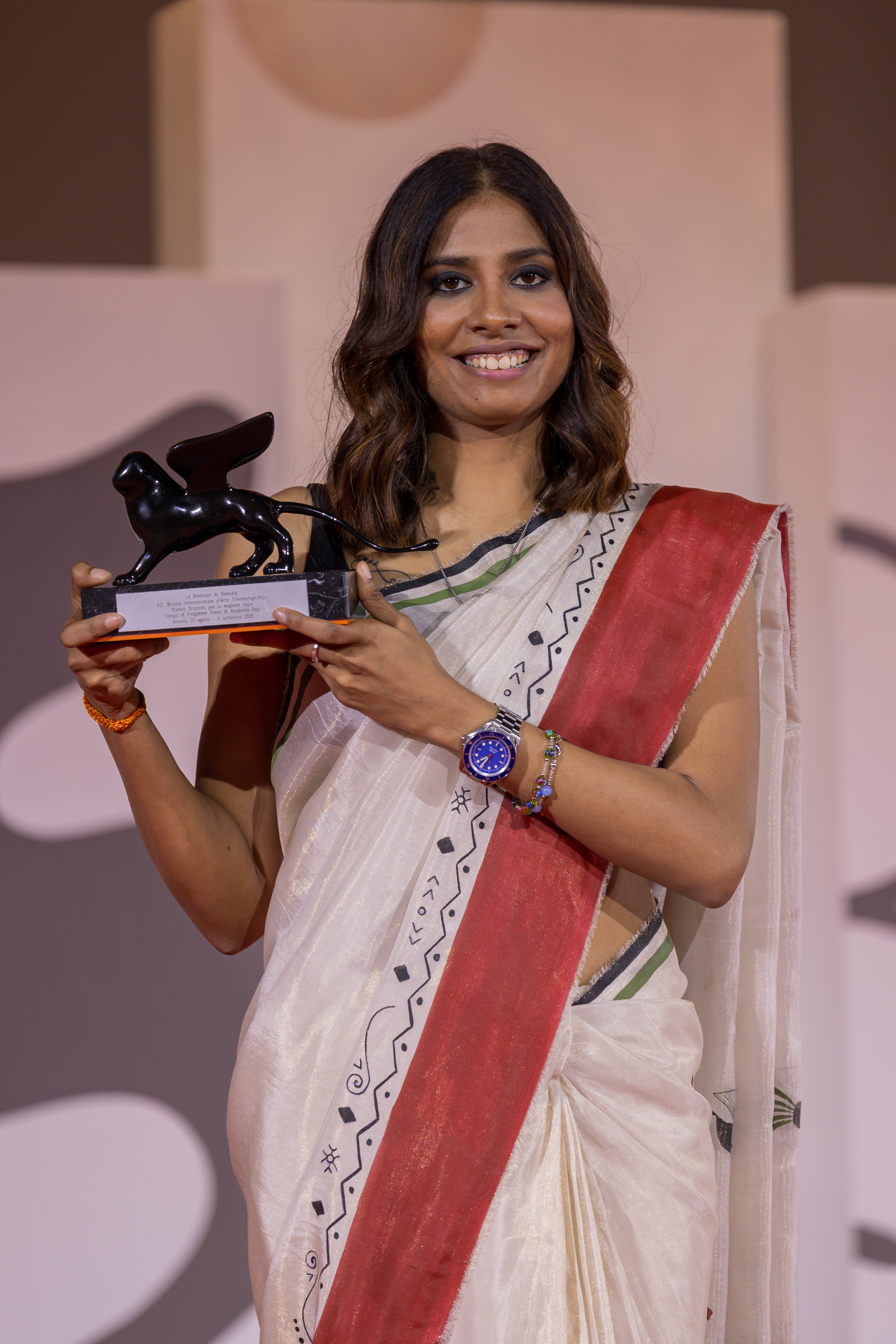
- Roy in 2025
- Born: 9 May 1994 (age 32); Narayanpur, Purulia, West Bengal, India
- Education: Burdwan University
- Occupations: Film director; screenwriter

Anuparna Roy (born 9 May 1994) is an Indian film director and screenwriter. She won the Best Director Award in the Orizzonti (Horizons) section at the 82nd Venice International Film Festival in 2025 for her debut feature film Songs of Forgotten Trees.

== Early life and education ==
Anuparna Roy was raised in Narayanpur, a village in the Purulia district of West Bengal. Her father's name is Brahmananda Roy. Her name was given by noted filmmaker Ritwik Ghatak. She passed from Ranipur Colliery High School and Napara High School. She earned an undergraduate degree in English literature from Kulti College under Burdwan University and later pursued studies in mass communications. Before beginning her film career, she worked in a call centre in Delhi and as an IT sales executive in Mumbai In 2023, she made her debut in the film industry as an assistant director in Run to the River.

== Filmography ==
Year	Title	Director	Producer	Ref
2025	Songs of Forgotten Trees	Yes	No	
2026	Lovers in the Blue Night	Yes	No	

== Awards and honours ==
- 2025 — Best Director, Orizzonti section, for Songs of Forgotten Trees. at the 2025 Venice International Film Festival.
- 2026 — NETPAC Award for the film Lovers in the Blue Night, 2026 Venice International Film Festival.

=== Honours ===
- 2026: In October 2026, Roy served as a member of the Sonje Award Jury at the 31st Busan International Film Festival.
