= A Good Little Soldier =

2026 French drama film

- Theatrical release poster
- French: Un bon petit soldat
- Directed by: Stéphane Brizé
- Written by: Coralie Amedeo; Stéphane Brizé; Olivier Gorce
- Produced by: Sidonie Dumas
- Starring: Alba Rohrwacher; Vincent Lindon; David Talbot; Sharif Andoura
- Cinematography: Antoine Heberlé
- Edited by: Géraldine Mangenot
- Music by: Bertrand Blessing
- Production companies: Gaumont; France 3 Cinéma
- Distributed by: Gaumont
- Release dates: 9 September 2026 (Venice); 25 November 2026 (France)
- Running time: 102 minutes
- Country: France
- Language: French

A Good Little Soldier (French: Un bon petit soldat) is a 2026 French drama film directed by Stéphane Brizé, co-written with Coralie Amedeo and Olivier Gorce. It stars Alba Rohrwacher, Vincent Lindon, David Talbot, and Sharif Andoura.

The film had its world premiere in the main competition of the 83rd Venice International Film Festival on 9 September 2026, where it won the Best Screenplay award. It's scheduled to be theatrically released in France by Gaumont on 25 November.

== Cast ==
- Alba Rohrwacher as Carla
- Vincent Lindon
- David Talbot
- Sharif Andoura
- Philippe Pollet-Villard

== Production ==
Produced by Sidonie Dumas for Gaumont, and co-produced by France 3 Cinéma. The film marks Brizé's 11th feature film, and his sixth collaboration with Vincent Lindon.

Principal photography took place in Paris and the Île-de-France region. French cinematographer Antoine Héberlé was the director of photography.

== Release ==
The film had its world premiere in the main competition of the 83rd Venice International Film Festival on 9 September 2026, where it will compete for the Golden Lion. It's scheduled to be theatrically released in France by Gaumont on 25 November.

== Reception ==
On review aggregator Rotten Tomatoes, the film holds an approval rating of 92% based on 12 reviews, with an average rating of 6.5/10. Metacritic, which uses a weighted average, assigned the film a score of 66 out of 100, based on 5 critics, indicating "generally favorable reviews".
