= No Paradise If You Are Killed by a Woman =

2026 war film by Halkawt Mustafa

- International promotional poster
- Kurdish: بەهەشت نابینیت ئەگەر ژن بتکوژێت
- Directed by: Halkawt Mustafa
- Written by: Halkawt Mustafa
- Produced by: Halkawt Mustafa; Janne Hjeltnes; John M. Jacobsen
- Starring: Avan Jamal; Thorbjørn Harr
- Cinematography: John-Erling Holmenes Fredriksen
- Edited by: Wibecke Rønseth
- Music by: Trond Bjerknes
- Production companies: Hene Films AS; The Chimney Pot; True Colours
- Distributed by: Norsk Filmdistribusjon (Norway); Empire Entertainment (MENA)
- Release date: 7 September 2026 (Venice)
- Running time: 110 minutes
- Countries: Norway; Iraq; United Arab Emirates; Sweden
- Languages: Kurdish; Norwegian; Arabic; English

No Paradise If You Are Killed by a Woman (Kurdish: بەهەشت نابینیت ئەگەر ژن بتکوژێت, romanized: Beheşit nabînît eger jin bitkujêt, Arabic: لن تدخل الجنة إذا قتلتك امرأة, romanized: Lan tadakhkhul al-jannah idhā qatalatk imraʼah) is a 2026 war film written, produced, and directed by Halkawt Mustafa. A co-production between Norway, Iraq, United Arab Emirates, and Sweden, it stars Avan Jamal as Vyan, a Kurdish female sniper during the War in Iraq (2013–2017).

The film had its world premiere out of competition at the 83rd Venice International Film Festival on 7 September 2026. It was also selected as the Iraqi entry for Best International Feature Film at the 99th Academy Awards.

== Synopsis ==
Vyan, a female Peshmerga sniper, returns to Mosul to rescue her younger sister, who she previously believed died when the Islamic State captured the city in 2014.

== Cast ==
- Avan Jamal as Vyan
- Thorbjørn Harr
- Kanar Sarchl as C. Kanar
- Kader Jalal as G.Talib

== Production ==
Shot on location in Mosul, the film was produced by Hene Films AS in co-production with La Media and The Chimney Pot. According to Variety, the story is based on Mustafa's conversations with women who fought against the Islamic State and inspired by Nobel Peace Prize laureate Nadia Murad, who was held captive by the group in 2014.

== Release ==
No Paradise If You Are Killed by a Woman premiered out of competition at the 83rd Venice International Film Festival on 7 September 2026.

== See also ==
- List of submissions to the 99th Academy Awards for Best International Feature Film
- List of Iraqi submissions for the Academy Award for Best International Feature Film
