= Andrea Pallaoro =

Italian film director and screenwriter

- Pallaoro in 2026
- Born: 6 February 1982 (age 44); Trento, Italy
- Education: Hampshire College (BA) California Institute of the Arts (MFA)
- Occupation: Filmmaker

Andrea Pallaoro (born 6 February 1982) is an Italian filmmaker. Most known for his films Hannah (2017) and Monica (2022).

== Early life ==
He was born in Trento, Italy. He left the city at the age of 17 to spend his senior year of high school abroad in Colorado. He earned a master’s degree in film directing from the California Institute of the Arts and a degree in Film from Hampshire College.

== Career ==
His short film Wunderkammer won six international awards and has been selected in the official competition of over fifty film festivals around the world, including at 2008 Sundance Film Festival.

His film feature film debut, Medeas (2013), premiered at the Orizzonti section of the 70th Venice International Film Festival. Pallaoro won numerous international awards including Best Director at The Marrakech Film Festival, the Sergej Parajanov Award for Outstanding Poetic Vision at the Tbilisi International Film Festival, and the New Voices/New Visions Award at the Palm Springs International Film Festival. Chayse Irvin received the award for best cinematographer's debut at Camerimage.

His second feature and the first of an intended trilogy of films centering on a female lead, Hannah (2017), premiered at the main competition of the 74th Venice International Film Festival, where it won the Volpi Cup for Best Actress for Charlotte Rampling, alongside a nomination for the César Award for Best Foreign Film.

Pallaoro holds an MFA in Film Directing from the California Institute of the Arts and a BA from Hampshire College.

In 2013 and 2015 he was awarded a Yaddo Residency and is the recipient of the 2017 Jerome Foundation Filmmaking Grant. He has served in the jury of multiple international film festivals including the 75th Venice Film Festival, the Chicago International Film Festival, the Black Nights Tallinn International Film Festival and the Biografilm International Film festival.

== Personal life ==
Andrea lives between Los Angeles and New York.

== Filmography ==
=== Feature films ===
Year	Title
2013	Medeas
2017	Hannah
2022	Monica
2026	The Echo Chamber

=== Short films ===
2008 - Wunderkammer
