= Blood of My Blood (2015 film) =

2015 film

- Film poster
- Directed by: Marco Bellocchio
- Written by: Marco Bellocchio
- Starring: Roberto Herlitzka; Pier Giorgio Bellocchio; Lidija Liberman; Fausto Russo Alesi; Alba Rohrwacher; Federica Fracassi; Alberto Cracco; Bruno Cariello; Filippo Timi
- Cinematography: Daniele Ciprì
- Music by: Carlo Crivelli
- Release date: 8 September 2015 (Venice)
- Running time: 106 minutes
- Country: Italy
- Language: Italian
- Box office: $424,494

Blood of My Blood (Italian: Sangue del mio sangue) is a 2015 Italian drama film directed by Marco Bellocchio. It was screened in the main competition section of the 72nd Venice International Film Festival and in the Masters section of the 2015 Toronto International Film Festival.

== Cast ==
- Roberto Herlitzka as the count
- Pier Giorgio Bellocchio as Federico
- Lidiya Liberman as Benedetta
- Alba Rohrwacher as Maria Perletti
- Federica Fracassi as Marta Perletti
- Fausto Russo Alesi as Cacciapuoti
- Alberto Cracco as the Franciscan Inquisitor
- Sebastiano Filocamo as the Father confessor
- Bruno Cariello as Angelo
- Filippo Timi as the madman
- Toni Bertorelli as Dr Cavanna
- Ivan Franek as Rikalkov
- Patrizia Bettini as the count's wife
- Elena Bellocchio as Elena
- Alberto Bellocchio as Cardinal Federico Mai

== Reception ==
=== Box office ===
Blood of My Blood grossed $424,494 at the box office.

=== Critical response ===
Blood of My Blood has an approval rating of 71% on review aggregator website Rotten Tomatoes, based on 7 reviews, and an average rating of 6.7/10. Metacritic assigned the film a weighted average score of 81 out of 100, based on 6 critics, indicating "universal acclaim".

=== Awards ===
Awards
Award	Category	Recipients and nominees	Result
72nd Venice International Film Festival	Golden Lion	Marco Bellocchio	Nominated
72nd Venice International Film Festival	Green Drop Award	Marco Bellocchio	Nominated
72nd Venice International Film Festival	FIPRESCI Award	Marco Bellocchio	Won
