= Before the War =

Before the War is a 2026 Italian drama movie directed by Tommaso Usberti. It stars Luàna Bajrami and Piero Usberti.

The movie won the award for best movie at the 41st Venice International Film Festival's Critics’ Week.
