= Marco Bechis =

Chilean-Italian film screenwriter and director

- Born: 24 October 1955 (age 70)
- Occupations: Screenwriter, film director

Marco Bechis (born in Santiago, Chile) is a Chilean-Italian film screenwriter and director. His film Garage Olimpo was screened at the 1999 Cannes Film Festival in the Un Certain Regard section.

== Selected filmography ==
- Alambrado (1991)
- Garage Olimpo (1999)
- Figli/Hijos (Sons and Daughters) (2001)
- BirdWatchers (2008)
- The Smile of the Leader (2011)
- The Noise of Memory (2014) web serie
- The Noise of Memory, the film (2015)
- All the Schools of the Kingdom (2015)
- Back to Buenos Aires (2026)
