= Orizzonti =

Section of the Venice Film Festival's official selection

- 2026 Best Film winners: Raphaël Balboni and Ann Sirot
- Country: Italy
- Presented by: Venice Film Festival
- First award: 2004
- Currently held by: Ann Sirot and Raphaël Balboni for Diane in the Loop (2026)

Orizzonti (lit. 'Horizons') is a section of the Venice Film Festival's official selection. Inspired by Cannes Film Festival sidebar Un Certain Regard, it features a competition of upcoming filmmakers, usually first or second works, with focus on global independent cinema.

== History ==
Among the filmmakers who have been part of section are: Luca Guadagnino, Josh Safdie and Ben Safdie, Hong Sang-soo, Karim Aïnouz, Frederick Wiseman, Catherine Breillat, Mohsen Makhmalbaf, Quentin Dupieux, Lav Diaz, Wang Bing, Robin Campillo, Jia Zhangke, Gianfranco Rosi, Franco Maresco, Brady Corbet, Pietro Marcello, Kaouther Ben Hania, Saeed Roustayi, Rodrigo Sorogoyen, Oliver Hermanus, Andrea Pallaoro, Gia Coppola, Ti West, Haifaa al-Mansour and Paul Morrissey.

The section usually features awards for Best Film, Best Director, Best Screenplay, Jury Prizes and acting prizes. Alongside the Best Short Film prize for the parallel Orizzonti Short Films Competition.

Until 2025, the Orizzonti section had the Orizzonti Extra sidebar section, which featured an Audience Award. Since the 82nd edition, the section was renamed Venice Spotlight.

== Winners ==
=== Best Film ===
Year	English Title	Original Title	Director(s)	Production Country
2004	The Grand Sons	Les petits fils	Ilan Duran Cohen	France
2005	First on the Moon	Первые на Луне	Aleksei Fedorchenko	Russia
2006	Courthouse on the Horseback	马背上的法庭	Liu Jie	China
2007	Autumn Ball	Sügisball	Veiko Õunpuu	Estonia
2008	Melancholia		Lav Diaz	Philippines
2009	Clash	Engkwentro	Pepe Diokno	Philippines
2010	Summer of Goliath	Verano de Goliat	Nicolás Pereda	Canada, Mexico, Netherlands
2011	Kotoko		Shinya Tsukamoto	Japan
2012	Three Sisters	三姊妹	Wang Bing	China
2013	Eastern Boys		Robin Campillo	France
2014	Court		Chaitanya Tamhane	India
2015	Free in Deed		Jake Mahaffy	United States, New Zealand
2016	Libera Nos	Liberami	Federica Di Giacomo	Italy, France
2017	Nico, 1988		Susanna Nicchiarelli	Italy, Belgium
2018	Manta Ray	กระเบนราหู	Phuttiphong Aroonpheng	Thailand, France, China
2019	Atlantis	Атлантида	Valentyn Vasyanovych	Ukraine
2020	The Wasteland	دشت خاموش	Ahmad Bahrami	Iran
2021	Pilgrims	Piligrimai	Laurynas Bareiša	Lithuania
2022	World War III	جنگ جهانی سوم	Houman Seyyedi	Iran
2023	Explanation for Everything	Magyarázat mindenre	Gábor Reisz	Hungary, Slovakia
2024	The New Year That Never Came	Anul Nou care n-a fost	Bogdan Mureșanu	Romania
2025	On the Road	En el Camino	David Pablos	Mexico
2026	Diane in the Loop	Un détour par Diane	Ann Sirot and Raphaël Balboni	Belgium, France

=== Special Jury Prize ===
Year	English Title	Original Title	Director(s)	Ref
2010	The Forgotten Space		Noël Burch and Allan Sekula	
2011	Whores' Glory		Michael Glawogger	
2012	Tango libre		Frédéric Fonteyne	
2013	Ruin		Amiel Courtin-Wilson and Michael Cody	
2014	Belluscone: A Sicilian Story	Belluscone, una storia siciliana	Franco Maresco	
2015	Neon Bull	Boi neon	Gabriel Mascaro	
2016	Big Big World	Koca Dünya	Reha Erdem	
2017	Caniba		Verena Paravel and Lucien Castaing-Taylor	
2018	The Announcement	Anons	Mahmut Fazil Coşkun	
2019	Verdict		Raymund Ribay Gutierrez	
2020	Listen		Ana Rocha de Sousa	
2021	The Great Movement	El Gran Movimiento	Kiro Russo	
2022	Bread and Salt	Chleb i sól	Damian Kocur	
2023	An Endless Sunday	Una sterminata domenica	Alain Parroni	
2024	One of Those Days When Hemme Dies	Hemme’nin öldüğü günlerden biri	Murat Fıratoğlu	
2025	Lost Land	Hara Watan	Akio Fujimoto	
2026	House of the Wind	La maison du vent	Bernard Auguste Kouemo Yanghu	

=== Best Director ===
Year	Recipient(s)	English Title	Original Title	Ref
2013	Uberto Pasolini	Still Life		
2014	Naji Abu Nowar	Theeb	ذيب	
2015	Brady Corbet	The Childhood of a Leader		
2016	Fien Troch	Home		
2017	Vahid Jalilvand	No Date, No Signature	بدون تاریخ، بدون امضا	
2018	Emir Baigazin	The River	Өзен	
2019	Théo Court	White on White	Blanco en blanco	
2020	Lav Diaz	Genus Pan	Lahi, Hayop	
2021	Éric Gravel	Full Time	À plein temps	
2022	Tizza Covi and Rainer Frimmel	Vera		
2023	Mika Gustafson	Paradise Is Burning	Paradiset brinner	
2024	Sarah Friedland	Familiar Touch		
2025	Anuparna Roy	Songs of Forgotten Trees		
2026	Jacqueline Lentzou	A Day in the Life of Jo: Chapter Phaedra	Mia mera sti zoi tis tzo: kefalaio Faidra	

=== Best Actress ===
Year	Recipient(s)	English Title	Original Title	Ref
2016	Ruth Díaz	The Fury of a Patient Man	Tarde para la ira	
2017	Lyna Khoudri	The Blessed		
2018	Natalia Kudryashova	The Man Who Surprised Everyone	Человек, который удивил всех	
2019	Marta Nieto	Mother	Madre	
2020	Khansa Batma	Zanka Contact		
2021	Laure Calamy	Full Time	À plein temps	
2022	Vera Gemma	Vera		
2023	Margarita Rosa de Francisco	El paraíso		
2024	Kathleen Chalfant	Familiar Touch		
2025	Benedetta Porcaroli	The Kidnapping of Arabella	Il rapimento di Arabella	
2026	Laleh Marzban	Falling House	مراقب	

=== Best Actor ===
Year	Recipient(s)	English Title	Original Title	Ref
2014	Emir Hadžihafizbegović	These Are the Rules	Takva su pravila	
2015	Dominique Leborne	Land Legs	Tempête	
2016	Nuno Lopes	Saint George	São Jorge	
2017	Navid Mohammadzadeh	No Date, No Signature	بدون تاریخ، بدون امضا	
2018	Kais Nashef	Tel Aviv On Fire	תל אביב על האש	
2019	Sami Bouajila	A Son	Bik Eneich: Un fils	
2020	Yahya Mahayni	The Man Who Sold His Skin	الرجل الذي باع ظهره	
2021	Piseth Chhun	White Building	ប៊ូឌីញស	
2022	Mohsen Tanabandeh	World War III	جنگ جهانی سوم	
2023	Tergel Bold-Erdene	City of Wind	Сэр сэр салхи	
2024	Francesco Gheghi	Familia		
2025	Giacomo Covi	A Year of School	Un anno di scuola	
2026	Riccardo Scamarcio	Children of the Monkey	I figli della scimmia	

=== Best Screenplay ===
Year	Recipient(s)	English Title	Original Title	Ref
2016	Wang Bing	Bitter Money	苦钱	
2017	Alireza Khatami	Oblivion Verses	Los Versos del Olvido	
2018	Pema Tseden	Jinpa	ལག་དམར་	
2019	Jessica Palud	Back Home	Revenir	
2020	Pietro Castellitto	The Predators	I predatori	
2021	Péter Kerekes and Ivan Ostrochovský	107 Mothers	Cenzorka	
2022	Fernando Guzzoni	Blanquita		
2023	Enrico Maria Artale	El paraíso		
2024	Scandar Copti	Happy Holidays	ينعاد عليكو	
2025	Ana Cristina Barragán	The Ivy	Hiedra	
2026	Children of the Monkey	I figli della scimmia	Tommaso Landucci and Damiano Femfert	

=== Best Short Film ===
Year	English Title	Original Title	Director(s)	Ref
2010	Coming Attractions		Peter Tscherkassky	
2011	In attesa dell'avvento		Felice D'Agostino and Arturo Lavorato	
2012	Invitation	초대	Yoo Min-young	
2013	Kush		Shubhashish Bhutiani	
2014	Maryam		Sidi Saleh	
2015	Belladonna		Dubravka Turić	
2016	La voz perdida		Marcelo Martinessi	
2017	Gros Chagrin		Céline Devaux	
2018	A Gift	Kado	Aditya Ahmad	
2019	Darling		Saim Sadiq	
2020	Entre tú y milagros		Mariana Saffon	
2021	The Bones	Los Huesos	Cristobal León and Joaquín Cociña	
2022	Snow in September	9-р Сарын Цас	Lkhagvadulam Purev-Ochir	
2023	A Short Trip		Erenik Beqiri	
2024	Who Loves the Sun		Arshia Shakiba	
2025	Without Kelly		Lovisa Sirén	
2026	A Few Moments of Happiness	Quelques instants de bonheur	Shaden Safieddine Tazi	

== Retired Awards ==
=== Best Documentary ===
Year	English Title	Original Title	Director(s)	Ref
2005	East of Paradise		Lech Kowalski	
2006	When the Levees Broke: A Requiem in Four Acts		Spike Lee	
2007	Useless	無用	Jia Zhangke	
2008	Below Sea Level		Gianfranco Rosi	
2009	1428		Du Haibin	

=== Special awards ===
Year	Award	English Title	Original Title	Director(s)	Ref
2013	Special Award for Innovative Content	Fish & Cat	ماهی و گربه	Shahram Mokri	

=== Best Medium-Length Film ===
Year	English Title	Original Title	Director(s)	Ref
2010	Out	צא	Roee Rosen	
2011	Accidentes gloriosos		Mauro Andrizzi and Marcus Lindeen	
