= 79th Locarno Film Festival =

2026 film festival

- Festival official poster
- Opening film: The Green Eyes
- Location: Locarno, Switzerland
- Founded: 1946
- Awards: Golden Leopard: You Don't Belong Here
- Hosted by: Associazione Festival del film Locarno
- Artistic director: Giona A. Nazzaro
- Festival date: 5–15 August 2026
- Website: Locarno Film Festival

Locarno Film Festival
- 80th 78th

The 79th Locarno Film Festival took place from 5 to 15 August 2026, in Locarno, Switzerland. Belgian filmmaker Fabrice Du Welz served as the jury president for the main competition.

Romanian drama film You Don't Belong Here by Florin Șerban was the winner of the Golden Leopard. Matheus Farias and Enock Carvalho's The Riverbank won the Special Jury Prize.

American filmmaker James Gray was awarded the Pardo alla Carriera. While Darren Aronofsky was awarded the Leopard of Honour.

The festival poster was designed by the American artist Cindy Sherman, featuring a fictional character rendered in stark black and white and wrapped in a yellow leopard-spotted headscarf.

The festival opened with the drama film The Green Eyes directed by Fanny Liatard and Jérémy Trouilh.

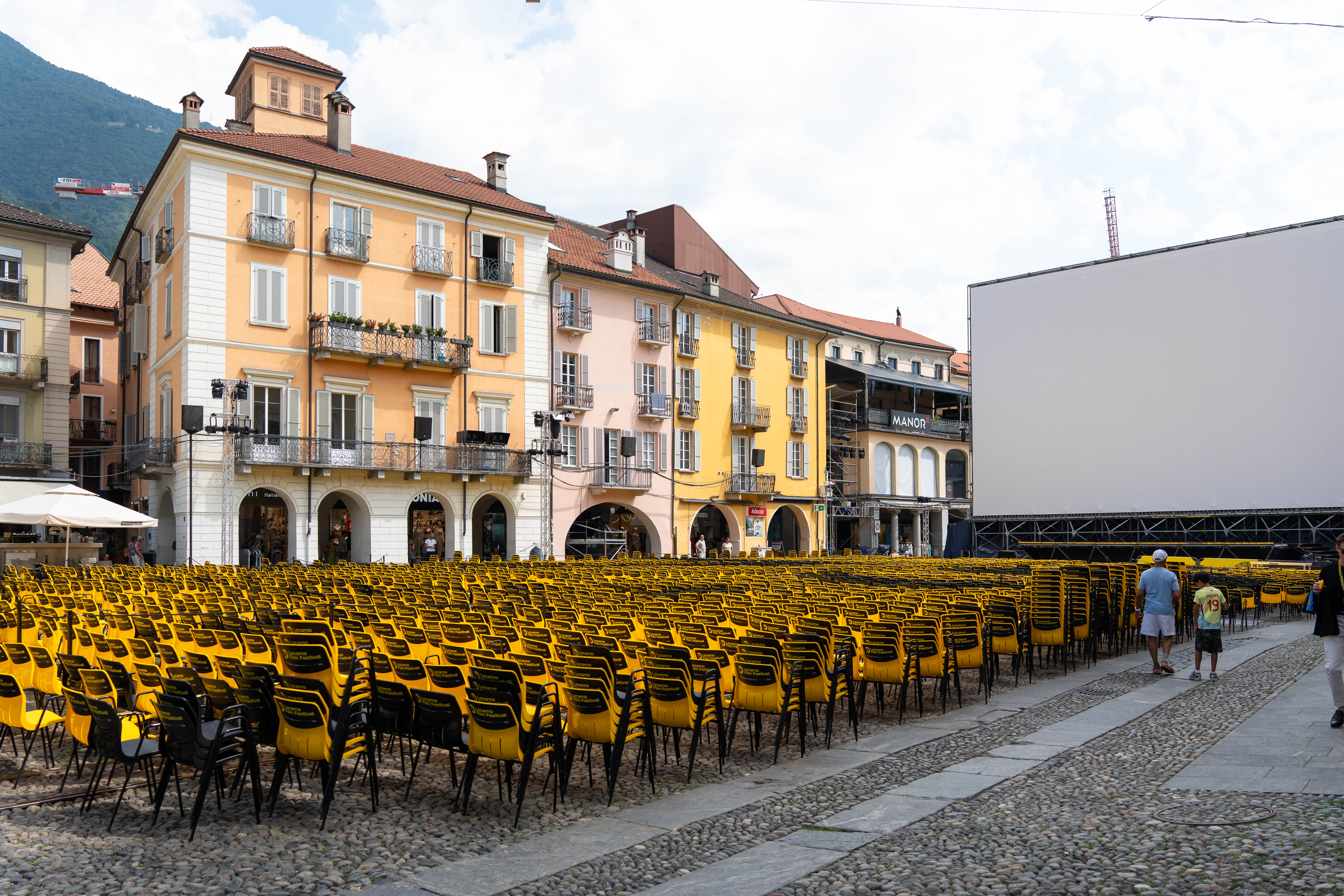
76th edition Piazza Grande

== Juries ==
=== Main Competition ===
- Fabrice Du Welz, Belgian filmmaker - Jury President
- Marco Alessi, Italian producer
- Lolita Chammah, French actress
- Paulina García, Chilean actress, stage director, and playwright
- Olivier Père, French executive director of Arte France Cinéma and former artistic director of the Locarno Film Festival

=== Filmmakers of the Present Competition ===
- Afef Ben Mahmoud, Tunisian actress, filmmaker and producer
- Radovan Síbrt, Czech producer
- Margherita Spampinato, Italian filmmaker

=== Leopard of Tomorrow Competition ===
- Mounia Akl, Lebanese filmmaker
- Antonio Piazza, Italian filmmaker
- Steven Markovitz, South African producer

=== First Feature Competition ===
- Matthieu Darras, French film lab director and programmer
- Sung Moon, South Korean programmer at the Jeonju International Film Festival
- Klaudia Reynicke, Swiss-Peruvian filmmaker

=== Pardo for Change Competition ===
- Gianluca Grossi, Swiss journalist and writer
- Mo Harawe, Somali-Austrian filmmaker
- Seta Thakur, Swiss director at the Wyss Academy for Nature

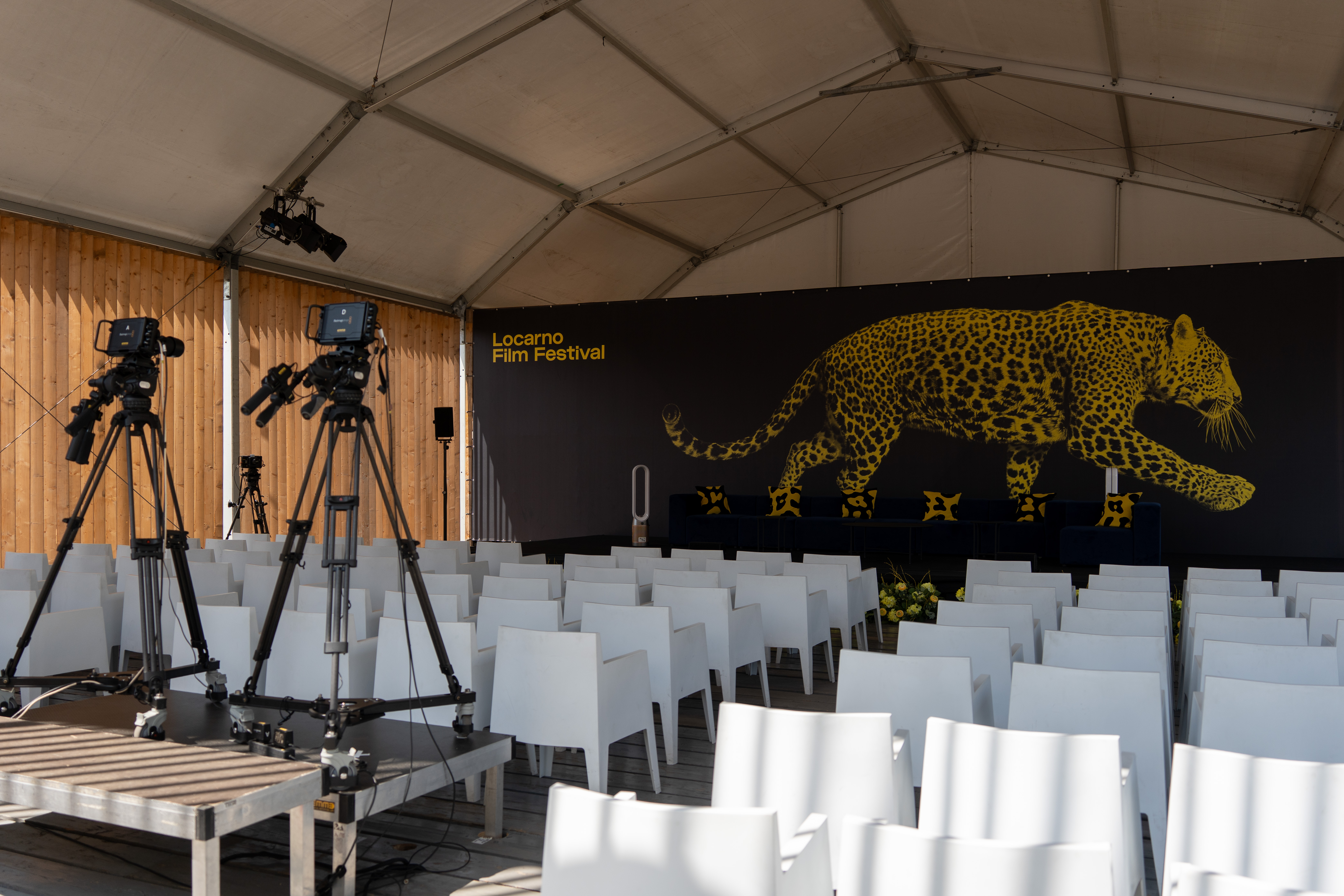
Press room at the festival

== Official sections ==
On 9 July 2026, the full line-up was announced with 11 sections, 3 competitions and 20 awards. From a record 7,759 submissions, This year's program comprises 233 films, including 103 world premieres. The selection committee for feature films was composed by Pamela Biénzobas, Stefan Ivančić, Giovanni Marchini-Camia, Daniela Persico and Eddie Bertozzi, while the shorts program was composed by Eddie Bertozzi, Lucie Emch, Anne Gaschütz and Enrico Vannucci.

=== Piazza Grande ===
The following films were selected to be screened at the Piazza Grande section, competing for the festival's Prix du public (Audience Award):

| English Title | Original Title | Director(s) | Production Country |
|---|---|---|---|
| All About Corinne | Ni vue, ni connue | Marc Fitoussi | France, Belgium |
| Armony | | Dario Albertini | Italy |
| The Chilean | Il Cileno | Sergio Castro-San Martin | Italy, Chile, Switzerland |
| Congo Boy | | Rafiki Fariala | Central African Republic, France, Democratic Republic of Congo, Italy |
| Dances with Wolves - Director's Cut (1990) | | Kevin Costner | United States |
| Down the Arm of God | | Peter Brunner | France, United States |
| Frank & Louis | | Petra Volpe | Switzerland, United Kingdom |
| The Green Eyes (opening film) | Les Yeux Verts | Fanny Liatard and Jérémy Trouilh | France, Belgium, Sweden |
| I Is Another | Ich ist ein Anderer | Felix Randau | Germany, Austria |
| The Invite | | Olivia Wilde | United States |
| Love Lessons | Demain je tombe amoureux | Martin Provost | France, Belgium |
| Paper Tiger | | James Gray | United States |
| Taxi Driver (1976) | | Martin Scorsese | United States |
| Wild at Heart (1990) | | David Lynch | United States |

=== Main Competition (Concorso Internazionale) ===
The following films were selected for the Golden Leopard competition:

| English Title | Original Title | Director(s) | Production Country |
|---|---|---|---|
| Brave New Love | | Maria Bäck | Denmark, Sweden, Greece |
| D'ici là | | Sarah Leonor | France |
| Donkey Princess | Princesa Burro | Cristobal León & Joaquín Cociña | Chile, France, Uruguay, Netherlands, Germany |
| Far From the Trees | Lejos de los árboles | Meritxell Colell | Spain, Peru, Italy |
| Hearing | Thính Giác | Lê Bảo | Vietnam, Singapore, Norway, France, Indonesia, Saudi Arabia, Cambodia, Thailand, Taiwan |
| The House on the Moon | 明月共此時 | Nelson Yeo | Singapore, Taiwan, Germany, Indonesia |
| I Rarely Wake Up Dreaming | Selten wache ich träumend auf | Isabelle Stever | Germany, Ukraine |
| Ketticè | | Giovanni Tortorici | Italy |
| Manhunt | | Wayne Wapeemukwa | Canada |
| Nobody's Violence | Violence du corps de l'autre | Denis Côté | Canada |
| Nowhere to Lay My Eyes | 눈둘데가 없네 | Hong Sang-soo | South Korea |
| Objet a | | Ann Oren | Germany, Luxembourg, Greece |
| O Jacaré | | Basil Da Cunha | Switzerland, Portugal |
| Rehmat | | Gurvinder Singh | India, France |
| The Riverbank | A Margem do Rio | Matheus Farias and Enock Carvalho | Brazil, Germany |
| Wandering Trees | Alberi erranti | Salvatore Mereu | Italy |
| You Don't Belong Here | Nu e locul tau aici | Florin Șerban | Romania |

=== Out of Competition ===
The following films were selected to be screened out of competition:

| English Title | Original Title | Director(s) | Production Country |
|---|---|---|---|
| The Angel Maker | Der Engelmacher | Marina Klauser | Switzerland |
| Asphalt Guerrilla | Guerrilha no Asfalto | Edgar Pêra | Portugal |
| Atcha Atcha | | Mamadou Dia | Senegal, France |
| BAKMA | | Abdelhamid Bouchnak | Tunisia |
| Bloody Tennis | | Nikias Chryssos | Germany |
| Bruton | | Vincent Grashaw | United States |
| Happiness Is So Close! | Ah que le bonheur est proche! | François-Christophe Marzal | Switzerland |
| Marco Bellocchio: The Door to Reality | Marco Bellocchio: La porta della Realtà | Fabio Lovino | Italy |
| Roma Elastica | | Bertrand Mandico | France, Italy |
| Sixteen Moments of My Life | Seize moments de ma vie | Albert Serra | France, Spain |
| Sundown | | Rebekah McKendry | Canada |
| Tomb of Dreams (short) | Tombe des Rêves | F.J. Ossang | France |
| Transition | Übergang | Peter Badel and Chris Wright | Germany |

=== Filmmakers of the Present Competition (Concorso Cineasti del Presente) ===
The Filmmakers of the Present section showcases first and second feature films from emerging filmmakers. The following films were selected to compete for the Golden Leopard – Filmmakers of the Present:

| English Title | Original Title | Director(s) | Production Country |
|---|---|---|---|
| At Night | | Beatrice Gibson | United Kingdom, France |
| The Days Off | Los días libres | Lucila Mariani | Argentina, Brazil, Mexico, France |
| Demons | Демони | Natalya Vorozhbyt | Ukraine, Poland |
| Destroy All Girls | | Erin Vassilopoulos | United States |
| Ego Reach We All (Our Time Will Come) | | Amartei Armar | Ghana, France |
| Fire Flower | Hanabi | Ana Vaz | France, Brazil |
| The Illusion of an Everlasting Summer | La ilusión de un verano sin fin | Alessandra Sanguinetti | Argentina, United States |
| In All My Journeys I Am Returning | Todos mis viajes son viajes de regreso | Manuel Ponce de León | Colombia |
| Magic Atlas | 魔法星图 | Sun Xun | Singapore |
| Revolutionaries Never Die | | Mohanad Yaqubi | Palestine, Belgium, Qatar |
| September Afternoon | | Nicolaas Schmidt | Germany |
| Small Talk | | Mateo Ybarra | Switzerland |
| Summer Meadow | L'estive | Naël Khleifi | Belgium, France |
| Tear Gas | | Uta Beria | Georgia, France, Germany |
| Tomorrow a Long Time Ago | Morgen vor langer Zeit | Luise Donschen | Germany |

=== Leopard of Tomorrow ===
The section features short and medium-length films divided into three competitions: Concorso Internazionale, with works by emerging filmmakers from all over the world; Concorso Nazionale, for Swiss productions; and Concorso Corti d’Autore, with short works by established filmmakers. The following films were selected:

| English Title | Original Title | Director(s) | Production Country |
Concorso Corti d'Autore
| Already Happened | Shi Hou | Hao Zhou | United States, China |
| And If Thuy Didn’t Exist | Et si Thuy n'existait pas | Carlo Francisco Manatad | Philippines, France, Indonesia |
| Ãsheghetam | | Filmsaaz | France, Switzerland, Iran |
| The Blessing | | Caroline Poggi and Jonathan Vinel | France, Switzerland |
| The Bovine Comedy | ค.ยังคงยืนเด่นโดยท้าทาย | Ratchapoom Boonbunchachoke | France |
| Elegy for the Forgotten, on an Endless War | | Bani Khoshnoudi | Iran, France |
| The God That Destroys | | Jyoti Mistry | Austria, Sweden |
| Private Property | | Deepak Rauniyar | United States, Nepal, France, Australia |
| Somewhere in a Free Country | Quelque part dans un pays libre | Antonin Peretjatko | France |
| The Wind, One Brilliant Day | | Ben Rivers | China, United Kingdom |
Concorso Internazionale
| Another Day in the Metal Box | | Gleb Feldman | Ukraine |
| The Architect Who Built His Own Collapse | 崩落 | Chun Tien Chen | Taiwan |
| As a Cure | | Dorothea Sing Zhang | China, United Kingdom |
| Aurora Borealis | | Valeriya Kim | Hungary, Belgium, Portugal, Kazakhstan |
| Drift | | Jérémie Danon and Kiddy Smile | France |
| First Fire | Premier Feu | Blanca Camell Galí | France, Spain |
| Forgotten Spaceman | Hershewe Fazanawerd | Elham Ehsas | United Kingdom, Afghanistan |
| I Have No Mouth, Yet I Must Scream | No Tengo Boca, Aun Así Debo Gritar | Diego Andrés Murillo and Eduardo Andrés Díaz | Venezuela, United States |
| In Dreams When You Can’t Sleep at Night | Dans les rêves quand on dort pas la nuit | Rachel Gutgarts | France |
| In the Silence After | | Sebastian Delascasas | Qatar, United States, Colombia |
| Khufu | | Mahmoud Assi | Egypt, France, Sweden, Canada |
| Las damas | | Camille Zéhenne | France |
| Milk | Melk | Filip Anthonissen | Belgium |
| Mutrion | | Marco Cavazzin | Italy |
| Nadupa | | Daniel Samwel | Tanzania |
| Obscura | Silap Mata Bayang Berbalam | Timoteus Anggawan Kusno | Indonesia, Netherlands |
| Piluk | | Elisapie Isaac and Marc Séguin | Canada |
| A Sweet Day | Yek Rooz-e Shirin | Omid Abdollahi | Iran |
| Together | | Neozoon | Germany |
| The Wanderers | Los andares | Isa Luengo and Sofia Esteve | Spain |
Concorso Nazionale
| The First Flower | | Astrit Ismaili | Kosovo, Switzerland, Netherlands |
| Gherking | | Claudius Gentinetta | Switzerland |
| Maids of Petroleum | | Hans Baumann | United States |
| | Respirer une fois sur trois | Charlyne Genoud | Switzerland |
| Singularity | | Marjolaine Perreten | Switzerland |
| Street of Resistance | | Jan Ciallella | Switzerland |
| Take Care | Alles Gute | Patricia Strübin | Switzerland |
| Typhoon Mambo | | Domenico Singha Pedroli | Switzerland, France, Thailand |
| West/East | Lääne/Vostok | Elia Canevascini | Switzerland |
| Zrugg | | Lars Mulle | Switzerland |

=== Locarno Kids ===
Marking the first competitive year of the section, the films selected will compete for the Locarno Kids Award la Mobiliare, am audience prize awarded by a jury of young viewers. The following films were selected:

| English Title | Original Title | Director(s) | Production Country |
|---|---|---|---|
| Angel Seekers | Cercatori d'angeli | Leopoldo Pescatore | Italy, Switzerland |
| Children of Liberty | New York, Miriam et moi | Rémy Schaepman and Léahn Vivier-Chapas | France, Luxembourg |
| Derborence The Age of Animals | Derborence Le Temps des Animaux | Vincent Chabloz | Switzerland |
| If Luck Will Come | | Camille Bildsøe | Denmark, Iceland, Norway |
| MU-KI-RA | | Estefanía Piñeres Duque | Colombia, Spain |
| The Newcomers | Los nuevos | Rodrigo Plá | Mexico, Spain |
| PARADEISA | | Marleen Valien | Germany |
| The Summer That Ended Twice | L'estate che finì due volte | Matteo Incollu | Italy |
| Viva Carmen | Carmen, l'Oiseau Rebel | Sebastien Laundenbach | France, Finland, Spain |

== Official Awards ==
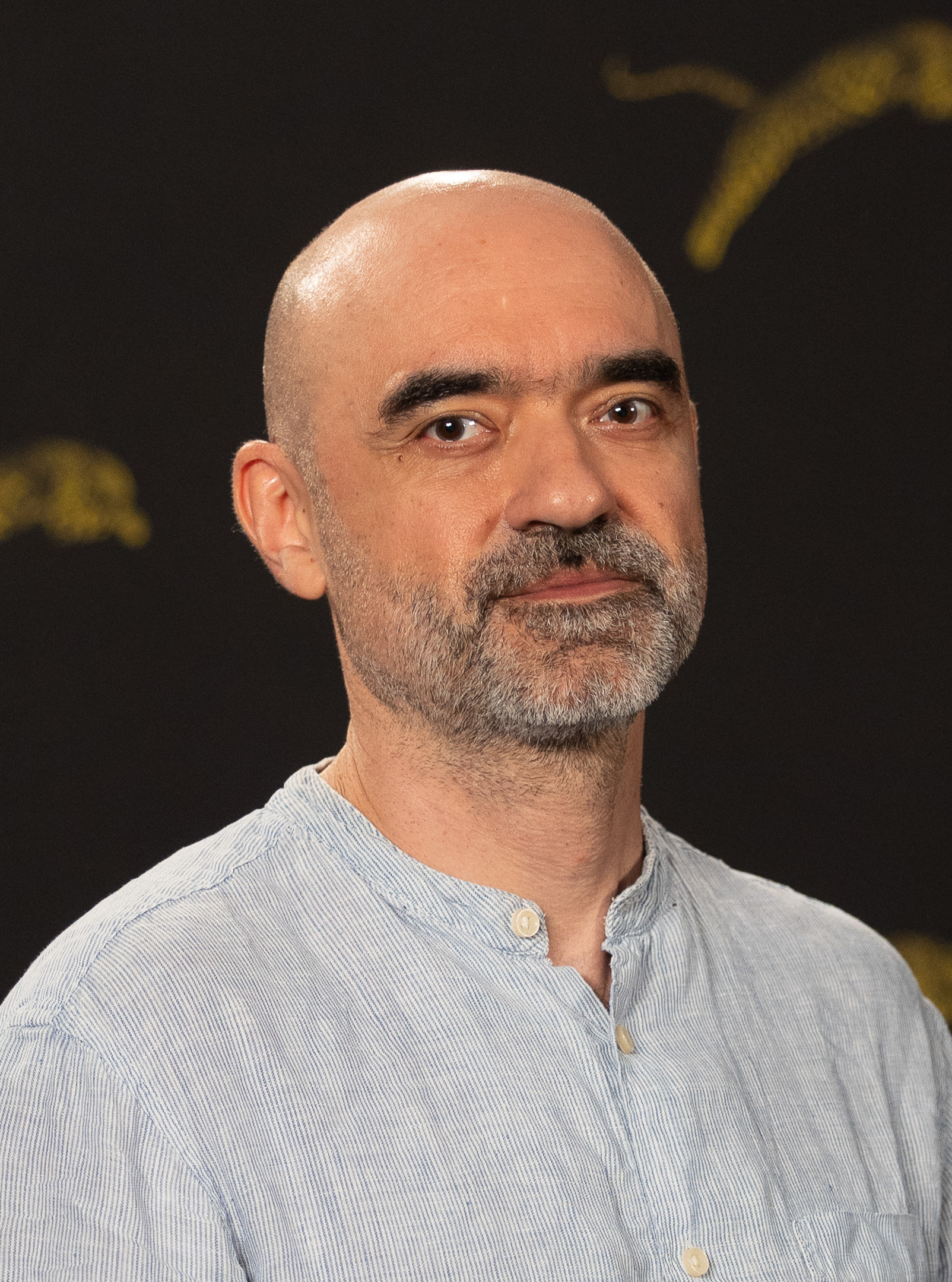
Golden Leopard winner: Florin Șerban

=== Main Competition ===
- Golden Leopard: You Don't Belong Here by Florin Șerban
- Special Jury Prize: The Riverbank by Matheus Farias and Enock Carvalho
- Pardo for Best Direction: Hong Sang-soo for Nowhere to Lay My Eyes
- Pardo for Best Performance:
  - Monica Bellucci for Ketticè
  - Kim Min-hee for Nowhere to Lay My Eyes
- Special Mention:
  - Xavier Bergeron for his performance in Nobody's Violence
  - Teodor Butănescu for his performance in You Don't Belong Here

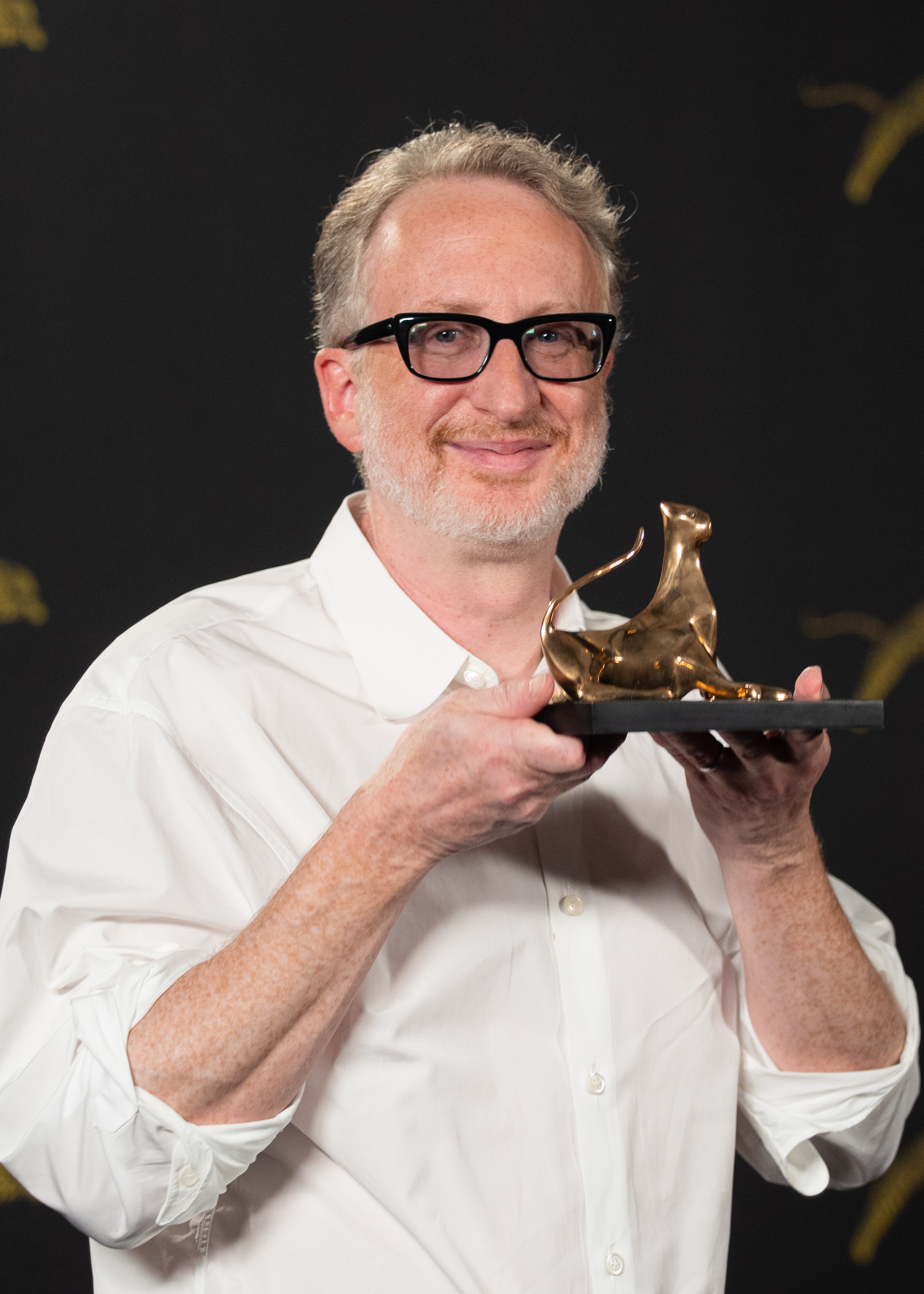
Pardo alla Carriera recipient: James Gray

=== Special Awards ===
- Leopard of Honour: Darren Aronofsky
- Pardo alla Carriera: James Gray

=== Filmmakers of the Present ===
- Golden Leopard – Filmmakers of the Present: The Illusion of an Everlasting Summer by Alessandra Sanguinetti
- Best Emerging Director Award: Beatrice Gibson for At Night
- Special Jury Prize: Revolutionaries Never Die by Mohanad Yaqubi
- Pardo for Best Performance:
  - Idrissu Tontie Jr. for Ego Reach We All (Our Time Will Come)
  - Manal Issa for Summer Meadow
- Special Mention:
  - The Days Off by Lucila Mariani
  - Fire Flower by Ana Vaz

=== Leopard of Tomorrow - Concorso Corti d'Autore ===
- Golden Leopard for the Best Auteur Short Film: The Bovine Comedy by Ratchapoom Boonbunchachoke
  - Special Mention: And If Thuy Didn’t Exist by Carlo Francisco Manatad

=== Leopard of Tomorrow - Concorso Internazionale ===
- Golden Leopard for the Best International Short Film: Milk by Filip Anthonissen
- Silver Leopard for the International Competition: Khufu by Mahmoud Assi
- Pardino for the Best Direction for the International Competition: Marco Cavazzin for Mutrion
- Locarno Short Film Candidate for the European Film Awards: Melk by Filip Anthonissen
  - Special Mention: Las damas by Camille Zéhenne

=== Leopard of Tomorrow - Concorso Nazionale ===
- Golden Leopard for the Best Swiss Short Film: Typhoon Mambo by Domenico Singha Pedroli
- Silver Leopard for the National Competition: Take Care by Patricia Strübin
- Best Swiss Newcomer Award: Charlyne Genoud for Respirer une fois sur trois

=== First Feature Film Competition ===
- The Illusion of an Everlasting Summer by Alessandra Sanguinetti

=== Pardo for Change ===
- Ego Reach We All (Our Time Will Come) by Amartei Armar
  - Special Mention:
    - The Newcomers by Rodrigo Plá
    - Private Property by Deepak Rauniyar

=== Locarno Kids ===
- PARADEISA by Marleen Valien

== Independent Awards ==
=== Prize of the Ecumenical Jury ===
- Nowhere to Lay My Eyes by Hong Sang-soo

=== FIPRESCI Prize ===
- Far From the Trees by Meritxell Colell

=== Europa Cinemas Label ===
- You Don't Belong Here by Florin Șerban
