= 62nd Chicago International Film Festival =

2026 edition of film festival

- Official poster
- Opening film: Club Kid by Jordan Firstman
- Closing film: Behemoth! by Tony Gilroy
- Location: Chicago, United States
- Founded: 1965
- Awards: Gold Hugo: The Dreamed Adventure by Valeska Grisebach
- Hosted by: Cinema/Chicago
- Artistic director: Mimi Plauché
- No. of films: 113
- Festival date: Opening: October 14, 2026; Closing: October 25, 2026
- Website: www.chicagofilmfestival.com

Chicago International Film Festival
- 2027 2025

The 62nd Chicago International Film Festival took place from October 14 to 25, 2026, at the Music Box Theatre in Chicago, United States. It opened with American comedy-drama film Club Kid by Jordan Firstman. The festival presented 113 feature films and 57 shorts from around 60 countries, which included four world premieres, 15 North American premieres and 21 United States premieres.

The awards for all competition categories were announced on October 23. A co-production drama film The Dreamed Adventure by Valeska Grisebach won Gold Hugo, whereas Marine Atlan won Silver Hugo Best Director for La Gradiva.

It closed with American drama film Behemoth! by Tony Gilroy on October 25.

== Festival overview ==
This section sums up the main things taking place during the festival:

The full program including competition and non-competition titles, Tributes and Retrospectives was unveiled on September 17, 2026.

=== Physical Media Fair ===
On 17 and 18 October 2026, the festival hosted its first physical media fair. Visitors brought their own LaserDiscs, VHS tapes, DVDs, Blu-ray discs, and Ultra HD Blu-ray discs to swap with others. There was also a pop-up shop that sold movies from film distributors and local stores.

=== Black Perspectives 30th Anniversary ===
The festival will mark the 30th anniversary of its Black Perspectives program during the run of the festival. The celebration will include special tributes, screenings of past films, and a program honoring Marlon Wayans. Created in 1997 in partnership with Spike Lee, the Black Perspectives program was established to showcase the talent, achievements, and diversity of Black American filmmakers, as well as films by people of African heritage from around the world.

== Juries ==
The juries consists of the following members:

=== International competition ===
- John C. Reilly, American actor
- Carolina Cavalli, Italian writer-director
- Davy Chou, Cambodian-French filmmaker
- Ildikó Enyedi, Hungarian director
- Henk Handloegten, German filmmaker

=== New Directors competition ===
- Karla Badillo, Filmmaker
- Marya E. Gates, journalist
- Nicky Ni, programmer

=== Documentary competition ===
- Alina Marazzi, Italian filmmaker
- Curtis Miller, independent filmmaker and educator based in Chicago
- Bruno Santamaría Razo, Mexican filmmaker
- Katy Scoggin, American documentary director, producer, and camerawoman

=== OutLook jury ===
The OutLook jury will be awarding the Q-Hugo for LGBTQ+ cinema.

- Elizabeth Arnott, Music Box Films marketing and publicity head
- Annie Howard, journalist, historian and writer based in Chicago
- Stephen Winter, American film director

=== City & State Jury ===
- Malik Bader, Chicago bases director
- Liz Kaar, independent editor, director, and producer
- Texas Smith, Chicago-based, Arkansas filmmake

=== Live Action Short Film Competition ===
- Cortlyn Kelly, Chicago based writer, film critic, art appreciator
- Troy Lewis, award-winning editor based in Chicago
- Daniella Mazzio, award-winning journalist and critic

=== Documentary Short Film Competition ===
- Blair Barnes, conceptual artist from South Central Los Angeles
- Kim Joshua Min-soo, music and film critic, film programmer, and high school science teacher based in Chicago
- Fernando Saldivia Yáñez, Chicago-based Chilean filmmaker

=== Animated Short Film Competition ===
- Davis Cameron Chu, Chicago-based motion designer and independent filmmaker
- Alex Reis, Brazilian filmmaker
- Elizabeth Yoo, fine artist specializing in hand-painted key art for physical media

== Official Selection ==
The full slate of films and programs presented at the festival was announced on September 17, 2026.

=== Special Presentations ===
| English Title | Original Title | Director(s) | Production countrie(s) |
Opening Night
| Club Kid | | Jordan Firstman | United States |
Centerpiece
| Mouse | | Kelly O'Sullivan and Alex Thompson | United States |
Closing Night
| Behemoth! | | Tony Gilroy | United States |
Special Presentations
| Bitter Christmas | Amarga Navidad | Pedro Almodóvar | Spain |
| The Debut | | Jesse Eisenberg | United States |
| Elsinore | | Simon Stone | United Kingdom |
| Fatherland | Vaterland | Paweł Pawlikowski | Poland, France, Italy, Germany |
| Gentle Monster | | Marie Kreutzer | Austria |
| Ink | | Danny Boyle | United Kingdom, France, United States |
| The Liberation | | Guy Nattiv | United Kingdom, United States, New Zealand |
| The Life and Deaths of Wilson Shedd | | Tim Blake Nelson | United States |
| Paper Tiger | | James Gray | United States, Brazil |
| Ray Gunn | | Brad Bird | United States |
| Tender Loving Care | | Mike Leigh | United Kingdom |
| Wild Horse Nine | | Martin McDonagh | United Kingdom, United States, Chile |

=== International Competition ===
The following films compete for the Gold Hugo of the International Competition:

Indicates award winner in boldface

| English Title | Original Title | Director(s) | Production countrie(s) |
|---|---|---|---|
| All of a Sudden | Soudain / 急に具合が悪くなる | Ryusuke Hamaguchi | France, Japan, Germany, Belgium |
| Clarissa | | Arie Esiri, Chuko Esiri | Nigeria, United States |
| The Diary of a Chambermaid | Le journal d'une femme de chambre | Radu Jude | France, Romania |
| The Difficult Bride | | Rubaiyat Hossain | France, Bangladesh, Germany, Norway, Portugal |
| **The Dreamed Adventure** | **Das Geträumte Abenteuer** | **Valeska Grisebach** | **Germany, France, Bulgaria, Austria** |
| The Echo Chamber | | Andrea Pallaoro | Italy, Belgium |
| Everytime | | Sandra Wollner | Austria, Germany |
| Far From the Trees | Lejos de los árboles | Meritxell Colell | Spain, Peru, Italy |
| I See Buildings Fall Like Lightning | | Clio Barnard | United Kingdom, France, United States |
| La Gradiva | | Marine Atlan | France, Italy |
| Look Back | ルックバック | Hirokazu Kore-eda | Japan |
| Possible Love | 가능한 사랑 | Lee Chang-dong | South Korea |
| The Spiral | L'estranea | Paolo Strippoli | Italy, France, Belgium |

=== New Directors Competition ===
The following films compete for the Gold Hugo of the New Directors section:

| English Title | Original Title | Director(s) | Production countrie(s) |
|---|---|---|---|
| Al Baraneya | | Ashgan El-Hamus | Netherlands, Egypt, Belgium, Saudi Arabia |
| Clementine Orange | | Lisa Forslund | Sweden |
| A Common Story | Una storia | Anna Foglietta | Italy |
| Congo Boy | | Rafiki Fariala | Central African Republic, France, Democratic Republic of Congo, Italy |
| Dear Future Self | Erzähl Mir Dein Morgen | Ella Cieslinski, Nina Wesemann | Germany |
| Forever Your Maternal Animal | Siempre soy tu animal materno | Valentina Maurel | Costa Rica, Belgium, France, Mexico |
| Head to Head | Sar beh Sar | Ghasideh Golmakani | Iran, Germany |
| I'll Be Gone in June | | Katharina Rivilis | Germany, Switzerland, United States |
| **Mary Magdalene** | **Marie Madeleine** | **Gessica Généus** | **Haiti, France, Belgium, Luxembourg, Canada** |
| The Riverbank | A Margem do Rio | Enock Carvalho, Matheus Farias | Brazil, Germany |
| Saints | Sants | Mikel Gurrea | Spain; Italy |
| Six Months in a Pink and Blue Building | Seis Meses en el Edificio Rosa con Azul | Bruno Santamaría Razo | Mexico, Brazil, Denmark |
| What Belongs to Others | Cudze rzeczy | Grzegorz Dębowski | Poland |

=== Documentary Competition ===
The following films compete for the Gold Hugo of the Documentary Competition:

| English Title | Original Title | Director(s) | Production countrie(s) |
|---|---|---|---|
| 32 Meters | | Morteza Atabaki | Turkey, Iran, Qatar |
| Citizen Osama | المواطن أسامة | Ahmed Hassouna | Palestine, France |
| **The Illusion of an Everlasting Summer** | **La ilusión de un verano sin fin** | **Alessandra Sanguinetti** | **Argentina, United States** |
| Mariinka | | Pieter-Jan De Pue | Belgium, The Netherlands, Germany, Sweden |
| Sumo: Spirit Weighs Nothing | | Erik Shirai | Japan, United States, Denmark, United Kingdom |
| Tin Castle | | Alexander Murphy | Ireland, France |
| Tricontinental, Letter to Open in Case Of | Tricontinentale, lettre à ouvrir au cas où | Laura Cazador | Switzerland, Cuba |
| The Ultra Runner | | Mila Aung-Thwin | Canada |

=== Outlook ===
The following films competed for the Q-Hugo Awards, for films with LGBTQ+ themes; some of these competitors appear in other sections and are already listed in previous tables:

| English Title | Original Title | Director(s) | Production countrie(s) |
|---|---|---|---|
| Club Kid | | Jordan Firstman | United States |
| Elephants in the Fog | तिनीहरू | Abinash Bikram Shah | Nepal, France, Germany, Brazil, Norway |
| Elsinore | | Simon Stone | United Kingdom |
| I Rarely Wake Up Dreaming | Selten wache ich träumend auf | Isabelle Stever | Germany, Ukraine |
| The Man I Love | | Ira Sachs | United States, France |
| Nagi Notes | ナギダイアリー | Koji Fukada | Japan, Singapore, Philippines, Thailand, France |
| No Rest for the Wicked | | Kasper Kalle | Denmark, Faroe Islands, Iceland |
| Rose | | Markus Schleinzer | Austria, Germany |
| **Summer Drift** | **Virages** | **Céline Carridroit, Aline Suter** | **Switzerland, France** |
| Tangles | | Leah Nelson | Canada, United States |
| Trash Mountain | | Kris Rey | United States |

=== After Dark ===
| English Title | Original Title | Director(s) | Production countrie(s) |
|---|---|---|---|
| Castration Movie Chapter iii. Junior Ghosts—Premorphic Drift; a fragmentary passage | | Louise Weard | Canada |
| Corpus | | Corrin Evans | United States |
| HotSpring SharkAttack: Great Kyushu Showdown | Onsen Shark2: Kyushu Dai-Kessen | Morito Inoue | Japan |
| Mum, I'm Alien Pregnant | | THUNDERLIPS | New Zealand |
| Species | Sanguine | Marion Le Coroller | France |
| Vampire Hunter D: Bloodlust (2000) | バンパイアハンターD | Yoshiaki Kawajiri | Japan, Hong Kong, United States |
| Victorian Psycho | | Zachary Wigon | United Kingdom, Ireland |

=== Animate! ===
| English Title | Original Title | Director(s) | Production countrie(s) |
|---|---|---|---|
| Ana, en passant | | Fernanda Salgado | Brazil, Portugal, France |
| Cherry and Virgin | | Masanao Kawajiri | Japan |
| Iron Boy | Le Corset | Louis Clichy | France, Belgium |

=== Black Perspectives ===
| English Title | Original Title | Director(s) | Production countrie(s) |
|---|---|---|---|
| 14th | | Ava DuVernay | United States |
| Ben'Imana | | Marie Clémentine Dusabejambo | Rwanda, Gabon, France, Norway, Ivory Coast |
| Chocolate Babies (1996) | | Stephen Winter | United States |
| Clarissa | | Arie Esiri, Chuko Esiri | Nigeria, United States |
| Dao | | Alain Gomis | France, Guinea-Bissau, Senegal |
| Liz Here Now | | Sterling Macer Jr. | United States |
| Mary Magdalene | Marie Madeleine | Gessica Généus | Haiti, France, Belgium, Luxembourg, Canada |
| Once Upon a Time in Harlem | | William Greaves and David Greaves | United States |
| Three Colors: Pan-African | | Elijah Davis, Allison A. Waite, Tyler Holmes | United States |
| The Watermelon Woman (1996) | | Cheryl Dunye | United States |

=== City & State ===
| English Title | Original Title | Director(s) | Production countrie(s) |
|---|---|---|---|
| Ana the Cleaner | | Guy Bauer | United States |
| Ever After | | Frankie Nasso | United States |
| Finding Your Laughter | | Arlieta Hall, Brittany Alsot | United States |
| No Hands: The Wild Ride of the Schwinn Bicycle Company | | Daniel Clarke | United States |
| While We Are Here | | Reveca Torres | United States, France |

=== Comedy ===
| English Title | Original Title | Director(s) | Production countrie(s) |
|---|---|---|---|
| Bob and David Climb Machu Picchu | | Michael LaHaie | United States, Peru |
| Burgundy | | Michael Dweck, Gregory Kershaw | United States, France |
| Club Kid | | Jordan Firstman | United States |
| The Debut | | Jesse Eisenberg | United States |
| Everything Else Is Noise | Lo demás es ruido | Nicolás Pereda | Germany, Canada, Mexico |
| Wild Horse Nine | | Martin McDonagh | United Kingdom, United States, Chile |

=== Departures ===
| English Title | Original Title | Director(s) | Production countrie(s) |
|---|---|---|---|
| 9 Temples to Heaven | 9 วัด สู่สวรรค์ | Sompot Chidgasornpongse | Thailand, Singapore, France, Norway, China, Hong Kong, Indonesia, Qatar |
| Ben'Imana | | Marie Clémentine Dusabejambo | Rwanda, Gabon, France, Norway, Ivory Coast |
| A Day in the Life of Jo: Chapter Phaedra | Mia mera sti zoi tis tzo: kefalaio Faidra | Jacqueline Lentzou | Greece, Germany, France |
| Eight Bridges | | James Benning | United States |
| The Girl with the Leica | La ragazza con la Leica | Alina Marazzi | Italy, Germany |
| Isabel | | Gabe Klinger | Brazil, France |
| Josephine | | Beth de Araújo | United States |
| The Loneliest Man in Town | Wiener Blues – The Loneliest Man in Town | Tizza Covi and Rainer Frimmel | Austria |
| Love is the monster | Amor es el monstruo | Neto Villalobos Brenes | Costa Rica, Peru, Panama, Chile, Mexico |
| Nowhere to Lay My Eyes | 눈둘데가 없네 | Hong Sang-soo | South Korea |
| The Only Living Pickpocket in New York | | Noah Segan | United States |
| Sad Girlz | Chicas tristes | Fernanda Tovar | Mexico, Spain, France |
| Stand Up | | Mari Sanders | The Netherlands, Greece |
| Tell Everyone | Kerro kaikille | Alli Haapasalo | Finland |
| Will You Still Be My Friend | 日光 | Lu Po-shun | Taiwan; Singapore |

=== Documentary ===
| English Title | Original Title | Director(s) | Production countrie(s) |
|---|---|---|---|
| 14th | | Ava DuVernay | United States |
| Carl Sagan: We Are Made of Star Stuff | | Nanette Burstein | United States |
| A City in the Forest | | Lev Omelchenko, Nolan Huber | United States |
| Edward Said: Between Worlds | | Maiken Baird | United States |
| Going for Home | | Eric Simonson | United States |
| Musk | | Alex Gibney | United States |
| Rehearsals for a Revolution | خاطرات ایران | Pegah Ahangarani | Iran, Czech Republic, Spain |

=== Spotlight ===
| English Title | Original Title | Director(s) | Production countrie(s) |
|---|---|---|---|
| Being Heumann | | Siân Heder | United States |
| The Beloved | El ser querido | Rodrigo Sorogoyen | Spain, France |
| A Bit of Light | کمی نور | Ali Asgari | Iran, Switzerland, Italy, Canada, Turkey |
| Bunker | | Florian Zeller | France, Spain |
| A Good Little Soldier | Un bon petit soldat | Stéphane Brizé | France |
| I Play Rocky | | Peter Farrelly | United States |
| It Will Happen Tonight | Succederà questa notte | Nanni Moretti | Italy, France, Spain |
| Let Us Through, Dear Ancestors | Makikiraan po | Lav Diaz | Philippines |
| A Long Winter | | Andrew Haigh | United States, Canada, United Kingdom |
| Minotaur | Минотавр | Andrey Zvyagintsev | France, Germany, Latvia |
| Musk | | Alex Gibney | United States |

== Shorts Program ==
- After Dark Shorts: Siren Songs
- Animation Shorts: Altered States
- Best of CineYouth 2026
- Black Perspectives Shorts: Love with No Place to Go
- City & State Shorts: Homegrown Talent
- City & State Shorts: Journey Within
- Comedy Shorts: Anxious/Attachments
  - We Were Here
- Documentary Shorts: Fault Lines
- Drama Shorts: We’ll Meet Again
- Family Friendly Animation: Tender Bonds
- ICE OUT: Sawyer Avenue, Sunday Afternoon and A Month in Minnesota
- Outré: Deviants and Deviations

== Official awards ==
The jury formed by John C. Reilly, Ildikó Enyedi, Henk Handloegten, Davy Chou, and Carolina Cavalli conceded the following awards for films shown in International Competition:

- Gold Hugo: The Dreamed Adventure by Valeska Grisebach
- Silver Hugo, Jury Award: Everytime by Sandra Wollner
- Silver Hugo, Best Director: Marine Atlan for La Gradiva
- Silver Hugo, Best Lead Performance: Yana Radeva for The Dreamed Adventure
- Silver Hugo, Best Supporting Performance: Lotte Shirin Keiling for Everytime
- Silver Hugo, Best Ensemble Performance: The cast of La Gradiva
- Silver Hugo, Best Screenplay: Ryûsuke Hamaguchi & Léa Le Dimna for All of a Sudden
- Silver Hugo, Best Cinematography: Senzo Ueno for Look Back
- Silver Hugo, Best Visual Effects: The Spiral

The winners in parallel sections were as follows:

- Gold Hugo, New Directors Competition: Marie Madeleine by Gessica Généus
- Silver Hugo, New Directors Competition: What Belongs to Others by Grzegorz Debowski
- Gold Hugo, Documentary Competition: The Illusion of an Everlasting Summer by Alessandra Sanguinetti
- Silver Hugo, Documentary Competition: Tricontinental: Letter to Open in Case of... by Laura Cazador
- Gold Q-Hugo, OutLook Competition: Summer Drift by Céline Carridroit & Aline Suter
- Silver Q-Hugo, OutLook Competition: The Man I Love by Ira Sachs
- Special Mention: OutLook Competition: Six Months in a Pink and Blue Building by Bruno Santamaría Razo
- Chicago Award: Finding Your Laughter by Arlieta Hall & Brittany Alsot
- Audience Award for U.S. Feature: TBA

=== Artistic Achievement Awards ===
- Carrie Coon, American actress for The Liberation

Carrie Coon recipient of Artistic Achievement Aw

- Q-Hugo: Ira Sachs, American filmmaker for The Man I Love

=== Spotlight Award ===
- Andrew Haigh, English filmmaker for A Long Winter

=== Tour de Force Award ===
- Aunjanue Ellis-Taylor, American actress for Liz Here Now

=== Career Achievement Award ===
- Marlon Wayans, American actor, comedian, writer, and producer.
- Cheryl Dunye, Liberian-American film director, producer, screenwriter, editor and actress
