= Golden Leopard – Filmmakers of the Present =

Award given to a film at the Locarno Film Festival

Golden Leopard — Filmmakers of the Present
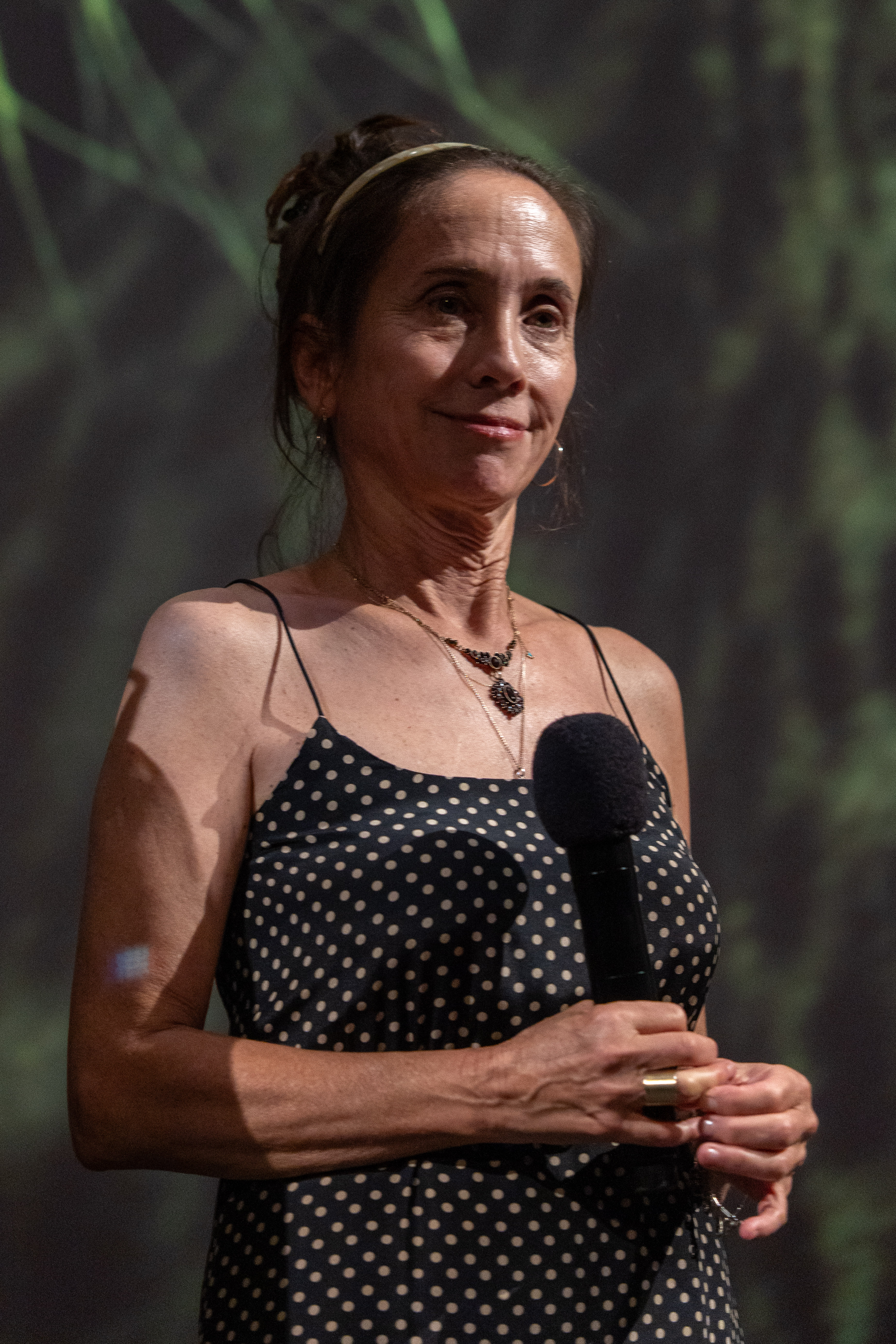
- 2026 recipient: Alessandra Sanguinetti
- Awarded for: Best film of the section “Filmmakers of the Present"
- Country: Switzerland
- Presented by: Locarno International Film Festival
- First award: 2006
- Currently held by: The Illusion of an Everlasting Summer by Alessandra Sanguinetti

Filmmakers of the Present - Golden Leopard (Italian: Pardo d'oro Cineasti del presente) is an award at the Locarno International Film Festival, presented by the Jury to the best film of the section “Filmmakers of the Present". It was first awarded in 2006. It is dedicated to emerging directors from all over the world and devoted to first, second and third features.

== Winners ==
Year	English Title	Original title	Director(s)	Production Country
2006	Hounded	Verfolgt	Angelina Maccarone	Germany
2007	Milky Way	Tejút	Benedek Fliegauf	Hungary
2008	The Fortress	La forteresse	Fernand Melgar	Switzerland
2009	The Anchorage		C.W. Winter and Anders Edström	United States, Sweden
2010	Paraboles		Emmanuelle Demoris	France, Egypt
2011	Summer of Giacomo	L'estate di Giacomo	Alessandro Comodin	Italy, France, Belgium
2012	Inori		Pedro González-Rubio	Japan
2013	Manakamana		Stephanie Spray and Pacho Velez	Nepal, United States
2014	Navajazo		Ricardo Silva	Mexico
2015	Thithi	Funeral	Raam Reddy	India, United States
2016	The Human Surge	El auge del humano	Eduardo Williams	Argentina, Brazil, Portugal
2017	3/4		Ilian Metev	Bulgaria
2018	Chaos		Sara Fattahi	Austria, Lebanon, Qatar, Syria
2019	Nafi's Father	Baamum Nafi	Mamadou Dia	Senegal
2021	Brotherhood		Francesco Montagner	Czech Republic, Italy
2022	Nightsiren	Svetlonoc	Tereza Nvotová	Slovakia, Czech Republic
2023	Dreaming & Dying	好久不见	Nelson Yeo	Singapore
2024	Holy Electricity		Tato Kotetishvili	Georgia, Netherlands
2025	Hair, Paper, Water...	Tóc, Giấy và Nước...	Nicolas Graux and Minh Quý Trương	Belgium, France, Vietnam
2026	The Illusion of an Everlasting Summer	La ilusión de un verano sin fin	Alessandra Sanguinetti	Argentina, United States
