= Nobody's Violence =

2026 drama film by Denis Côté

- Promotional poster
- French: Violence du corps de l'autre
- Directed by: Denis Côté
- Written by: Denis Côté
- Produced by: Guillaume Vasseur; Gabrielle Tougas-Fréchette
- Starring: Larissa Corriveau; Philippe Rebbot; Xavier Bergeron; Gabrielle Lazure; Pierrette Robitaille
- Cinematography: Vincent Biron
- Edited by: Terence Chotard
- Music by: Christopher White
- Production company: Voyelles Films
- Distributed by: h264, Heretic
- Release date: August 8, 2026 (Locarno)
- Running time: 118 minutes
- Country: Canada
- Language: French

Nobody's Violence (French: Violence du corps de l'autre) is a 2026 French-language Canadian drama film, written and directed by Denis Côté. Starring Larissa Corriveau the film follows a solitary woman, Mira, bound to others by a "death pact."

The film had its world premiere at the 79th Locarno Film Festival on August 8, 2026, in the Main Competition section, where it competes for the Golden Leopard.

== Synopsis ==
Mira is a solitary woman of few words. She travels the roads meeting desperate people with whom she seems to have forged strange death pacts. With no apparent destination, she meets Madeleine and Ludo, two free-spirited hedonists living deep in the forest. Taking a break from her missions and unsettled by a sudden encounter with an excessive and intriguing young man, she uses this stopover to question her wandering life and reassess her dark agreements.

== Cast ==
- Larissa Corriveau as Mira
- Philippe Rebbot
- Xavier Bergeron
- Gabrielle Lazure
- Pierrette Robitaille
- Eve Pressault
- Amélie Dallaire
- Christian Lapointe

== Production ==
Principal photography began in the Eastern Townships and Montreal on August 19, 2025, and concluded on September 16, 2025.

A second block of filming took place in January 2026.

== Release ==
Nobody's Violence had its World Premiere at the 79th Locarno Film Festival on August 8, 2026, and competes for Golden Leopard.

The film was screened for its North American Premiere at the 2026 Toronto International Film Festival in Wavelengths section on 11 September 2026.

On 4 October 2026, it will be showcased in Panorama section of the 2026 Vancouver International Film Festival. It will also screen as the opening film of the 2026 Festival du nouveau cinéma on 8 October.

== Critical response ==
For That Shelf, Courtney Small wrote that "as with several of Côté’s films, one’s mileage with Nobody’s Violence will depend on how willing you are to embrace its wild shift in directions. However, those open to letting him fully take the wheel will be in for a thrilling ride. A slow burn thriller that takes on a dreamlike feel, Nobody’s Violence finds invigorating life in freeing oneself from the grips of death."

== Accolades ==
Award	Date of ceremony	Category	Recipient	Result	Ref.
Locarno Film Festival	15 August 2026	Golden Leopard	Nobody's Violence	Nominated	
Locarno Film Festival	15 August 2026	Youth Jury Award	Nobody's Violence	Win	
Locarno Film Festival	15 August 2026	Special Performance Mentions	Xavier Bergeron	Special Mention	
