= Christian Lapointe =

Canadian theatre director

- Born: Quebec City region, Quebec, Canada
- Education: Conservatoire d'art dramatique de Québec; National Theatre School of Canada
- Occupations: Theatre director, playwright, artistic director, actor, teacher
- Awards: John Hirsch Prize (2010)

Christian Lapointe is a Canadian theatre director, playwright, artistic director, actor and teacher from Quebec. He first became known for staging several plays by the Irish writer W. B. Yeats, and is the author of a group of his own plays gathered under the title Cycle de la Disparition (Cycle of Disappearance). He is the founder of Théâtre Péril and the artistic director of Théâtre Carte Blanche.

== Early life and training ==
Born in the Quebec City region, Lapointe was admitted as an acting student at the Conservatoire d'art dramatique de Québec before training in stage direction at the National Theatre School of Canada, from which he graduated in 2005. In the autumn of 2001 he directed a first triptych of short plays by W. B. Yeats. Following a co-production with a theatre institution in Hanoi and the staging of a second Yeats play, he entered the National Theatre School's advanced directing programme in 2003.

At the age of 19, while working as a fire-breather, Lapointe was injured during a live television broadcast marking the first anniversary of Julie Snyder's programme Le Point J. The accident required skin grafts to his neck and torso and, by his own account, reshaped his relationship to mortality.

== Career ==
=== Approach ===
An heir to the symbolist tradition, Lapointe's writing for the stage borrows from performance art, is conceived from and around scenic devices, and verges on video installation. As a teacher he has developed a method centred on observable aspects of stage acting, aimed at thickening the performer's presence through the modulation of scenic positioning. Text and gesture are closely bound in his productions and may shift with the energy and attention of the audience, with particular attention paid to the relationship between stage and house, and between reality and fiction. His Petit guide de l'apparition à l'usage de ceux qu'on ne voit pas and Les Jours gris set out this approach.

Death is a recurring theme in his work, rooted in a preoccupation with inhabiting a body of finite duration. In Sepsis, the final instalment of the Cycle de la Disparition, six actors reflect philosophically on their existence from within a morgue.

=== Productions ===
Lapointe appeared as a performer in Le 20 novembre, directed by Brigitte Haentjens, a performance that earned him a nomination from the Association québécoise des critiques de théâtre; he also worked with Larry Tremblay on the staging of L'Enfant matière.

In 2013 he staged Peter Handke's Offending the Audience (Publikumsbeschimpfung). He removed the performers entirely, leaving synthetic voices to speak the text within a direct-cinema installation that showed the audience to itself and, midway through, replayed its own presence in reverse.

At the 2015 Festival TransAmériques he presented — and himself performed in — a piece drawn from the work of Antonin Artaud lasting close to three days and two nights.

His 2016 production of Maurice Maeterlinck's Pelléas et Mélisande at the Théâtre du Nouveau Monde recast the symbolist allegory through an audio-visual staging.

In October 2023 he staged Parents et amis sont invités à y assister, a drama in four scenes built around six stories, adapted from the book by the Saguenay author Hervé Bouchard, winner of the Grand Prix du livre de Montréal.

His work has been presented in numerous Quebec institutions as well as at the Festival d'Avignon, the Royal Court Theatre in London, the Schaubühne in Berlin, and on several occasions at the National Arts Centre in Ottawa, the Carrefour international de théâtre de Québec and the Festival TransAmériques in Montreal, in addition to presentations elsewhere in Europe, Asia and Australia.

=== Teaching ===
After teaching at the National Theatre School of Canada for close to eight years, Lapointe began a residency there as artist and teacher. He subsequently taught acting at the École supérieure de théâtre of the Université du Québec à Montréal until 2021.

=== Constituons! ===
In 2019, in partnership with the Institut du Nouveau Monde, Lapointe launched Constituons!, a project proposing that Quebec be given a constitution written entirely by citizens selected by lot and representative of the demographics of Quebec society — conceived as a test of theatre as a popular agora. It drew support from more than a dozen theatre institutions across Quebec as well as from Quebec academics. The resulting citizens' constitution was formally tabled in the National Assembly of Quebec on 29 May 2019 by the independent member Catherine Fournier. A documentary play of the same name was subsequently toured through many regions of Quebec.

=== Deepfake and moving-image work ===
In June 2022 Lapointe directed the British playwright Martin Crimp as the performer of his own play Not One of These People, Crimp's first stage appearance. For the production, Lapointe devised a live deepfake system animating GAN-generated avatars through facial recognition.

In 2024 he extended this interest with an experimental film made entirely by the same process, adapted from Head in Flames by the American author Lance Olsen. The film brings back the filmmaker Theo van Gogh and the painter Vincent van Gogh, adding the figure of van Gogh's killer to form a cinematic "oratorio" for three voices, following the structure of Olsen's book. Lapointe has described the work as an act of commemoration of the murder of Theo van Gogh in Amsterdam on 2 November 2004.

=== Music ===
Lapointe is the composer for the group LiY, alongside the Montreal creator Laurence Dauphinais (voice and melodic line) and the British playwright Simon Stephens (lyrics).

== Published works ==
- Trans(e), Montreal, Les Herbes rouges, coll. "Scène_s", 2010, 76 p. ISBN 9782894193037
- Anky ou La fuite / Opéra du désordre, followed by Petit guide de l'apparition à l'usage de ceux qu'on ne voit pas, Montreal, Les Herbes rouges, coll. "Scène_s", 2011, 117 p. ISBN 9782894193228
- C.H.S., followed by Sepsis, Montreal, Les Herbes rouges, coll. "Scène_s", 2014, 114 p. ISBN 9782894193938
- Constituons!, Montreal, Les Herbes rouges, coll. "Scène_s", 2019, 152 p. ISBN 9782894197196
- Les Jours gris, illustrated by Vincent Giard (after Lionel Arnould), Montreal, Les Herbes rouges, coll. "Scène_s", 2021, 84 p. ISBN 9782894197462

== Selected stage productions ==
- 2001: Le Chien de Culann (after At the Hawk's Well, The Only Jealousy of Emer and The Death of Cuchulain) by W. B. Yeats
- 2002: Hoi Sinh / Dichotomie
- 2003: The King's Threshold by W. B. Yeats
- 2005: Faisceau d'épingle de verre by Claude Gauvreau
- 2006: Axël by Auguste de Villiers de l'Isle-Adam
- 2006: La Nuit des calandrystes by Daniel Danis
- 2006: Shopping and Fucking by Mark Ravenhill
- 2007: C.H.S. by Christian Lapointe
- 2008: Vu d'ici by Mathieu Arsenault
- 2009: Anky ou la fuite / Opéra du désordre by Christian Lapointe
- 2009: Nature morte dans un fossé by Fausto Paravidino
- 2009: Limbes (after Calvary, Resurrection and Purgatory) by W. B. Yeats
- 2010: Trans(e) by Christian Lapointe
- 2012: Sepsis by Christian Lapointe
- 2012: L'Enfant matière by Larry Tremblay
- 2013: Offending the Audience by Peter Handke
- 2013: Oxygen by Ivan Vyrypaev
- 2013: L'Homme atlantique and La Maladie de la mort by Marguerite Duras
- 2015: In the Republic of Happiness by Martin Crimp
- 2015: Tout Artaud?!, after the work of Antonin Artaud
- 2015: Sauvageau Sauvageau, after the work of Yves Hébert Sauvageau
- 2016: Pelléas et Mélisande by Maurice Maeterlinck
- 2016: Les Beaux Dimanches by Marcel Dubé
- 2017: La Vie littéraire by Mathieu Arsenault
- 2018: Portrait of Restless Narcissism (PORN) by Nadia Ross and Christian Lapointe
- 2018: The Rest Will Be Familiar to You from Cinema by Martin Crimp
- 2019: Constituons! by Christian Lapointe
- 2022: When We Have Sufficiently Tortured Each Other by Martin Crimp
- 2022: Titre(s) de travail by Natalie Fontalvo, Lauren Hartley, Odile Gagné-Roy, Christian Lapointe and Marie-Ève Lussier
- 2022: Not One of These People by Martin Crimp
- 2022: We Are Shining Forever, after La Morte by Mathieu Arsenault
- 2023: Parents et amis sont invités à y assister by Hervé Bouchard
- 2024: Head in Flames by Lance Olsen
- 2024: Découronné.e.s by Herménégilde Chiasson, Céleste Godin, Georgette LeBlanc, Mélanie Léger, Jean-Philippe Raîche and Gabriel Robichaud
- 2025: Use et abuse, after L'Économie esthétique by Alain Deneault, co-created with Alix Dufresne
- 2026: Hiroshima mon amour, by Marguerite Duras
- 2026: Laarm de Ploers, by Christian Lapointe

== Awards and nominations ==
- 2007: Protégé, Siminovitch Prize, chosen by Brigitte Haentjens
- 2010: Winner, John Hirsch Prize, Canada Council for the Arts
- 2011: Nominee, Prix de la critique (AQCT), best male performance, for Le 20 novembre
- 2013: Winner, Bourse Jean-Pierre Ronfard, Théâtre du Nouveau Monde
- 2014: Winner, Prix de la critique (AQCT), for Oxygen
- 2015: Winner, Prix de la critique (AQCT), for Tout Artaud?!
- 2016: Finalist, Siminovitch Prize
- 2016: Winner, Prix de la critique (AQCT), for In the Republic of Happiness
- 2016: Winner, Prix de la critique (AQCT), for Sauvageau Sauvageau
- 2018: Winner, Prix de la critique (AQCT), for Portrait of Restless Narcissism
- 2019: Finalist, Siminovitch Prize
- 2019: Finalist, Prix de la critique (AQCT), for The Rest Will Be Familiar to You from Cinema
- 2022: Finalist, Prix de la critique (AQCT), for Titre(s) de travail

== Biography ==
In October 2023 Christian Lapointe staged Parents et amis sont invités à y assister, a drama in four scenes with six stories at the center, which earned its author, the Saguenéen Hervé Bouchard, the Grand Prix du livre de Montreal.
