= The Human Surge 3 =

- Spanish: El auge del humano 3
- Directed by: Eduardo Williams
- Written by: Eduardo Williams
- Edited by: Eduardo Williams
- Release date: August 9, 2023 (Locarno)
- Running time: 121 minutes

The Human Surge 3 (Spanish: El auge del humano 3) is a 2023 experimental film written and directed by Argentine filmmaker Eduardo Williams. It is a loose sequel to his 2016 film The Human Surge.

== Production ==
Filming for The Human Surge 3 took place in multiple countries, particularly in Sri Lanka, Peru, and Taiwan. The film has a cast of nonprofessional actors, many of whom are LGBTI people. They were cast from residents close to the shooting locations except in Sri Lanka, where a more widespread search was needed to recruit LGBTI performers.

After The Human Surge, Williams had made the 2019 short film Parsi, which was shot on a GoPro 360 and edited with a virtual reality headset. The Human Surge 3 was shot on an Insta360 Titan, a 360° camera.

== Release ==
The Human Surge 3 premiered at the 76th Locarno Film Festival.

== Critical reception ==
On the review aggregator website Rotten Tomatoes, 92% of 12 critics' reviews are positive, with an average rating of 6.60/10. For Variety magazine, J. Kim Murphy wrote that although the film "provides itself the space to wander and arrive at new insights, the detachment can sometimes come across as a restraint that betrays an overall adventurous spirit." Slant Magazine reviewer David Robb described it as "a bold deconstruction of the cinema image, an ayahuasca-inflected study of globalization, and a mind-numbing work of video art juiced up with haphazard technical gimmickry". In a review for Filmmaker magazine, Vadim Rizov remarked that the film was "Williams's first film recapitulating prior work rather than discovering new modes, but to be fair, Surge 3 is unsurprising primarily in relation to his own self-created universe."
