= Balmoral Hotel (film) =

2015 Canadian film

- Directed by: Wayne Wapeemukwa
- Written by: Wayne Wapeemukwa
- Produced by: Wayne Wapeemukwa; Matt Drake
- Starring: Angel Gates
- Cinematography: Shayne Zwickel
- Edited by: Wayne Wapeemukwa
- Music by: Cris Derksen
- Production company: Thousand Plateaus
- Release date: 2015
- Running time: 10 minutes
- Country: Canada

Balmoral Hotel is a Canadian short drama film, directed by Wayne Wapeemukwa and released in 2015. The film stars Angel Gates as a First Nations sex worker who dances along Hastings Street in Vancouver's Downtown Eastside, in a performance that gradually morphs into a political statement against colonization.

The film was named to the Toronto International Film Festival's year-end Canada's Top Ten list for short films in 2015. It subsequently received two Leo Award nominations in 2016, for Best Short Drama and Best Performance by a Female in a Short Drama.
