= Florin Șerban =

Romanian film director (born 1975)

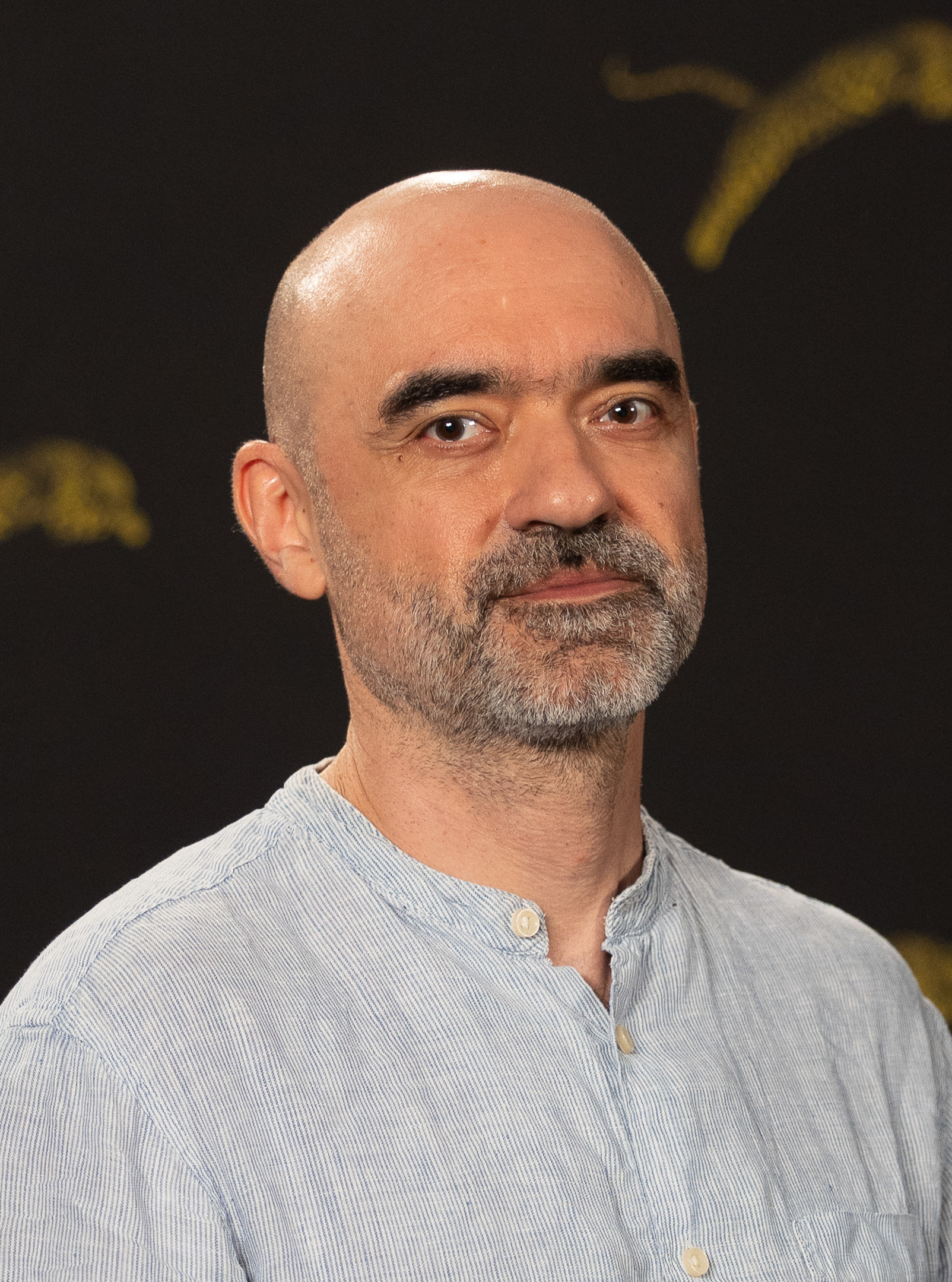
- Șerban in 2026
- Born: 21 January 1975 (age 51); Reșița, Romania
- Occupation: Filmmaker

Florin Șerban (Romanian pronunciation: [floˈrin ʃerˈban]; born 21 January 1975) is a Romanian filmmaker. A figure in the Romanian New Wave, he is most known for his social dramas films about contemporary society in the country.

For If I Want to Whistle, I Whistle (2010), he won the Silver Bear Grand Jury Prize and the Alfred Bauer Prize at the 60th Berlin International Film Festival. For You Don't Belong Here (2026), he won the Golden Leopard at the 79th Locarno Film Festival.

== Career ==
Șerban first feature film, If I Want to Whistle, I Whistle (2010), won the Silver Bear Grand Jury Prize and the Alfred Bauer Prize at the 60th Berlin International Film Festival. The film was also selected as the Romanian entry for the Best Foreign Language Film at the 83rd Academy Awards, but was not nominated.

Box (2015) premiered at the 50th Karlovy Vary International Film Festival and won the FIPRESCI Award. It was also presented at the 2015 Toronto International Film Festival.

His third film, Love 1. Dog (2018), opens The Trilogy of Love, three films about three ways of loving. It won the Cineuropa Prize and Art Cinema Prize at 2018 Sarajevo Film Festival. His fourth movie is Love 2. America (2020), the second part of The Trilogy of Love.

You Don't Belong Here (2026) had its world premiere at the main competition of the 79th Locarno Film Festival, where it won the Golden Leopard.

== Filmography ==
=== Feature films ===
Year	English title	Original title
2010	If I Want to Whistle, I Whistle	Eu când vreau să fluier, fluier
2015	Box	
2018	Love 1. Dog	Dragoste 1. Câine
2018	Love 2. America	Dragoste 2. America
2025	Hamlet	Cătun
2026	You Don't Belong Here	Nu e locul tău aici

=== Short films ===
- Mecano (2001)
- The Man Who Didn't Say a Thing (2016)
- Albocalmin (2024)

=== Only producer ===
- Unidentified - producer, 2020

== Accolades ==
- Silver Bear Grand Jury Prize at the 60th Berlin International Film Festival
- Alfred Bauer Prize at the 60th Berlin International Film Festival
- Festival International du Film Européen Cinedays - 2010 - Best producer
- Cleveland International Festival - Central and Eastern European Competition - 2010 - Best Eastern European Movie
- Santa Barbara International Film Festival - Eastern Bloc Competition - 2010 - Best Eastern European Movie
- Annonay International Film Festival - 2010 - Best debut
- Zlin International Film Festival - 2010 - Best debut
- Beaune International Thriller Festival - 2010 - New Blood Award
- Transilvania International Film Festival - 2010 - Best Romanian Movie
- Gopo Awards - 2011 - Best producer
- Gopo Awards - 2011 - Best debut
- Karlovy Vary International Film Festival - 2015 - Fipresci Award
- Sarajevo International Film Festival - 2018 - Cineuropa Award
- Sarajevo International Film Festival - 2018 - Art Cinema Award
- Locarno Film Festival - 2026 - Pardo d'oro

== See also ==
- Cinema of Romania
- Romanian New Wave
