= Wayne Wapeemukwa =

Canadian film director and screenwriter

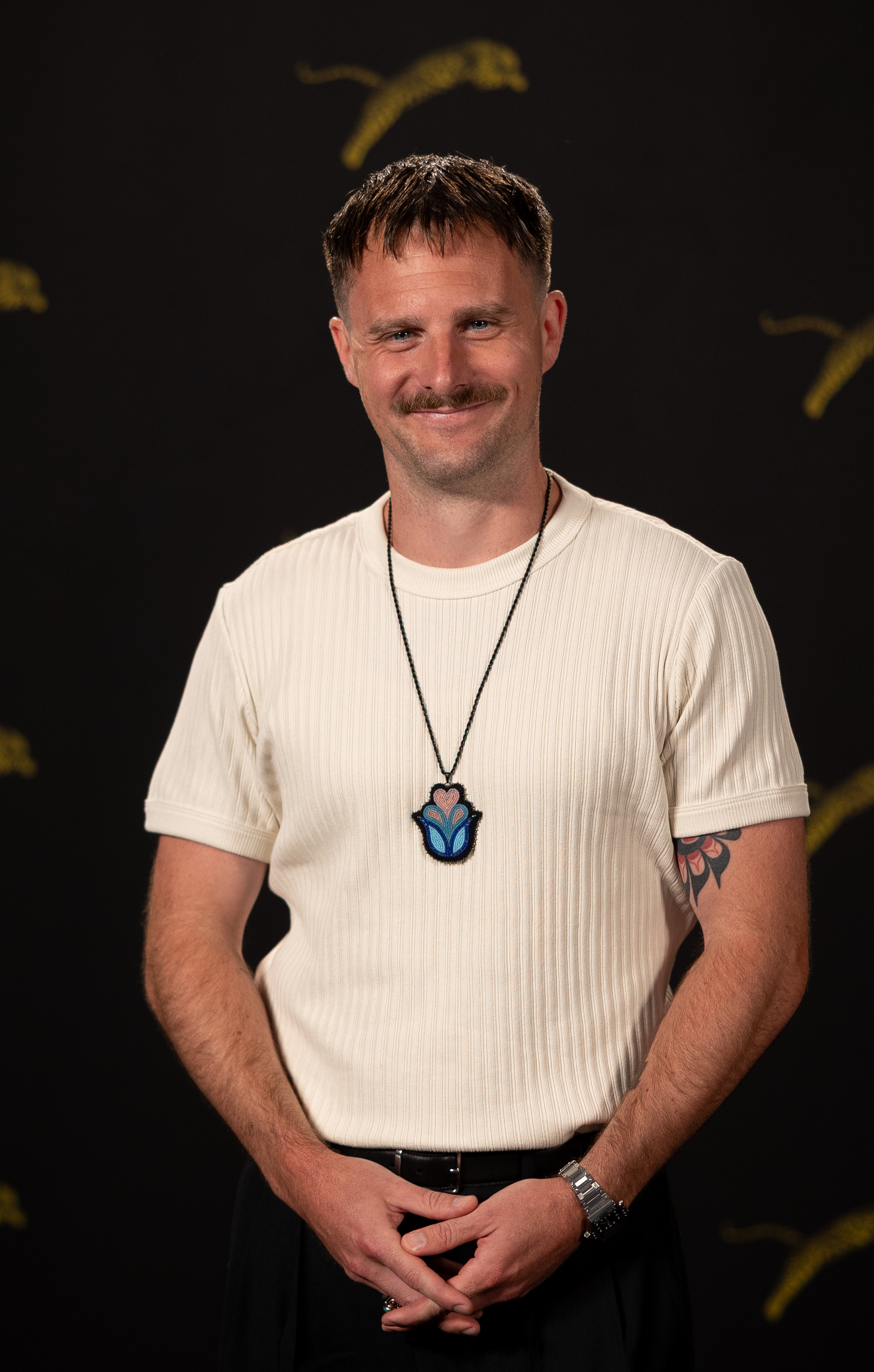
- Wapeemukwa in 2026
- Born: Vancouver, British Columbia
- Occupations: teacher, filmmaker
- Known for: Luk'Luk'I (Feature film)

Wayne Wapeemukwa is a Canadian film director and screenwriter of Métis descent from Vancouver, British Columbia. He is most noted for his feature film debut Luk'Luk'I (2017), which won the Toronto International Film Festival Award for Best Canadian First Feature Film at the 2017 Toronto International Film Festival and the Directors Guild of Canada's Discovery Award.

== Education and filmmaking ==
Wapeemukwa participated in his high-school film program and has been influenced and inspired, since childhood, by Chelsea McMullan. He graduated from the University of British Columbia with a bachelor's degree and is pursuing a Master's degree in Philosophy and psychoanalysis at the New School for Social Research.

Wapemukwa also works as a public-school teacher and research assistant.

Angel Gates is Wapeemukwa's muse, having first consulted on research for his short films and later starring, and being featured, in four of his documentary films.

His second feature film, Manhunt, is slated to premiere at the 79th Locarno Film Festival in August 2026, in competition for the Golden Leopard.

== Filmography ==
- Limp Clown - 2010
- Blood Job - 2010
- Street Spirit - 2011
- Spiritualized - 2011
- Foreclosure - 2013
- Weeper: Father - 2014
- Luk'Luk'I: Mother - 2014
- Balmoral Hotel - 2015
- Srorrim - 2016
- Luk'Luk'I - 2017
- Manhunt - 2026

== Awards ==
- 2015, Balmoral Hotel was named to the Toronto International Film Festival's Canada's Top Ten list for short films.
- 2017, Luk'Luk'I, Toronto International Film Festival Award for Best Canadian First Feature Film
- 2017, Luk'Luk'I, Directors Guild of Canada's Discovery Award
