= You Don't Belong Here (film) =

2026 Romanian drama film

- Official Poster
- Romanian: Nu e locul tău aici
- Directed by: Florin Șerban
- Screenplay by: Florin Șerban
- Produced by: Florin Șerban
- Starring: Adrian Văncică; Teodor Butănescu; Cristina Richter; Alex Conovaru; Izdrailă Janir
- Cinematography: Liviu Mãrghidan
- Edited by: Florin Șerban
- Music by: Marius Leftărache; Nikita Dembinski
- Production company: Fantascope Films
- Release date: 9 August 2026 (Locarno)
- Running time: 154 minutes
- Country: Romania
- Language: Romanian

You Don't Belong Here (Romanian: Nu e locul tău aici) is a 2026 Romanian drama film written, directed and produced by Florin Șerban. Starring Adrian Văncică as Marius Călimanescu, it follows a Romanian widow father who must face his son's alleged involvement in a murder in their small town.

The film had its world premiere in the main competition of the 79th Locarno Film Festival on 9 August 2026, where it won the Golden Leopard.

== Synopsis ==
Marius is the head doctor at a hospital in his small hometown. He is raising his teenage son, Ioan, by himself after his wife passed away. Marius is confident in his work, but he has no idea that Ioan secretly goes out at night with a group of masked boys who ride around town and damage cars. Everything changes for Marius when he finds out that the police now think his son might be involved in a murder.

== Cast ==
- Adrian Văncică as Marius Călimanescu
- Teodor Butănescu as Ioan Călimănescu
- Cristina Richter as Dana
- Alex Conovaru as Silviu Obădău
- Izdrailă Janir as Giani Feraru

== Production ==
The film was shot for 25 days in November and December 2025 in Bucharest and Reșița.

== Release ==
You Don't Belong Here had its world premiere at the 79th Locarno Film Festival on 9 August 2026, where it won the Golden Leopard. Subsequently it had its Regional Premiere at the 32nd Sarajevo Film Festival, where it competed for Heart of Sarajevo award in the Competition Programme - Feature Film on 20 August 2026.

It will also be showcased in the 'International Panorama' section of the 2026 Festival du nouveau cinéma on 10 October, In November, it will have its Spanish premiere at the 23rd Seville European Film Festival.

United Kingdom based sales company Reason8 has acquired the international sales right before its premiere at Locarno.

== Reception ==
Stéphanie Linda Maserin of Close-up: Stories of Vision at the Locarno Film Festival awarded the film three out of four stars. She described the film as "a powerful investigation into the responsibility of one generation towards the next," while suggesting that it may also examine the "definitive decline of the patriarchal model." Maserin praised the film's fluid pacing despite its nearly three-hour runtime, noting that most scenes were filmed in a single take. She also observed that the film leaves viewers with "weighty, problematic open questions."

== Accolades ==
The film was shortlisted for a nomination at the 39th European Film Awards in the Feature Film category.

Award	Date of ceremony	Category	Recipient	Result	Ref.
Locarno Film Festival	15 August 2026	Golden Leopard	You Don't Belong Here	Won	
Locarno Film Festival	15 August 2026	Special Performance Mentions	Teodor Butănescu	Special Mention	
Locarno Film Festival	15 August 2026	Europa Cinemas Label	You Don't Belong Here	Won	
Sarajevo Film Festival	21 August 2026	Heart of Sarajevo	You Don't Belong Here	Nominated	
Seville European Film Festival	14 November 2026	Golden Giraldillo for Best Film	You Don't Belong Here	Won	
Seville European Film Festival	14 November 2026	Prize for Best Art Direction	Bogdan Ionescu	Won	
