= 32 Meters =

2025 Iranian documentary film

- Promotional poster
- Directed by: Morteza Atabaki
- Screenplay by: Morteza Atabaki
- Produced by: Morteza Atabaki; Murat Ones
- Starring: Halime Sandal; Gonul Ugur; Abdullah Sandal; Yasar Akdas
- Cinematography: Morteza Atabaki; Zeynep Seçil
- Edited by: Morteza Atabaki
- Production company: Road Pictures
- Release dates: 14 November 2025 (IDFA); 19 August 2026 (Sarajevo)
- Running time: 84 minutes
- Countries: Turkey; Iran; Qatar
- Language: Turkish

32 Meters is a 2025 documentary film written and directed by Morteza Atabaki. A co-production between Turkey, Iran and Qatar, the film follows a group of women in a village in Anatolia, who want to take part in a shooting competition alongside the men.

The film had its world premiere in the Luminous section at the International Documentary Film Festival Amsterdam on 14 November 2025.

It will hold its Regional Premiere at the 32nd Sarajevo Film Festival on 19 August 2026, screening in the Competition Programme – Documentary Film 2026, and competing for the Heart of Sarajevo award.

== Summary ==
A village in southern Turkey has a long tradition of making rifles, and guns are part of daily life. Even so, the village is peaceful and has almost no violent crime. Halime, a fifty-year-old woman, stands out because she competes in a shooting sport usually dominated by men and refuses to accept the limits placed on her by local customs. When she starts teaching other women and dreams of forming a women's shooting team, 32 Meters shows how she tries to change ideas about power, respect, and who gets to shape their own story in a strongly male controlled community.

== Participants ==
- Halime Sandal
- Gonul Ugur
- Abdullah Sandal
- Yasar Akdas

== Release ==
32 Meters had its premiere at the International Documentary Film Festival Amsterdam on 14 November 2025 in the Luminous section.

It was selected in International Competition section of the One World Film Festival, where it was screened on 19 March 2026.

The film was also part of the 73rd Sydney Film Festival International Documentaries, where it was screened on 7 June 2026.

It had its Regional Premiere at the 32nd Sarajevo Film Festival, where it competed for Heart of Sarajevo award in the Competition Programme – Documentary Film 2026 on 19 August 2026.

The film was selected in International Competition of the DMZ International Documentary Film Festival for mid September 2026 screening.

It was screened in Documentary Competition at the 62nd Chicago International Film Festival on 17 October 2026.

== Accolades ==
Award	Date of ceremony	Category	Recipient	Result	Ref.
International Istanbul Film Festival	19 April 2026	Seyfi Teoman Best Film Prize	32 Meters	Won	
International Istanbul Film Festival	19 April 2026	Best Editing	32 Meters	Won	
Sarajevo Film Festival	21 August 2026	Heart of Sarajevo Award for Best Documentary Film	32 Meters	Nominated	
Asia Pacific Screen Awards	30 October 2026	Best Documentary Film	32 Meters	Nominated	
Chicago International Film Festival	25 October 2026	Golden Hugo (Documentary Competition)	32 Meters	Nominated	
