= Manhunt (2026 film) =

- Directed by: Wayne Wapeemukwa
- Written by: Anna-Lena Theobald; Wayne Wapeemukwa
- Produced by: Matt Drake; Nathan Drillot; Wayne Wapeemukwa
- Starring: Harris Lowe; Landon Tunold
- Cinematography: Jonathan Glendon
- Edited by: Coline Debray
- Music by: Daniel J.K. Ross
- Production company: Manhunt Productions
- Release date: August 6, 2026 (Locarno)
- Running time: 103 minutes
- Country: Canada
- Language: English

Manhunt is a 2026 Canadian drama film directed by Wayne Wapeemukwa, co-written with Anna-Lena Theobald and inspired by the 2019 Northern British Columbia murders. It stars Harris Lowe and Landon Tunold as Joey and Kit, two young men who try to escape their tedious lives by going on a road trip in the remote north of Canada, only for the trip to turn violent and murderous.

The film had its world premiere at the main competition of the 79th Locarno Film Festival in August 6, 2026, where it competed for the Golden Leopard. It had its Canadian premiere in the National Competition at the 2026 Festival du nouveau cinéma.

== Cast ==
- Bianca Foscht as Becca
- Dilara Foscht as Dani
- Harris Lowe as Joey
- Tricia K. Spooner as Kit’s Mom
- Landon Tunold as Kit
