= Prix du public =

The Prix du Public UBS
- Awarded for: Awarded by the Piazza Grande audience to the film presented at the Piazza Grande
- Country: Switzerland
- Presented by: Locarno International Film Festival
- First award: 2000
- Currently held by: Frank & Louis by Petra Volpe

The Prix du Public UBS is a prize assigned by the audience attending the Locarno Film Festival in Piazza Grande. Since the year 2000, it has remained the Festival's sole official prize determined by the Piazza Grande audience.

== Winners ==
Presented in partnership with UBS, it is the official audience award of the Locarno Film Festival since 2000.

- 1994: Senza pelle, directed by Alessandro d'Alatri
- 1995: Smoke, directed by Wayne Wang
- 1996: Microcosmos, directed by Claude Nuridsany and Marie Pérennou
- 2000: Hollow Man, directed by Paul Verhoeven
- 2001: Lagaan, directed by Ashutosh Gowariker
- 2002: Bend it like Beckham, directed by Gurinder Chadha
- 2003: Das Wunder von Bern, directed by Sönke Wortmann
- 2004: Hacala Hasurit, directed by Eran Riklis
- 2005: Zaïna, Cavalière de l'Atlas, directed by Bourlem Guerdijou
- 2006: Das Leben der Anderen, directed by Florian Henckel von Donnersmarck
- 2007: Death at a Funeral, directed by Frank Oz
- 2008: Son of Rambow, directed by Garth Jennings
- 2009: Giulias Verschwinden, directed by Christoph Schaub
- 2010: The Human Resources Manager, directed by Eran Riklis
- 2011: Monsieur Lazhar, directed by Philippe Falardeau
- 2012: Lore, directed by Cate Shortland
- 2013: Gabrielle, directed by Louise Archambault
- 2014: Schweizer Helden, directed by Peter Luisi
- 2014: The People vs. Fritz Bauer, directed by Lars Kraume
- 2016: I, Daniel Blake, directed by Ken Loach
- 2017: The Big Sick, directed by Michael Showalter
- 2018: BlacKkKlansman, directed by Spike Lee
- 2019: Camille, by Boris Lojkine
- 2021: Hinterland, directed by Stefan Ruzowitzky
- 2022: Last Dance by Delphine Lehericey
- 2023: The Old Oak by Ken Loach
- 2024: Reinas by Klaudia Reynicke
- 2025: Rosemead by Eric Lin
- 2026: Frank & Louis by Petra Volpe
