= Frank & Louis =

Upcoming drama film

- Directed by: Petra Volpe
- Screenplay by: Petra Volpe; Esther Bernstorff
- Produced by: Reto Schaerli; Lukas Hobi; Georgie Paget; Thembisa Cochrane
- Starring: Kingsley Ben-Adir; Rob Morgan; Indira Varma; Rosalind Eleazar; Rene Perez Joglar
- Production companies: Zodiac Pictures; Caspian Films
- Release date: January 25, 2026 (Sundance Film Festival)
- Running time: 94 minutes
- Countries: Switzerland; United Kingdom
- Language: English

Frank & Louis is a 2026 drama film which marks the English-language feature film debut of director Petra Volpe. It stars Kingsley Ben-Adir and Rob Morgan.

== Premise ==
A prisoner finds redemption when he starts helping fellow inmates who have health problems.

== Cast ==
- Kingsley Ben-Adir as Frank
- Rob Morgan as Louis
- Indira Varma as Dr. Watts
- Rosalind Eleazar as Trish
- Rene Perez Joglar as Julian
- Calum MacPherson as Barney

== Production ==
The film is written by Petra Volpe and Esther Bernstorff and directed by Volpe in her English-language directorial debut. It was initially in development in 2022, with Laurence Fishburne and Clifton Collins Jr. attached to the cast.

It is produced by Reto Schaerli and Lukas Hobi for Zodiac Pictures, with Georgie Paget and Thembisa Cochrane for Caspian Films. In 2025, distribution rights were bought for various European countries including Filmcoopi in Switzerland, Constantin Film for Germany and Austria, and September Film for the Benelux region.

Kingsley Ben-Adir and Rob Morgan lead the cast alongside Indira Varma, Rosalind Eleazar and Rene Perez Joglar.

Principal photography began on the film on 30 April 2025.

== Release ==
Frank & Louis premiered at the 2026 Sundance Film Festival, which was held between January 22 and February 1, 2026.

== Reception ==
On review aggregator website Rotten Tomatoes, the film holds an approval rating of 92% based on 24 reviews, with an average rating of 7.2/10.

=== Accolades ===
Award	Date of the ceremony	Category	Nominee(s)	Result	Ref.
Locarno Film Festival	August 14, 2026	Prix du Public UBS	Frank & Louis	Won	
