= Box (film) =

2015 film

- Directed by: Florin Șerban
- Written by: Florin Șerban
- Starring: Rafael Florea
- Release date: 7 July 2015 (KVIF)
- Running time: 93 minutes
- Country: Romania
- Language: Romanian

Box is 2015 Romanian drama film directed by Florin Șerban. Obliquely, it shows the struggles of two very different people from ethnic minorities in Romania and how they eventually find love together. It was screened in the Contemporary World Cinema section of the 2015 Toronto International Film Festival.

== Plot ==
Cristina, married mother of a young daughter, works as a stage actress. She is a member of the Hungarian minority of Romania. Rafael, a member of the Romani people in Romania, is a handsome teenager working in a car wash and hoping to become a boxer. In the street he sees Cristina, who projects a discreet sexiness, and takes to following her. She at length agrees to have a drink with him in a café, if he promises to leave her alone. He asks, if she had no husband or child, would she accept him?

She is finding life difficult, being belittled by an arrogant director at work and bossed at home by her husband. Rafael has been offered a place in the troupe of a self-important boxing promoter, but when put into the ring for his first fight is ordered to take a dive in the second round. While he is at the match, Cristina turns up at his house and his widowed grandfather eventually lets her wait. He does not get back till dawn, damaged mentally and physically, when she has gone.

The film ends with Cristina walking into a hotel from one direction, followed by Rafael from the other direction.

== Cast ==
- Hilda Péter as Cristina
- Rafael Florea as Rafael
- Bianca Mihai as Daria
- Marian Simion as Antrenorul
- Nicolae Motrogan as Bunicul
- Maria Fekete as Irina
- Orlando Chirvase as Leonard
- Sorin Leoveanu as George
- Robert Soare as Scundu'
- Narcis Romulus Dobrin as Buzatu
- Cătălin Mitulescu as Regizorul
