= The Green Eyes =

2026 French drama film

- French promotional poster
- French: Les Yeux Verts
- Directed by: Fanny Liatard; Jérémy Trouilh
- Screenplay by: Guillaume Laurant; Fanny Liatard; Jérémy Trouilh
- Produced by: Julie Billy; Carole Scotta
- Starring: Douae Butarbuch M’Zaouki; Sayyid El Alami; Anamaria Vartolomei; Arcadi Radeff; Omar Al Jbaai
- Cinematography: Victor Seguin
- Edited by: Tina Baz; Daniel DarmonTina Baz; Daniel Darmon
- Music by: Amine Bouhafa
- Production companies: June Films; Haut et Court
- Distributed by: Filmcoopi Zürich AG
- Release dates: 5 August 2026 (Locarno); 11 November 2026 (France)
- Running time: 118 minutes
- Countries: France; Belgium; Sweden
- Languages: French; Arabic

The Green Eyes (French: Les Yeux Verts) is a 2026 drama film directed by Fanny Liatard and Jérémy Trouilh, and co-written with Guillaume Laurant. A co-production between France, Belgium and Sweden, it follows the eleven-year-old refugee Chaya in Southwestern France, while her brother Nour suffers from resignation syndrome.

The film had its world premiere as the opening film of the 79th Locarno Film Festival on 5 August 2026.

== Synopsis ==
Chaya, an eleven-year-old girl, resides in a small village in the Landes region of France with her father, Rafi, and her older brother, Nour. After the family receives notice of eviction, Rafi departs abruptly, leaving his children without support. In the aftermath, Nour gradually enters a prolonged and unexplained sleep identified as resignation syndrome. Chaya attempts to revive him and begins exploring her own dreams in an effort to reach him.

== Cast ==
- Douae Butarbuch M’Zaouki as Chaya
- Sayyid El Alami as Nour
- Anamaria Vartolomei as Marion
- Arcadi Radeff as Benjamin
- Omar Aljbaai as Rafi, father

== Production ==
Filming took place from 26 May to 16 July 2025 in Nouvelle-Aquitaine and the South Region.

== Release ==
The Green Eyes had its world premiere at the 79th Locarno Film Festival on 5 August 2026, as the opening film of the festival.

Paris-based Kinology acquired the international sales rights of the film and pre-sold it to Cinart for Benelux region, Filmcoopi Zürich, (Switzerland), Chantier Films Turkey, and MegaCom Film for the former Yugoslavia region (Bosnia and Herzegovina, Croatia, Kosovo, Montenegro, North Macedonia, Serbia, and Slovenia).

The film will be theatrically released in France on 11 November 2026 by Haut et Court.

== Reception ==
Reviewing the film for ScreenDaily, at Locarno Film Festival, Amber Wilkinson praised the film for its atmospheric visual style and technical craftsmanship. She commended Victor Seguin's cinematography, noting the "majestic drone photography" and evocative camerawork "that feels in touch with the natural world, but also feels fable-like." Wilkinson also admired the film's immersive sound design. Criticizing narrative, Wilkinson opined that it was less successful than its visual ambitions. Albeit Butarbuch M'Zaouki delivered a compelling performance as Chaya, Wilkinson felt that the film's emphasis on imagery often overshadows its storytelling, with visual metaphors feeling "more manufactured than organic." She concluded that, despite its sincere emotional intentions, the film's "lightweight characterisation" and "hurried ending" make it "less affecting than it aims to be."

=== Award ===
Award	Date of ceremony	Category	Recipient	Result	Ref.
Locarno Film Festival	15 August 2026	Prix du Public UBS	The Green Eyes	Pending	
