= Far From the Trees =

2026 Spanish drama film

- Promotional poster
- Spanish: Lejos de los árboles
- Directed by: Meritxell Colell
- Screenplay by: Meritxell Colell
- Produced by: Mayca Sanz L-Higueras
- Starring: Angélica Castelló; Jose Luis López Cama; Teresita Sánchez; Caterina Ramirez Guallar
- Narrated by: Néstor Calvet; Rosa Maria Duran i Gili
- Cinematography: Julián Elizalde
- Edited by: Ana Pfaff; Meritxell Colell
- Music by: Angélica Castelló
- Production companies: Allegra Films; Exit Media; Animalita
- Distributed by: Sideral Cinema
- Release date: August 13, 2026 (Locarno)
- Running time: 117 minutes
- Countries: Spain; Peru; Italy
- Languages: Spanish; Catalan; Quechua

Far From the Trees (Spanish: Lejos de los árboles) is a 2026 drama film written and directed by Meritxell Colell. A co-production among Spain, Peru and Italy, it follows Adela, a Mexican artist, and granddaughter of Republican exiles, who continuing her grandfather's legacy takes a trip to Peru.

The film had its world premiere in the main competition of the 79th Locarno Film Festival on 9 August 2026, where it won the FIPRESCI Prize. It subsequently held its national premiere at the 74th San Sebastián International Film Festival on 18 September 2026, screening in the Zabaltegi-Tabakalera for the 'Zabaltegi-Tabakalera award'.

== Synopsis ==
Accompaning Lucho, her guide and translator, Adela, a Mexican sound artist, travels from the jungle to the Peruvian Andes. She follows the path once taken by her grandfather, a Catalan republican who lived in exile in Mexico, and creates a sound map of endangered languages. When she begins to fear death, her sense of reality starts to break apart, and her journey turns into a personal return to her childhood home.

== Cast ==
- Angélica Castelló as Adela
- Jose Luis López Cama as Lucho
- Teresita Sánchez as Paula
- Caterina Ramirez Guallar as Adelita

== Production ==
The film produced by Allegra Films, Animalita Films, and Exit Media was shot across two continents, with principal photography conducted in Peru, specifically in Cusco, the jungle and the Andes, and in Catalonia, encompassing the regions of Montsià, Terres de l'Ebre and Maresme, and the city of Barcelona. The film was wrapped up in March 2026.

The film was made with support from Barcelona-based botanical artist Paula Bruna and Peruvian multimedia creator Cecilia Paredes, and was filmed in both digital and 16 mm formats to depict Adela's memories and dreams. The lead performer, Angélica Castelló, who is also a Mexican electronic composer and sound artist, created the film's soundtrack as well.

== Release ==
Far From the Trees had its World Premiere at the 79th Locarno Film Festival on 13 August 2026, and competed for Golden Leopard. The film was also selected in the Zabaltegi-Tabakalera section of the 74th San Sebastián International Film Festival for screening on 18 September 2026. It was also showcased in Vitrina section of Filmfest Hamburg on 26 September 2026 and in the international feature competition of the 62nd Chicago International Film Festival on 19 October.

The film was screened for Japanese Premiere on 27 October 2026 in the Women’s Empowerment section of the 39th Tokyo International Film Festival.

It will compete in the International Competition of the 57th International Film Festival of India in November 2026.

The film will be released in Spanish theatres by Sideral Cinema on 11 December 2026.

== Reception ==
Writing for Variety at the Locarno Film Festival, Jay Weissberg described Meritxell Colell's film as a "deeply personal and contemplative drama" in which language and sound evoke memories of childhood. He praised the film's visual treatment, which combines 4K digital cinematography, Super 16 mm and archival material to convey the varied textures of memory. Weissberg praised Ana Pfaff and Colell's skills as editor in creating flashbacks meaningful. He commended production designer Anna Auquer for the detailed recreation of Adela's densely furnished family home. He also highlighted cinematographer Julián Elizalde's sensitive handling of light and his ability to integrate the contrasting visual qualities. He opined that the imagery of Toni and the young Adela lying on a bed covered with vines and grasses was "so mesmerizing" that "the eye wants to linger further."

== Accolades ==
Award	Date of ceremony	Category	Recipient	Result	Ref.
Locarno Film Festival	15 August 2025	Golden Leopard	Far From the Trees	Nominated	
Locarno Film Festival	15 August 2025	FIPRESCI Prize	Far From the Trees	Won	
San Sebastián International Film Festival	26 September 2026	Zabaltegi-Tabakalera Award	Far From the Trees	Nominated	

== See also ==
- List of Spanish films of 2026
