= Catherine Fournier =

Catherine Fournier may refer to:

- Catherine Fournier (Canadian politician) (born 1992)
- Catherine Fournier (French politician) (1955–2021)
