= The Human Surge =

- Promotional poster for The Human Surge
- Spanish: El auge del humano
- Directed by: Eduardo Williams
- Produced by: Violeta Bava; Rosa Martinez Rivero; Jerónimo Quevedo
- Starring: Sergio Morosini; Chai Fonacier; Domingos Marengula; Rixel Manimtim; Manuel Asucan; Irene Doliente Paña; Shine Marx
- Cinematography: Eduardo Williams; Joaquín Neira; Julien Guillery
- Edited by: Eduardo Williams; Alice Furtado
- Production companies: Bando À Parte; Ruda Cine; Un puma; RT Features
- Distributed by: Ruda Cine
- Release date: August 8, 2016 (Locarno)
- Running time: 97 minutes
- Countries: Argentina; Brazil; Portugal
- Languages: Spanish; Portuguese; Cebuano

The Human Surge (Spanish: El auge del humano) is a 2016 experimental film directed, written, shot and edited by the Argentine director Eduardo Williams. It was Williams' debut feature film, after having made a number of short features. The Human Surge is divided into three separate narrative and geographical segments: the first in Buenos Aires, the second in Maputo, and the third in Bohol.

Each segment follows a handful of characters, who are often seen loitering or drifting between spaces, such as workplace and home. The segments are linked with diegetic bridges involving digital communication. Williams has stated that he wanted to explore the sensation and feelings related to aimlessness and travel, and thereby "create a rhythm between excitement and boredom or surprise and depression." The characters depicted in the three segments are invariably poor, restless and on the search for connection with other human beings.

The film premiered at the Locarno Film Festival in 2016, where it won the Golden Leopard - Filmmakers of the Present. It was subsequently released at film festivals in Toronto and New York to critical acclaim. Critical comparisons were made with other filmmakers working in the slow cinema subgenre, which emphasises the durational aspect of the moving image, rather than its narrative qualities.

== Synopsis ==
In Buenos Aires, the 25-year-old Exe is waking up and getting dressed in his apartment. He wades waist-deep through a flooded neighbourhood to arrive at his workplace, a supermarket, only to be fired from his position. He subsequently spends time with his friends and family, loitering in urban spaces and visiting online sex chat rooms. They perform sex acts, like fellatio, on each other in front of a web camera for virtual payment.

The movie moves on to the next segment through the window of a Chaturbate website, in which a group of African teenagers in Maputo, Mozambique are also seen engaging in cybersex for money. The Mozambique characters are similarly unemployed and impoverished, and perambulate through the streets between odd jobs and social events.

A later scene shows a character urinating on an anthill, which functions as a diegetic segue to the film's third segment, when the camera burrows into the earth, following an ant until it arrives at a hand holding a smartphone in a jungle somewhere in the Philippines. A group of locals are shown bathing together and walking through the jungle, with particular focus on a woman looking to charge her cellphone. Finally, the film moves into a technological factory in Bohol, where tablet computers are made on an assembly line. The last words are spoken by a machine, repeatedly saying "Okay."

== Production ==
Trailer for The Human Surge

Williams had made six short films before his feature debut The Human Surge, in which he had experimented with different video formats and textures. In the short films Pude ver un Puma (eng. Could See a Puma, 2011) and Tôi quên rôi! (eng. I forgot!, 2014), he and his usual cinematographers Joaquin Neira and Julien Guillery experimented with various aesthetic strategies—notably the use of long, handheld tracking shots (often described as "floating" and "restless"), amateur photography, as well as elliptical storytelling—which they also used in The Human Surge.

For The Human Surge, Williams used three different video formats, one for each segment: the Argentine segment was shot on 16 mm film, the Mozambique part with a Blackmagic pocket camera—subsequently recaptured in Super 16 from a computer monitor, and the final Philippine sequence on a digital RED camera. In the Mozambique segment, Williams operated the camera himself, considering it "so small," whereas in the two other segments he was helped by several assistants.

Williams had regularly employed a domestic Argentine setting in his first short films. However, in the latest shorts—That I'm Falling? (2013) and I forgot! (2014)—he opted for different locales, Sierra Leone and Vietnam, respectively. Having rarely traveled abroad as a young man, Williams was struck by the beauty of foreign languages, and wanted to use them in a filmic context. He eventually also discovered a charm in his own vernacular, spoken Spanish.

== Analysis ==
The film has been analysed for its commonalities with other entries in Williams' oeuvre, most notably the themes of alienation in the internet age, and how modern technology creates distance between people.

"My brain and practice have been transformed by technology. For example, by the video games that I played when I was young. In video games, you have these different levels that you advance to, moving through multiple spaces. And then the chats—at many points in my life, it seemed like online chatting was my only means of communication. It is a different way of speaking, of connecting. I didn’t think of it at first, but this is why I structure my films the way I do. It’s about how I see and relate to the world."

—Eduardo Williams, 2016.

Picking up on the theme of internet psychology, critic Nick Pinkerton noted the film's ambition in addressing "the enormous cognitive earthquake represented by the internet's colonization of daily life". He considered the transition into the anthill to be reminiscent of the opening scene in David Lynch's Blue Velvet, where the camera similarly dives "beneath the manicured lawn" and into the ground.

Several critics have found certain organizational elements within the film and, by extension, Williams' oeuvre. Leo Goldsmith of Cinema Scope has called Williams' work a "cinema of vectors", noting the constant geographical and ontological displacement throughout his films. Ambulatory passages are frequent in Williams' cinema, where (often young) characters are seen moving through dilapidated apartments, supermarkets, areas of urban decay, jungles, rocky hillsides and caves. The novelty in The Human Surge lies in its movement from literal/concrete places (anthill) to abstract/figurative places (internet).

In the final segment, Williams wanted to address the "illusion of escape", by moving to the natural, verdant greens of the Filipino jungle, only to pull back into a machine-filled factory, which he found to be a "very strange" and "very digital place".

Serbo-Croatian filmmaker Iva Radivojevic compared Williams' film to Lucrecia Martel's La Ciénaga (2001, eng. 'The Swamp'). Beyond both being feature debuts from Argentinian filmmakers, Radivojevic found The Human Surge to be starting "in a kind of swamp" and sharing a "mystical quality" with Martel's film, causing the spectator to be "injected into a kind of vacuum of time".

When the movie was shown at the Maryland Film Festival, programmer Eric Allen Hatch invoked the genre called slow cinema, citing filmmakers such as Andrei Tarkovsky, Lisandro Alonso, Harmony Korine and Gus van Sant, who also use the camera to depict the passing of time through the frame. In an interview with the director for Filmmaker Magazine, critic Vadim Rizov picked up on that theme, and considered Hungarian filmmaker Béla Tarr as an important influence on the film's long tracking shots, which follows characters moving through space. He also mentioned van Sant, finding the handheld camera to be suggestive of "the physical foot leather fueling the camerawork."

== Reception ==
The Human Surge premiered at the Locarno Film Festival to critical acclaim. It won the main prize in the section "Filmmakers of the Present" at the festival, the jury of which included Italian giallo director Dario Argento.

"No film of the 2010s came closer to the texture of contemporary lived experience than Eduardo Williams’s The Human Surge, which captures a mode of apprehending, moving through, and relating to the world—ambivalently connected, hyperalert yet distractible—that is absolutely of the moment. (This most termite-like of films also happens to include one bravura transition sequence involving a pissed-on anthill.)"

—Dennis Lim, film critic and programmer, 2020.

Nick Pinkerton of Artforum lauded Williams for delivering a film "without an instruction manual meant to clear up any potential confusion." He was also impressed by the "bucolic natural beauty" of the film, finding the experience of watching it to be "a headlong dive into the rich, knotty, sticky undergrowth amid a proliferation of tidy, well-lit paths".

Some critics were less enthusiastic about the film. Jessica Kiang panned the film for Variety, claiming that while Williams' "formal rigor is to be admired", the humans in the film are "little more than microbes in the petri dish [of the filmmakers'] "formalist experiment." Kiang concluded that the film is, "a victim of its own effectiveness: It's rigorous, rarefied, and utterly remote". Carson Lund of Slant Magazine was also critical of the feature, considering it to be easily mistaken for "a particularly interminable YouTube video".

The film was listed on several best-of-the-year lists for both 2016 and 2017, due to different release dates. It was considered the second best film of 2017 by the online film magazine Reverse Shot, a publication of the Museum of the Moving Image in New York. Editor Jeff Reichert noted its "shape-shifting" qualities and compared it to the works of Thai directors Apichatpong Weerasethakul and Anocha Suwichakornpong (the latter's By the Time It Gets Dark was listed as number 8 on the same list), which he lauded for "allowing themselves to do whatever, whenever they please." He concluded his entry by calling The Human Surge "the most laid-back movie of grand ambition to come along in some time."
