= Eduardo Williams =

Argentine film director (born 1987)

Eduardo "Teddy" Williams
- Born: 1987 (age 38–39); Buenos Aires
- Education: Universidad del Cine
- Occupation: Film director
- Years active: 2010–present
- Notable work: The Human Surge

Eduardo "Teddy" Williams (born 1987) is an Argentine film director. He first studied at Universidad del Cine in Buenos Aires, and then in Fresnoy, France, under the tutorship of Portuguese director Miguel Gomes. Williams works within an avant-garde/experimental tradition, and has made the feature film The Human Surge, in addition to a number of short films. His works have been presented at film festivals such as Cannes, Locarno, Toronto and New York. He frequently works with his fellow countryman actor Nahuel Pérez Biscayart.

== Pledge ==
In September 2025, he signed an open pledge with Film Workers for Palestine pledging not to work with Israeli film institutions "that are implicated in genocide and apartheid against the Palestinian people."

== Filmography ==
- Tan atentos [So Attentive] (2011, 8 min.)
- Could See a Puma [Pude ver un Puma] (2011, 18 min.)
- Alguien los vio [They were seen] (2011, 17 min.)
- The Sound of the Stars Dazes Me [El ruido de las estrellas me aturde] (2012, 20 min.)
- That I’m Falling? [Que je tombe tout le temps?] (2013, 15 min.)
- I forgot! [Tôi quên roi!] (2014, 26 min.)
- The Human Surge [El auge del humano] (2016, 97 min.)
- Parsi (2018)
- No es (2019, 20 min.)
- The Human Surge 3 [El auge del humano 3] (2023, 121 min.)
