= Mohanad Yaqubi =

Yaqubi in 2026

Mohanad Yaqubi is a Palestinian film director and producer.

As a child, Yaqubi's family moved between Kuwait, Jordan, Egypt, Libya, Gaza and the West Bank. He studied film at Goldsmith’s College in London and moved to Ghent, Belgium in 2017. He works as a researcher at the Royal Academy of Fine Arts of Ghent and is the public programmer of the Palestine Film Institute.

His family's house in Gaza was destroyed by bombing in April 2024.

His 2025 film Revolutionaries Never Die examines the work of Lebanese filmmaker Jocelyne Saab. The film's title is inspired by a quotation from George Habash.

== Films ==
- Off Frame AKA Revolution Until Victory (2015)
- R21 AKA Restoring Solidarity (2022)
- Life is Beautiful: A Letter to Gaza (2023, executive producer)
- Revolutionaries Never Die (2025)
