= Festival TransAmériques =

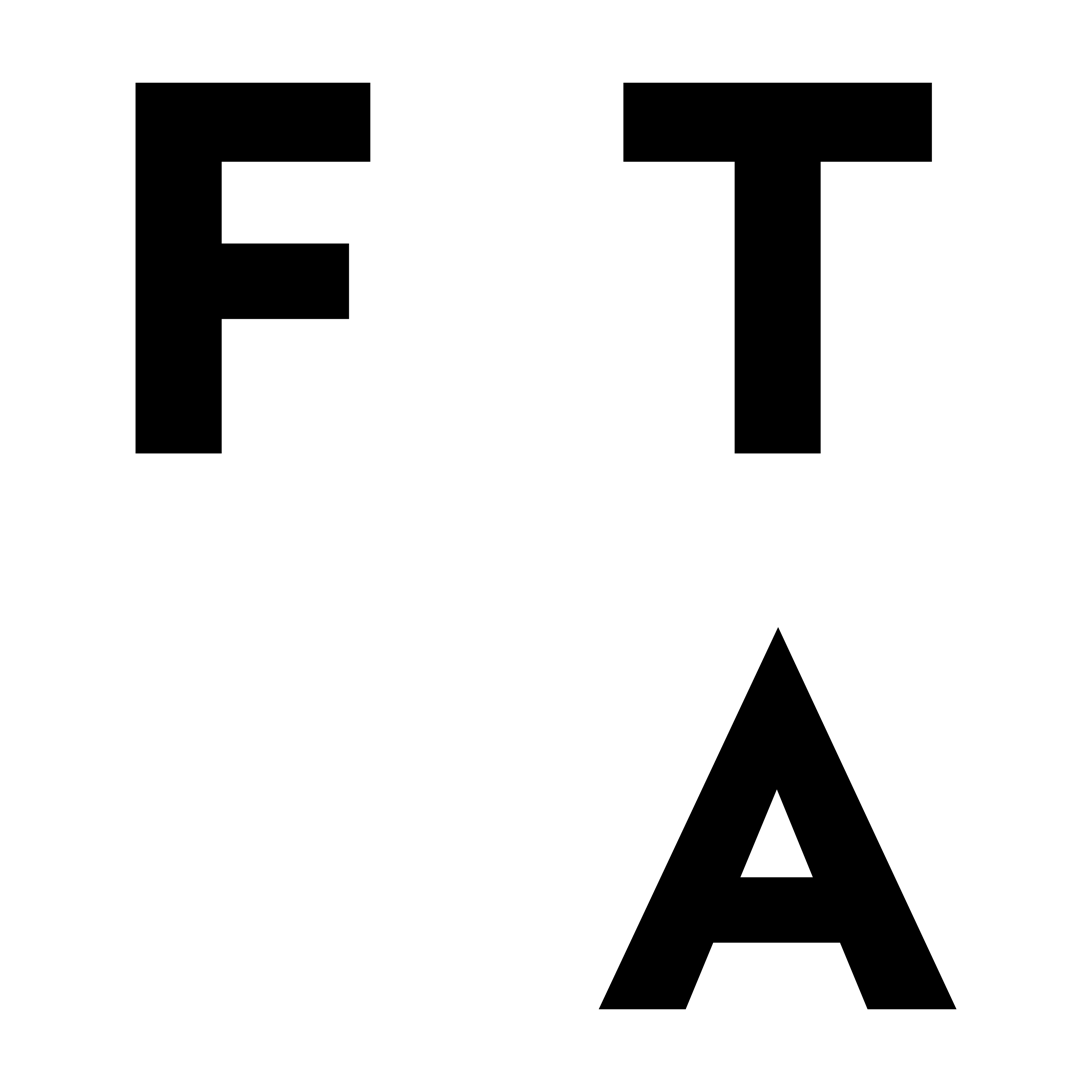

The Festival TransAmériques (FTA) is an annual dance and theater festival held in Montreal, Quebec, Canada. It has been described as "the biggest performing arts festival in North America".
