= The Illusion of an Everlasting Summer =

2026 documentary film by Alessandra Sanguinetti

- Spanish: La ilusión de un verano sin fin
- Directed by: Alessandra Sanguinetti
- Produced by: Julia Solomonoff
- Cinematography: Alessandra Sanguinetti
- Edited by: Andrés Tambornino
- Production companies: Mubi; Impact Partners
- Distributed by: Mubi
- Release date: August 8, 2026 (Locarno)
- Running time: 94 minutes
- Countries: United States; Argentina
- Language: Spanish

The Illusion of an Everlasting Summer (Spanish: La ilusión de un verano sin fin) is a 2026 documentary film directed by Alessandra Sanguinetti. A co-production of the United States and Argentina, it follows two cousins over the course of 25 years in the Argentine Pampas.

The film had its world premiere in the Filmmakers of the Present section of the 79th Locarno Film Festival on August 8, 2026, where it won the Golden Leopard – Filmmakers of the Present.

== Premise ==
Two inseparable cousins grow up over the course of 25 years in the Argentine Pampas.

== Production ==
Mubi co-financed the film alongside Impact Partners.

== Release ==
The film had its world premiere at the 79th Locarno Film Festival on August 8, 2026. It will have its North American premiere at the 53rd Telluride Film Festival on September 5.
