= Meritxell Colell =

Spanish director

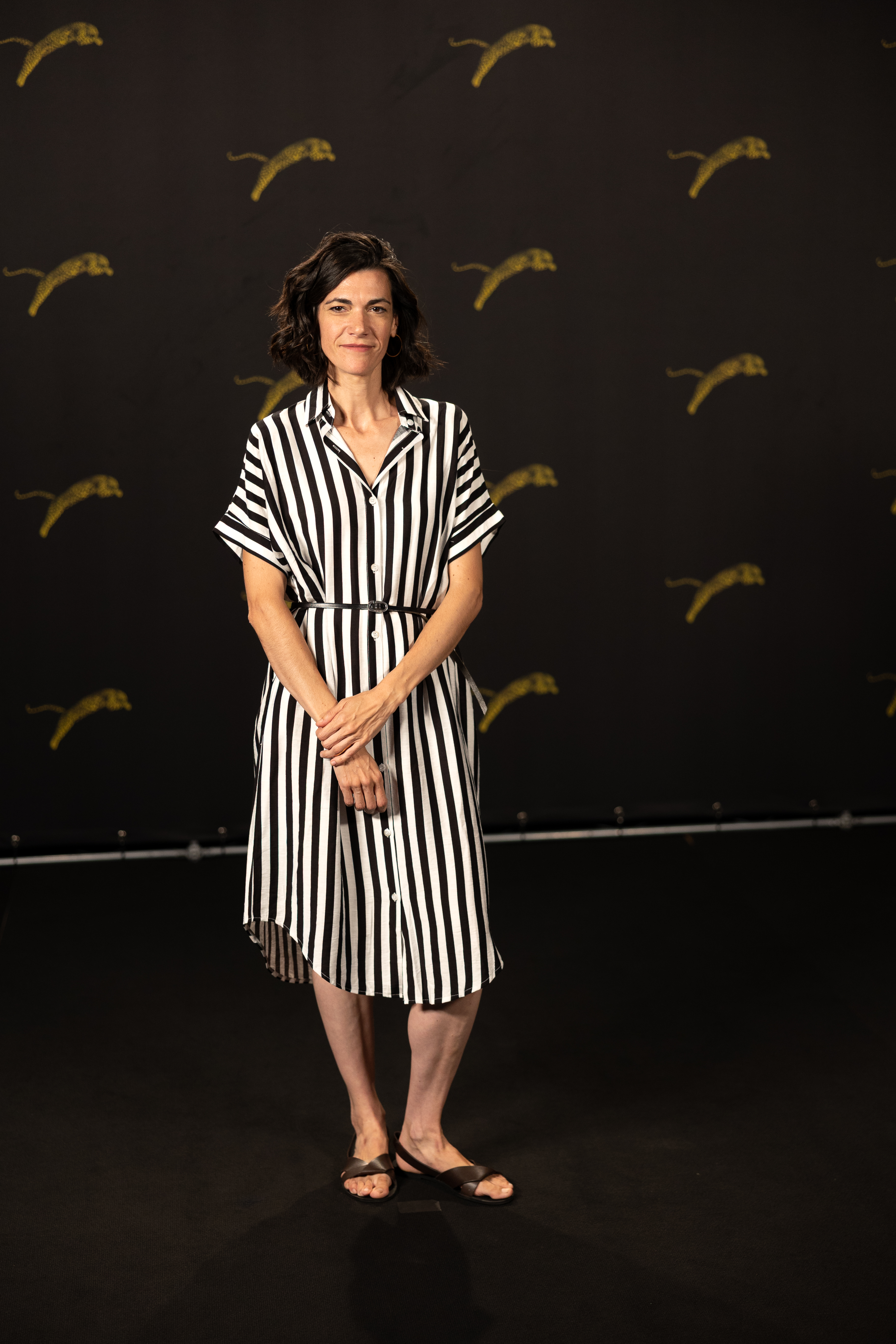
- Colell in 2026
- Born: Meritxell Colell Aparicio; 1983 (age 42–43); Barcelona, Catalonia, Spain
- Education: Pompeu Fabra University; University of Buenos Aires
- Occupations: Film director; screenwriter
- Years active: 2004–present
- Website: http://meritxellcolell.com/

Meritxell Colell Aparicio (born 1983) is a Spanish director.

== Biography ==
Meritxell Colell Aparicio graduated from Audiovisual Communication degree at Pompeu Fabra University in Barcelona. She studied cinema at the Universidad del Cine, en Buenos Aires. She started working as a film editor.

Since 2007, she has been making documentaries, notably for the Joan Miró Foundation. She also teaches cinema. She is a member of Cinema in Progress, a film education project, which also includes Carla Simón, Jonás Trueba and Mercedes Álvarez.

In 2018, she directed her first feature film, Con el viento, which is presented in competition at the Berlinale 2018 in the Forum section.

Meritxell Colell Aparicio is a part of the new generation of Spanish filmmaker. She is selected by the Cinéfondation to present her film at L'Atelier during the Cannes Festival.

== Filmography ==
- 2005: Barcelona-París-Barcelona (documentary)
- 2006: Manuscrit a la ciutat (documentary)
- 2014: Arquitecturas en silencio, dialogue between Antoni Bonet and Le Corbusier (documentary)
- 2008: Remembering Buenos Aires (documentary)
- 2018: Con el viento (Face au vent), Polar Star Film
- 2026: Far From the Trees (It had world premiere in the main competition of the Locarno Film Festival on 9 August 2026, where it won the FIPRESCI Prize.)
