= Petra Volpe =

Swiss screenwriter and film director (born 1970)

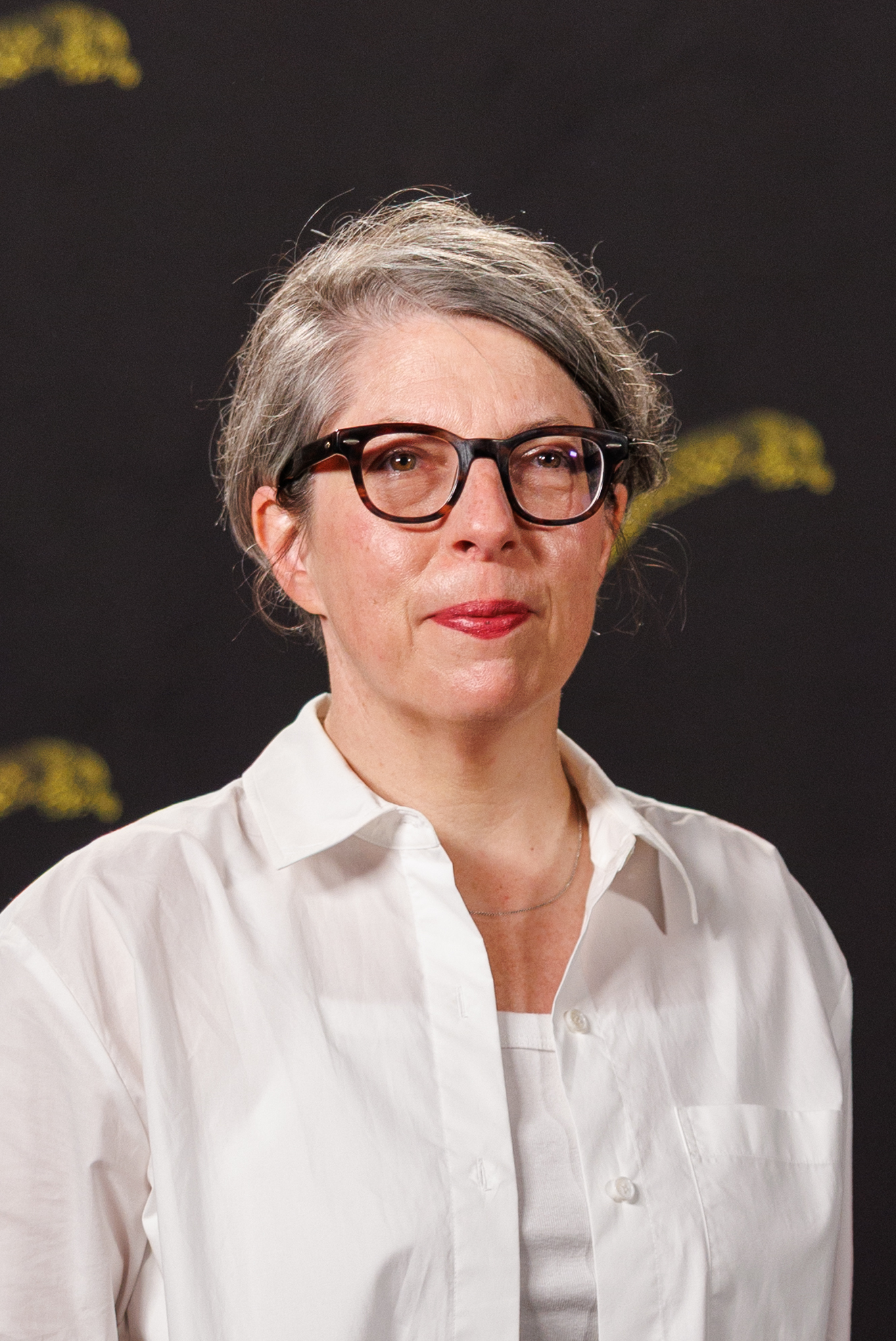
- Volpe in 2026
- Born: Petra Biondina Volpe; 6 August 1970 (age 56); Suhr, Aargau, Switzerland
- Occupations: Screenwriter; film director
- Years active: 2003–present

Petra Biondina Volpe (born 6 August 1970) is a Swiss screenwriter and film director. She is best known for directing The Divine Order.

In 2025, she directed Late Shift (Heldin), a Switzerland, Germany co-production film selected at the 75th Berlin International Film Festival in Berlinale Special Gala section, which will have its World premiere in February 2025 and later will be released on 27 February 2025 in Swiss theaters.

Filming began in April 2025 on Volpe's English-language debut film, with the working title Frank & Louis, starring Kingsley Ben-Adir.
