= Alessandra Sanguinetti =

American photographer (born 1968)

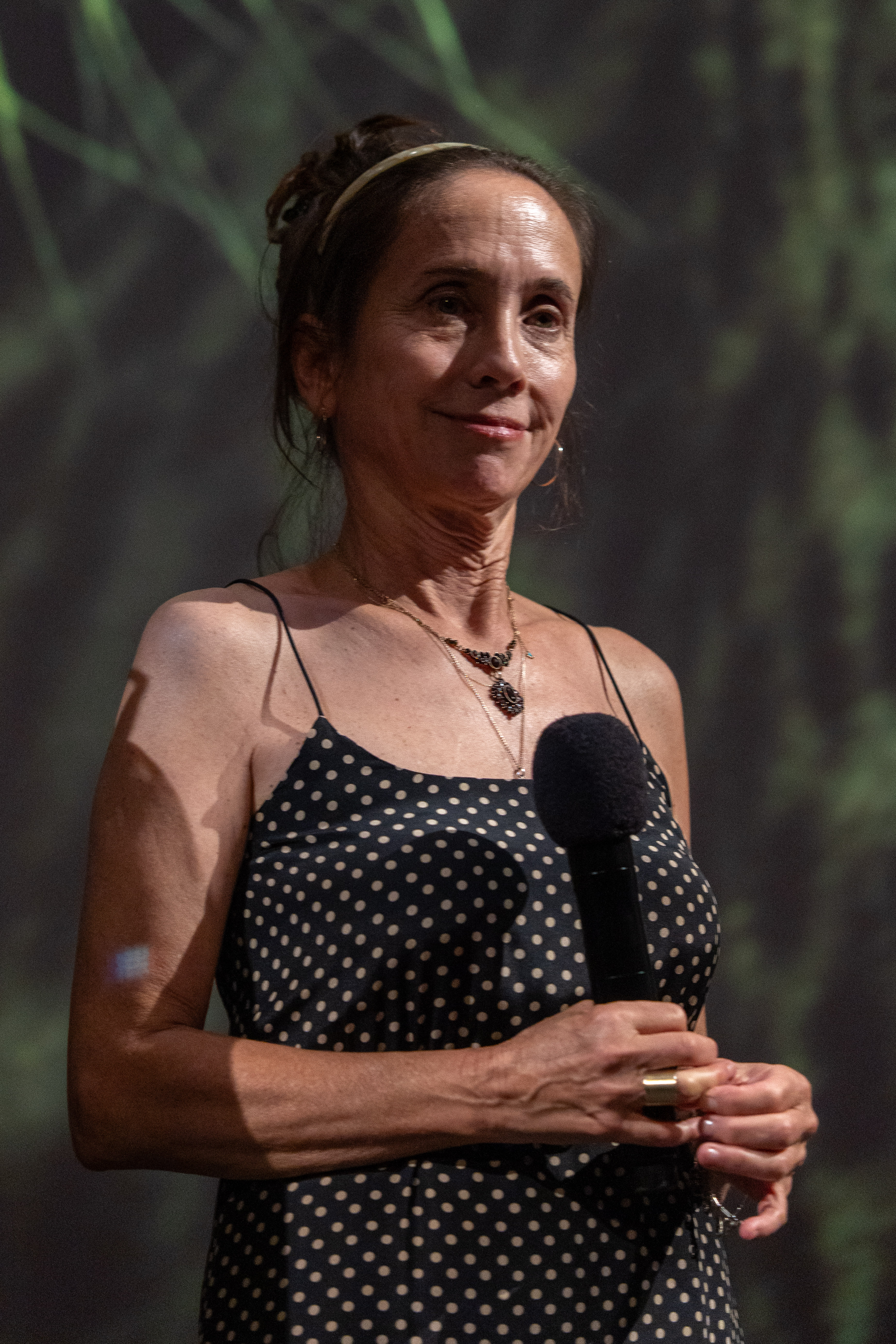
- Sanguinetti in 2026
- Born: 1968 (age 57–58); New York
- Known for: photographer
- Website: alessandrasanguinetti.info

Alessandra Sanguinetti (born 1968) is an American photographer. Sanguinetti is a member of Magnum Photos and has received a Guggenheim Fellowship.

== Life and work ==
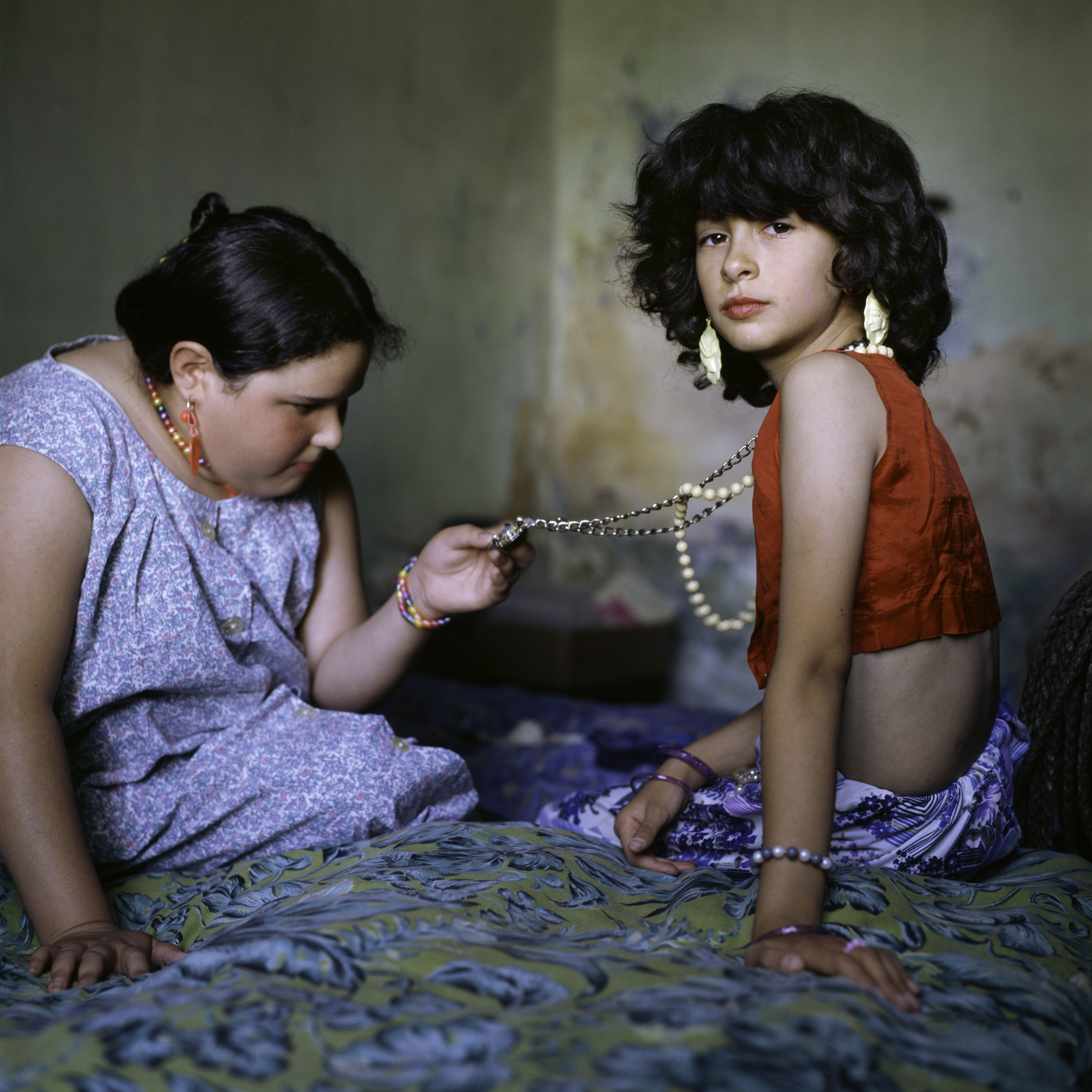
El Collar/The Necklace, 1999, from The Adventures of Guille and Belinda and the Enigmatic Meaning of their dreams.

Born in New York City, Sanguinetti moved to Argentina at the age of two and lived there until 2003. Currently, she lives in California.

Her main bodies of work include The Adventures of Guille and Belinda and the Enigmatic Meaning of their dreams (2010) and The Adventures of Guille and Belinda and The Illusion of an Everlasting Summer (2020), a more than twenty year long documentary photography project about two cousins as they grow up in the countryside of Buenos Aires; On the Sixth Day (2005), which explores the cycle of life and death through farm animals' lives; Sorry Welcome (2013), a meditative journal on her family life; and Le Gendarme sur la Colline (2017), an intuitive, lyrical journey through France; and Some Say Ice (2022), a luminous and unnerving book on death and the mid-west.

In 2026, Sanguinetti directed The Illusion of an Everlasting Summer a documentary film based upon her previous photography work, which will have its world premiere at the 79th Locarno Film Festival and distributed by Mubi.

She has been a member of Magnum Photos since 2007.

== Publications ==
=== Books of work by Sanguinetti ===
- The Adventures of Guille and Belinda and the Enigmatic Meaning of their Dreams.
  - Contact Sheet 120. Syracuse, NY: Light Work, 2003. ISBN 9780935445305.
  - Portland, OR: Nazraeli Press, 2010. ISBN 978-1590052693. With an essay by Gary Hesse.
- On the Sixth Day. Portland, OR: Nazraeli, 2005. ISBN 978-1590050705.
  - Mack, 2023
- Sorry Welcome. Oakland, CA: TBW, 2013. Subscription Series #4, Book #2. Edition of 1500. Sanguinetti, Christian Patterson, Raymond Meeks and Wolfgang Tillmans each had one book in a set of four.
- Le gendarme sur la colline. Co-published by Aperture and Fondation de l'entreprise Hermès, 2016.
- The Adventures of Guille and Belinda and The Illusion of an Everlasting Summer. London: Mack, 2020. ISBN 978-1-912339-97-6.
- Some Say Ice. London, Mack, 2022. ISBN 978-1-913620-71-4.

== Awards ==
- 2001: Hasselblad Foundation Grant
- 2007: MacDowell Fellowship
- 2008: Guggenheim Fellowship from the John Simon Guggenheim Memorial Foundation
- 2009: Robert Gardner Fellowship, Harvard Peabody Museum
- 2009: Photography Grant, National Geographic

== Exhibitions ==
=== Solo exhibitions ===
- The Life that Came, Yossi Milo Gallery, New York, 2008
- Le Gendarme Sur La Colline: Photographs by Alessandra Sanguinetti, Aperture Gallery, New York, 2017

=== Group exhibitions ===
- This Land, Pier 24, San Francisco, CA, 2018/19
- Close Enough: New Perspectives from 12 Women Photographers of Magnum, International Center of Photography, New York, 29 September 2022 – 9 January 2023
