= 21st Jogja-NETPAC Asian Film Festival =

2026 film festival

- Opening film: Silenced Nights by Lawrence Fajardo
- Closing film: You Are the Film by Makoto Ueda
- Location: Yogyakarta, Indonesia
- Festival date: 28 November–5 December 2026
- Website: jaff-filmfest.org

Jogja-NETPAC Asian Film Festival
- 20th

The 21st annual Jogja-NETPAC Asian Film Festival will take place from 28 November to 5 December 2026 in Yogyakarta, Indonesia. A total of 254 films from 34 Asia-Pacific countries will be screened at the festival. The festival will be opened with Lawrence Fajardo's drama film Silenced Nights and closed with Japanese comedy drama You Are the Film by Makoto Ueda.

== Juries ==
The following juries were named for the festival.

=== Hanoman Award ===
- Dita Gambiro, Indonesian production designer
- Riar Rizaldi, Indonesian artist and filmmaker
- Shan Zuolong, Chinese film producer

=== NETPAC Award ===
- Nguyên Lê, Vietnamese film critic
- Julita Pratiwi, Indonesian film researcher and educator
- Manotham Theamtheabrat, Thai film critic

=== Blencong Award ===
- Aditya Ahmad, Indonesian filmmaker
- Hindia, Indonesian musician
- Chantana Tiprachart, Thai artist and filmmaker

=== Indonesian Screen Award ===
- Sharifah Amani, Malaysian actress
- Kenji Tanigaki, Japanese action choreographer and director
- Yoon Ga-eun, South Korean filmmaker

=== Geber Award ===
- Evi Eliyanah, Indonesian lecturer
- Lius Manajati, Indonesian film practitioner
- Piet Manuputty, Indonesian filmmaker

=== Student Award ===
- Farras Sabian Rahmadyatmaja
- Muhammad Ainul Yaqi
- Natasya Aurelia Putri
- Risyad Ridha Rousydiy
- Steven Antonio

== Official selection ==
=== Opening and closing films ===
English title	Original title	Director(s)	Production countrie(s)
Silenced Nights (opening film)		Lawrence Fajardo	Philippines, France, Taiwan
You Are the Film (closing film)	君は映画	Makoto Ueda	Japan

=== In competition ===
English title	Original title	Director(s)	Production countrie(s)
9 Temples to Heaven	9 วัด สู่สวรรค์	Sompot Chidgasornpongse	Thailand, Singapore, France, Norway, China, Hong Kong, Indonesia, Qatar
A Girl Unknown	无名女孩	Zou Jing	China
Ah Girl		Ang Geck Geck Priscilla	Singapore
Black Coffee		Jeremias Nyangoen	Indonesia
Cherry and Virgin		Masanao Kawajiri	Japan
Fruit Gathering	သစ်သီးခူး	Aung Phyoe	Myanmar, Czech Republic, France
Hearing	Thính Giác	Lê Bảo	Singapore, Vietnam, Norway, France, Indonesia, Saudi Arabia, Cambodia, Thailand, Taiwan
Mayilaa		Semmalar Annam	India
Ria		Arvin Belarmino	Philippines, Netherlands, Norway, Japan, Saudi Arabia
Roid	রইদ	Mejbaur Rahman Sumon	Bangladesh

=== Light of Asia ===
English title	Original title	Director(s)	Production countrie(s)
3 Lost in Towers	跳房子	Jingyuan Liang, Shizhao Ye	China, United Kingdom
A Strange Bird	Ti Hu Chu Zou Zhi Hou	Bu Jingwei	China
A Sweet Day	Yek Rooz-e Shirin	Omid Abdollahi	Iran
Aman		Rahul Roye	India, United States, France, United Kingdom
ANIKI		Shunsuke Nakajima	Japan
Awake Before Your Gaze	你夢見我時，我已醒來	Lin Yi-Chi	Taiwan
The Bovine Comedy		Ratchapoom Boonbunchachoke	France
The Dream Is a Snail	Giấc Mơ Là Ốc Sên	Nguyễn Thiên Ân	Vietnam, South Korea
Dust in Dawn	Mu hou chao xi	Luming Feng	China
Fairy Baursaq	Фея Бауырсақ	Marina Starchenko	Kazakhstan
Fruits of Despair		Nima Nassaj	Iran
Golden Island	Kota Emas	Arief Budiman	Indonesia, Singapore
In Sum		Komtouch Napattaloong	Thailand
The Last Jiangshi	Mo Dai Jiang Shi	Yu Chih-Chieh	China, Hong Kong, Taiwan
No Place Like Home	看現場	Shen Chieh Tsang	Taiwan, Philippines
Scorching	诞辰日	Beidi Wang	China
Silent Voices		Nadine Misong Jin	United States, South Korea
Tripalium		Chayin Rujiratana	Thailand
Typhoon Mambo		Domenico Singha Pedroli	Switzerland, France, Thailand
We Bloom in Spring		Kali	United States, Myanmar
We Were Here		Pranav Bhasin	India

=== Panorama ===
English title	Original title	Director(s)	Production countrie(s)
The Age of Goodbyes	告別的年代	Edmund Yeo	Taiwan, Malaysia
All of a Sudden	急に具合が悪くなる	Ryusuke Hamaguchi	France, Japan, Germany, Belgium
The Assassin(s)	암살자(들)	Hur Jin-ho	South Korea
Bedford Park		Stephanie Ahn	South Korea, United States
Big Little Things	謊言生活	Michelle Zhou	Hong Kong, United States
Burn	炎上	Makoto Nagahisa	Japan
Furies		Rami Kodeih	Lebanon, Brazil
Grotesqqque	グロテスク	Atsushi Nishigori, Takahiro Miura	Japan
Ha-Chan, Shake Your Booty!		Josef Kubota Wladyka	Japan, United States
Let Us Through, Dear Ancestors	Makikiraan Po	Lav Diaz	Philippines
The Remotes		John Torres	Philippines
The World Before	첫세계	Yoon Dan-bi	South Korea

=== Asian Perspectives ===
English title	Original title	Director(s)	Production countrie(s)
2 Valid IDs		Ma-an L. Asuncion-Dagñalan	Philippines
58th		Carl Joseph Papa	Philippines
THE A-CARE -Disusebody-	Haiyoushin	Kohki Yoshida	Japan
Ali's Wish	Hajat Ali	Jared Lee	Malaysia, Singapore, Japan
Anfa 8		Karzan Kardozi	Kurdistan Region, Iraq, United States
Baby Jackfruit Baby Guava		Nong Nhat Quang	Vietnam, South Korea
Baga: Tomorrow Belongs to No One	Baga: Esok untuk Siapa	Ariff Zulkarnain	Malaysia
The Blind Girl and an Elephant	সাঁকোটা দুলছে	Ishtiyak Ahmad Zihad	Bangladesh
Blood Moon Rite 8	Đại Tiệc Trăng Máu	Phan Gia Nhật Linh	Vietnam
Break Free	Odore Yakuza	Yu Nakamoto	Japan
The Catstody War	냥육권 전쟁	Yoo Hak-chan	South Korea
Company Sports Day	직장인 체육대회	Lee Yong Sun	South Korea
Delupi		Mohammad Touqir Islam	Bangladesh
Early Days		Priyankar Patra	India, Singapore
Far Away Close to You	សែនឆ្ងាយក្បែរអ្នក	Mony Kann Darung	Cambodia
Frosted Window	흐린 창문 너머의 누군가	Kim Jong-kwan	South Korea
Hotspring Shark Attack 2: Great Kyushu Showdown	Onsen Shark 2: Kyushu Dai-Kessen	Morito Inoue	Japan
Khoriya		Vishwendra Singh	India
Leftover		Salim Ahamed	India
Longtake Onetake Mistake	롱테이크 원테이크 미스테이크	Baek Seung-kee	South Korea
Master	মাস্টার	Rezwan Shahriar Sumit	Bangladesh
Pace	脚踏实地	Jonathan Choo	Singapore
Queue	Pila	Adolfo Alix Jr.	Philippines
Status: Rejected		Vahn Leinard Pascual	Philippines
Turgaud	Торғауыт	Adilkhan Yerzhanov	Kazakhstan, France
Zsazsa Zaturnnah		Avid Liongoren	Philippines, France

=== Rewind ===
English title	Original title	Director(s)	Production countrie(s)
Cure (1997)	キュア	Kiyoshi Kurosawa	Japan
Howl's Moving Castle (2004)	ハウルの動く城	Hayao Miyazaki	Japan
Mukhsin (2006)		Yasmin Ahmad	Malaysia
My Girl (2003)	แฟนฉัน	Vitcha Gojiew, Songyos Sugmakanan, Nithiwat Tharathorn, Witthaya Thongyooyong, Anusorn Trisirikasem, Komgrit Triwimol	Thailand
My Neighbor Totoro (1988)	となりのトトロ	Hayao Miyazaki	Japan
Spirited Away (2001)	千と千尋の神隠し	Hayao Miyazaki	Japan
Train to Busan (2016)	부산행	Yeon Sang-ho	South Korea
Rewind: Romance as a Generational Memory
Cin(T)a (2009)		Sammaria Sari Simanjuntak	Indonesia
Eiffel... I'm in Love (2003)		Nasri Cheppy	Indonesia
Friend Zone (2019)	ระวัง..สิ้นสุดทางเพื่อน	Chayanop Boonprakob	Thailand
Heart (2006)		Hanny R. Saputra	Indonesia
Heart Attack (2015)	ฟรีแลนซ์..ห้ามป่วย ห้ามพัก ห้ามรักหมอ	Nawapol Thamrongrattanarit	Thailand
I Fine..Thank You..Love You (2014)		Mez Tharatorn	Thailand
The Seventh House (2003)	Rumah Ketujuh	Rudy Soedjarwo	Indonesia
The Teacher's Diary (2014)	คิดถึงวิทยา	Nithiwat Tharathorn	Thailand

=== Nocturnal ===
English title	Original title	Director(s)	Production countrie(s)
The Day We Embraced the Universe	Anohi Uchuwo Dakishimeta	Kenichi Ugana	Japan
Mum, I'm Alien Pregnant		THUNDERLIPS	New Zealand
Never After Dark	ネバーアフターダーク	Dave Boyle	Japan
Oscillation	Sekainoowariyori	Kenichi Ugana	Japan

=== Indonesian Screen Awards ===
English title	Original title	Director(s)
The Art of Seducing God	Seni Merayu Tuhan	Cesa David Luckmansyah
Bara & the Secret Forest	Bara & Hutan Rahasia	Eman Pradipta
Coming Home	Pulang Kampung	Bene Dion Rajagukguk
I Saw Her in Motion		Umi Lestari
Jani Be Good	Desember Jani	Ariani Darmawan
Mate's Rate	Harga Teman	Andrew Kose
My Mother	IBUKU	Eddie Cahyono
Philosophy of the Porch	Filosofi Teras	Affandi Abdul Rachman
Secrets		Ravi Bharwani
Shattered Vows	Kampia Siriah	Ferdinand Almi

=== Indonesian Film Showcase ===
English title	Original title	Director(s)
The Island of Two Faces: Nusakambangan		Iyas Lawrence
My Own Last Supper	Rencana Besar untuk Mati dengan Tenang	Ismail Basbeth
One Day for Love	Satu Hari untuk Cinta	Herman Kumala Panca A.
Our Son	Dua Hati Ibu	Luhki Herwanayogi
