= 39th Tokyo International Film Festival =

2026 Japanese film festival

- Official poster
- Opening film: Sukiyaki by Zeze Takahisa
- Closing film: Colony by Yeon Sang-ho
- Location: Tokyo, Japan
- Founded: 1985
- Awards: Tokyo Grand Prix
- Hosted by: UNIJAPAN; Ministry of Economy, Trade and Industry; Japan Foundation; Tokyo Metropolitan Government
- Artistic director: Koshino Junko
- No. of films: 204
- Festival date: Opening: October 26, 2026; Closing: November 4, 2026
- Website: 2026 TIFF

Tokyo International Film Festival
- 40th 38th

The 39th Tokyo International Film Festival took place from 26 October to 4 November 2026 at Yūrakuchō-Marunouchi-Ginza area. Dutch Australian film director Rolf de Heer served as the Jury President of international competition. The jury reviewed 15 international films to determine the recipient of the Tokyo Grand Prix and other awards.

The opening ceremony took place inside Hulic Hall, with Kento Nakajima, Japanese singer, actor, voice actor and television personality serving as the host and official navigator and the face of the festival. Japanese musical film Sukiyaki directed by Zeze Takahisa, telling the story behind the pop song "Sukiyaki," sung by crooner Kyu Sakamoto was the opening film.

The closing ceremony was held on November 4, 2026, where the various awards were presented. Tokyo Vice Governor Yamashita Satoshi presented the Governor of Tokyo Award to North Macedonia comedy-drama film Sister Brother Manhole Cover by Milcho Manchevski. Argentine filmmaker Lisandro Alonso won the best director award for his slow cinema film Double Freedom. The festival closed with South Korean action horror film Colony by Yeon Sang-ho.

== Festival overview ==
Festival navigator Kento Nakajima at the red carpet ceremony on October 26

This section sums up the main things taking place during the festival:

- 'A'-list classification

The festival is classified as 'A'-list festival from 2026, joining prestigious competitive festivals such as Cannes, Berlin, Venice, Locarno and San Sebastian, under the revamped accreditation process by the International Federation of Film Producers' Associations.

The film registration for the festival began on April 7, 2026 with the closing date for submission fixed for July 7, 2026.

- Three new initiative

Kashiko Kawakita Award : A new award that takes its name from Kashiko Kawakita, known as "Madame Kawakita", was a Japanese film producer and film curator, and the wife of Nagamasa Kawakita. The award is established by the Kawakita Memorial Film Institute to honour women advancing film culture in Japan and internationally.

Nippon Cinema Now section: This section will now award a Best Film prize and a Special Jury Prize from 2026, with a jury combining Japanese and international industry figures.

Crosscut Asia+: A new section, which is developed with the Japan Foundation that continues the mission of the earlier Crosscut Asia strand.

- Poster

The poster unveiled on September 11, was created by Japanese graphic designer Oshima Idea in collaboration with Mipo O, a Japanese director. The poster celebrates this year’s TIFF theme, "connecting―cinema connects us to the world beyond." It bears the photo of young lead of the 2025 film How Dare You?, Tetta Shimada taken by cinematographer Tanaka Hajime.

=== Japan Premiere of Displacement Film Fund Shorts ===
Five short films backed by the Displacement Film Fund will have their Japanese premiere at the festival. Cate Blanchett, co-founder of the fund will attend the Premiere of these short films.

=== Cultural programs ===
This edition will host extra cultural programs along with its main competition. These include a symposium discussing a possible new international anime award, and an event celebrating the 10th year of its Teens Cinema Workshop.

=== 2026 lineup ===
The festival unveiled its complete line-up including titles in the Asian Future and Nippon Cinema Now competitive strands on October 1, 2026. The 39th edition screened 204 films from 112 countries out of which 83 were Japanese films and 35 were world premieres. 47 films are directed or co-directed by women.

=== TIFF Teens Cine Club ===
Yukino Kishii will join TIFF's Teens Cine Club 10th anniversary program.

== Juries ==
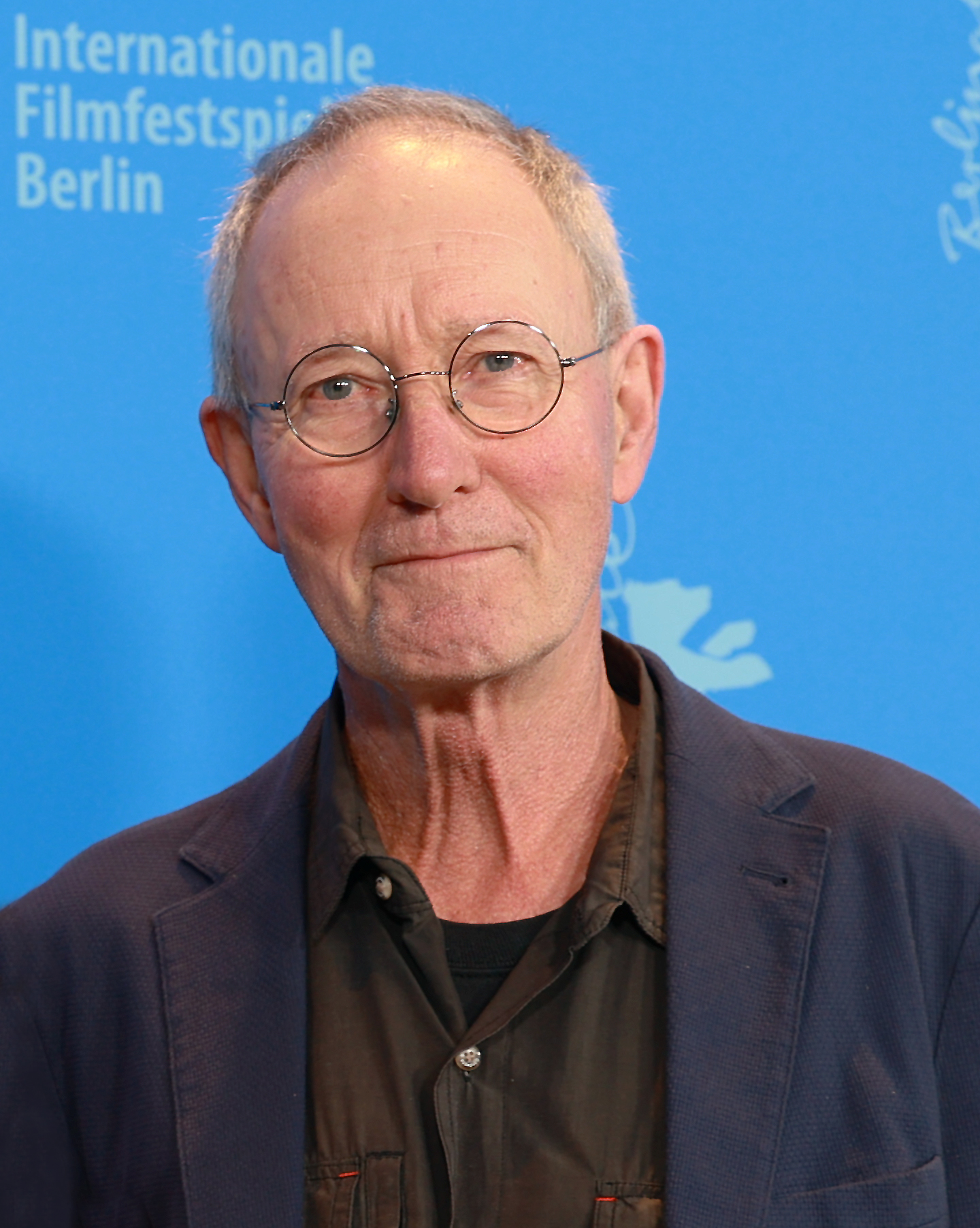
Rolf de Heer, Jury president, Main competition

The juries consisted of the following members:

=== Main competition ===
- Rolf de Heer, Dutch-Australian film director – Jury president
- Alex Lo, producer and the founder of Cinema Inutile, a New York and Tokyo-based development, production and finance company
- Oh Jung-wan, founder and producer of Bom Film Productions, a prominent film production company in South Korea.
- Makiko Watanabe, Japanese actress
- Yov Moor, French colorist

=== Asian Future Jury ===
- Eiko Mizuno-Gray, CEO / Producer, Loaded Films Ltd
- Akio Fujimoto, Japanese film director and screenwriter.
- Yulia Evina Bhara, Indonesian film and theatre producer and founder of KawanKawan Media, a production company based in Jakarta

=== Nippon Cinema Now Jury ===
- Mathieu Macheret, graduate of École nationale supérieure Louis-Lumière, film critic at Le Monde, lecturer and film-club host
- Murata Chieko, Corporate Executive, Myriagon Studio
- Sabrina Baracetti, President, Udine Far East Film Festival

=== TIFF Ethical Film Award ===
- Hayato Isomura, Japanese actor
- Student PR Team
  - Kanenori Kurumi (Musashino Art Univ.)
  - Goujima Seitaro (Chuo Univ.)
  - Takahashi Shiori (Hosei Univ.)

== Screening venues ==
- Cine Switch Ginza (Chuo City)
- Kadokawa Cinema Yurakucho
- Toho Cinemas Chanter,
- Toho Cinemas,
- Humantrust Cinema Yurakucho,
- Marunouchi Piccadilly,
- Hulic Hall Tokyo,
- Hibiya Step Square,
- LEXUS MEETS...,
- Mitsubishi Building 1F M+ Success (Chiyoda City)

== Official Selection ==
The full line-up was revealed on October 1, 2026. The lineup is a mix of new features from Asia's auteurs, Hollywood films and films from up-coming filmmakers.

Sukiyaki by Zeze Takahisa will be the opening film of the festival.

English title	Original title	Director(s)	Production country(ies)
Opening film
Sukiyaki	上を向いて歩こう	Takahisa Zeze	Japan
Centerpiece Screening
Godzilla Minus Zero	ゴジラ-0.0マイナスゼロ	Takashi Yamazaki	Japan
Closing film
Colony		Yeon Sang-ho	South Korea

=== International Competition ===
The main competition has 15 films vying for Tokyo Grand Prix.

† Indicates award winner.

English Title	Original Title	Director(s)	Production Country
The Canary's Lullaby	我親愛的怪孩子	Ikeda Akira	Taiwan, Japan
The Difficult Bride		Rubaiyat Hossain	Bangladesh, France, Portugal, Norway, Germany
Double Freedom	La Libertad Doble	Lisandro Alonso	Argentina, Chile, Luxembourg, Germany, Italy, Uruguay, United Kingdom
Even If Hell Came	Se Venisse Anche l'Inferno	Samuele Rossi	Italy
Fuxi: Joy in Four Chapters	腹喜	Qiu Jiongjiong	Hong Kong, Taiwan, Japan, Saudi Arabia, Qatar
Heysel 85		Teodora Ana Mihai	Belgium, Romania, Netherlands, Germany
The Intertwining	過怠	Akira Yamamoto	Japan
Magic Atlas	魔法星图	Sun Xun	Singapore
Memories of Prison	Memórias do Cárcere	Sérgio Graciano	Portugal
The Night That Binds Us	略知她一二	Wang Jiang-yong	France, Hong Kong
Red Before Dawn	Merah Sebelum Fajar	Garin Nugroho	Indonesia
Sister Brother Manhole Cover †	Сестра, брат и шахта	Milcho Manchevski	North Macedonia, Bulgaria, Serbia, Albania, Italy, United Kingdom
Trees Are Watching		Bahman Ghobadi	Turkey
Two Cigarettes, Three Nights	男ともだち	Yukiko Mishima	Japan
Until the Day Ends	Do kraja dana	Jelena Maksimović	Serbia, Bulgaria, Slovenia, Montenegro, Croatia, Germany

=== Asian Future ===
This competitive section presents 10 titles, eight of which will have world premieres.

English Title	Original Title	Director(s)	Production Country
Edjop		Katski Flores	Philippines
I'm Nothing Special Really	واقعا آدم خاصی نیستم	Navid Mohammadzadeh	Iran
Jani Be Good	Desember Jani	Ariani Darmawan	Indonesia
Miracle Summer		Cai Ronglin	Japan
On the Heights	낮은곳으로부터	Kim Hyun-min	South Korea
The Paper Flower	காகித மலர்	Chezhiyan	India
Saravah		Kujiraoka Hironori	Japan
Serife Tavsan		Tareq Daoud	Switzerland, Türkiye
Shyrmauyq		Azamat Shargyn	Kazakhstan
Silver	Noghreh	Soheil Karimi	Iran

=== Nippon Cinema Now ===
English Title	Original Title	Director(s)	Production Country
Between Us	いえないふたり	Matsumura Shingo	Japan
Okinawa Saudade	オキナワ・サウダージ	Matsubayashi Yoju	Japan
Kefi		Saito Kisin	Japan
Earthlings in Love	恋する地球人 -劇場特別版-	Ueda Shinichiro	Japan
silver express	シルバー・エクスプレス	Tanaka Miki	Japan
Hinotama: Ball of Fire	火の玉を見た	Yaza Takenoshin	Japan
Plastic Love!	プラスチック・ラブ！	Sybilla Patrizia, Clementine Nuttall	Japan, Austria
Chihiro Akemi	ほとりの家で	Natori Satoshi	Japan
Yamazaki Riverside -Over an Actor's Shoulder -	山﨑リバーサイド - 俳優の肩ごしに -	Inudo Isshin	Japan

=== Gala Selection ===
The following films were selected to be screened as part of the Gala Selection.

English Title	Original Title	Director(s)	Production Country
All the Lovers in the Night	すべて真夜中の恋人たち	Yukiko Sode	Japan
Arrested Memory	狂忘警探	Sabu	Taiwan, Japan
Behemoth!		Tony Gilroy	United States
The Beloved	El ser querido	Rodrigo Sorogoyen	Spain, France
A Bouquet of Light for You	ないものねだりの君に光の花束を	Hiroshi Ando	Japan
Bye Bye Love: Detective Is in the Bar	探偵はBARにいる	Kazuya Shiraishi	Japan
Diary of a Mad Old Man		Wayne Wang	Japan, United States
Fjord		Cristian Mungiu	Romania, Norway, Denmark, Finland, France, Sweden
Sunshine Women’s Choir	Yang guang nü zi he chang tuan	Gavin Lin	Taiwan
Teenage Sex and Death at Camp Miasma		Jane Schoenbrun	United States
The Tiger and Her Wings The Movie	監督：梛川善郎	Yoshiro Nagikawa	Japan
Verity		Michael Showalter	United States
Wild Horse Nine		Martin McDonagh	United Kingdom, United States, Chile
Your Story	君の話	Nakagawa Ryutaro	Japan

=== World Focus ===
The following films were selected for the World Focus section, which focuses on international films.

English Title	Original Title	Director(s)	Production Country
DAU		Ilya Khrzhanovsky	Germany, France, Sweden, Russia
The Dreamed Adventure	Das Geträumte Abenteuer	Valeska Grisebach	Germany, France, Austria, Bulgaria
Hearing	Thính giác	Lê Bảo	Singapore, Vietnam, Norway, France, Indonesia, Saudi Arabia, Cambodia, Thailand, Taiwan
Flies	Moscas	Fernando Eimbcke	Mexico
La bola negra		Javier Calvo and Javier Ambrossi	Spain, France
Let Us Through, Dear Ancestors	Makikiraan po	Lav Diaz	Philippines
The Masque of the Red Death		Roger Corman	United States, United Kingdom
The Match	El partido	Juan Cabral and Santiago Franco	Argentina
My Wife Cries	Meine Frau weint	Angela Schanelec	Germany, France
To Be Ordinary	有用的人	Lee Yun-chan	Taiwan
The Road to Jericho		Amos Gitai	France, United Kingdom
Sixteen Moments of My Life	Seize moments de ma vie	Albert Serra	France, Spain
Sleep No More	Monster Pabrik Rambut	Edwin	Indonesia, Singapore, Japan, Germany, France
The Survival of Kindness		Rolf de Heer	Australia

=== Animation ===
The following films were selected for the Animation section.

English Title	Original Title	Director(s)	Production Country
Amadeo and the Hypothetical New World		Brenda Lígia and Edu Felistoque	Brazil
ghost – end of night		Shingo Natsume	Japan
Iron Boy	Le Corset	Louis Clichy	France, Belgium
We Are Aliens		Kohei Kadowaki	Japan, France

=== Japanese Classics ===
The following films were selected for the Japanese Classics section.

Year	English Title	Original Title	Director(s)	Production Country
1967	Scattered Clouds 4K Digitally Remastered Version	乱れ雲	Mikio Naruse	Japan

=== Youth ===
The following films were selected for the Youth section.

English Title	Original Title	Director(s)	Production Country
A Day in the Life of Jo: Chapter Phaedra	Mia mera sti zoi tis tzo: kefalaio Faidra	Jacqueline Lentzou	Greece, Germany, France
The River Train	El Tren Fluvial	Lorenzo Ferro and Lucas A. Vignale	Argentina

=== Women’s Empowerment ===
English Title	Original Title	Director(s)	Production Country
Far From the Trees	Lejos de los árboles	Meritxell Colell	Spain, Peru, Italy
A Girl Unknown	无名女孩	Zou Jing	China
I Rarely Wake Up Dreaming	Selten wache ich träumend auf	Isabelle Stever	Germany, Ukraine
Lovers in the Blue Night		Anuparna Roy	India, United States
The Meltdown	El deshielo	Manuela Martelli	Chile, United States, Spain, Mexico

=== Crosscut Asia+ ===
A new re-vamped section developed with the Japan Foundation that continues the mission of the earlier Crosscut Asia strand.

English Title	Original Title	Director(s)	Production Country
Becoming Human	ជាតិជាមនុស្សា	Polen Ly	Cambodia
Behind the Flickering Light: The Archive	Anak Sabiran, Di Balik Cahaya Gemerlapan: Sang Arsip	Hafiz Rancajale	Indonesia
Filipiñana		Rafael Manuel	Singapore, United Kingdom, Philippines, France, Netherlands
Four Seasons in Java	Empat Musim Pertiwi	Kamila Andini	Indonesia, France, Netherlands, Norway, Poland, Saudi Arabia, Singapore
Small Hours of the Night		Daniel Hui	Singapore
Turang (1957)		Bachtiar Siagian	Indonesia

=== Special Screenings ===
English Title	Original Title	Director(s)	Production Country
The Butterfly Murders	蝶變	Tsui Hark	Hong Kong
Monster in Sheep's Clothing	羊の皮を着たケモノ	Yang Liping	Japan
What We Call Happiness	羊の皮を着たケモノ	Enomoto Norio	Japan
Wildwood		Travis Knight	United States

=== Akira Kurosawa's Favorite Films ===
The following films will be screened as a part of a section consisting of Japanese director Akira Kurosawa favorite films.

Year	English Title	Original Title	Director(s)	Production Country
1928	The Circus		Charlie Chaplin	United States
1952	Ikiru (4K restoration)	生きる	Kurosawa Akira	Japan
1943	Sanshiro Sugata (4K restoration)	姿三四郎	Kurosawa Akira	Japan
1987	Where Is the Friend's House?	خانه دوست کجاست	Abbas Kiarostami	Iran

=== Mizoguchi Kenji ===
- TIFF/NFAJ Classics: Kenji Mizoguchi

With the colobration of National Film Archive of Japan, the festival will present a special retrospective of the films by auteur Mizoguchi Kenji to commemorate the 70th death anniversary of the director.

The full screening schedule is as follows:

- Osaka Elegy (1936)
- Sisters of the Gion (1936)
- The 47 Ronin Part 1 (1941)
- The 47 Ronin Part 2 (1942)
- The Story of the Last Chrysanthemums (digital restoration, 1939)
- Princess Yang Kwei Fei (1955)
- Tales of the Taira Clan (digital restoration, 1955)
- Street of Shame (digital restoration, 1956)
- A Geisha (1953)
- Ugetsu (digital restoration, 1953)
- Sansho the Bailiff (digital restoration, 1954)
- The Crucified Lovers (digital restoration, 1954)

== Awards ==
The awards were announced on November 4 in the closing ceremony:

- Tokyo Grand Prix, (The Governor of Tokyo Award): Sister Brother Manhole Cover by Milcho Manchevski
- Special Jury Prize: Magic Atlas by Sun Xun
- Award for Best Director: Lisandro Alonso for Double Freedom
- Award for Best Actress: Hu Ling for The Night That Binds Us
- Award for Best Actor: Ryo Narita for Two Cigarettes, Three Nights
- Award for Best Artistic Contribution: Until the Day Ends by Jelena Maksimović
- The Audience Award: Heysel 85 by Teodora Ana Mihai
- Asian Future Best Film Award: Serife Tavsan by Tareq Daoud
- Asian Future Special Mention: Jani Be Good by Ariani Darmawan
- TIFF Ethical Film Award: I Rarely Wake Up Dreaming by Isabelle Stever
- Asian Students' Grand Prix Award: Running Wild in the Sun by Nguyen Vu Hien Chi
- Asian Students' Special Jury Prize:
  - Everything's Peachy by Nah Yi-chen
  - All of Her by Kim Nam-hyeon
- Nippon Cinema Now Best Film: silver express by Tanaka Miki
- Nippon Cinema Now Special Jury Prize: Between Us by Matsumura Shingo

=== Kashiko Kawakita Award ===
- Hata Sahoko, film critic

=== Kurosawa Akira Award ===
- Mipo O, Japanese-born Korean film director, screenwriter, and commercial director
- Mohammad Rasoulof, Iranian independent filmmaker who lives in exile in Europe

=== Global Cinema Leadership Special Award ===
- Bill Kramer, chief executive officer of the Academy of Motion Picture Arts and Sciences
