= 63rd Golden Horse Awards =

Award ceremony for Chinese-language films of 2025 and 2026

- Official poster
- Date: November 22, 2026
- Site: Taipei Music Center, Taipei, Taiwan
- Hosted by: Will Or
- Preshow hosts: Pink Yang; Huang Di-yang
- Organized by: Taipei Golden Horse Film Festival Executive Committee

Highlights
- Most nominations: Arrested Memory (11)

The 63rd Golden Horse Awards (Chinese: 第63屆金馬獎) will take place on November 22, 2026, at the Taipei Music Center in Taipei, Taiwan. Organized by the Taipei Golden Horse Film Festival Executive Committee, the ceremony honors outstanding achievements in Chinese-language cinema from 2025 and 2026. Hong Kong actor Will Or will host the ceremony.

The nominees were announced on October 1, 2026. Veteran Taiwanese actress and filmmaker Sylvia Chang will preside over the jury. Taiwanese director Yu Kan-ping was named the recipient of the Lifetime Achievement Award.

== Jury ==
- Sylvia Chang, Taiwanese actress and filmmaker – Jury President
- Chong Keat Aun, Malaysian director, screenwriter and composer
- Hwarng Wern-ying, Taiwanese production designer, costume Designer, director and producer
- Lau Kek Huat, Malaysian director
- Elaine Chu, Hong Kong producer
- Mani Man Pui Hing, Hong Kong producer and screenwriter
- Chiu Li-wei, animation director
- Lu Shih-yuan, screenwriter and producer
- Chang Jung-chi, director
- Kuo Li-chi, sound mixer and supervisor
- Feng Hsin-Hua, cinematographer
- Liao Huei-li, production designer
- Lu Luming, music producer and composer
- Hung Tzu-hsuan, director
- Ernest Chan Chi Wa, film critic, curator and former president of the Hong Kong Film Critics Society

== Winners and nominees ==
Best Narrative Feature: Girl; Double Happiness; We Are Born Good; Arrested Memory; We Are All Strangers	Best Director: Herman Yau – We're Nothing at All; Edmund Yeo – The Age of Goodbyes; Joseph Hsu Chen-chieh – Double Happiness; Sabu – Arrested Memory; Anthony Chen – We Are All Strangers
Best Leading Actor: Leon Dai – Kung Fu; Liu Kuan-ting – Double Happiness; Yeung Wai-lun – We Are Born Good; Ethan Juan – Arrested Memory; Jack Tan – Dead Tide	Best Leading Actress: Angela Yuen – Afterpiece; Jennifer Yu – Double Happiness; Liang Cuishan – Big Little Things; Chung Suet Ying – We Are Born Good; Yeo Yann Yann – We Are All Strangers
Best Supporting Actor: Anson Kong – We're Nothing at All; Berant Zhu – Kung Fu; Tin Kai-man – Double Happiness; Akira Huang – Arrested Memory; Andi Lim – We Are All Strangers	Best Supporting Actress: Audrey Lin – Girl; Mhia Firdaus – SAYANG; Sun Jialing – Big Little Things; Judy Ongg – Sunshine Women's Choir; Kearen Pang – We Are Born Good
Best New Director: Shu Qi – Girl; Ang Geck Geck Priscilla – Ah Girl; Shieh Meng-ju – Mudborn; Michelle Zhou – Big Little Things; Yeung Leung Chuen – We Are Born Good	Best New Performer: Bai Xiao-ying – Girl; Ong Xuan Jing – Ah Girl; Nandagopall Mohan – SAYANG; Ho Man-xi – Sunshine Women's Choir; Jaden Wang – Will You Still Be My Friend
Best Original Screenplay: Afterpiece – Keane T.K. Wong; Unidentified Murder – Kwok Ka-hei, Jack Lee Chun-kit, Ho Siu-hong, Choi Ka-hang; SAYANG – Tang Hsiang-chu; Double Happiness – Hsieh Pei-ju, Joseph Hsu Chen-chieh; We Are Born Good – Yeung Leung Chuen, Thomas	Best Adapted Screenplay: The Violinist – Ervin Han, Jordan Katherine See; Ah Girl – Ang Geck Geck Priscilla; The Age of Goodbyes – Edmund Yeo; Big Little Things – Michelle Zhou; Will You Still Be My Friend – Lu Po-shun, Chen Chia-ping
Best Film Editing: Girl – William Chang, Lai Kwun-tung; Double Happiness – Chen Chun-hung; We Are Born Good – Wenders Li; Arrested Memory – Matthieu Laclau; We Are All Strangers – Chen Ho-ping	Best Live Action Short Film: The Last Jiangshi – Yu Chih-chieh; She Said – Ivan Tan; Three Little Pigs – Chung Kam-nei; Fruit – Lim Jen-nee; Her Slope – Kuo Pei-chi
Best Documentary Feature: The Dance of a Soloist – Lee Li-shao; The Whisper of Sunlight – Wong Siu-pong; Scenes from Departure – Chan Kam-hei; Almost Home – Jiang Wenjie; Etude – Lin Yu-en	Best Documentary Short Film: Myanmar Girls – Flora Huang Ling-hwa; The Paperflower Still Blooms – Yeh Chih-fang; Night Journey – Tsai Ming-liang; Amateur in the Moon – Huang Pang-chuan, Lin Chun-ni; A Farewell to Julieta – Lei Cheok-mei
Best Animated Feature: Magic Atlas – Sun Xun; Welcome to Dolly's House – Seven Ych, Rady Fu, Liu Yu-shu; The Violinist – Ervin Han, Raúl García	Best Animated Short Film: Stacy – Lin Yi-ling; Deep End – Zhang Puzhen; You Are Not Part of the Cake – Chen Ting-jui; The Buried Baby – Fish Wang, Yang Ya-ting; Bowknot – Li Yizhou
Best Original Film Score: The Violinist – Ricky Ho, Isabel Latorre Sáez; Girl – Lim Giong; Kung Fu – Chris Hou, Sherwin Yang, eMMa Kao, William Huang; We Are All Strangers – Kin Leonn, Thomas Foguenne; Dead Tide – Ryota Katayama	Best Original Film Song: "Everything's Gonna Be Alright" from Double Happiness Lyricist/Composer/Performer: 9m88; "Happiness Is Singing" from Sunshine Women's Choir Lyricist: Gavin Lin Composer: Ferry Lee Performer: A-Lin; "We Are Born Good" from We Are Born Good Lyricist: Morgan Cheung Composer: Sara Fung Performer: Ian Hannz; "Stop Running" from Arrested Memory Lyricist/Composer: Tseng Kuo-hung Performer: Sunset Rollercoaster; "Gone With the Tide" from Dead Tide Lyricist: David Ke Composer: Ryota Katayama Performer: Ryota Katayama, Hung Pei-yu
Best Cinematography: Girl – Yu Jing-pin; The Age of Goodbyes – Chen Chi-wen; Double Happiness – Chen Ko-chin; Arrested Memory – Jai Ip; Dead Tide – Kartik Vijay	Best Sound Effects: Girl – Wu Shu-yao, Tu Duu-chih, Tang Hsiang-chu; The Canary's Lullaby – Eddie Huang Nien-yung, Chen Yi-ling, Wang Tzu-jou, Lo Song-ce; Kung Fu – R.T Kao, Lee Yu-chih, Yang Jia-shen, Chen Jia-li; SAYANG – Wu Shu-yao, Hsu Chiao-han, Liu Pei-min; Arrested Memory – Patrick Tu, Tu Duu-chih
Best Makeup & Costume Design: Girl – Hsu Li-wen; Kung Fu – Karen Yip, Hsiao Pai-chen, Liu Hsien-chia; We Are Born Good – Dora Ng, Kim Ng; Arrested Memory – Zoey Su, Emma Lin Yu-yun; We Are All Strangers – Irin Lee, Red Ngoh	Best Art Direction: Girl – Huang Mei-ching, Tu Shuo-feng; Kung Fu – Wang Chih-cheng, Yang Ya-chun, Eitzel Chang; The Age of Goodbyes – Ray Tan; Arrested Memory – Chen Po-jen; Dead Tide – Soon Yong-chow
Best Visual Effects: Kung Fu – ArChin Yen, Chen Yen-ping, Tseng Huai-ju, Wayne Tseng; SAYANG – Tomi Kuo, Ivan Lin, Hannah Han; Mudborn – ArChin Yen; The Photo from 1977 – Evan Wen, Hu Hong-yu, Woody Yeh, Sean Tsai; The Last Hunter – VT Chiew, Maxine Y.M. Tung, Xander Guo, Huang Min-pin	Best Action Choreography: DEAD END – Teddy Ray Huang; Kung Fu – Chang Jae-wook, Kim Kyoung-woo; Mudborn – Hung Shih-hao; Arrested Memory – Hung Shih-hao, Fan Keng-hua, Chen Ming-you

== Honorary awards ==
Lifetime Achievement Award: Yu Kan-ping	Outstanding Taiwanese Filmmaker of the Year: Moya Chou

== Out-of-competition awards ==
Audience Choice Award: Double Happiness	Taiwan Film Critics Society Award: Elephants in the Fog
FIPRESCI Prize: Girl; Ah Girl; Big Little Things; Will You Still Be My Friend; Afterpiece; We Are Born Good; SAYANG; Mudborn	NETPAC Award: The World Before; Ah Girl; Big Little Things; The Water Will Carry Us; Running Wild; Elephants in the Fog; Fruit Gathering; Filipiñana; Hearing; Our Share of Sand; Fujiko
New Currents Youth Perspective Award: A Family	New Currents Educational Outreach Award: Dua
