= Los muertos (film) =

Los Muertos
- Written by: Lisandro Alonso
- Starring: Argentino Vargas
- Cinematography: Cobi Migliora
- Edited by: Lisandro Alonso
- Release date: 3 November 2004
- Running time: 78 minutes
- Country: Argentina
- Languages: Spanish, Guarani

Los Muertos (Spanish: Los Muertos) is a 2004 Argentine drama film directed by Lisandro Alonso. It follows a released prisoner (Vargas) who, convicted of murder years ago, looks for his now adult daughter. Vargas' journey is slow and contemplative though Alonso refuses to externalize his psychology, making much of the film's events open-ended and impressionistic.

The film is considered part of Alonso's "Lonely Man Trilogy," which also includes La Libertad and Liverpool.

== Cast ==
- Argentino Vargas as Vargas
