= Heysel 85 =

2026 Belgian-Dutch-German drama film

- Theatrical release poster
- Directed by: Teodora Ana Mihai
- Screenplay by: Isabelle Darras; Lode Desmet; Teodora Ana Mihai
- Produced by: Hans Everaert
- Starring: Violet Braeckman; Matteo Simoni; Josse De Pauw; Fabrizio Rongione; Michel de Warzée
- Cinematography: Marius Panduru
- Edited by: Bert Jacobs
- Music by: Anna Bauer
- Production companies: Leitwolf Filmproduktion; Les Films du Fleuve; Menuetto Film; Topkapi Films
- Distributed by: Kinepolis Film Distribution
- Release date: February 14, 2026
- Running time: 92 minutes
- Countries: Belgium; Netherlands; Germany
- Language: Dutch

Heysel 85 is a 2026 Belgian-Dutch-German drama film directed by Teodora Ana Mihai. The film stars Violet Braeckman and Matteo Simoni.

== Plot ==
The fictional story is set during the Heysel Stadium disaster that took place on 29 May 1985 at the Heysel Stadium in Brussels, during the 1985 European Cup Final between Liverpool and Juventus, which resulted in the deaths of 39 supporters. During the tragedy, Marie (Violet Braeckman), the mayor's daughter, and Luca (Matteo Simoni), a journalist, find themselves at the center of the events.

== Cast ==
| Actor | Character |
|---|---|
| Matteo Simoni | Luca Rossi |
| Violet Braeckman | Marie Dumont |
| Josse De Pauw | Marc Dumont |
| Fabrizio Rongione | Albert Simons |
| Michel de Warzée | Bernard Dubois |
| Bruno Georis | UEFA President |
| Pieter Verelst | Frank Moulin |
| Ben Segers | Filip Mertens |
| Giovanni Guzzo | Gianni Monachini |
| Barnaby Apps | Sir John Winter |
| Richard Wells | Joe Brooks |
| Anne-Claire | Francoise Dumont |
| Carlo Ferrante | Franco Biancardi |
| Paolo Calabresi | Giacomo Ferragni |
| Emanuela Ponzano | Monica Fresia |
| Fabio Capodicasa | Antonio Rossi |
| Luca Franceschi | Guido Rossi |
| Jonathon Sawdon | Jeremy Bennett |
| Han Coucke | Sven Beke |
| Kris Cuppens | Joel Joncker |
| Francesco Mormino | Daniele Rossi |
| Bobby Schofield | Alan West |
| Zita Windey | Emma |
| Kok-Hwa Lie | Tony Liang |
| Patrizia Berti | Italian journalist |
| Issam Dakka | Nassim Cherki |
| Tine Roggeman | Mathilde Van De Velde |
| Claude Semal | Gerard Durieux |
| Leon Pietro Atman Mutti | Young Italian man |
| Gert Winckelmans | Eric Lorant |
| Aran Bertetto | Alessandro Gamba |
| Martin Swabey | Barry Ellis |
| Annelore Crollet | Karen |
| Dominique Van Malder | Francis |
| Grégory Carnoli | Man of the Italian couple |
| Aza Declercq | Injured woman |
| Adrienne D'Anna | Italian lady |
| Antonio Cecchinato | Italian ambassador |
| Dino Delli Compagni | Gaetano Cassisi |
| Jeroen Van der Ven | Thomas Verbruggen |
| Joe Bunting | Liverpool player 2 |
| Josse Colsoul | International reporter |
| Carl-Philipp Wengler | International journalist |
| Andrea Abbracciante | Italian supporter |
| John R. Bullen | Paul Walker (UK journalist) |
| Robert Cionca | International journalist |
| Mark Henry Cunningham | English journalist |
| Julian De Backer | Broadcasting director |
| Quinten Delaere | Injured person |
| Julien Jakout | Photographer |
| Sabrina Lopez Leonard | Journalist |
| Jason McLarnin | Liverpool player 1 |
| Michael J. Sanderson | Italian producer |
| Ana Luisa Santos | Journalist |
| Nicolas Schmits | French gendarme |
| Letizia Trunfio | Italian woman |
| Samuel Van Greuningen | UK journalist |
| Liam van Pul | Young gendarme |

== Production ==
In December 2024, it was announced that the production received financial support from Screen Flanders. In February 2025, it was confirmed that Matteo Simoni had been cast in the lead role. The film was directed by Teodora Ana Mihai and produced by Menuetto Film in co-production with Les Films du Fleuve, Topkapi Films, and Leitwolf Filmproduktion. Support was provided by the Flanders Audiovisual Fund (VAF), the Belgian Tax shelter, and the Netherlands Film Fund.

=== Filming ===
Principal photography took place primarily in Flanders, specifically in Antwerp. Filming was completed in early May 2025, coinciding with the 40th anniversary of the disaster.

== Release ==
Heysel 85 premiered in February 2026 at the 76th Berlin International Film Festival in the "Berlinale Special" section. Leading actress Violet Braeckman was selected as a "European Shooting Star" 2026. The film is scheduled for a theatrical release in Belgium in the fall of 2026.

The film will have its Asian Premiere at the 39th Tokyo International Film Festival on October 26, 2026 in International competition.

== Reception ==
Following its premiere at the 76th Berlin International Film Festival, Heysel 85 received mixed reviews from critics. While the film's visual style and claustrophobic atmosphere were widely praised, its screenplay and characterization drew significant criticism.

Critics frequently highlighted the film's technical achievements. Shahrbanoo Golmohamadi of Gazettely gave the film a 7.5 out of 10, praising the "visceral 16mm cinematography" and the "exceptional sound design," noting that the blend of staged scenes with 1985 archival footage created a strong sense of dread. OutNow similarly commended the accurate 1980s aesthetic and the palpable feeling of helplessness conveyed in the stadium's catacombs.

However, the film's narrative choices were heavily criticized, particularly the depiction of the Brussels mayor. Björn Becher of Filmstarts gave the film 1 out of 5 stars, describing the mayor's portrayal as a "cheap caricature" and arguing that the film simplified complex historical failures into a grotesque exaggeration. Carsten Baumgardt of Kino-Total agreed, stating that while the film was formally strong, the striking personalization of structural failure through a drunken mayor trivialized the actual events. Diego Gil of Cinemagavia felt the film lacked rhythm and remained trapped in conventional cinematic tropes, ultimately making it unmemorable.

== Awards and nominations ==
| Year | Award | Category | Nominee(s) | Result |
|---|---|---|---|---|
| 2026 | Berlin International Film Festival | European Shooting Star | Violet Braeckman | Won |
