= Hu Ling =

Chinese actress (born 1975)

- Born: January 1, 1975 (age 51); Dongcheng, Beijing, China
- Other name: Hu Lingling (Chinese: 胡灵灵)
- Education: Beijing Film Academy
- Occupation: Actress

Chinese name
- Chinese: 胡伶
Transcriptions
Standard Mandarin
- Hanyu Pinyin: Hú Líng

Hu Ling (Chinese: 胡伶; pinyin: Hú Líng; born January 1, 1975) is a Chinese actress. She is known for her role as Li Ti in Lou Ye's Summer Palace (2006). She won the Best Actress award at the 39th Tokyo International Film Festival for The Night That Binds Us (2026).

== Early life ==
Hu was born in Dongcheng, Beijing. She graduated from the Beijing Film Academy.

== Career ==
In 2006, Hu starred in Lou Ye's romance film Summer Palace, which premiered in Competition at the 59th Cannes Film Festival. In 2021, Hu starred in the short film Lili Alone, which was selected for the Critics' Week section of the 74th Cannes Film Festival. In 2023, Hu was nominated for Best Leading Actress at the 60th Golden Horse Awards for her role in Carp Leaping Over Dragon's Gate, marking her first nomination for an acting award. Hu became the first Chinese actress to attend the ceremony since 2019, when China boycotted the awards show. In 2026, Hu starred in Big Little Things and Gu Shi, both of which premiered at the 83rd Venice International Film Festival, respectively in the Orizzonti section and the Biennale College Cinema programme. In the same year, she played a grieving middle-aged dormitory manager in The Night That Binds Us, which was selected for the main competition at the 39th Tokyo International Film Festival. Elizabeth Kerr of Screen Daily praised Hu for being "so luminously engaging, brave and grounded" and believed the film "is buoyed by compelling starring performance by Hu". Hu received the Best Actress award for her performance in the film.

== Filmography ==
=== Film ===
Year	Title	Original title	Role	Ref.
1999	Lunar Eclipse	月蚀	Qi Hong	
2000	Leak	Lek	Loempiaverkoopster	
2006	Summer Palace	颐和园	Li Ti	
2019	The Shadow Play	风中有朵雨做的云	Ms Hu	
2023	Carp Leaping Over Dragon's Gate	菠萝，凤梨	Mother	
2026	Big Little Things	謊言生活		
2026	Gu Shi	故事		
2026	The Night That Binds Us	略知她一二	An	

=== Short film ===
Year	Title	Original title	Role	Ref.
2021	Lili Alone	朵丽		

=== Television series ===
Year	Title	Original title	Role	Ref.
2002	Love Through Different Times	穿越时空的爱恋	Ji Shufei	
2007	Ming Dynasty in 1566	大明王朝1566	Hai Rui's wife	
2015	Youth Assemble	青春集结号	Zhao Huixia (Ye's mother)	
2021	A ba yi jia ren	阿坝一家人		
2025	The Embers	余烬之上	Cai Na's mother	

== Awards and nominations ==
Award	Year	Category	Work	Result	Ref.
Golden Horse Awards	2023	Best Leading Actress	Carp Leaping Over Dragon's Gate	Nominated	
Tokyo International Film Festival	2026	Best Actress	The Night That Binds Us	Won	
