= Double Freedom =

2026 drama film by Lisandro Alonso

- Spanish: La Libertad Doble
- Directed by: Lisandro Alonso
- Written by: Lisandro Alonso
- Produced by: Fernando Bascuñán; Augusto Matte; Lisandro Alonso
- Starring: Misael Saavedra; Catalina Saavedra
- Cinematography: Cobi Migliora
- Edited by: Catalina Marín; Martín Mainoli; Manuel Ferrari
- Music by: Peter Rosenthal
- Production companies: Planta; Deptford Film; 4L; Les Films Fauves; The Match Factory; Cimarrón; Pulpa Film; Carte Blanche
- Release date: 16 May 2026 (Cannes)
- Running time: 100 minutes
- Countries: Argentina; Chile; Luxemburg; Germany; United Kingdom
- Language: Spanish

Double Freedom (Spanish: La Libertad Doble) is a 2026 slow cinema film written and directed by Lisandro Alonso. Starring Misael Saavedra as Misael, it's a direct sequel to Freedom (2001), and follows the precarious work conditions of rural workers in Argentina 25 years later.

The film had its world premiere at the Directors' Fortnight section of the 2026 Cannes Film Festival on 16 May.

== Cast ==
- Misael Saavedra as Misael
- Catalina Saavedra as Micaela
- Adrián Fondari as Doctor
- Alcides Fink
- Laura López Moyano

== Production ==
A co-production between Argentina, Chile, Luxembourg, Germany and the United Kingdom. It's produced by Planta, Deptford Film, and 4L. Co-produced by: Les Films Fauves, The Match Factory, Cimarrón, Pulpa Film, and Carte Blanche. Supported by: Fondo de Fomento Audiovisual de Chile, Film Fund Luxembourg, Berlinale World Cinema Fund, and Jeonju International Film Festival.

Cinematographer Cobi Migliora shot the film in 35mm, marking his third collaboration with Alonso.

== Release ==
The film had its world premiere at the Directors' Fortnight section of the 2026 Cannes Film Festival on 16 May. Marking Alonso's seventh feature film to debut in the Cannes Film Festival. It will have its North American premiere in the Wavelengths section of the 2026 Toronto International Film Festival, and was also selected for the Main Slate of the 2026 New York Film Festival.

World sales are handled by Luxbox.
