= Will You Still Be My Friend =

2026 Taiwanese drama film

- Promotional poster
- Chinese: 日光
- Directed by: Lu Po-shun
- Screenplay by: Lu Po-shun; Chen Chia-ping
- Produced by: Su Yu-Hao; Chou Tseng-Chen
- Starring: Jaden Wang; Aloysius Looi; Lung Tien Hsiang; Chang Zhang-xing; Lu Yi-ching; Andie Chen; Kate Pang
- Cinematography: Shyan Tan
- Edited by: Huang Paulie Chih-Chia; Lu Po-Shun
- Music by: Tseng Yun-Fang
- Production companies: Verdant Peak Films; InLight Film Studio
- Distributed by: Moveria
- Release date: 19 September 2026 (SSIFF)
- Running time: 100 minutes
- Countries: Taiwan; Singapore
- Languages: Mandarin; English

Will You Still Be My Friend (Chinese: 日光) is a 2026 Taiwanese-Singaporean coming-of-age drama film co-written and directed by Lu Po-shun in his debut feature. It expands on his short "When Henge Meets Crescent", which is part of the Public Television Service's pandemic anthology "Quarantini." Set in Yunlin County on Taiwan's southwest coast, the film follows two boys, a local Taiwanese boy and his best friend from Singapore, whose friendship is challenged as disputes over village issues, regional politics and solar energy projects divide their community.

It premiered at the 74th San Sebastián International Film Festival on 19 September 2026 and competed for Kutxabank-New Directors Award in 'New Directors' section.

== Synopsis ==
Jun, a naive 13-year-old boy from a village in southern Taiwan, shares a close friendship with Ting, a boy who moved there from Singapore with his parents. Ting's family has started buying land to build solar farms, causing tensions with local villagers. As the conflict between the two groups grows, Jun tries to help Ting become accepted by the local boys. The situation worsens when Jun's grandfather, the village chief who has been accused of corruption, refuses to support Ting's parents. In retaliation, they report him to the police. As the adults' dispute grows, Jun and Ting's friendship is put under increasing pressure.

== Cast ==
- Jaden Wang
- Aloysius Looi
- Lung Tien Hsiang
- Lu Yi-ching
- Andie Chen
- Kate Pang
- Chang Zhang-xing

== Release ==
Will You Still Be My Friend was presented in the 'New Directors' section of the 74th San Sebastián International Film Festival on 19 September 2026.

It was screened in 'A Window on Asian Cinema' section of the 31st Busan International Film Festival on 7 October 2026. It will also be screened in 'Departure' section at the 62nd Chicago International Film Festival on 23 October 2026. On 26 October it will close the Kaohsiung Film Festival and have its Taiwanese premiere.

Paris-based Moveria acquired the international sales rights before its San Sebastián International Film Festival premiere.

== Reception ==
In his review at San Sebastián International Film Festival, Matthew Joseph Jenner of the International Cinephile Society rated the film with 3 stars out of five and described the film as a moving portrayal of two teenagers who find a sense of belonging through an unexpected friendship. He praised Lu Po-Shun's restrained depiction of adolescence and the uncertainty of discovering one's identity and place in a changing world. Although he found the ending deliberately ambiguous, he considered it meaningful in its suggestion that some friendships may be temporary while still having a lasting influence on people's lives. In his conclusion Jenner praised the film's sincerity, restraint and melancholic treatment of growing up, calling it a conventional story told with "incredible restraint" and finding in it "the wonderful power of a simple and resonant story told well."

== Accolades ==
Award	Date of ceremony	Category	Recipient	Result	Ref.
San Sebastián International Film Festival	26 September 2026	Kutxabank-New Directors Award	Will You Still Be My Friend	Nominated	
Golden Horse Awards	22 November 2026	Best Adapted Screenplay	Lu Po-shun, Chen Chia-ping	Nominated	
Golden Horse Awards	22 November 2026	Best New Performer	Jaden Wang	Nominated	
