= Grand Jeté =

- Official poster
- Directed by: Isabelle Stever
- Written by: Anna Melikova
- Based on: Fürsorge by Anke Stelling
- Produced by: Mohammad Farokhmanesh; Frank Geiger; Armin Hoffmann
- Starring: Sarah Nevada Grether; Emil von Schönfels
- Cinematography: Constantin Campean
- Edited by: Paul Gröbel; Jil Lange
- Music by: Thomas Mehlhorn; Sigourney Pilz
- Release date: September 23, 2022 (United States)
- Running time: 105 minutes
- Country: Germany
- Language: German

Grand Jeté is a 2022 German drama film written by Anna Melikova, directed by Isabelle Stever and starring Sarah Nevada Grether and Emil von Schönfels. It is based on the novel Fürsorge by Anke Stelling.

== Plot ==
The film follows Nadja, a former ballet dancer whose entire existence has been shaped by her commitment to her art. From a young age, Nadja was conditioned to prioritize perfection in her movements, body, and discipline, sacrificing personal relationships and normal life experiences in pursuit of excellence. However, this relentless dedication has come at a severe cost: Nadja's body is breaking down, worn from years of pushing past physical limitations. Chronic pain plagues her every step, and she relies on painkillers to keep up with the demands of teaching dance. Her world is rigid, structured, and devoid of emotional connections, until she reconnects with Mario, the son she gave up long ago.

Nadja’s body shows the physical effects of her years as a dancer: her feet are calloused and bloody, and her skin shows signs of stress and deterioration. Teaching ballet is the only thing that remains from her former life as a dancer, but even that is a constant reminder of the discipline that consumed her youth.

Despite her deep connection to the art form, Nadja is emotionally detached from the people around her, including her students and colleagues. She lives in a state of emotional suppression, never allowing herself to truly experience closeness with others. Her sense of control is absolute, until she decides to visit her estranged family.

Nadja’s mother, Hanne, raised Mario in Nadja’s absence. For years, Nadja’s decision to step away from motherhood was not questioned; she was devoted to ballet, and raising a child was an obstacle to her ambitions. Mario, now a young man, grew up without truly knowing his mother, and their relationship is virtually non-existent.

When Nadja arrives at her mother’s home, the atmosphere is filled with unease. Hanne is somewhat distant and quietly judgmental, while Mario seems indifferent to Nadja’s sudden appearance in his life. However, as Nadja spends more time around him, an inexplicable fascination begins to form.

Mario, in contrast to Nadja, has built his own life around physicality, but in a different way, he is obsessed with body modification, fitness, and sculpting his physique. His body, like Nadja’s, is his main focus, but instead of discipline and control, his interest is rooted in aesthetics and transformation. The two of them share an unspoken connection, both shaped by an obsession with their bodies, yet separated by years of distance and unfamiliarity.

What begins as casual and awkward interactions soon evolves into something far more unsettling. Nadja finds herself drawn to Mario, not in the way a mother reconnects with her child, but in an entirely different and inappropriate manner. She studies his form, observes his movements, and becomes increasingly fixated on his presence. There is a strange, growing tension between them, one that neither fully acknowledges at first, but is impossible to ignore.

Mario, in turn, does not resist Nadja’s presence in his life. Instead, he allows the relationship to shift in an unspoken direction, neither rejecting nor questioning the changes in their dynamic. As the tension escalates, they engage in a taboo-breaking sexual relationship, an act that defies societal norms and crosses a deeply unsettling boundary.

The film does not present this relationship with melodrama or moralization. Instead, it depicts it with an almost clinical detachment, allowing the audience to observe the consequences of the characters’ choices without overt judgment. Their connection is not romantic in the traditional sense; rather, it is rooted in an intense physical and psychological dependency.

For Nadja, the relationship with Mario is not just an act of transgression but an extension of her lifelong struggle with control. Having spent her entire life repressing emotions and prioritizing bodily discipline, this relationship represents an unraveling, a moment where she allows herself to feel, even if it is in the most unsettling way possible.

Mario, on the other hand, does not resist or question the inappropriateness of the situation. He, too, is drawn to Nadja in a way that defies logic. Their relationship is one that exists outside of conventional morality, existing solely in the space they have created for themselves.

As the film progresses, their entanglement deepens, but there is an ever-present sense of doom hanging over them. This is not a story of love, redemption, or reconciliation; it is a story of bodies, boundaries, and the devastating consequences of a life spent in isolation.

== Cast ==
- Sarah Nevada Grether as Nadja
- Emil von Schönfels as Mario
- Susanne Bredehöft as Hanne
- Stefan Rudolf as Daniel
- Maya Kornev as Sofia
- Carl Hegemann as Herrmann
- Jule Böwe as Doris
- Eva Medusa Gühne as Annegret
- Sina Koburg as Studio Girl
- Lukas Lonski as Moderator
- Anke Stelling as Midwife

== Release ==
The film was released in theaters in the United States on September 23, 2022.

== Reception ==
Beth Accomando of the Alliance of Women Film Journalists gave the film a positive review and wrote, "Grand Jeté is definitely worth a watch if only for the commitment Stever and Grether make to the art they are creating."

Carlos Aguilar of TheWrap also gave the film a positive review and wrote that it "deals with the transgression of the flesh but remains impartial to the actions of its characters, arguing that bodily pleasure and the outcome of said enjoyment don’t abide by the rules of morality."

Wendy Ide of Screen International also gave the film a positive review, calling it "a charged portrait of a sexual relationship between an older woman and a young man."
