= Red Before Dawn =

2026 historical drama film by Garin Nugroho

- Promotional poster
- Indonesian: Merah Sebelum Fajar
- Directed by: Garin Nugroho
- Written by: Dirmawan Hatta; Garin Nugroho
- Produced by: Nicholas Saputra
- Starring: Nicholas Saputra; Laura Basuki; Bront Palarae
- Cinematography: Larry Manda
- Edited by: Sastha Sunu
- Music by: Mondo Gascaro
- Production companies: Atarui Films; Jagartha; Springboard
- Release date: 27 October 2026 (TIFF)
- Running time: 102 minutes
- Country: Indonesia
- Language: Indonesian

Red Before Dawn (Indonesian: Merah Sebelum Fajar) is a 2026 Indonesian historical drama film co-written and directed by Garin Nugroho. Starring, Nicholas Saputra and set in 1946 Indonesia, amid ongoing turmoil after independence, it follows a young geologist, who sets out on a mission from Sumatra to Yogyakarta to deliver investigative documents.

The film had its World Premiere at the 39th Tokyo International Film Festival on 27 October 2026 in International competition.

== Synopsis ==
Set in Indonesia in 1946, one year after the country declared independence, the film follows Frans, a young geologist, and four other people from different social backgrounds. The group undertakes a dangerous journey across the country to deliver an important investigative document from Sumatra to Yogyakarta. As they travel through difficult terrain, they encounter various dangers and obstacles, while also struggling with distrust and suspicion among people who are fighting for the same cause.

== Cast ==
- Nicholas Saputra as Frans
- Laura Basuki
- Bront Palarae
- Tissa Biani
- Nagra Pakusadewo

== Release ==
Red Before Dawn was screened for the World Premiere on 27 October 2026 in the Competition section of the 39th Tokyo International Film Festival.

== Accolades ==
Award	Date of ceremony	Category	Recipient	Result	Ref.
Tokyo International Film Festival	4 November 2026	Tokyo Grand Prix	Red Before Dawn	Nominated	
