= Germany 09: 13 Short Films About the State of the Nation =

Germany 09: 13 Short Films About The State Of The Nation
- Theatrical release poster
- Directed by: Fatih Akin, Wolfgang Becker, Sylke Enders, Dominik Graf, Martin Gressmann, Christoph Hochhäusler, Romuald Karmakar, Nicolette Krebitz, Dani Levy, Angela Schanelec, Hans Steinbichler, Isabelle Stever, Tom Tykwer, Hans Weingartner
- Produced by: Dirk Wilutzky
- Production companies: Herbstfilm Produktion GmbH, NDR – Norddeutscher Rundfunk
- Distributed by: Piffl Medien Filmverleih
- Release date: March 26, 2009
- Running time: 140 min
- Country: Germany

Germany 09 (German: Deutschland 09 – 13 kurze Filme zur Lage der Nation) is a German anthology film composed of 13 short films that contemplated the state of Germany at the time. It was conceived as a rejoinder to the 1977 anthology film Germany in Autumn (composed of shorts directed by 11 different filmmakers, including Rainer Werner Fassbinder, Edgar Reitz and Volker Schlöndorff) after 30 years of German history have passed.

== Shorts ==
According to the film's official website, "Each of the participating directors interprets his personal perception and his own cinematic view of contemporary Germany, abstractly or concretely, freely in the choice of format and content. The individual contributions could be short feature films, documentary films, essayistic or experimental."

Segment	Director(s)	Writer(s)
The Name Murat Kurnaz (German: Der Name Murat Kurnaz)	Fatih Akin	
Sick House (German: Krankes Haus)	Wolfgang Becker	
Lopsided (German: Schieflage)	Sylke Enders	
The Way We Do Not Go Together (German: Der Weg, den wir nicht zusammen gehen)	Dominik Graf & Martin Gressmann	
Séance	Christoph Hochhäusler	
Ramses	Romuald Karmakar	
The Unfinished (German: Die Unvollendete)	Nicolette Krebitz	
Joshua	Dany Levy	
First Day (German: Erster Tag)	Angela Schanelec	
Fracture (German: Fraktur)	Hans Steinbichler	
A Democratic Round Table at Scheduled Times (German: Eine Demokratische Gesprächsrunde zu festgelegten Zeiten)	Isabelle Stever	
Festive Travel (German: Feierlich reist)	Tom Tykwer	
Endangerers (German: Gefährder)	Hans Weingartner	
