= Until the Day Ends =

2026 film by Jelena Maksimović

- Serbian: Do kraja dana
- Directed by: Jelena Maksimović
- Written by: Jelena Maksimović; Olga Dimitrijević; Ivan Salatić
- Produced by: Jelena Angelovski
- Starring: Lena Trifunović; Andrija Krivokapić; Irina Hotomski; Stefan Tarabić; Nataša Čakardić; Miodrag Dragičević
- Cinematography: Paul Spengemann
- Edited by: Jan Klemsche
- Production company: Taurunum Film
- Release date: 10 September 2026 (Venice)
- Running time: 91 minutes
- Countries: Serbia; Bulgaria; Slovenia; Montenegro; Croatia; Germany
- Language: Serbo-Croatian

Until the Day Ends (Serbian: Do kraja dana) is a 2026 coming-of-age drama film directed by Jelena Maksimović, in her feature directorial debut, and co-written with Olga Dimitrijević and Ivan Salatić. A co-production between Serbia, Bulgaria, Slovenia, Montenegro, Croatia, and Germany, it follows Lena (Lena Trifunović) and Stefan (Andrija Krivokapić), two young people on opposing sides of the Serbian anti-corruption protests.

The film had its world premiere in the Orizzonti section of the 83rd Venice International Film Festival on 10 September 2026.

== Premise ==
Set against the backdrop of the Serbian anti-corruption protests, it follows an anarchist student and a pro-government young man as they flee Belgrade.

== Cast ==
- Lena Trifunović as Lena
- Andrija Krivokapić as Stefan
- Irina Hotomski as Slavna
- Stefan Tarabić as Nemanja
- Nataša Čakardić as Marijana
- Miodrag Dragičević as Milan, Lena's brother

== Production ==
In January 2022, the project participated at the 12th When East Meets West co-production forum. Jelena Maksimović developed the screenplay at the 2022 TorinoFilmLab through its ScriptLab initiative. In December 2025, the project was presented at the Les Arcs Film Festival's Work in Progress showcase. It was selected for the 2026 edition of Uniqa See Future Foundation's Female Filmmakers Support Programme.

Principal photography took place for twenty days over July and August 2025 in Belgrade, Zemun, Novi Sad, and Deliblato Sands, Serbia.

== Release ==
Until the Day Ends had its world premiere at the Orizzonti section of the 83rd Venice International Film Festival on 10 September 2026. Prior to its premiere, it was reported that Heretic had acquired the film's sales rights.

The film will have its Asian Premiere at the 39th Tokyo International Film Festival on October 31, 2026 in International competition.
