= Silver Express =

2026 Japanese film

- Promotional poster
- Japanese: シルバー・エクスプレス
- Directed by: Miki Tanaka
- Screenplay by: Miki Tanaka
- Produced by: Takatoshi Naoi; Tomonori Akiyama; Koji Fujii
- Starring: Hayato Kurihara; Riho Nakamura; Yui Okamoto; Tatsuya Yamawaki
- Cinematography: Kohei Tatsutomi
- Edited by: BUNNY FAN FAN
- Music by: Kazutoshi Kusada
- Production company: Libertas Inc
- Distributed by: KeyHolder Pictures
- Release dates: October 10, 2026 (BIFF); November 13, 2026 (Japan)
- Running time: 97 minutes
- Country: Japan
- Language: Japanese

Silver Express (Japanese: シルバー・エクスプレス) is a 2026 Japanese drama film written and directed by Miki Tanaka in her debut feature. Starring Okamoto Yui, it follows Chieri, a young woman who has never experienced romantic or sexual attraction.

The film had its world premiere and competed in the Competition section of the 31st Busan International Film Festival on October 10, 2026 for 'Busan Awards'.

== Synopsis ==
Chieri is a young woman who has never experienced romantic or sexual attraction. She struggles to relate to the romantic expectations of society and has difficulty connecting with her friends, understanding romantic films, and responding to the affection of male friends. Her life changes when she meets Shoya, a man who also does not experience romantic attraction. The two develop a connection based on their shared experiences, but their relationship is complicated by differences in their experiences of attraction. While Chieri is asexual, Shoya is aromantic and experiences physical desire that Chieri does not reciprocate.

== Cast ==
- Hayato Kurihara as Shoya
- Yui Okamoto as Chieri
- Riho Nakamura
- Tatsuya Yamawaki
- Kengo Kora
- Yō Yoshida
- Rio Takahashi
- Yuka Nakajima
- Tomomi Nakai
- Rina Saito
- Yoshiro Sakuma
- Keisuke Otak

== Release ==
Silver Express had its World Premiere in the Competition section of the 31st Busan International Film Festival on October 10, 2026 and vied for 'Busan Awards'.

It was screened in the Nippon Cinema Now section of 39th Tokyo International Film Festival on November 1, 2026, where it won Best Film prize.

The film was initially planned for release on November 13, 2026 in Japanese theatres by KeyHolder Pictures. However, the release date was postponed until further notice due to the temporary closure of the Shinjuku Musashino-kan theatre, where it was set to premiere.

== Accolades ==
The film competed for various Vision Awards at Busan International Film Festival.

Award	Date of ceremony	Category	Recipient(s)	Result	Ref.
Busan International Film Festival	October 15, 2026	Busan Awards: Best Film	Silver Express	Nominated	
Tokyo International Film Festival	November 4, 2026	Nippon Cinema Now: Best Film	Miki Tanaka	Won	
