= I Rarely Wake Up Dreaming =

2026 drama film by Isabelle Stever

- Theatrical release poster
- German: Selten wache ich träumend auf
- Directed by: Isabelle Stever
- Written by: Anna Melikova
- Produced by: Uwe Schott; Tom Tykwer
- Starring: Tania Myronyshena; Markus Bright; Iryna Mak; Viktor Zhdanov; Maiia Sobolevska; Maria Myronyshena; Oleksandr Rudynskyi
- Cinematography: Volodymyr Usyk
- Edited by: Paul Groebel; Laura Lauzemis
- Production companies: X Filme Creative Pool; Westdeutscher Rundfunk; 2Brave Productions; Magic Media Production
- Distributed by: X Verleih AG (through Warner Bros.)
- Release date: 9 August 2026 (Locarno)
- Running time: 100 minutes
- Countries: Germany; Ukraine
- Language: Ukrainian

I Rarely Wake Up Dreaming (German: Selten wache ich träumend auf) is a 2026 drama film directed by Isabelle Stever, and written by Anna Melikova. It stars Tania Myronyshena, Markus Bright, Iryna Mak, Viktor Zhdanov, Maiia Sobolevska, Maria Myronyshena and Oleksandr Rudynskyi.

The film had its world premiere at the main competition of the 79th Locarno Film Festival on 9 August 2026, where it competed for the Golden Leopard.

== Premise ==
A young couple is put to the test when one of the partners gender transition collides with the Russo-Ukrainian war (2022–present).

== Cast ==
- Tania Myronyshena as Olya
- Markus Bright as Oleh
- Iryna Mak as Maryna
- Viktor Zhdanov as Vasyl
- Maiia Sobolevska as Rada
- Maria Myronyshena as Dasha
- Oleksandr Rudynskyi as Pavel

== Release ==
It had its world premiere at the 79th Locarno Film Festival on 9 August 2026, competing for the Golden Leopard. It will also be screened in the Main Slate of the 2026 New York Film Festival on 6 October.

The film will be screened for Japanese Premiere on 29 October 2026 in the Women’s Empowerment section of the 39th Tokyo International Film Festival.
