= Jauja (film) =

2014 film

- International promotional poster
- Directed by: Lisandro Alonso
- Written by: Fabian Casas; Lisandro Alonso
- Produced by: Ilse Hughan; Viggo Mortensen; Sylvie Pialat; Jaime Romandia; Helle Ulsteen
- Starring: Viggo Mortensen; Viilbjørk Malling Agger; Ghita Nørby; Adrián Fondari; Esteban Bigliardi; Diego Román
- Cinematography: Timo Salminen
- Edited by: Gonzalo del Val; Natalia López
- Music by: Viggo Mortensen
- Production companies: 4L; Estudios Splendor Omnia; Fortuna Films; Kamoli Films; Les Films du Worso; Mantarraya Producciones; Massive; Perceval Pictures; The Match Factory; Bananeira Filmes; Canal Brasil
- Distributed by: Distribution Company (Argentina); Eye Film Institute (Netherlands); Le Pacte (France)
- Release dates: 18 May 2014 (Cannes); 27 November 2014 (Argentina)
- Running time: 110 minutes
- Countries: Denmark; Argentina; France; Mexico; Brazil; Netherlands; United States
- Languages: Danish; Spanish; French
- Budget: ARS 3 million
- Box office: $1.2 million

Jauja is a 2014 historical drama film directed by Lisandro Alonso, co-written with Fabian Casas. Starring Viggo Mortensen (also producer and composer), it follows Gunnar Dinesen, a Danish settler in Patagonia, and his young daughter Ingeborg (Viilbjørk Malling Agger).

The film had its world premiere at the Un Certain Regard section of the 2014 Cannes Film Festival on 18 May, where it won the FIPRESCI Prize. It was theatrically released in Argentina on 27 November.

== Plot ==
In the 1880s, Danish Captain Gunnar Dinesen is in Argentina with his teenage daughter Ingeborg who asks him if she can have a dog—one that will follow her wherever she goes. Dinesen is propositioned by the rutting Lieutenant Pittaluga who asks him for permission to take Inge to a dance in exchange for one of his horses. In clumsy Spanish Dinesen refuses, stating that Inge is his daughter. When Dinesen warns Inge that Pittaluga is too fond of young girls and she should not go near him, she asks why she ever would.

Unbeknownst to her father, Inge is already involved with a young soldier named Corto. Corto tells Pittaluga and Dinesen about the rumors that Zuluaga, an officer who inexplicably disappeared into the desert, is leading a group of bandits and wearing a woman's dress. The men tell Corto to go into the desert and bring them something tangible as proof that Zuluaga is still alive.

During the night Inge and Corto run off together. Though Pittaluga offers to retrieve Inge, Dinesen insists on going alone. Heading out into the desert he eventually encounters a mortally wounded man whispering the name Zuluaga. He later finds the dying Corto, with his throat cut, and demands of him the whereabouts of his daughter. Laying aside his rifle and hat, Dinesen with revolver in hand goes to investigate a suspicious sound. While the distraught Dinesen investigates the area near the helpless Corto, his hat and rifle are stolen by one of the natives. Dinesen comes back to Corto's body and finishes the job of killing Corto with his sword. The native fires a shot at Dinesen with the rifle and then rides his horse away, and Dinesen is forced to continue on foot through the inhospitable desert. Driven onward in the search for his daughter, he continues on in the direction the indigenous man went.

As Dinesen wanders through the desert, he sees a dog who leads him first to a toy soldier that Corto had given to Inge and then to a Danish-speaking elderly woman who lives in a cave. She tells him her husband died of a snake bite. Captain Dinesen tells the woman that he is looking for his daughter and, as the conversation unfolds, it is gradually revealed that the woman is his daughter. She tells him to come back whenever he likes and he wanders out into the desert again.

In the present day, a young girl wakes up in a mansion in Denmark and goes to see her dogs. She is distressed by the fact that one dog has been scratching his fur off and the hound-keeper tells her it is because he is nervous and perplexed by her long absences. The girl takes the dog for a walk in the woods around her home and finds a toy soldier on the ground. She picks it up, and then hearing a sound from her dog, she goes to look for him. Finding only ripples spreading on a pond and no sign of the dog, Ingeborg casts the toy soldier into the pond.

== Cast ==
- Viggo Mortensen as Gunnar Dinesen
- Viilbjørk Malling Agger as Ingeborg Dinesen
- Ghita Nørby as woman in cave
- Adrián Fondari as Lieutenant Pittaluga
- Esteban Bigliardi as Angel Milkibar
- Brian Patterson as dog man

== Production ==
A co-production between Argentina, Denmark, France, Mexico, Brazil, Netherlands and United States, it's produced by 4L, Estudios Splendor Omnia, Fortuna Films, Kamoli Films, Les Films du Worso, Mantarraya Producciones, Massive, Perceval Pictures and The Match Factory. In co-production with Bananeira Filmes and Canal Brasil. In assossiation with Arte, and support of Centre national du cinéma et de l'image animée (CNC) and Instituto Nacional de Cine y Artes Audiovisuales (INCAA).

== Release ==
Jauga was screened in the Un Certain Regard section at the 2014 Cannes Film Festival on 18 May 2014, where it won the FIPRESCI Prize. It was also selected to the 2014 Toronto International Film Festival, and to the mains slate of the 52nd New York Film Festival. In the UK, it screened at the Wales One World Film Festival in March 2015.

It was released in cinemas in Argentina by Distribution Company on 27 November 2014.

== Reception ==
=== Box office ===
It grossed $1.2 million at the worldwide box office.

=== Critical response ===
Jauja received positive reviews from critics. as of February 2018, on Rotten Tomatoes, the film had a rating of 89%, based on 61 reviews, with an average rating of 7.3/10. The site's critical consensus reads, "Jauja will prove haunting for those lured in by its deliberate pace and lovely visuals, though it may test some viewers' patience." On Metacritic (July 2017), the film has a score of 77 out of 100, based on 19 critics, indicating "generally favorable" reviews.

Slant Magazine's Jake Cole gave the film three-and-a-half stars and described it as "refreshingly absurdist".

== See also ==
- Garmr
