= Eureka (2023 film) =

2023 drama film by Lisandro Alonso

- International promotional poster
- Directed by: Lisandro Alonso
- Written by: Fabian Casas; Lisandro Alonso; Martín Caamaño
- Produced by: Marianne Slot; Carine Leblanc
- Starring: Viggo Mortensen; José María Yazpik; Chiara Mastroianni
- Cinematography: Timo Salminen; Mauro Herce
- Edited by: Gonzalo del Val
- Music by: Domingo Cura
- Production companies: 4L; Luxbox; Komplizen Film; Woo Films; Rosa Filmes; Pina Films; Talipot Studio
- Distributed by: Le Pacte (France)
- Release dates: 19 May 2023 (Cannes); 28 February 2024 (France)
- Running time: 146 minutes
- Countries: France; Germany; Portugal; Mexico; Argentina
- Languages: English; Lakota; Portuguese
- Budget: $2 million
- Box office: $22,246

Eureka is a 2023 triptych drama film directed by Lisandro Alonso, co-written with Fabian Casas and Martín Caamaño. Starring Viggo Mortensen, José María Yazpik and Chiara Mastroianni, it follows Eureka, a woman who became a migratory Jabiru and connects indigenous history between 1870 and 2019 in the Americas.

The film had its world premiere at the Cannes Premiere section of the 2023 Cannes Film Festival on 19 May. It was theatrically released in France by Le Pacte on 28 February 2024. It received positive reviews.

== Synopsis ==
Eureka is a Jabiru, a species of stork, that flies across different geographies of the American continent; in its flights, it also travels through time. The film is narrated in three distinct sections. It examines the indigenous peoples of the Americas and how they have inhabited their specific environments across the centuries.

The film's first part, entitled 'Western', takes place in a lawless township on the US-Mexico border in 1870, and follows Murphy, a father searching for his kidnapped daughter.

== Cast ==
- Viggo Mortensen as Murphy
- Chiara Mastroianni as El Coronel / Maya
- Alaina Clifford as Officer Debonna
- Sadie Lapointe as Sadie
- Viilbjørk Malling Agger as Molly
- Luísa Cruz as Nun
- Rafi Pitts as Randall
- Santiago Fumagalli as the receptionist
- Natalia Ruiz as the prostitute
- Adanilo Costa as a Brazilian indigenous who disappears
- José María Yazpik

== Production ==
France's Luxbox was the lead producer, with Germany's Komplizen Film and Portugal's Rosa Filmes serving as their fellow European co-producers. 4L and Pina Films produced for Argentina and Mexico, respectively, with Luxbox also controlling international sales.

In August 2020, the cast of the film, including Viggo Mortensen, Chiara Mastroianni, Maria de Medeiros, Viilbjørk Malling Agger, and others were confirmed.

In November 2021, production for Lisandro Alonso's sixth feature film started. Eureka began shooting in Almería, Spain.

== Release ==
The film premiered at the 2023 Cannes Film Festival in the Cannes Premiere section on May 19, 2023. It was also invited to the Munich International Film Festival, where it competed in the Film Competition Cinemasters section on June 26, 2023. In July, it was screened at the New Horizons Film Festival in the Masters section on July 20 July 2023. In August, it competed in the 27th Lima Film Festival, where it won the Special Jury Prize. In the same month, it was invited to the Melbourne International Film Festival and was screened on August 5. It was screened at the 28th Busan International Film Festival in the Icon section on October 8; then at the 2023 New York Film Festival in the Main Slate on October 10; and on October 20 at the Vienna International Film Festival in the Features section. Then it was screened at the 18th Rome Film Festival in the same month. It was also selected in the Kaleidoscope section at the 54th International Film Festival of India and screened on November 21 and November 24.

It was released by Le Pacte on 28 February 2024 in French theatres.

The film was also screened at the CPH:DOX on 14 March 2024 in Parafiction section, and on 1 April 2024 at the 48th Hong Kong International Film Festival in Auteurs section. It made to New/Next Film Festival, where it was screened on 4 October 2024.

== Reception ==
On the review aggregator Rotten Tomatoes website, the film has an approval rating of 83% based on 40 reviews, with an average rating of 6.7 out of 10. On the AlloCiné, which lists 18 press reviews, the film obtained an average rating of 3.8/5.

David Katz, reviewing for Cineuropa praised the film, writing "Eureka is a heady, thought-provoking, and often beautiful experience—artistic minimalism at its most elasticated and textured." Peter Bradshaw, reviewing for The Guardian said that watching scenes of nature on screen was "an enriching experience". Bradshaw rated the film 4 stars out of 5 and wrote, "It is entirely fascinating, though undoubtedly it requires the audience to recalibrate their own consumption-tempo and attention span stamina."

== Accolades ==
Name of the award ceremony, year presented, category, nominee(s) of the award, and the result of the nomination
Award ceremony	Year	Category	Nominee / Work	Result	Ref.
Munich Film Festival	2023	ARRI Award for Best International Film	Eureka	Nominated	
Lima Film Festival	2023	Best Film	Eureka	Nominated	
Lima Film Festival	2023	Special Jury Prize	Eureka	Won	
Lima Film Festival	2023	First Honorable Mention for Best Film (International Critics)	Eureka	Won	

=== Listicle ===
Publisher	Year	Listicle	Placement	Ref.
Cineuropa	2023	15 films to look forward to at the 2023 Cannes Film Festival	1st	
