= Mohammad Farokhmanesh =

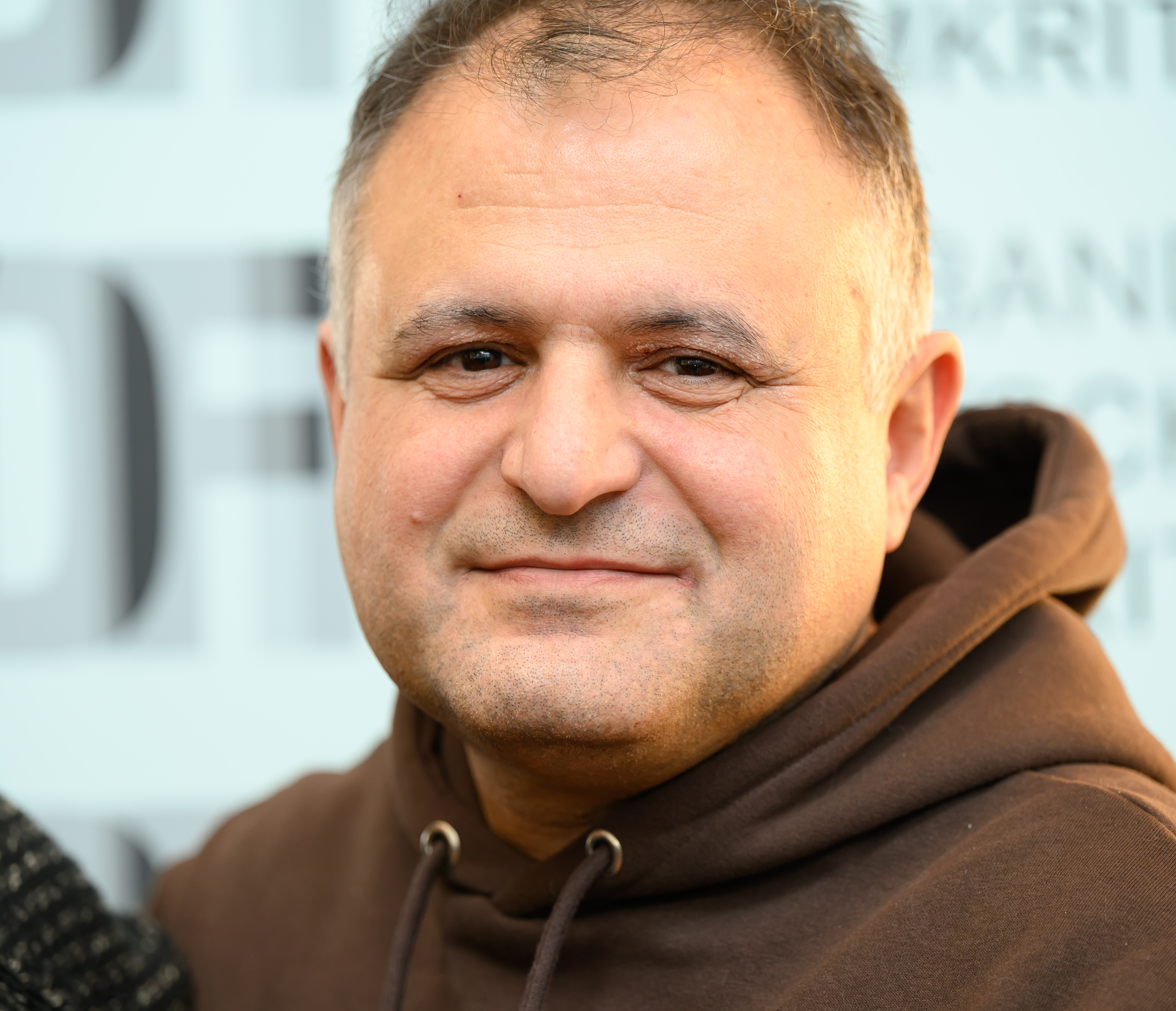
Farokhmanesh in 2026

Mohammad Farokhmanesh (Persian: محمد فرخ‌منش; born 1971 in Shiraz) is a Gerd Ruge-Prize winning Iranian film director, scriptwriter and producer, residing in Germany.

== Career ==
Mohammad Farokhmanesh, born 1971 in Shiraz, (Iran) started making his first short films during his education at the “Iranian Young Cinema Society”. In the years 1995-2001 he gained a University Degree in filmmaking at the Hochschule für bildende Künste (University of Fine Arts Hamburg), after the completion of which he worked two years as a film production consultant.

In 2000, he started his own company brave new work film productions GmbH with his partners Frank Geiger and Armin Hofmann. brave new work is located in Hamburg and has a local branch in Munich.

As a director and producer he realized more than 20 documentaries, feature- and short films. 2004 he received the “Gerd-Ruge-Award” for his debut feature EMPIRE OF EVIL. The documentary was nominated for the “First Appearance Award” (International Film Festival Amsterdam, IDFA), and for the “Golden Key” (Kasseler Dokumentarfilm- & Videofest). The film also won the award “Best Documentary” at the DaKINO International Film Festival (Bucharest). He was a member of the panel for the Human-Rights-Film-Award in 2008, and is an active member of the “Arbeitsgemeinschaft Dokumentarfilm” (AG DOK). brave new work is located in Hamburg and has a local branch in Munich.

Current projects are the feature documentary Little Aryans (2015) and Made in Islam (2015).

== Other activities ==
Due to his personal background and his co-operation with many Iranian artists within his work, he is regarded as a representative of the Iranians in Germany. In this position he often appeared in television, radio and print-media as a referee in topics of Iranian culture and politics.

== Filmography ==
- Grand Jeté (2022)
- City of Sounds (2014/15)

Documentary, Producer

- Made in Islam (2017)Documentary, Producer
- The Mamba (2014)

Comedy, Line producer, Producer

- 45 Minutes to Ramallah (2012)

Comedy, Producer

- Kick in Iran (2009)

Documentary, Producer

- EMPIRE OF EVIL (2007/08)

Documentary, Director/Producer

- COLORS OF MEMORY (2007),

Drama, Co-Writer/Producer

- GORDIAN TROELLER REVISITED (2007)

TV-Documentary, Line Producer

- 37 WITHOUT ONIONS (2006)

Short, Comedy, Producer

- STRIP MIND(2006)

Thriller, Producer

- OFFSIDE (2004),

Drama, Line Producer

- AGUJERO(2004)

Short film, Producer

- ROADKILL(2001)

Short film, Director/Producer

== Awards ==
2008: Best Documentary, Bucharest International Filmfestival 2008 ("Empire of Evil")

2007: Gerd Ruge Development Award ("Empire of Evil")

== Sources ==
- https://web.archive.org/web/20090324053542/http://www.bravenewwork.de/team.php?lang=de
- http://www.reichdesboesen.de/mohammad_farokhmanesh.php
- http://www.moviepilot.de/news/mohammad-farokhmanesh-ueber-sein-reich-des-boesen-101679
- http://www.dradio.de/dkultur/sendungen/thema/983390/
- http://agdok.de/-/mitglied/39098
- http://www.news.de/politik/838734695/unterdrueckung-staerkt-den-einfluss-des-westens/1/

== See also ==
- Iranian cinema
