= Richard Wells =

Richard Wells may refer to:

- Sir Richard Wells (Royal Navy officer) (1833–1896), British admiral
- Sir Richard Wells, 1st Baronet (1879–1957), Conservative Member of Parliament for Bedford
- Richard Wells (nurse) (1950–1993), British nurse, nursing adviser and health care administrator
- Richard M. Wells (born 1929), Major General of United States Army, director of Defense Mapping Agency
- Richard Wells (composer), British film, TV and games composer
- C. Richard Wells, American evangelical pastor, theologian, and college president
- Richard Wells (cricketer) (born 1956), Rhodesian-born English cricketer
- Richard W. Wells, Australian herpetologist
- Richard Wells (politician), American politician
- Richard Wells (dancer), American tap dancer and nightclub owner
