= Isabelle Stever =

German filmmaker (born 1963)

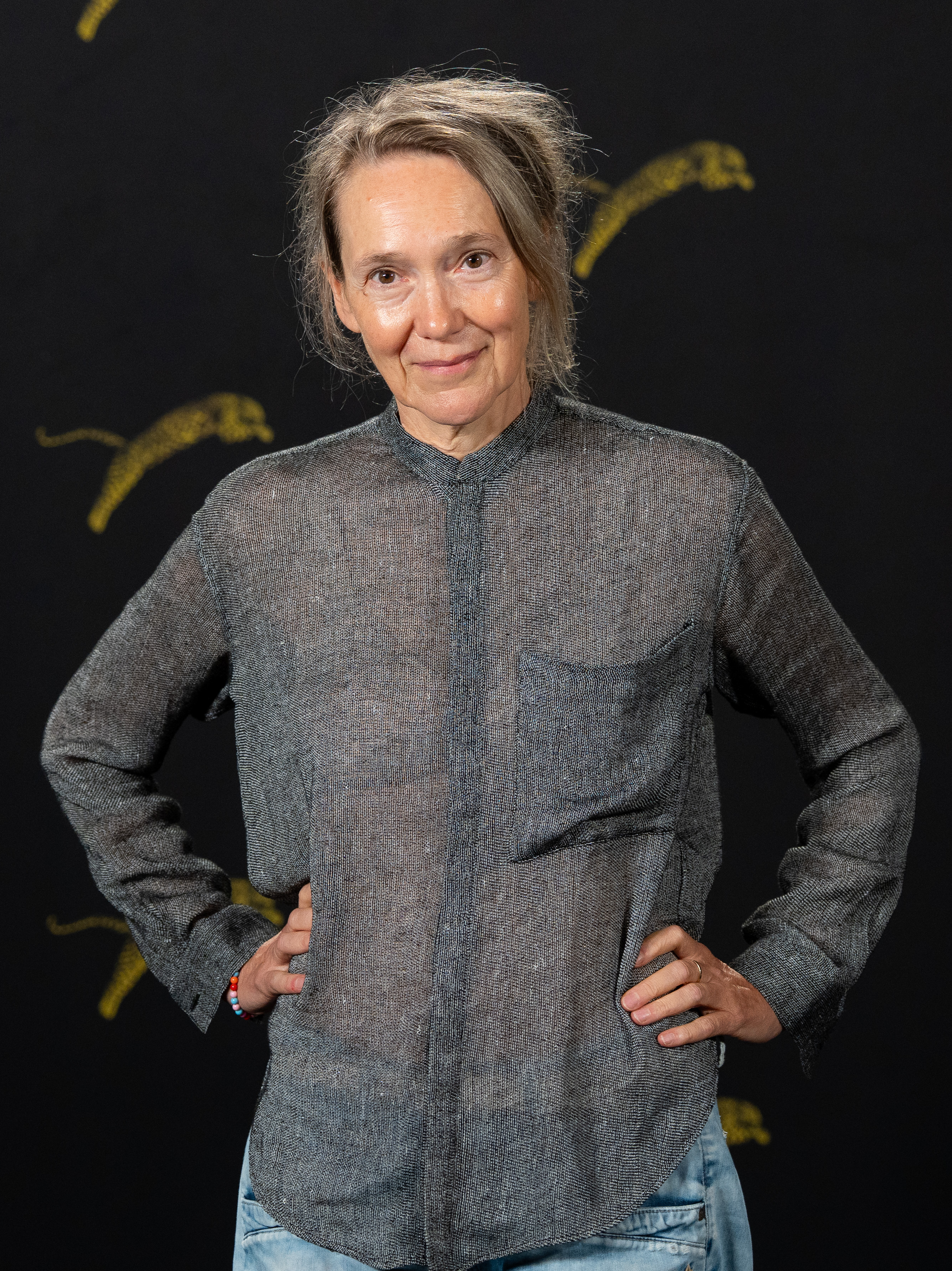
- Stever at the 2026 Locarno Film Festival
- Born: 1963 (age 62–63); Munich, West Germany
- Education: Technische Universität Berlin; Deutsche Film- und Fernsehakademie Berlin
- Occupations: Director; screenwriter
- Years active: 2002–present
- Spouses: Oskar Roehler (divorced): Anna Melikova
- Children: 1

Isabelle Stever (born 1963) is a German film director and screenwriter. She is best known for directing the films Grand Jeté (2022) and I Rarely Wake Up Dreaming (2026).

== Early life ==
Stever was born in Munich in 1963 to a lawyer father and a homemaker mother. She was raised Catholic. She graduated with a degree in mathematics in 1994 and subsequently studied film directing at the Deutsche Film- und Fernsehakademie Berlin (DFFB), receiving her directing diploma in 2002.

== Career ==
Stever's graduation film, Portrait of a Married Couple (2002), won the First Steps Award for Best Feature Film. Her second feature film, Gisela (2005), was based on the book of the same name by Anke Stelling, whom Stever had known since the early 2000s, and Robby Dannenberg. Stever and Stelling jointly wrote the screenplay.

Stever later contributed the short film A Democratic Round Table at Scheduled Times to the anthology film Germany 09: 13 Short Films About the State of the Nation (2009), which premiered in competition at the 59th Berlin International Film Festival. The following year, she once again collaborated with Stelling on her film Blessed Events (2010), which premiered at the 35th Toronto International Film Festival. She subsequently directed The Weather Inside (2015), with German filmmaker Harun Farocki collaborating on the screenplay before his death.

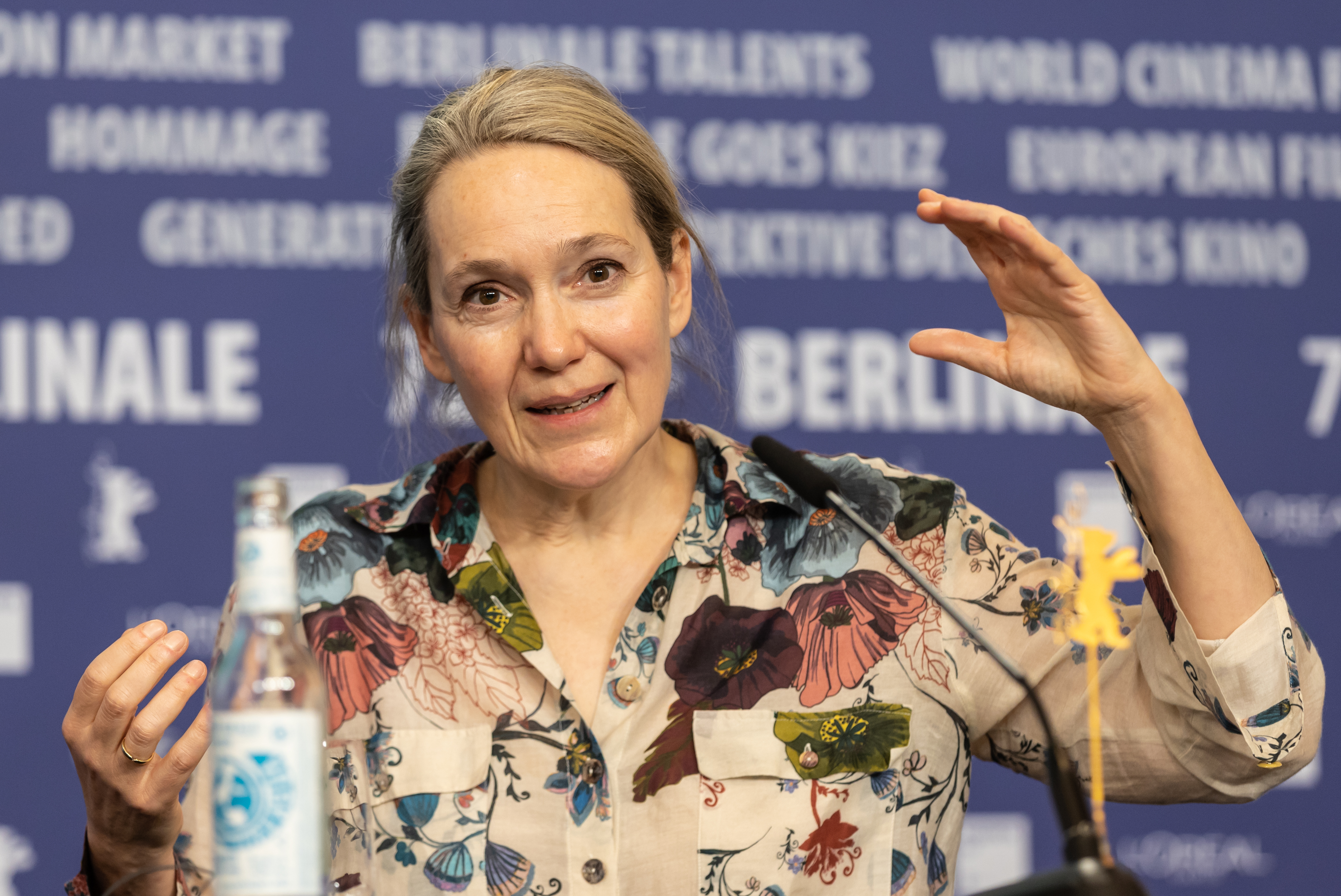
Stever at the 2022 Berlin International Film Festival

From October to December 2021, Stever was a film fellow and artist-in-residence at Villa Aurora in Los Angeles. She subsequently collaborated with Stelling for the third time on her film Grand Jeté (2022), based on Stelling's novel Fürsorge. The screenplay was written by Stever's wife, Anna Melikova. The film premiered in the Panorama section of the 72nd Berlin International Film Festival. The following year, she served on the jury of the Berlinale Shorts section of the 73rd Berlin International Film Festival.

Stever and Melikova collaborated again on I Rarely Wake Up Dreaming (2026), for which Melikova wrote the screenplay. The film had its world premiere in the Concorso Internazionale section of the 79th Locarno Film Festival.

=== Teaching career ===
Stever has been a freelance lecturer at her alma mater, the DFFB, since 2006. She has also taught at the Film Academy Baden-Württemberg.

== Personal life ==
Stever is married to Ukrainian writer Anna Melikova, who wrote the screenplays for her films Grand Jeté (2022) and I Rarely Wake Up Dreaming (2026). Stever had previously been married to German film director Oskar Roehler.

== Filmography ==
| Year | Title | Director | Screenplay | Notes | Ref. |
|---|---|---|---|---|---|
| 2002 | Portrait of a Married Couple | Yes | Yes | | |
| 2005 | Gisela | Yes | Yes | | |
| 2009 | A Democratic Round Table at Scheduled Times | Yes | Yes | Short film | |
| 2010 | Blessed Events | Yes | Yes | | |
| 2015 | The Weather Inside | Yes | Yes | | |
| 2022 | Grand Jeté | Yes | No | | |
| 2026 | I Rarely Wake Up Dreaming | Yes | No | | |

== Awards and distinctions ==
- 2002: First Steps Award, Best Feature Film – Portrait of a Married Couple
- 2006: Crossing Europe Award, European Competition – Gisela
- 2006: Best Baltic Debut Award – Gisela
- 2016: Best Story, 2morrow Film Festival – The Weather Inside
- 2026: 79th Locarno Film Festival: nominated in main competition and Junior Jury Award – I Rarely Wake Up Dreaming
