= Jani Be Good =

2026 drama film by Ariani Darmawan

- Indonesian: Desember Jani
- Directed by: Ariani Darmawan
- Written by: Ariani Darmawan; Cyntha Hariadi
- Produced by: Meiske Taurisia; Muhammad Zaidy
- Starring: Tutie Kirana; Chempa Puteri; Sigi Wimala; Hyori Mika
- Cinematography: Teoh Gay Hian
- Edited by: Ahmad Yuniardi
- Music by: Dave Lumenta
- Production company: Palari Films
- Release dates: 27 October 2026 (Tokyo); 10 December 2026 (Indonesia)
- Running time: 101 minutes
- Country: Indonesia
- Language: Indonesian

Jani Be Good (Indonesian: Desember Jani) is a 2026 Indonesian coming-of-age drama film directed by Ariani Darmawan in her directorial debut from a screenplay she co-wrote with Cyntha Hariadi. It stars Chempa Puteri, Sigi Wimala, Tutie Kirana, and Hyori Mika.

The film had its world premiere at the 39th Tokyo International Film Festival on 27 October 2026. It is set to be released in Indonesian theatres on 10 December 2026.

== Premise ==
The dynamics within a house shared by a grandmother, a mother, and her two daughters begin to shift after the eldest daughter runs away from home.

== Cast ==
- Chempa Puteri as Jani
- Sigi Wimala as Winnie
- Tutie Kirana as Oma
- Hyori Mika as Julia

== Production ==
Jani Be Good marks director Ariani Darmawan's debut feature film, as well as her return to filmmaking following her short film Jus Nanas Kue Lapis, part of the 2022 anthology Piknik Pesona. The idea for the film originated from a conversation between Darmawan and producer Meiske Taurisia. During the conversation, Taurisia asked Darmawan about the most extraordinary experience she had had while not making films. Darmawan answered that it was "being a mother", which became the starting point for the film. Darmawan then recruited novelist Cyntha Hariadi to co-write the film's screenplay after reading Hariadi's anthology Manifesto Flora. The project then participated at the Hong Kong-Asia Film Financing Forum in March 2026. In September 2026, it was reported that actress Luna Maya would serve as the film's executive producer.

== Release ==
Jani Be Good had its world premiere at the 39th Tokyo International Film Festival, competing at the Asian Future section, on 27 October 2026. The film received the Asian Future Special Mention Award at the festival. It is set to release in Indonesian theatres on 10 December 2026.
