= Silenced Nights =

2026 Filipino drama film

- Teaser poster
- Directed by: Lawrence Fajardo
- Screenplay by: Troy Espiritu
- Produced by: Ferdy Lapuz; Patricia Sumagui
- Starring: Nico Antonio; Lotlot de Leon
- Cinematography: Albert Banzon
- Edited by: Lawrence Fajardo; Benjo Ferrer
- Music by: Joseph Lansang
- Production companies: Quantum Films; House on Fire; House on Fire International
- Release dates: 13 September 2026 (TIFF); 16 September 2026 (Philippines)
- Running time: 112 minutes
- Countries: Philippines; France; Taiwan
- Language: Filipino

Silenced Nights is a 2026 drama film directed by Lawrence Fajardo. The film set in a Philippine slum stars Nico Antonio and Lotlot de Leon, and is inspired by 2017 killing of Kian delos Santos. An international co-production between Philippines, France, and Taiwan it follows a witness to an extrajudicial killing as he seeks to make the truth known.

The film had its world premiere in the Platform section of the 2026 Toronto International Film Festival on 13 September 2026, where it competed for the Platform Prize. It is also slated to open in Philippine theaters on 16 September 2026 following its world premiere.

== Cast ==
- Nico Antonio
- Lotlot de Leon
- Ina Feleo
- Tanya Gomez
- Joel Saracho
- Dylan Ray Talon
- Simon Ibarra
- Mario Magallona
- Rom Factolerin
- Soliman Cruz
- Hector Macaso
- Raul Morit
- Bombi Plata
- Apollo Abraham
- DMs Boongaling
- Mae Paner
- Tess Jamias Nuyad
- Micko Laurente
- Enzo Osorio
- Jorrybell Agoto
- Aquisha Tombig

== Production ==
The film was shot in 2025 in Happy Land, a sitio in Tondo, Manila right after Christmas amid the holiday decorations as the title of the film hints an allusion to the popular intangible cultural heritage Christmas carol, "Silent Night." In June 2026, it was reported that film has completed the post production.

== Release ==
Silenced Nights had its world premiere at the 2026 Toronto International Film Festival on 13 September 2026, in the Platform section.

== Accolades ==
Award	Date of ceremony	Category	Recipient(s)	Result	Ref.
Toronto International Film Festival	20 September 2026	Platform Prize	Silenced Nights	Nominated	
