= Liverpool (2008 film) =

- Directed by: Lisandro Alonso
- Written by: Lisandro Alonso; Salvador Roselli
- Screenplay by: Lisandro Alonso; Salvador Roselli
- Produced by: Lisandro Alonso; Ilse Hughan; Lluís Miñarro; Marianne Slot
- Starring: Juan Fernández; Nieves Cabrera; Giselle Irrazabal
- Cinematography: Lucio Bonelli
- Edited by: Lisandro Alonso; Sergi Dies; Fernando Epstein; Martín Mainoli; Ana Remón
- Music by: Flor Maleva
- Production companies: 4L; Black Forest Films; CMW Films; Eddie Saeta S.A.; Slot Machine
- Release date: 30 October 2008 (Argentina)
- Running time: 84 minutes
- Countries: Argentina; France; Netherlands; Germany; Spain
- Language: Spanish
- Box office: $24,029

Liverpool is a 2008 Argentine drama film directed by Lisandro Alonso, co-written with Salvador Roselli, and starring Juan Fernández.

The film had its world premiere at the Directors' Fortnight section of the 2008 Cannes Film Festival, and was theatrically released in Argentina on 30 October 2008.

== Plot ==
The film follows Farrel, a merchant seaman who applies for leave in Ushuaia, Tierra del Fuego to visit his mother in his home village after twenty years away. Farrel is played by Juan Fernández, a native of Ushuaia who drives a snow plow for a living.

First are vignettes of life aboard ship, an oceangoing cargo vessel. Video games in a rec room. A larder with sausages and snacks. An instrument room, then an engine room. We’re following one character in particular (Farrel). He’s rousted from sleeping where he shouldn’t be. Visits his quarters – spare and rather dismal. Does some maintenance painting in a workshop. Climbs upstairs to the deck, knocking at a door on his way out (we’re not sure why). Stands at the railing in a strong wind, looking out at the rushing water.

Then later on the bridge, he’s dressed differently and attending to a small control wheel. Behind him is a navigator at his maps. The captain arrives and has a word. The ship is seven hours from docking at Ushuaia in bad weather. Farrel explains to the captain that he’ll need to go ashore. He grew up in the area and would like to check on his mother, who “used to live near a sawmill.” He hasn’t seen her in years, and the captain approves – though Farrel will have to return in time.

He's showered and packing his gear, including a bottle of vodka (after a swig). Bides his time with a few idle chores around the darkened deck. Then signs out and descends the metal staircase in a whipping wind. He’s underdressed, no hat, no gloves, and the ground is coated in wet ice. Farther on he ducks into an alley and swaps out his large bag for a smaller one, stashing the extra belongings to be picked up later. Then he sits for a meal by himself in a restaurant, and later drinks alone at a nude dance bar.

In the morning he wakes by the water, in what appears to be a derelict ferry with a ruined interior. The day begins with a cigarette, looking out the windows, and a swallow of vodka. Then a hike across a shipping yard to a truck depot where he asks for a ride to Tolhuin. He’s told where to wait, and we see him entering a traveler’s dorm with a kitchen, warming his hands before a radiator. Two card players at a table welcome him to coffee, and a woman with her bags packed sits idly watching television, a program that sounds like a soap opera.

At a cue from outside she rises to leave and he follows after. They meet the driver of a flatbed truck hauling a half dozen logs. Farrel and a third passenger climb in back while the woman is seated in the cabin. Along the road is barren forest with a snowy range of mountains as backdrop. The third man knocks on the roof at his stop and is let off. Farrel takes a swig from the vodka bottle and rubs his cold hands. At the sawmill road the sun is lowering, illuminating the treetops with a band of golden light, as Farrel hops down.

Trudging across a playing field he stops at the weathered posts of a soccer goal. Then squatting to the ground he clears a patch of ice with a penknife and studies something carved or written underneath. Farther on he stops for a long drink of vodka by a rusty storage tank. A dog is barking. In a residential settlement an older man (Trujillo) seems to recognize him. Farrel stops at a rugged canteen for a something to eat, seated on a bench at a long table. There’s bread, stew, and red wine. A shortwave radio is heard, and talk about fuel, road conditions, and a flock of sheep. Also a sick woman named Nazarena who is not getting any better. Trujillo brings kindling and recognizes Farrel again.

A shy young woman (Analia) enters the canteen with a serving dish. She doesn’t speak, standing awkwardly near Farrel and stealing glances. The serving dish is filled from the kitchen and she is escorted home by Trujillo, seeming vulnerable. Farrel follows to the house, looking through a window and drinking his vodka, careful not to be seen. In the morning he’s found passed out in an abandoned shed, the bottle empty, and carried into Trujillo’s cottage to warm up. “Shortly after you left, Analia was born,” he is told. “You left me quite a legacy. What are you hoping to find? Your mother is sick.”

We see Analia with some rabbits in the snow. She’s rather clumsy and childish for her age. Farrel returns to the canteen where he a buys a fresh loaf of bread. Then enters the house from the night before, letting himself in the front door. There is Analia now, drawing at a table by the window. “A heart,” she says. Farrel gives her the bread but she doesn’t notice, asking instead, “Will you give me money?” Her manner and her voice are simpleminded. Farrel finds his mother (Nazarena) bedridden and sits a while beside her, telling her his name. But she does not recognize him. “Your hands are freezing,” she says.

Preparing to leave, Farrel presses some bills into Analia’s hand. She puts her coat on and walks outside ahead of him. He catches up to her, having first taken a photograph from a shelf. Out on the snow he gives her a souvenir, a keepsake on a chain, then sets off back across the field toward the road. He walks at a good clip, without ever looking back. At the window of his cottage, Trujillo is peeling apples as the rabbits hop around their hutch. In the sawmill Analia comes wandering through and is escorted safely to the other side.

At night, Trujillo is spoon-feeding broth to Nazarena. And later Analia settles into the bed next to her grandmother, turning out the light. In the morning she is helping Trujillo check a number of fur traps. She pauses once, hiding her face beside a tree and crying. Most of the traps are empty, but they’ve caught a fox. They retreat to a barn where Trujillo prepares the carcass for stretching and Analia goes to feed some sheep. She tosses handfuls of grassy fodder about carelessly to the skittish flock. Then steps away sulking to lean against the side of the barn.

Earlier we’d seen her with a pencil, writing a private message on a wooden fencepost. Now she stands with her hands in her pockets, checking furtively to make sure she’s alone. From her pocket she pulls the keepsake letting it dangle. We see it closer now, a gaudy metal keychain from the port of Liverpool, the name of the city in a modish stylized script. It is a perfectly awful gift. Thoughtless and cheap. We watch it spin a moment in her hand, and then the screen goes black.

== Cast ==
- Juan Fernández as Farrel
- Nieves Cabrera as Trujillo
- Giselle Irrazabal as Analía

== Release ==
It screened at many international film festivals, including 2008 Cannes Film Festival, Toronto International Film Festival and Maryland Film Festival. The film was released on DVD by Kino International on 30 November 2010. The cinematography was by Lucio Bonelli.

== Reception ==
The LA Times called it a "bold, successful attempt at a film narrative in which images are everything and words are few." The New York Times concluded that "Although it has its visual pleasures, and there’s plenty to admire about his compositions, the journey in “Liverpool” seems comparatively slight". Variety felt that the "[b]rilliance of the overall conception and execution will immediately hit some viewers, while others may need to mull things over".
