= Richard Wells (cricketer) =

English cricketer

Personal information
- Full name: Richard Raymond Collingwood Wells
- Born: 19 January 1956 (age 70); Salisbury, Southern Rhodesia
- Batting: Right-handed

Domestic team information
- Years: Team
- 1977–1978: Oxford University

Career statistics
Competition	First-class
Matches	11
Runs scored	212
Batting average	13.25
100s/50s	–/1
Top score	85
Catches/stumpings	4/–
- Source: Cricinfo, 7 June 2020

Richard Raymond Collingwood Wells (born 19 January 1956) is a Rhodesian-born English former first-class cricketer.

Wells was born in Southern Rhodesia at Salisbury in January 1956. He was educated in England at Cranleigh School, before going up to Christ Church, Oxford. While studying at Oxford, he played first-class cricket for Oxford University in 1977 and 1978, making eleven appearances. He scored 212 runs in his eleven matches, at an average of 13.25 and a high score of 85, which came against Leicestershire in 1977.
