= Lisandro Alonso =

Argentine film director (born 1975)

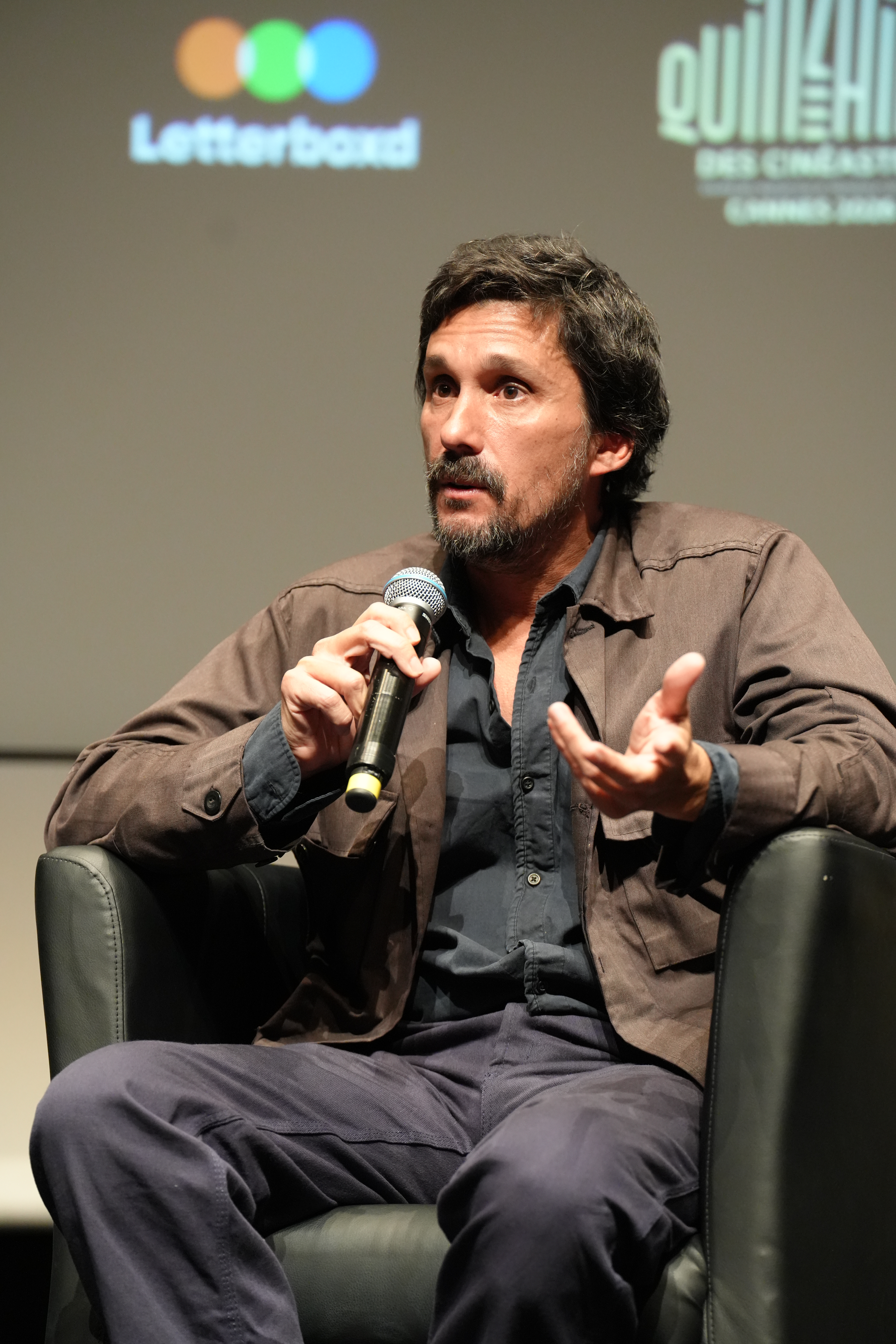
- Alonso in 2026
- Born: 2 June 1975 (age 51); Buenos Aires, Argentina
- Education: Universidad del Cine
- Occupations: Director, screenwriter, producer, editor
- Years active: 2001–present

Lisandro Alonso (born 2 June 1975) is an Argentine filmmaker. A leading figure in the slow cinema and the New Argentine Cinema movement, he is most known for his minimalist, observational films featuring long takes, sparse or absent dialogue, blending elements of documentary and fiction.

All his feature films have premiered at the Cannes Film Festival. His drama film Jauja (2014) won the FIPRESCI Prize at the 67th Cannes Film Festival.

== Early life ==
Alonso was born on 2 June 1975 in Buenos Aires. He studied filmmaking for three years at the Universidad del Cine in Buenos Aires, where he trained in sound design and directing. While a student, he co-directed the four-minute short film Dos en la vereda (1995) with Catriel Vildosola, a naturalistic sketch of two boys drinking and talking on a sidewalk that presaged his later interest in non-professional actors and observational filmmaking.

After graduating, Alonso worked as an assistant director and sound designer on various productions until 2000 to finance his own filmmaking.

== Career ==
=== 2000s ===
Alonso's debut feature, Freedom (2001), was a low-budget production financed primarily with family funds. Shot over nine days in the rural Pampas with a minimal crew, the film follows the daily routine of a solitary lumberjack, played by non-professional actor Misael Saavedra, a real woodcutter Alonso had encountered. It was selected for the Un Certain Regard section of the 2001 Cannes Film Festival and was praised by critics as a pioneering example of slow cinema for its unadorned depiction of rural work life in Argentina.

After founding his own production company, 4L, Alonso directed Los muertos (2004), which premiered in the Directors' Fortnight section of the 2004 Cannes Film Festival. Variety called Alonso "the poet and master" of the slow-moving minimalism of new Argentine cinema.

He completed the informal trilogy, "Lonely Men Trilogy", with Fantasma (2006), a labyrinthine feature set inside a movie theater in Buenos Aires, which premiered in the Directors' Fortnight at 2006 Cannes Film Festival.

Alonso shifted toward a more fictional approach in Liverpool (2008), following a young sailor who returns to the remote villages of Tierra del Fuego in search of his mother. The film also premiered at the Directors' Fortnight section of the 2008 Cannes Film Festival and won the Best Feature Film award at the Gijón International Film Festival, whose jury praised it as "a commitment to a radical cinema that takes risks and is seldom catered to by commercial circuits".

In 2009, Alonso and Spanish filmmaker Albert Serra participated in a filmic exchange project in which each revisited a previous work using the same crew and actors. The project, titled Sinergias: Diálogo entre Albert Serra y Lisandro Alonso (2011), produced two short films: Serra's Lord Worked Wonders in Me and Alonso's Untitled (Letter to Serra), in which Alonso re-examined La libertad and employed its lead, Misael Saavedra.

=== 2010s ===
Alonso returned with a significant departure of his slow cinema origins with Jauja (2014), his first film to employ a professional foreign actor (Viggo Mortensen) and his first period setting production, set in nineteenth-century Patagonia. The film premiered at the Un Certain Regard section of the 2014 Cannes Film Festival, where it won the FIPRESCI Prize. Following the film's success, the Film Society of Lincoln Center named Alonso its 2014 Filmmaker in Residence.

After Jauja, Alonso received a fellowship at the Radcliffe Institute for Advanced Study at Harvard University for the 2016–17 academic year, during which he began developing what would become his most ambitious project. Through Mortensen's connections, Alonso also made repeated visits to the Pine Ridge Indian Reservation in South Dakota over several years, researching the experiences of the Lakota community.

=== 2020s ===
Almost ten years later, Alonso returned with Eureka (2023), a triptych spanning indigenous history between 1870 and 2019 in the Americas. Moving from a black-and-white western set in the Old West to a present-day drama on Pine Ridge to a sequence in the Amazon rainforest during 1970s Brazil. Starring Viggo Mortensen, Chiara Mastroianni, non-professional actors from the Pine Ridge community, and Brazilian indigenous actors, the film was co-written with Martín Caparrós and Fabián Casas. It premiered at the Cannes Premiere section of the 2023 Cannes Film Festival, it won the Fiction Jury Prize at the 27th Lima Film Festival.

He starred in Luca Guadagnino's Queer (2024) as Mr. Cotter, the partner of Dr. Cotter (Lesley Manville). The couple plays a key role in the film. Guadagnino cast three of his close filmmakers friends in the film, including Alonso, Ariel Schulman and David Lowery.

=== Future projects ===
During early 2026, he filmed his next feature film The Scent of the Pitanga, a remake of Abbas Kiarostami's Iranian film Taste of Cherry (1997). Set in Palmas, capital of Tocantins, a state bisected by the Amazon rainforest. Starring Wagner Moura, it will be Alonso's first production fully in Portuguese.

== Style ==
Alonso's filmmaking is characterised by long takes, sparse or absent dialogue, ambient sound, and the use of non-professional actors drawn from the actual locations of his films. His work is frequently associated with the international slow cinema movement alongside directors such as Béla Tarr, Tsai Ming-liang, Carlos Reygadas, and Pedro Costa. His early films typically followed solitary individuals in remote environments, using extended observation to explore themes of isolation, labour, and the passage of time.

In interviews, he has resisted the "slow cinema" label, stating that he does not set out to make films within any particular movement, though he acknowledges the affinities critics have drawn. He typically writes, directs, and edits his own films, often also serving as producer through his company 4L.

Alonso has preferred to shoot on film stock rather than digitally, favouring 35 mm because, as he has explained, the physical weight of the camera encourages deliberate planning of each shot.

== Filmography ==
Year	English title	Original title	Notes
2001	Freedom	La libertad	
2004	Los muertos		
2006	Fantasma		
2008	Liverpool		
2014	Jauja		
2023	Eureka		
2026	Double Freedom	La Libertad Doble	
TBA	The Scent of the Pitanga	O Aroma da Pitanga	Post-production

=== Short films ===
Year	English title	Original title	Notes
1995	Dos en la vereda		Co-directed with Catriel Vildosola
2009	Lechuza		
2011	Untitled (Letter to Serra)	Sin título (Carta para Serra)	

=== Acting credits ===
- The Dead Don't Hurt (2023) as Beto Acosta (cameo)
- Queer (2024) as Mr. Cotter
