= Arrested Memory =

2026 action film by Sabu

- Chinese: 狂忘警探
- Directed by: Sabu
- Written by: Sabu
- Produced by: Justine O; Roger Huang; Shozo Ichiyama
- Starring: Ethan Juan; Hsieh Ying-xuan; Moon Lee
- Cinematography: Jai Ip
- Edited by: Matthieu Laclau
- Music by: Junichi Matsumoto
- Production companies: LHB Films; Fourier Films
- Release date: 7 September 2026 (Venice)
- Running time: 87 minutes
- Countries: Taiwan; Japan
- Languages: Japanese; Mandarin; Taiwanese

Arrested Memory (Chinese: 狂忘警探) is a 2026 action comedy film written and directed by Sabu. A co-production of Taiwan and Japan, it stars Ethan Juan, Hsieh Ying-xuan and Moon Lee.

The film had its world premiere out of competition of the 83rd Venice International Film Festival on 3 September 2026, where it received positive reviews.

== Cast ==
- Ethan Juan as Detective Lee
- Hsieh Ying-xuan as Tami
- Moon Lee as Hua
- Shinichi Tsutsumi as Hatta
- Reika Kirishima as Hatta's wife
- Akira Huang as Mad Dog Luke

== Production ==
Sabu originally wrote the screenplay in 2007, and the film was considered for production in Germany, France, South Korea, and Japan before ultimately being produced in Taiwan. He storyboarded nearly 2,000 shots before filming began. The film was shot in Taiwan in late 2025. It was produced by Taiwanese LHB Films and Japanese Fourier Films.

== Release ==
The film had its world premiere out competition at the 83rd Venice International Film Festival. It was later screened at the 51st Toronto Film Festival, finishing second runner-up in the People's Choice Award: Midnight Madness category.It was also screened in the Gala section of 39th Tokyo International Film Festival on 27 October 2026.

== Reception ==
On the review aggregator website Rotten Tomatoes, 82% of 11 critics' reviews are positive.

IndieWire's Jake Cole compared the film's style to Johnnie To's, and noted how "the Japanese genre auteur's approach to memory loss is more interested in slapstick than existential rumination, but that doesn't dampen his affection for his characters". Martin Kudlac from ScreenAnarchy called the film an "eccentric genre hybrid [that] remains a welcome variation on familiar material".
