= The Age of Goodbyes =

2026 Malaysian-Taiwanese drama film

The Age of Goodbyes is a 2026 Malaysian-Taiwanese drama film. It was adapted from the 2012 Li Zi Shu novel of the same name. It was written and directed by Edmund Yeo.
