= Freedom (2001 film) =

2001 film

- Directed by: Lisandro Alonso
- Written by: Lisandro Alonso
- Produced by: Hugo Alberto Alonso; Lisandro Alonso
- Starring: Misael Saavedra
- Cinematography: Cobi Migliora
- Edited by: Lisandro Alonso
- Release date: 28 June 2001
- Running time: 73 minutes
- Country: Argentina
- Language: Spanish

Freedom (Spanish: La libertad) is a 2001 Argentine drama film directed by Lisandro Alonso. It was screened in the Un Certain Regard section at the 2001 Cannes Film Festival.

== Summary ==
Misael resides in the Pampas Mountains, where he works with his axe, sustains himself with the bare necessities, and maintains minimal interaction with others. The movie closely follows his day-to-day existence, aiming to reveal his unique approach to navigating the world through subtle gestures and actions.

== Cast ==
- Misael Saavedra as Lumberjack
- Humberto Estrada as Foreman
- Rafael Estrada as Foreman's son
- Omar Didino as Wood buyer
- Javier Didino as Gas-station employee
