= Big Little Things =

2026 drama film by Michelle Zhou

- International promotional poster
- Traditional Chinese: 謊言生活
- Simplified Chinese: 谎言生活
- Directed by: Michelle Zhou
- Written by: Michelle Zhou
- Produced by: Three Dots Films; Snow Island Pictures; Junjie Zhai; Clarissa Zhang
- Cinematography: Hark Xu
- Edited by: Xinzhu Liu
- Music by: Gang Yu
- Release date: 11 September 2026 (Venice)
- Running time: 109 minutes
- Countries: Hong Kong; United States
- Languages: Mandarin; Cantonese

Big Little Things (Chinese: 謊言生活; lit. 'A Life of Lies') is a 2026 drama film written and directed by Michelle Zhou, and expanded from Zhou's previous short film of the same name. A co-production of Hong Kong and the United States, it was inspired by Zhou and co-producer Chun Yu's coming out to their parents, and the subsequent family conflict, during the COVID-19 pandemic.

The film had its world premiere in the Orizzonti section of the 83rd Venice International Film Festival on 11 September 2026.

== Cast ==
- Cuishan Liang
- Jialing Sun
- Bin Yu
- Ling Hu
- Hai Yu

== Production ==
The story originated from the personal experiences of producers Zhou and Yu. They began dating in 2022, during the COVID-19 pandemic; Zhou visited Yu's family during the New Year in Harbin, China, and though Yu told her parents that Zhou was simply a friend, her father realized that they were romantic partners, causing "deep family chaos". The family eventually reconciled with the two.

Zhou first shot the story as a short film in 2023. In expanding it to a feature-length film, Zhou added a fictional subplot where the protagonist hires a person to play a fake boyfriend in an attempt to appease her family, referencing lavender marriages common in the country's LGBTQ+ community. Yu's real-life father, Hai, was cast to play the father in the film, having previously appeared as her father in the original short. She said filming the confession scene between the father and daughter characters proved cathartic for both of them.

Hark Xu, the film's cinematographer, shot the film on an Arri Alexa Mini using Zeiss Super Speed prime lenses. Most of the scenes were shot handheld and on location in Harbin, where temperatures reached as low as –30 degrees Celsius.

Big Little Things was a selection of the 2025 Golden Horse Film Festival's Film Project Promotion, where it received the Activator Market Potential Award.

== Release ==
Big Little Things premiered on 11 September 2026, in the Orizzonti section of the 83rd Venice International Film Festival. The film had initially been selected for the festival's Giornate degli Autori section before being invited to move to Orizzonti instead.

In July 2026, Hong Kong company Moebius Entertainment boarded the film, handling its worldwide sales rights and festival representation.
