= Hearing (film) =

2026 film by Lê Bảo

- Vietnamese: Thính Giác
- Directed by: Lê Bảo
- Written by: Lê Bảo
- Produced by: Huỳnh Yến; Elizabeth Wijaya; Weijie Lai
- Starring: Nguyễn Quốc Tuấn
- Cinematography: Nguyễn Vinh Phúc
- Edited by: Carlo Francisco Manatad; Dounia Sichov
- Music by: Mental Overdrive
- Production companies: E&W Films
- Release date: 10 August 2026 (Locarno)
- Running time: 128 minutes
- Countries: Singapore; Vietnam; Norway; France; Indonesia; Saudi Arabia; Cambodia; Thailand; Taiwan
- Language: Vietnamese

Hearing (Vietnamese: Thính Giác) is a 2026 drama film directed and written by Lê Bảo. The film stars Nguyễn Quốc Tuấn as Ninh, a mechanic who installs decibel meters. It is an international co-production of Singapore, Vietnam, Norway, France, Indonesia, Saudi Arabia, Cambodia, Thailand, and Taiwan.

The film had its world premiere at the 79th Locarno Film Festival on 10 August 2026, competing for the Golden Leopard.

== Premise ==
A mechanic wishes for his estranged parents to reconcile while grappling with his fear of losing his connection with his ex-wife and their children.

== Cast ==
- Nguyễn Quốc Tuấn as Ninh
- Ngọc Tản as Ninh's mother
- Vân Hà
- Chí Linh
- Khánh Huyền

== Production ==
In November 2025, it was reported that the project received production grant from the Purin Film Fund. It participated at the CineMart, held during the International Film Festival Rotterdam, in February 2026. In June 2026, it received 500,000 Norwegian krone grant from Sørfond. In September 2026, it was announced that it received Post-Production Grant from the Red Sea Fund.

== Release ==
Hearing had its world premiere at the 79th Locarno Film Festival on 10 August 2026, competing for the Golden Leopard. In July 2026, it was announced that Heretic acquired the film's international sales rights.
