= 53rd Telluride Film Festival =

2026 film festival

- Location: Telluride, Colorado, United States
- Founded: 1974
- Awards: Telluride Film Festival Silver Medallion: Andrew Haigh; Sandra Hüller; John Malkovich
- Artistic director: Julie Huntsinger
- Festival date: September 4–7, 2026
- Website: www.telluridefilmfestival.org

Telluride Film Festival
- 54th 52nd

The 53rd Telluride Film Festival took place from September 4 to 7, 2026, in Telluride, Colorado.

British actress and filmmaker Rebecca Hall was chosen as the edition's guest director, and selected six classic films for a parallel section.

The Telluride Film Festival Silver Medallion was presented to British filmmaker Andrew Haigh, German actress Sandra Hüller, and American actor John Malkovich.

Roughly one month before the opening, a flash flood hit the city, damaging significantly a number of buildings, including the Michael D. Palm Theatre.

World premieres included: Andrew Haigh's A Long Winter, Bryan Fogel's The Row, David Zellner and Nathan Zellner's Alpha Gang, Eleanor Coppola's Making Marie Antoinette, Frank Marshall and Nigel Sinclair's Pete Townshend: Behind Blue Eyes, Guy Nattiv's The Liberation, Jennifer Peedom's Tenzing, Jesse Eisenberg's The Debut, Małgorzata Szumowska and Michał Englert's The Idiot(s), Mike Leigh's Tender Loving Care, Nanette Burstein's Carl Sagan: We Are Made of Star Stuff, and Simon Stone's Elsinore.

On September 4, the festival's organization announced a surprise "secret screening" of a highly anticipated new film for September 6. The film screened was Nathan Fielder and Lance Oppenheim's You Can See Everything.

== Official selection ==
The official line-up was announced, as usual, on the day before the festival's official opening.

=== Main Program ===
The following films were selected to be screened:

English Title	Original Title	Director(s)	Production Country
Act 3		Christine Molloy and Joe Lawlor	Ireland, United Kingdom
Alpha Gang		David Zellner and Nathan Zellner	United States, Australia
Avedon		Ron Howard	United States
La bola negra		Javier Ambrossi and Javier Calvo	Spain, France
Bucking Fastard		Werner Herzog	Ireland, United States
Burgundy		Michael Dweck and Gregory Kershaw	France
Carl Sagan: We Are Made of Star Stuff		Nanette Burstein	United States
Club Kid		Jordan Firstman	United States
The Debut		Jesse Eisenberg	United States
The Disciple		Joanna Natasegara	United Kingdom, United States
Elsinore		Simon Stone	United Kingdom
Everest: The Other Side		Elizabeth Chai Vasarhelyi and Jimmy Chin	United States, China, Nepal
Fatherland	Vaterland	Paweł Pawlikowski	Poland, France, Germany, Italy
Fjord		Cristian Mungiu	Romania, France, Norway, Sweden, Denmark
Gentle Monster		Marie Kreutzer	Austria, Germany, France
The Idiot(s)		Małgorzata Szumowska and Michał Englert	Poland, Germany
Ink		Danny Boyle	United Kingdom, United States, France
The Liberation		Guy Nattiv	United Kingdom, United States, New Zealand
A Long Winter		Andrew Haigh	Canada, United Kingdom
Making Marie Antoinette		Eleanor Coppola	United States, Italy
The Man I Love		Ira Sachs	United States, France
Minotaur	Минотавр	Andrey Zvyagintsev	France, Germany, Latvia
My Undesirable Friends: Part II – Exile		Julia Loktev	United States
Once Upon a Time in Harlem		William Greaves and David Greaves	United States
The Only Living Pickpocket in New York		Noah Segan	United States
Pete Townshend: Behind Blue Eyes		Frank Marshall and Nigel Sinclair	United States, United Kingdom
Rehearsals for a Revolution	خاطرات ایران	Pegah Ahangarani	Iran, Czech Republic, Spain
Rose		Markus Schleinzer	Austria, Germany
The Row		Bryan Fogel	United States, Australia, Ireland
The Story of Documentary Film		Mark Cousins	Scotland, United Kingdom
Sumo: Spirit Weighs Nothing		Erik Shirai	United States, Japan, United Kingdom, Denmark
Tender Loving Care		Mike Leigh	United Kingdom
Tenzing		Jennifer Peedom	Australia, United Kingdom, United States, India, Nepal
The Unknown	L'Inconnue	Arthur Harari	France, Italy
Wild Horse Nine		Martin McDonagh	United Kingdom, Chile, United States
You Can See Everything (secret screening)		Nathan Fielder and Lance Oppenheim	United States
Restorations
Beau Geste (1926)		Herbert Brenon	United States
Begotten (1989)		E. Elias Merhige	United States
Short films
A Dance Through Time		Sarah Gavron	United Kingdom
The Buffalo Miracle		Ben Proudfoot	United States
Love, Rendered		Liz Garbus	United States
Maybe Tomorrow	أغداً ألقاك	Wafa Mustafa and Waad Al-Kateab	United Kingdom, Syria, Germany
The Revolution Against Death		Joshua Oppenheimer	Denmark, Sweden, United States
Sawyer Avenue, Sunday Afternoon		Bill Morrison	United States
A Song for the Snow Lion		Pawo Choyning Dorji	Bhutan, United States
Witt v. Air Force		Ben Proudfoot	United States

=== Guest Directors' Selection ===
This year's guest director was the English actress Rebecca Hall, the following films were selected to be screened in partnership with Turner Classic Movies:

Title	Director(s)	Production Country
Akenfield (1974)	Peter Hall	United Kingdom
Margaret (2011)	Kenneth Lonergan	United States
Portrait of Jason (1967)	Shirley Clarke	United States
The Servant (1963)	Joseph Losey	United Kingdom
Synecdoche, New York (2008)	Charlie Kaufman	United States
What's Up, Doc? (1972)	Peter Bogdanovich	United States

=== Special Screenings ===
The following films were selected to be screened:

Title	Director(s)	Production Country
2001: A Space Odyssey (1968)	Stanley Kubrick	United Kingdom, United States
Across the Universe (2007)	Julie Taymor	United States, United Kingdom
The Bridge on the River Kwai (1957)	David Lean	United Kingdom
Christine (2016)	Antonio Campos	United States, United Kingdom
Marie Antoinette (2006)	Sofia Coppola	France, United States, Japan
Moonlight (2016)	Barry Jenkins	United States
Teenage Sex and Death at Camp Miasma	Jane Schoenbrun	United States

=== Backlot ===
Behind-the-scenes movies and portraits of artists, musicians and filmmakers, will present the following programs, all free and open to the public:

English Title	Original Title	Director(s)	Production Country
The Golden Age	L'Âge d'Or	Bérenger Thouin	France, Italy
House of Criticism		Alison Chernick	United States
The Illusion of an Everlasting Summer	La ilusión de un verano sin fin	Alessandra Sanguinetti	Argentina, United States
Into the Breach		Freddie Fox	United Kingdom
Maverick: The Epic Adventures of David Lean		Barnaby Thompson	United Kingdom
The Natural State		Matthew Dougherty	United States
One More Time		Cindy Kleine and André Gregory	United States
The Stars Watch from Long Ago		Stacey Steers	United States
Zero Intention of Living Quietly		Edward Lovelace	United Kingdom
