= Daniel Patrick Moynihan =

American politician (1927–2003)

Pat Moynihan
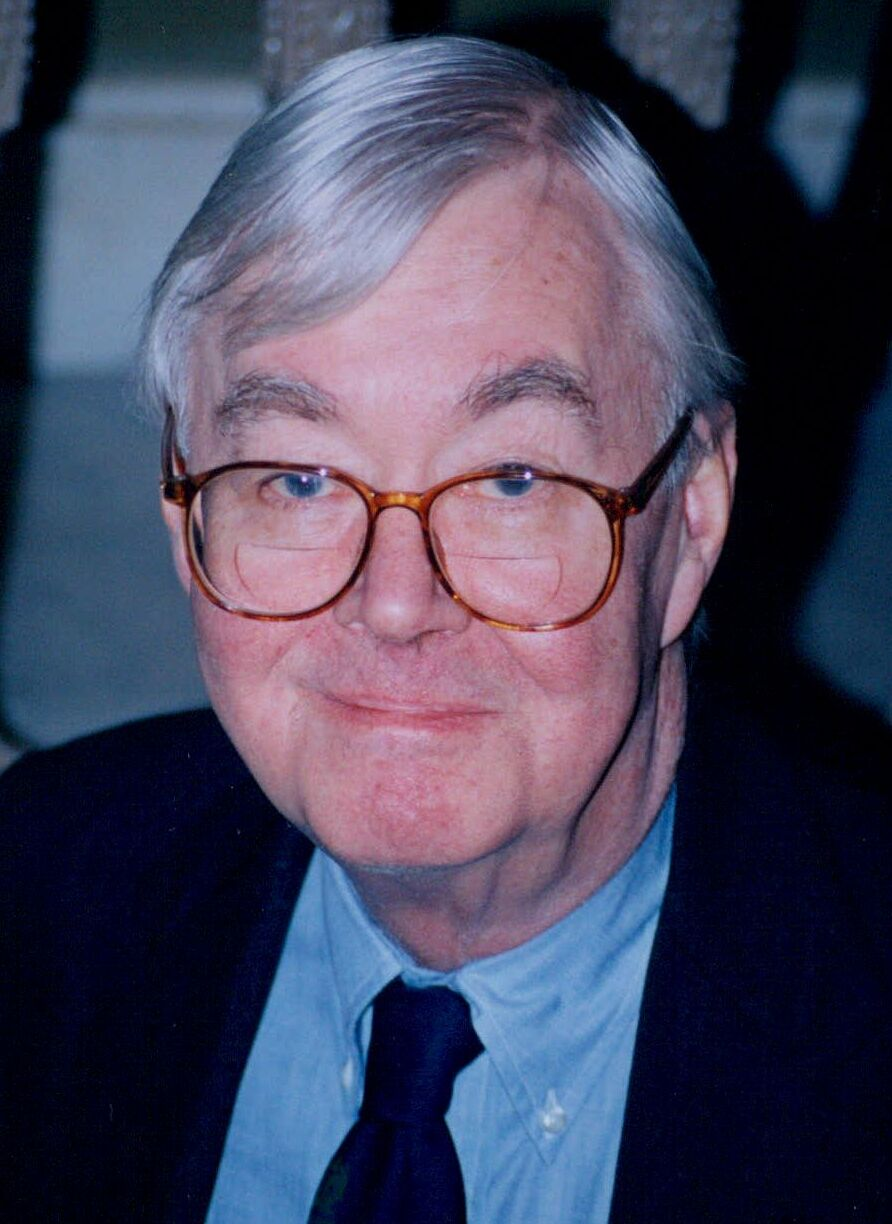
- Moynihan in 1998

United States Senator from New York
- In office January 3, 1977 – January 3, 2001
- Preceded by: James Buckley
- Succeeded by: Hillary Clinton
Senate positions
Ranking Member of the Senate Finance Committee
In office January 3, 1995 – January 3, 2001
Preceded by	Bob Packwood
Succeeded by	Chuck Grassley
Chair of the Senate Finance Committee
In office January 3, 1993 – January 3, 1995
Preceded by	Lloyd Bentsen
Succeeded by	Bob Packwood
Chair of the Senate Environment Committee
In office September 8, 1992 – January 3, 1993
Preceded by	Quentin Burdick
Succeeded by	Max Baucus
Ranking Member of the Senate Intelligence Committee
In office January 3, 1981 – January 3, 1985
Preceded by	Barry Goldwater
Succeeded by	Patrick Leahy

12th United States Ambassador to the United Nations
- In office June 30, 1975 – February 2, 1976
- President: Gerald Ford
- Preceded by: John Scali
- Succeeded by: Bill Scranton

10th United States Ambassador to India
- In office February 28, 1973 – January 7, 1975
- President: Richard Nixon; Gerald Ford
- Preceded by: Kenneth Keating
- Succeeded by: Bill Saxbe

Counselor to the President
- In office November 5, 1969 – December 31, 1970
- President: Richard Nixon
- Preceded by: Arthur F. Burns
- Succeeded by: Donald Rumsfeld

White House Urban Affairs Advisor
- In office January 23 – November 4, 1969
- President: Richard Nixon
- Preceded by: Joe Califano (Domestic Affairs)
- Succeeded by: John Ehrlichman (Domestic Affairs)

Personal details
- Born: March 16, 1927 Tulsa, Oklahoma, U.S.
- Died: March 26, 2003 (aged 76) Washington, D.C., U.S.
- Resting place: Arlington National Cemetery
- Party: Democratic
- Spouse: Elizabeth Brennan (m. 1955)
- Children: 3
- Relatives: Michael Avedon (grandson)
- Education: Tufts University (BS, BA, MA, PhD); London School of Economics (attended)

Military service
- Branch/service: United States Navy
- Years of service: 1944–1947
- Rank: Lieutenant (junior grade)
- Unit: USS Quirinus (ARL-39)
- Moynihan's voice Moynihan on the discontinuation of public sales of Black Talon ammunition. Recorded November 22, 1993

Daniel Patrick "Pat" Moynihan (/ˈmɔɪnɪhæn/; March 16, 1927 – March 26, 2003) was an American politician, diplomat and social scientist. A member of the Democratic Party, he represented New York in the United States Senate from 1977 until 2001 after serving as an adviser to President Richard Nixon, and as the United States' ambassador to India and to the United Nations.

Born in Tulsa, Oklahoma, Moynihan moved at a young age to New York City. Following a stint in the navy, he earned a Ph.D. in history from Tufts University. He worked on the staff of New York Governor W. Averell Harriman before joining President John F. Kennedy's administration in 1961. He served as an Assistant Secretary of Labor under Presidents Kennedy and Lyndon B. Johnson, devoting much of his time to the War on Poverty. In 1965, he published the Moynihan Report on black poverty. Moynihan left the Johnson administration in 1965 and became a professor at Harvard University.

In 1969, he accepted Nixon's offer to serve as an Assistant to the President for Domestic Policy, and he was elevated to the position of Counselor to the President later that year. He left the administration at the end of 1970, and accepted appointment as United States Ambassador to India in 1973. He accepted President Gerald Ford's appointment to the position of United States Ambassador to the United Nations in 1975, holding that position until early 1976; later that year he won election to the Senate.

Moynihan served as Chairman of the Senate Environment Committee from 1992 to 1993 and as Chairman of the Senate Finance Committee from 1993 to 1995. He also led the Moynihan Secrecy Commission, which studied the regulation of classified information. He emerged as a strong critic of President Ronald Reagan's foreign policy and opposed President Bill Clinton's health care plan. He frequently broke with liberal positions, but opposed welfare reform in the 1990s. He also voted against the Defense of Marriage Act, the North American Free Trade Agreement, and the Congressional authorization for the Gulf War. He was tied with Jacob Javits as the longest-serving senator from the state of New York until they were both surpassed by Chuck Schumer in 2023.

== Early life and education ==
Moynihan was born in Tulsa, Oklahoma, the son of Margaret Ann (née Phipps), a homemaker, and John Henry Moynihan, a reporter for a daily newspaper in Tulsa but originally from Indiana. He moved at the age of six with his Irish Catholic family to New York City; his father deserted the family three years later. Brought up in the working-class neighborhood of Hell's Kitchen, he shined shoes and attended various public, private, and parochial schools, ultimately graduating from Benjamin Franklin High School in East Harlem. He was a parishioner of St. Raphael's Church, where he also cast his first vote. He and his brother, Michael Willard Moynihan, spent most of their childhood summers at their grandfather's farm in Bluffton, Indiana. Moynihan briefly worked as a longshoreman before entering the City College of New York (CCNY), which at that time provided free higher education to city residents.

He also had a half-brother, Thomas Joseph Stapelfeld, born on June 28, 1941, to their mother and Henry Charles Stapelfeld.

Following a year at CCNY, Moynihan joined the United States Navy in 1944. He was assigned to the V-12 Navy College Training Program at Middlebury College from 1944 to 1945 and then enrolled as a Naval Reserve Officers Training Corps student at Tufts University, where he received an undergraduate degree in naval science in 1946. He completed active service as Gunnery officer of the USS Quirinus at the rank of lieutenant (junior grade) in 1947. Moynihan then returned to Tufts, where he completed a second undergraduate degree in sociology cum laude in 1948 and earned an MA from the Fletcher School of Law and Diplomacy in 1949.

After failing the Foreign Service Officer exam, he continued his doctoral studies at the Fletcher School as a Fulbright fellow at the London School of Economics from 1950 to 1953. During this period, Moynihan struggled with writer's block and began to fashion himself as a "dandy", cultivating "a taste for Savile Row suits, rococo conversational riffs and Churchillian oratory" even as he maintained that "nothing and no one at LSE ever disposed me to be anything but a New York Democrat who had some friends who worked on the docks and drank beer after work." He also worked for two years as a civilian employee at RAF South Ruislip.

He ultimately received a PhD in history from Tufts (with a dissertation on the relationship between the United States and the International Labour Organization) from the Fletcher School of Law and Diplomacy in 1961 while serving as an assistant professor of political science and director of a government research project centered around Averell Harriman's papers at Syracuse University's Maxwell School of Citizenship and Public Affairs.

== Political career and return to academia ==
Moynihan's political career started in the 1950s, when he served as a member of New York Governor Averell Harriman's staff in a variety of positions (including speechwriter and acting secretary to the governor). He met his future wife, Elizabeth (Liz) Brennan, who also worked on Harriman's staff.

This period ended following Harriman's loss to Nelson Rockefeller in the 1958 general election. Moynihan returned to academia, serving as a lecturer for brief periods at Russell Sage College (1957–1958) and the Cornell University School of Industrial and Labor Relations (1959) before taking a tenure-track position at Syracuse University (1959–1961). During this period, Moynihan was a delegate to the 1960 Democratic National Convention as part of John F. Kennedy's delegate pool.

=== Kennedy and Johnson administrations ===
Moynihan first served in the Kennedy administration as special (1961–1962) and executive (1962–1963) assistant to Labor Secretaries Arthur J. Goldberg and W. Willard Wirtz. In 1962, he authored the directive "Guiding Principles for Federal Architecture", which discouraged use of an official style for federal buildings, and has been credited with enabling "a wide ranging set of innovative public building projects" in subsequent decades, including the San Francisco Federal Building and the United States Courthouse in Austin, Texas.

He was then appointed as Assistant Secretary of Labor for Policy, Planning and Research, serving from 1963 to 1965 under Kennedy and Lyndon B. Johnson. In this capacity, he did not have operational responsibilities. He devoted his time to trying to formulate national policy for what would become the War on Poverty. His small staff included Ralph Nader.

They took inspiration from historian Stanley Elkins's Slavery: A Problem in American Institutional and Intellectual Life (1959). Elkins essentially contended that slavery had made black Americans dependent on the dominant society, and that such dependence still existed a century later after the American Civil War. Moynihan and his staff believed that government must go beyond simply ensuring that members of minority groups have the same rights as the majority and must also "act affirmatively" in order to counter the problem of historic discrimination.

Moynihan's research of Labor Department data demonstrated that even as fewer people were unemployed, more people were joining the welfare rolls. These recipients were families with children but only one parent (almost invariably the mother). The laws at that time permitted such families to receive welfare payments in certain parts of the United States.

==== Controversy over the War on Poverty ====
Moynihan issued his research in 1965 under the title The Negro Family: The Case For National Action, now commonly known as The Moynihan Report. Moynihan's report fueled a debate over the proper course for government to take with regard to the economic underclass, especially blacks. Critics on the left attacked it as "blaming the victim", a slogan coined by psychologist William Ryan. Some suggested that Moynihan was propagating the views of racists because much of the press coverage of the report focused on the discussion of children being born out of wedlock. Despite Moynihan's warnings, the Aid to Families with Dependent Children (AFDC) program included rules for payments only if no "Man [was] in the house." Critics of the program's structure, including Moynihan, said that the nation was paying poor women to throw their husbands out of the house.

After the 1994 Republican sweep of Congress, Moynihan agreed that correction was needed for a welfare system that possibly encouraged women to raise their children without fathers: "The Republicans are saying we have a hell of a problem, and we do."

=== Local New York City politics and ongoing academic career ===
By the 1964 presidential election, Moynihan was recognized as a political ally of Robert F. Kennedy. For this reason he was not favored by then-President Johnson, and he left the Johnson Administration in 1965. He ran for office in the Democratic Party primary for the presidency of the New York City Council, a position now known as the New York City Public Advocate. However, he was defeated by Queens District Attorney Frank D. O'Connor.

Throughout this transitional period, Moynihan maintained an academic affiliation as a fellow at Wesleyan University's Center for Advanced Studies from 1964 to 1967. In 1966, he was appointed to the faculties of Harvard University's Graduate School of Education and Graduate School of Public Administration as a full professor of education and urban politics. After commencing a second extended leave because of his public service in 1973, his faculty line was transferred to the university's Department of Government, where he remained until 1977. From 1966 to 1969, he also held a secondary administrative appointment as director of the Harvard–MIT Joint Center for Urban Studies. With turmoil and riots in the United States, Moynihan, "a national board member of ADA incensed at the radicalism of the current anti-war and Black Power movements", decided to "call for a formal alliance between liberals and conservatives", and wrote that the next administration would have to be able to unite the nation again.

=== Nixon administration ===
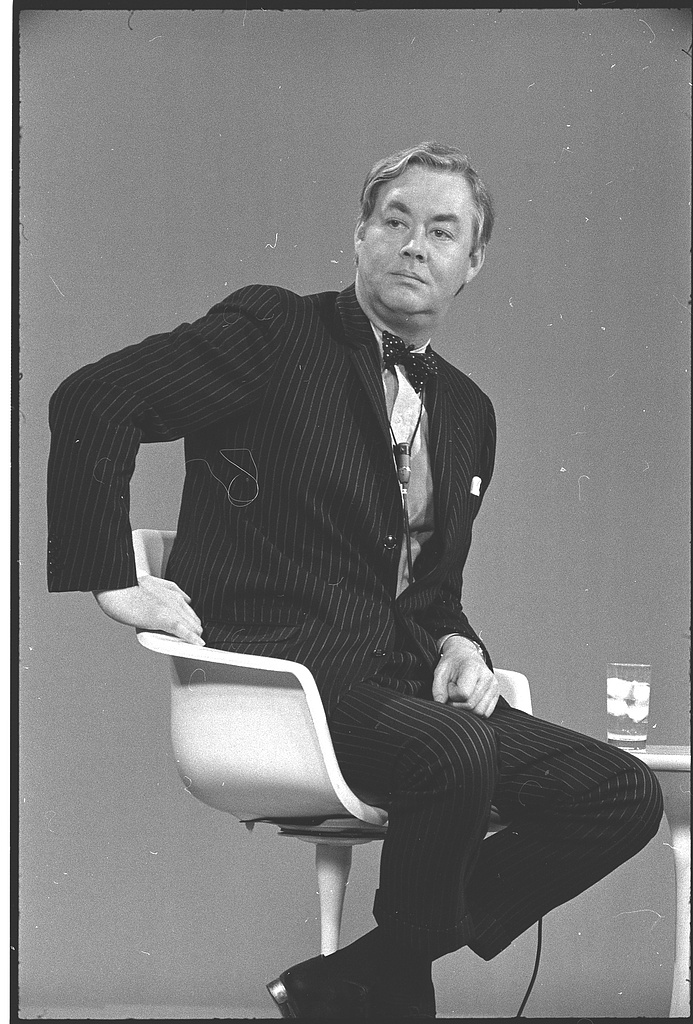
Moynihan in 1969

Connecting with President-elect Richard Nixon in 1968, Moynihan joined the Executive Office of the President in January 1969 as Assistant to the President for Domestic Policy and executive secretary of the Council of Urban Affairs (later the Urban Affairs Council), a forerunner of the Domestic Policy Council envisaged as an analog to the United States National Security Council. As one of the few people in Nixon's inner circle who had done academic research related to social policies, he was very influential in the early months of the administration. However, his disdain for "traditional budget-conscious positions" (including his proposed Family Assistance Plan, a "negative income tax or guaranteed minimum income" for families that met work requirements or demonstrated that they were seeking work which ultimately stalled in the Senate) led to frequent clashes (belying their unwavering mutual respect) with Nixon's principal domestic policy advisor, conservative economist and Cabinet-rank Counselor to the President Arthur F. Burns.

While formulating the Family Assistance Plan proposal, Moynihan conducted significant discussions concerning a Basic Income Guarantee with Russell B. Long and Louis O. Kelso.

Although Moynihan was promoted to Counselor to the President for Urban Affairs with Cabinet rank shortly after Burns was nominated by Nixon to serve as Chair of the Federal Reserve in October 1969, it was concurrently announced that Moynihan would be returning to Harvard (a stipulation of his leave from the university) at the end of 1970. Operational oversight of the Urban Affairs Council was given to Moynihan's nominal successor as Domestic Policy Assistant, former White House Counsel John Ehrlichman. This decision was instigated by White House Chief of Staff H. R. Haldeman, a close friend of Ehrlichman since college and his main patron in the administration. Haldeman's maneuvering situated Moynihan in a more peripheral context as the administration's "resident thinker" on domestic affairs for the duration of his service.

In 1969, on Nixon's initiative, NATO tried to establish a third civil column by creating a hub for research and initiatives in the civil area that also addressed environmental topics. Moynihan named acid rain and the greenhouse effect as suitable international challenges to be dealt by NATO. NATO was chosen, since the organization had suitable expertise in the field, as well as experience with international research coordination. The German government was skeptical and saw the initiative as an attempt by the US to regain international terrain after the lost Vietnam War. The topics gained momentum in civil conferences and institutions.

In 1970, Moynihan wrote a memo to President Nixon saying, "The time may have come when the issue of race could benefit from a period of 'benign neglect'. The subject has been too much talked about. The forum has been too much taken over to hysterics, paranoids, and boodlers on all sides. We need a period in which Negro progress continues and racial rhetoric fades." Moynihan regretted that, as he saw it, critics misinterpreted his memo as advocating that the government should neglect minorities.

=== UN Ambassador ===
Following the October 1969 reorganization of the White House domestic policy staff, Moynihan was offered the position of United States Ambassador to the United Nations (then held by career Foreign Service Officer Charles Woodruff Yost) by Nixon on November 17, 1969; after initially accepting the president's offer, he decided to remain in Washington when the Family Assistance Plan stalled in the Senate Finance Committee. On November 24, 1970, he refused a second offer from Nixon due to potential familial strain and ongoing financial problems; depression stemming from the repudiation of the Family Assistance Plan by liberal Democrats; and the inability to effect change due to static policy directives in the position, which he considered to be a tertiary role behind Assistant to the President for National Security Affairs Henry Kissinger and United States Secretary of State William P. Rogers. Instead, he commuted from Harvard as a part-time member of the United States delegation during the ambassadorship of George H. W. Bush.

In 1973, Moynihan (who was circumspect toward the administration's "tilt" to Pakistan) accepted Nixon's offer to serve as United States Ambassador to India, where he would remain until 1975. The relationship between the two countries was at a low point following the Indo-Pakistani War of 1971. Ambassador Moynihan was alarmed that two great democracies were cast as antagonists, and set out to fix things. He proposed that part of the burdensome debt be written off, part used to pay for U.S. embassy expenses in India, and the remaining converted into Indian rupees to fund an Indo-US cultural and educational exchange program that lasted for a quarter century. On February 18, 1974, he presented to the Government of India a check for 16,640,000,000 rupees, then equivalent to $2,046,700,000, which was the greatest amount paid by a single check in the history of banking. The "Rupee Deal" is logged in the Guinness Book of World Records for the world's largest check, presented to India's Secretary of Economic Affairs.

In June 1975, Moynihan accepted his third offer to serve as United States Ambassador to the United Nations, a position (including a rotation as President of the United Nations Security Council) that he would only hold until February 1976. Under President Gerald Ford, Ambassador Moynihan took a hardline anti-communist stance, in line with the agenda of the White House at the time. He was also a strong supporter of Israel, condemning UN Resolution 3379, which declared Zionism to be a form of racism. Moynihan's wife Liz later recalled being approached in the UN galleries by Palestine Liberation Organization Permanent Observer Zuhdi Labib Terzi during the controversy. He made a remark of which she later did not remember the exact phrasing, but rendered it approximately as 'you must have mixed feelings about remembering events in New Delhi', which she and biographer Gil Troy interpreted as a threatening reference to a failed assassination plan against her husband two years earlier. But the American public responded enthusiastically to his moral outrage over the resolution; his condemnation of the "Zionism is Racism" resolution brought him celebrity status and helped him win a Senate seat a year later. Moynihan opposed the resolution because he thought it was completely false and perverse. Also, his years in New York sensitized him on a pragmatic issue: "resolution against Zionism not only affected Israel but every Zionist people, which included the majority of American Jews", which became clear when that community promoted a touristic boycott against Mexico as a consequence of its vote for the approval of the Resolution. In his book, Moynihan's Moment, Gil Troy posits that Moynihan's 1975 UN speech opposing the resolution was the key moment of his political career.

In 1975, Moynihan requested Secretary Kissinger to allow him to take the issue of Soviet involvement in Angola "... to the UNGA and to the UNSC and never let the argument fade until the last Cuban was out of African." Moynihan was refused but his lobbying efforts secured the withdrawal of a UNGA-proposed resolution that only condemned South African intervention in Angola. Moynihan forced a political setback on the USSR through the UNGA where he publicly attacked the Soviet Union for trying to "recolonize" Africa and by calling it "a new colonial, imperialist power". Moynihan's victory was also notable due to it being the first time in at least a decade that the US deprived the USSR of a UNGA majority on the issue of imperialism and colonialism.

Perhaps the most controversial action of Moynihan's career was his response, as Ambassador to the UN, to the Indonesian invasion of East Timor in 1975. Gerald Ford considered Indonesia, then under a military dictatorship, a key ally against Communism, which was influential in East Timor. Moynihan ensured that the UN Security Council took no action against the larger nation's annexation of a small country. The Indonesian invasion caused the deaths of 100,000–200,000 Timorese through violence, illness, and hunger. In his memoir, Moynihan wrote:

The United States wished things to turn out as they did, and worked to bring this about. The Department of State desired that the United Nations prove utterly ineffective in whatever measures it undertook. This task was given to me, and I carried it forward with no inconsiderable success.

Later, he said he had defended a "shameless" Cold War policy toward East Timor.

Moynihan's thinking began to change during his tenure at the UN. In his 1993 book on nationalism, Pandaemonium, he wrote that as time progressed, he began to view the Soviet Union in less ideological terms. He regarded it less as an expansionist, imperialist Marxist state, and more as a weak realist state in decline. He believed it was most motivated by self-preservation. This view would influence his thinking in subsequent years, when he became an outspoken proponent of the then-unpopular view that the Soviet Union was a failed state headed for implosion.

Nevertheless, Moynihan's tenure at the UN marked the beginnings of a more bellicose, neoconservative American foreign policy that turned away from Kissinger's unabashedly covert, détente-driven realpolitik. Although it was never substantiated, Moynihan initially believed that Kissinger directed Ivor Richard, the Permanent Representative of the United Kingdom to the United Nations, to publicly denounce his actions as "Wyatt Earp" diplomacy. Demoralized, Moynihan resigned from what he would subsequently characterize as an "abbreviated posting" in February 1976. In Pandaemonium, Moynihan expounded upon this decision, maintaining that he was "something of an embarrassment to my own government, and fairly soon left before I was fired."

=== United States Senator from New York (1977–2001) ===
In November 1976, Moynihan was elected to the United States Senate from the State of New York, defeating U.S. Representative Bella Abzug, former U.S. Attorney General Ramsey Clark, New York City Council President Paul O'Dwyer and businessman Abraham Hirschfeld in the Democratic primary, and Conservative Party incumbent James L. Buckley in the general election. He also was nominated by the Liberal Party of New York. Shortly after election, Moynihan analyzed the State of New York's budget to determine whether it was paying out more in federal taxes than it received in spending. Finding that it was, he produced a yearly report known as the Fisc (from the French). Moynihan's strong support for Israel while UN Ambassador inspired support for him among the state's large Jewish population.

In an August 7, 1978 speech to the Senate, following the jailing of M. A. Farber, Moynihan stated the possibility of Congress having to become involved with securing press freedom and that the Senate should be aware of the issue's seriousness.

Moynihan's strong advocacy for New York's interests in the Senate, buttressed by the Fisc reports and recalling his strong advocacy for US positions in the UN, did at least on one occasion allow his advocacy to escalate into a physical attack. Senator Kit Bond, nearing retirement in 2010, recalled with some embarrassment in a conversation on civility in political discourse that Moynihan had once "slugged [Bond] on the Senate floor after Bond denounced an earmark Moynihan had slipped into a highway appropriations bill. Some months later Moynihan apologized, and the two occasionally would relax in Moynihan's office after a long day to discuss their shared interest in urban renewal over a glass of port."

Moynihan continued to be interested in foreign policy as a Senator, sitting on the Select Committee on Intelligence. His strongly anti-Soviet views became far more moderate when he emerged as a critic of the Reagan administration's hawkish tilt in the late Cold War, as exemplified by its support for the Contras in Nicaragua. Moynihan argued there was no active Soviet-backed conspiracy in Latin America, or anywhere. He suggested the Soviets were suffering from massive internal problems, such as rising ethnic nationalism and a collapsing economy. In a December 21, 1986 editorial in The New York Times, Moynihan predicted the replacement on the world stage of Communist expansion with ethnic conflicts. He criticized the administration's "consuming obsession with the expansion of Communism – which is not in fact going on." In a September 8, 1990 letter to Erwin Griswold, Moynihan wrote: "I have one purpose left in life; or at least in the Senate. It is to try to sort out what would be involved in reconstituting the American government in the aftermath of the [C]old [W]ar. Huge changes took place, some of which we hardly notice." In 1981, he and fellow Irish-American politicians Senator Ted Kennedy and Speaker of the House Tip O'Neill co-founded the Friends of Ireland, a bipartisan organization of Senators and Representatives who opposed the ongoing sectarian violence and aimed to promote peace and reconciliation in Northern Ireland.

Moynihan introduced Section 1706 of the Tax Reform Act of 1986, which cost certain professionals (like computer programmers, engineers, draftspersons, and designers) who depended on intermediary agencies (consulting firms) a self-employed tax status option, but other professionals (like accountants and lawyers) continued to enjoy Section 530 exemptions from payroll taxes. This change in the tax code was expected to offset the tax revenue losses of other legislation that Moynihan proposed to change the law of foreign taxes of Americans working abroad. Joseph Stack, who flew his airplane into a building housing IRS offices on February 18, 2010, posted a suicide note that, among many factors, mentioned the Section 1706 change to the Internal Revenue Code.

As a key Environment and Public Works Committee member, Moynihan gave vital support and guidance to William K. Reilly, who served under President George H. W. Bush as Administrator of the Environmental Protection Agency.

Moynihan was criticized after making offensive comments towards a woman of Jamaican descent at Vassar College in early 1990. During a question-and-answer session, Moynihan reportedly told Folami Grey, an official at the Dutchess County Youth Bureau, "If you don't like it in this country, why don't you pack your bags and go back where you came from?" This incident caused a protest in which 100 students took over the college's main administration building in response to his comments.

External videos
- Tribute to Senator Daniel Patrick Moynihan, Wilson International Center for Scholars, March 17, 1997 (part one), C-SPAN
- Tribute to Moynihan at the Wilson Center, March 17, 1997 (part two), C-SPAN
- Panel discussion on Moynihan's life and career, held at the Museum of the City of New York, October 18, 2010, C-SPAN

In the mid-1990s, Moynihan was one of the Democrats to support the ban on the procedure known as partial-birth abortion. He said of the procedure: "I think this is just too close to infanticide. A child has been born and it has exited the uterus. What on Earth is this procedure?" Earlier in his career in the Senate, Moynihan had expressed his annoyance with the adamantly pro-choice interest groups petitioning him and others on the issue. He challenged them saying, "you women are ruining the Democratic Party with your insistence on abortion."

Moynihan broke with orthodox liberal positions of his party on numerous occasions. As chairman of the Senate Finance Committee in the 1990s, he strongly opposed President Bill Clinton's proposal to expand health care coverage to all Americans. Seeking to focus the debate over health insurance on the financing of health care, Moynihan garnered controversy by stating that "there is no health care crisis in this country."

On other issues though, he was much more progressive. He voted against the death penalty; the flag desecration amendment; the balanced budget amendment, the Private Securities Litigation Reform Act; the Defense of Marriage Act; the Communications Decency Act; and the North American Free Trade Agreement. He was critical of proposals to replace the progressive income tax with a flat tax. Moynihan also voted against authorization of the Gulf War. Despite his earlier writings on the negative effects of the welfare state, he voted against welfare reform in 1996, a bill that set time limits on benefits and imposed work requirements. He was sharply critical of the bill and certain Democrats who crossed party lines to support it.

== Public speaker ==
Moynihan was a popular public speaker with a distinctly patrician style. He spoke with a slight stutter, which led him to draw out vowels. Linguist Geoffrey Nunberg compared his speaking style to that of William F. Buckley, Jr.

== Commission on Government Secrecy ==
In the post-Cold War era, the 103rd Congress enacted legislation directing an inquiry into the uses of government secrecy. Moynihan chaired the commission, which studied and made recommendations on the "culture of secrecy" that pervaded the United States government and its intelligence community for 80 years, beginning with the Espionage Act of 1917, and made recommendations on the statutory regulation of classified information.

The commission's findings and recommendations were presented to the President in 1997. As part of the effort, Moynihan secured release from the Federal Bureau of Investigation of its classified Venona file. This file documents the FBI's joint counterintelligence investigation, with the United States Signals Intelligence Service, into Soviet espionage within the United States. Much of the information had been collected and classified as secret information for over 50 years.

After release of the information, Moynihan authored Secrecy: The American Experience where he discussed the impact government secrecy has had on the domestic politics of America for the past half century, and how myths and suspicion created an unnecessary partisan chasm.

== Personal life ==
Moynihan married Elizabeth Therese Brennan (1929–2023), a Harriman campaign worker in the 1954 New York gubernatorial election, in May 1955. They had three children, Timothy, Maura and John, as well as two grandchildren, including photographer Michael Avedon.

== Death ==
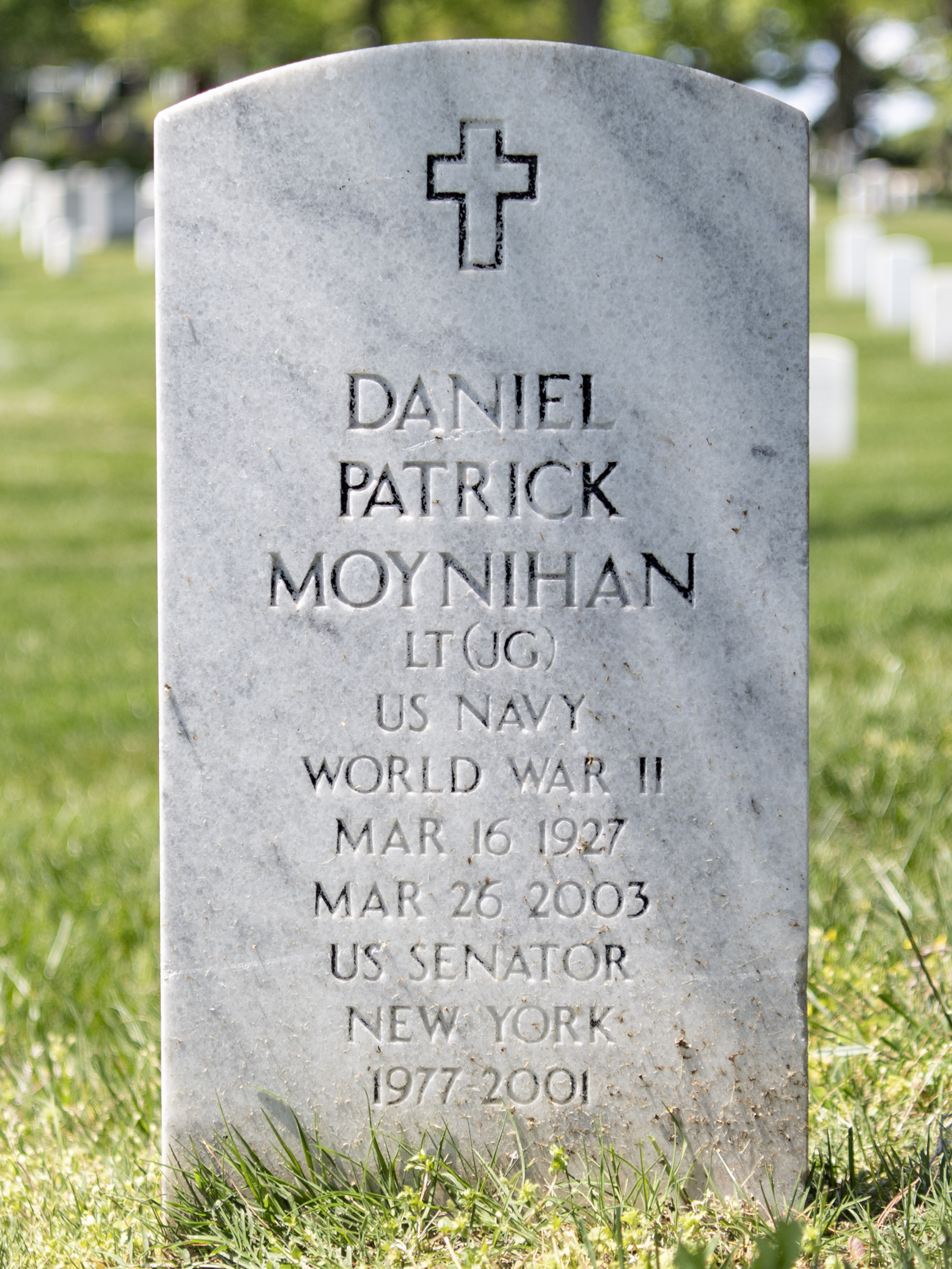
Moynihan's gravestone at Arlington National Cemetery

Moynihan died at Washington Hospital Center on March 26, 2003, from complications of a ruptured appendix, 10 days after his 76th birthday.

== Career as scholar ==
As a public intellectual, Moynihan published articles on urban ethnic politics and on the problems of the poor in cities of the Northeast in numerous publications, including Commentary and The Public Interest.

Moynihan coined the term "professionalization of reform", by which the government bureaucracy thinks up problems for government to solve rather than simply responding to problems identified elsewhere.

In 1983, he was awarded the Hubert H. Humphrey Award given by the American Political Science Association "in recognition of notable public service by a political scientist." He wrote 19 books, leading his personal friend, columnist and former professor George F. Will, to remark that Moynihan "wrote more books than most senators have read." After retiring from the Senate, he rejoined the faculty of the Maxwell School of Citizenship and Public Affairs at Syracuse University, where he began his academic career in 1959.

Moynihan's scholarly accomplishments led Michael Barone, writing in The Almanac of American Politics to describe the senator as "the nation's best thinker among politicians since Lincoln and its best politician among thinkers since Jefferson." Moynihan's 1993 article, "Defining Deviancy Down", was notably controversial. Writer and historian Kenneth Weisbrode describes Moynihan's book Pandaemonium as uncommonly prescient.

=== Selected books ===
- Beyond the Melting Pot, an influential study of American ethnicity, which he co-authored with Nathan Glazer (1963)
- The Negro Family: The Case For National Action, known as the Moynihan Report (1965)
- Maximum Feasible Misunderstanding: Community Action in the War on Poverty (1969) ISBN 0-02-922000-9
- Violent Crimes (1970) ISBN 0-8076-6053-1
- Coping: Essays on the Practice of Government (1973) ISBN 0-394-48324-3
- The Politics of a Guaranteed Income: The Nixon Administration and the Family Assistance Plan (1973) ISBN 0-394-46354-4.
- Business and Society in Change (1975) OCLC 1440432
- A Dangerous Place coauthor Suzanne Garment, (1978) ISBN 0-316-58699-4
- Best Editorial Cartoons of the Year, 1980 (1980) ISBN 1-56554-516-8
- Family and Nation: The Godkin Lectures (1986) ISBN 0-15-630140-7
- Came the Revolution (1988)
- On the Law of Nations (1990) ISBN 0-674-63576-0
- Pandaemonium: Ethnicity in International Politics (1994) ISBN 0-19-827946-9
- Miles to Go: A Personal History of Social Policy (1996) ISBN 0-674-57441-9
- Secrecy: The American Experience (1998) ISBN 0-300-08079-4
- Future of the Family (2003) ISBN 0-87154-628-0

== Awards and honors ==
- In 1966, Moynihan was elected to the American Academy of Arts and Sciences
- In 1968, Moynihan was elected to the American Philosophical Society
- The 5th Annual Heinz Award in Public Policy (1999)
- Honorary Doctor of Laws degree from Tufts, his alma mater.
- 1989 Honor Award from the National Building Museum
- In 1989, Moynihan received the U.S. Senator John Heinz Award for Greatest Public Service by an Elected or Appointed Official, an award given out annually by Jefferson Awards.
- On August 9, 2000, he was presented with the Presidential Medal of Freedom by President Clinton.
- In 1992, he was awarded the Laetare Medal by the University of Notre Dame, considered the most prestigious award for American Catholics.
- In 1994, the U.S. Navy Memorial Foundation awarded Moynihan its Lone Sailor Award for his naval service and subsequent government service.

=== Honors ===
- The Moynihan Train Hall, which opened in January 2021, is named for him. It expanded New York Penn Station with a new concourse for Long Island Rail Road and Amtrak passengers in the adjacent, renovated James Farley Post Office building. Moynihan had long championed the project, which is modeled after the original Penn Station; he had shined shoes in the original station as a boy during the Great Depression. During his latter years in the Senate, Moynihan had to secure federal approvals and financing for the project.
- In 2005, the Maxwell School of Citizenship and Public Affairs of Syracuse University renamed its Global Affairs Institute as the Moynihan Institute of Global Affairs.
- The federal district courthouse in Manhattan's Foley Square was named in his honor.

== Quotes ==
- "I don't think there's any point in being Irish if you don't know that the world is going to break your heart eventually. I guess that we thought we had a little more time."
  – Reacting to the assassination of John F. Kennedy, November 1963
- "No one is innocent after the experience of governing. But not everyone is guilty."
  – The Politics of a Guaranteed Income, 1973
- "Secrecy is for losers. For people who do not know how important the information really is."
  – Secrecy: The American Experience, 1998

The quote also adds, "The Soviet Union realized this too late. Openness is now a singular, and singularly American, advantage."

- "The issue of race could benefit from a period of benign neglect."
  – Memo to President Richard Nixon
- "Everyone is entitled to his own opinion, but not his own facts."
  – Column on January 18, 1983 The Washington Post. Based on an earlier quote by James R. Schlesinger.
- (In response to the question: "Why should I work if I am going to just end up emptying slop jars?") "That's a complaint you hear mostly from people who don't empty slop jars. This country has a lot of people who do exactly that for a living. And they do it well. It's not pleasant work, but it's a living. And it has to be done. Somebody has to go around and empty all those bed pans. And it's perfectly honorable work. There's nothing the matter with doing it. Indeed, there is a lot that is right about doing it, as any hospital patient will tell you."
- "Food growing is the first thing you do when you come down out of the trees. The question is, how come the United States can grow food and you can't?"
  – speaking to Third World countries about global famine
- "The central conservative truth is that it is culture, not politics, that determines the success of a society. The central liberal truth is that politics can change a culture and save it from itself."
- "Truman left the Presidency thinking that Whittaker Chambers, Elizabeth Bentley were nuts, crackpots, scoundrels, and I think you could say that a fissure began in American political life that's never really closed. It reverberates, and I can say more about it. But in the main, American liberalism—Arthur Schlesinger, one of the conspicuous examples—got it wrong. We were on the side of the people who denied this, and a president who could have changed his rhetoric, explained it, told the American people, didn't know the facts, they were secret, and they were kept from him."
  – Secrecy: The American Experience, October 1998

== See also ==
- List of U.S. political appointments that crossed party lines
- The Public Interest

Political offices
Preceded by Joe Califano as White House Domestic Affairs Advisor	White House Urban Affairs Advisor; 1969	Succeeded by John Ehrlichman as White House Domestic Affairs Advisor
Preceded by Arthur Burns	Counselor to the President; 1969–1970; Served alongside: Bryce Harlow	Succeeded by Donald Rumsfeld
Diplomatic posts
Preceded by Kenneth Keating	United States Ambassador to India; 1973–1975	Succeeded by Bill Saxbe
Preceded by John Scali	United States Ambassador to the United Nations; 1975–1976	Succeeded by Bill Scranton
Party political offices
Preceded by Richard Ottinger	Democratic nominee for U.S. Senator from New York (Class 1); 1976, 1982, 1988, 1994	Succeeded by Hillary Clinton
Preceded by Charles Goodell	Liberal nominee for U.S. Senator from New York (Class 1); 1976, 1982, 1988, 1994	Succeeded by Hillary Clinton
U.S. Senate
Preceded by James Buckley	U.S. Senator (Class 1) from New York; 1977–2001; Served alongside: Jack Javits, Al D'Amato, Chuck Schumer	Succeeded by Hillary Clinton
Preceded by Barry Goldwater	Vice Chair of the Senate Intelligence Committee; 1981–1985	Succeeded by Patrick Leahy
Preceded by Quentin Burdick	Chair of the Senate Environment Committee; 1992–1993	Succeeded by Max Baucus
Preceded by Lloyd Bentsen	Chair of the Senate Finance Committee; 1993–1995	Succeeded by Bob Packwood
Preceded by Bob Packwood	Ranking Member of the Senate Finance Committee; 1995–2001	Succeeded by Chuck Grassley
