= Alpha Gang =

2026 film by the Zellner brothers

- Directed by: David Zellner; Nathan Zellner
- Screenplay by: David Zellner
- Produced by: David Zellner; Nathan Zellner; Cate Blanchett; Coco Francini; Ryan Zacarias; Gina Gammell; Andrea Bucko; Mary Aloe; Joshua Harris
- Starring: Léa Seydoux; Dave Bautista; Kelvin Harrison Jr.; Lily-Rose Depp; Doona Bae; Riley Keough; Cate Blanchett; Chris Pine; Adria Arjona
- Cinematography: Mike Gioulakis
- Edited by: Daniel Tarr; David Zellner; Nathan Zellner
- Music by: The Octopus Project
- Production companies: ZBi; Dirty Films; Fat City; Felix Culpa; Aloe Entertainment; Sugar Rush Pictures
- Release date: September 5, 2026 (Telluride)
- Running time: 109 minutes
- Countries: United States; Australia
- Language: English

Alpha Gang is a 2026 science fiction comedy film directed by Nathan and David Zellner. The ensemble cast includes Léa Seydoux, Dave Bautista, Kelvin Harrison Jr., Lily-Rose Depp, Bae Doona, Riley Keough, Cate Blanchett, Chris Pine, and Adria Arjona. The story sees a group of humanoid aliens who arrive on Earth, while posing as a biker gang, with the goal of destroying the planet.

The film had its world premiere at the 53rd Telluride Film Festival on September 5, 2026.

== Premise ==
Humanoid aliens arrive on Earth seeking to destroy but they soon find themselves compromised with human emotions.

== Cast ==
- Léa Seydoux as Alpha One
- Dave Bautista as Alpha Two
- Kelvin Harrison Jr. as Alpha Three
- Lily-Rose Depp as Alpha Four
- Bae Doona as Alpha Five
- Riley Keough as Alpha Six
- Cate Blanchett
- Chris Pine
- Adria Arjona

== Production ==
It was announced in June 2020 that David Zellner will direct, alongside his brother Nathan. Andrea Riseborough, Jon Hamm, Nicholas Hoult, Charlotte Gainsbourg, Mackenzie Davis, Sofia Boutella and Steven Yeun were announced to star, with filming expected to begin in 2021 in Europe.

The project went dormant until May 2024, when it was announced that Cate Blanchett was set to star, with the previously announced cast no longer attached. In October, Yeun rejoined the project, with Channing Tatum, Dave Bautista, Léa Seydoux, Zoë Kravitz and Riley Keough added to the cast, and Mike Gioulakis brought on to serve as cinematographer.

Production began on the film in Budapest in June 2025, with Tatum, Kravitz, and Yeun exiting the film, and Chris Pine, Lily-Rose Depp, Adria Arjona, Doona Bae, and Kelvin Harrison Jr. joining the cast. Filming continued in Podgarić, Croatia, at the Monument to the Revolution of the People of Moslavina, in July 2025.

== Release ==
Alpha Gang premiered at the 53rd Telluride Film Festival on September 5, 2026. It was also screened at the Toronto International Film Festival on September 13.

== Reception ==
On review aggregator website Rotten Tomatoes, the film holds an approval rating of 84% based on 19 reviews, with an average rating of 5.5/10. Metacritic, which uses a weighted average, assigned the film a score of 59 out of 100, based on 8 critics, indicating "mixed or average reviews".
