= The Row (film) =

2026 documentary film

- Directed by: Bryan Fogel
- Written by: Bryan Fogel
- Produced by: Bryan Fogel
- Release date: September 4, 2026 (Telluride)
- Running time: 88 minutes
- Country: United States
- Language: English

The Row is a 2026 documentary film which follows endurance athlete Tez Steinberg as he makes a solo rowing expedition across the Pacific Ocean as a way to cope with personal grief and family trauma. It was directed, produced, and co-written by Bryan Fogel. The film premiered at the 2026 Telluride Film Festival.
