= A Long Winter =

2026 drama film by Andrew Haigh

- American theatrical release poster
- Directed by: Andrew Haigh
- Screenplay by: Andrew Haigh
- Based on: "A Long Winter" by Colm Tóibín
- Produced by: Tristan Goligher; Andrew Haigh; Michael Elliott; Chad Oakes; Mike Frislev
- Starring: Fred Hechinger; Ebon Moss-Bachrach; Caitríona Balfe; Kit Connor; D'Pharaoh Woon-A-Tai; David Furr; Manuel Garcia-Rulfo; Martin Freeman
- Cinematography: André Turpin
- Edited by: Jonathan Alberts
- Music by: Paul Haslinger; JG Alberts
- Production companies: The Bureau; Nomadic Pictures; Mubi; Film4
- Distributed by: Films We Like (Canada); Mubi (United Kingdom)
- Release dates: September 4, 2026 (Telluride); January 14, 2027 (United Kingdom)
- Running time: 119 minutes
- Countries: Canada; United Kingdom
- Language: English

A Long Winter is a 2026 drama film written and directed by Andrew Haigh, based on the 2006 short story by Colm Tóibín, and is a co-production of Canada and the United Kingdom. It stars Fred Hechinger, Ebon Moss-Bachrach, Caitríona Balfe, Kit Connor, D'Pharaoh Woon-A-Tai, David Furr, Manuel Garcia-Rulfo, and Martin Freeman.

The film premiered at the 53rd Telluride Film Festival on September 4, 2026, and will be released in the United Kingdom on January 15, 2027. It received positive reviews from critics.

== Cast ==
- Fred Hechinger as Mike
- Ebon Moss-Bachrach as Lester, Mike's father
- Caitríona Balfe as Louise, Mike's mother
- Kit Connor as Tommy, Mike's brother
- D'Pharaoh Woon-A-Tai as Jimmy
- David Furr as Ben
- Manuel Garcia-Rulfo as Joe
- Martin Freeman as Frank, Louise's brother

== Production ==
Written and directed by Andrew Haigh, the film is an adaptation of the short story written by Colm Tóibín. It is produced by Tristan Goligher for The Bureau, Chad Oakes and Mike Frislev for Nomadic Pictures, and Michael Elliott. The film was developed by Mubi, with co-financing from Film4. André Turpin serves as cinematographer and Jonathan Alberts as editor.

The cast of the film includes Fred Hechinger, Kit Connor and D'Pharaoh Woon-A-Tai. Ebon Moss-Bachrach, Manuel Garcia-Rulfo, and Caitríona Balfe joined the cast in October 2025, with principal photography under way that month in Alberta, Canada.

== Release ==
A Long Winter premiered at the 53rd Telluride Film Festival. It will have its Canadian premiere in the Special Presentations section at the 2026 Toronto International Film Festival on 11 September 2026. It was also selected for the Main Slate of the 2026 New York Film Festival. A Long Winter was selected as the opening film for the 2026 Refocus Film Festival in Iowa City, Iowa.

Mubi will release the film in the United Kingdom on 15 January 2027. In the United States, it will released in select theaters in New York on 4 December, before a wider release on 22 January 2027.

== Reception ==
On the review aggregator website Rotten Tomatoes, the film holds an approval rating of 80%, based on 30 reviews, with an average rating of 6.2/10. On Metacritic, the film has a weighted average score of 77 out of 100, based on 11 critics, indicating "generally favorable" reviews.

Peter Bradshaw in The Guardian awarded the film five stars, praising the acting and the cinematographer André Turpin, describing the film as a "fascinating, affecting and enigmatic study" of manhood.

Haig was nominated for Best Director at the British Independent Film Awards with nominations also for Best Cinematography, Best Costume Design, and Best Sound.
