= Richard Avedon =

American photographer (1923–2004)

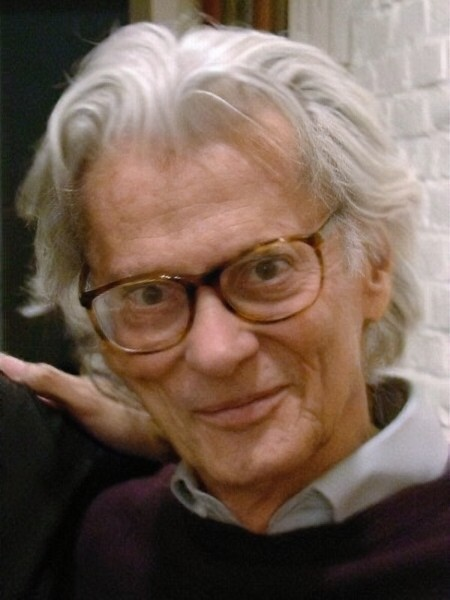
- Avedon in 2004
- Born: May 15, 1923; New York City, U.S.
- Died: October 1, 2004 (aged 81); San Antonio, Texas, U.S.
- Education: The New School for Social Research
- Spouses: Doe Avedon (m. 1944; div. 1949) Evelyn Franklin (m. 1951)
- Children: 1
- Relatives: Michael Avedon (grandson)

Richard Avedon (May 15, 1923 – October 1, 2004) was an American fashion and portrait photographer. He worked for Harper's Bazaar, Vogue, and Elle, specializing in capturing movement in still pictures of fashion, theater and dance. An obituary published in The New York Times said that "his fashion and portrait photographs helped define America's image of style, beauty and culture for the last half-century".

== Early life and education ==
Avedon was born in New York City to a Jewish family. His father, Jacob Israel Avedon, was a Russian-born immigrant who advanced from menial work to starting his own successful retail dress business on Fifth Avenue. His mother, Anna, from a family that owned a dress-manufacturing business, encouraged Richard's love of fashion and art. Avedon's interest in photography emerged when, at age 12, he joined a Young Men's Hebrew Association (YMHA) Camera Club. He would use his family's Kodak Box Brownie not only to feed his curiosity about the world but also to retreat from his personal life. His father was a critical and remote disciplinarian, who insisted that physical strength, education, and money prepared one for life.

As he would come to realize later in life, Avedon's first muse was his younger sister, Louise. In her memoir of their 28 years' working together, Avedon's studio director, Norma Stevens quotes him saying, "Louise was the forerunner—the blueprint, the ghost behind so many of my subjects." During her teen years, Louise struggled through psychiatric treatment, eventually becoming increasingly withdrawn from reality and diagnosed with schizophrenia. These early influences of fashion and family would shape Avedon's life and career, often expressed in his desire to capture tragic beauty in photos.

Avedon attended DeWitt Clinton High School in Bedford Park, Bronx, where from 1937 until 1941 he worked on the school's literary magazine, The Magpie, with James Baldwin. As a teen, he also won a Scholastic Art and Writing Award. In the spring of his senior year, 1941, Avedon was informed that, because he hadn't passed enough of the required courses, he would not be able to graduate and would have to repeat his senior year. After finishing at DeWitt Clinton, he enrolled in a philosophy course at Columbia University's School of General Studies. In 1942, he enlisted in the United States Maritime Service (also known as the Merchant Marines). He was made a staff photographer, using the Rolleiflex camera his father had given him to take ID shots for the crewmen.

== Photography career ==
After his discharge from the Merchant Marines in 1944, Avedon began working as an advertising photographer for a department store, but his real ambition was to join Harper's Bazaar, the world-renowned fashion magazine. After several unsuccessful attempts, he secured a meeting with the magazine's art director, Alexey Brodovitch. Brodovitch and editor-in-chief Carmel Snow reviewed Avedon's portfolio and hired him on the spot. Brodovitch also enrolled him in a photography class he taught at his Design Laboratory at The New School for Social Research. Avedon's work first appeared in the October 1944 issue in the Junior Bazaar section at the back of the magazine, which was aimed at younger readers. His photographs moved to the main editorial section the following month.

In 1946, Avedon set up his own studio and began providing images for magazines such as Vogue and Life. He became the chief photographer for Harper's Bazaar. From 1950, he also contributed photographs to Look and Graphis. In 1952, he became staff editor/photographer for Theatre Arts Magazine. However, towards the end of the 1950s, he became dissatisfied with daylight photography and open-air locations and so turned to studio photography, using strobe lighting.

Diana Vreeland left Harper's Bazaar for Vogue in 1962. Avedon, who admired her, joined her as a staff photographer in 1965. He proceeded to become the lead photographer at Vogue and photographed most of the covers from 1973 until Anna Wintour became editor in chief in late 1988.

Among his fashion advertisement series are the recurring assignments for Gianni Versace, beginning with the spring/summer campaign of 1980. He also photographed the Calvin Klein Jeans campaign featuring a fifteen-year-old Brooke Shields, and directed her in the accompanying television commercials. Avedon first worked with Shields in 1974 for a Colgate toothpaste ad. He photographed her for Versace, 12 American Vogue covers and Revlon's Most Unforgettable Women campaign.

In the February 9, 1981, issue of Newsweek, Avedon said that "Brooke is a lightning rod. She focuses the inarticulate rage people feel about the decline in contemporary morality and destruction of innocence in the world." On working with Avedon, Shields told Interview magazine in May 1992, "When Dick walks into the room, a lot of people are intimidated. But when he works, he's so acutely creative, so sensitive. And he doesn't like it if anyone else is around or speaking. There is a mutual vulnerability, and a moment of fusion when he clicks the shutter. You either get it or you don't".

In addition to his continuing fashion work, by the 1960s, Avedon was making studio portraits of civil rights workers, politicians, and cultural dissidents of various stripes in an America fissured by discord and violence. He branched out into photographing patients of mental hospitals, the Civil Rights Movement in 1963, protesters of the Vietnam War, and later the fall of the Berlin Wall.

A personal book titled Nothing Personal, with a text by his high school classmate James Baldwin, was published in 1964. It includes photographs documenting the civil rights movement, cultural figures, and an extended collection of pictures of people in a mental asylum; together with Baldwin's searing text, it makes a striking commentary on America in 1964.

During this period, Avedon also created two well-known sets of portraits of The Beatles. The first, taken in mid to late 1967, consisted of five psychedelic portraits of the group — four heavily solarized individual color portraits, and a black-and-white group portrait taken with a Rolleiflex camera and a normal Planar lens. The next year, he photographed the much more restrained portraits that were included with The Beatles LP in 1968. Among the many other rock bands photographed by Avedon, in 1973, he shot Electric Light Orchestra with all the members exposing their bellybuttons for recording On the Third Day.

Avedon was always interested in how portraiture captures a subject's personality and soul. As his photographic reputation grew, he began shooting a range of public figures in his studio with a large-format 8×10 view camera. His subjects include Buster Keaton, Marian Anderson, Marilyn Monroe, Ezra Pound, Isak Dinesen, Dwight D. Eisenhower, Andy Warhol, and the Chicago Seven.

By eliminating the use of soft lights and props, Avedon was able to focus on the inner worlds of his subjects evoking emotions and reactions. He would at times evoke reactions from his portrait subjects by guiding them into uncomfortable areas of discussion or asking them psychologically probing questions. Through these means, he would produce images revealing aspects of his subject's character and personality that were not typically captured by others.

Avedon's mural groupings featured emblematic figures: Andy Warhol with the players and stars of The Factory; The Chicago Seven, political radicals charged with conspiracy to incite riot at the 1968 Democratic National Convention; the Beat poet Allen Ginsberg and his extended family; and the Mission Council, a group of military and government officials who governed the United States' participation in the Vietnam War.

In 1982, Avedon produced a series of advertisements for Christian Dior inspired by cinematic imagery and film stills. Featuring director Andre Gregory, photographer Vincent Vallarino, and model/actress Kelly Le Brock, the color photographs purported to show the wild antics of a fictional "Dior family" living ménage à trois while wearing elegant fashions.

Avedon became the first staff photographer for The New Yorker in 1992, where his post-apocalyptic, wild fashion fable “In Memory of the Late Mr. and Mrs. Comfort,” featuring model Nadja Auermann and a skeleton, was published in 1995. Other pictures for the magazine, ranging from the first publication, in 1994, of previously unpublished photos of Marilyn Monroe to a resonant rendering of Christopher Reeve in his wheelchair and nude photographs of Charlize Theron in 2004, were topics of wide discussion.

=== In the American West ===
The cover of Avedon's book In the American West (1985)

Serious heart inflammations hindered Avedon's health in 1974. The troubling time inspired him to create a compelling collection from a new perspective. In 1979, he was commissioned by Mitchell A. Wilder (1913–1979), the director of the Amon Carter Museum in Fort Worth, Texas, to complete the “Western Project.”

Wilder envisioned the project as Avedon's take on the American West. It became a turning point in Avedon's career: Avedon visited and traveled through state fair rodeos, carnivals, coal mines, oil fields, slaughterhouses, and prisons to find subjects, he focused on everyday working-class subjects like miners in soiled work clothes, housewives, farmers, and drifters. This marked a departure from traditional Western photography, which typically emphasized either public figures, models or the landscape's grandeur and openness. The project lasted five years. It allowed Avedon and his crew to photograph 762 people and expose approximately 17,000 sheets of 8×10 Kodak Tri-X Pan film. The collection identified a story within his subjects of their innermost self, a connection Avedon admits would not have happened if his new sense of mortality through severe heart conditions and aging hadn't occurred. The project concluded with both an exhibition and a catalogue. The photographs of the subjects half-figure standing in front of a white cloth including the plate's black frame were printed for the exhibition in an unusually large format.

In 1994, Avedon revisited his subjects who would later speak about the aftermath and direct effects of In the American West. Trucker Billy Mudd spent long periods of time on his own, away from his family. He was a depressed, disconnected, and lonely man before Avedon offered him the chance to be photographed. When he saw his portrait for the first time, Mudd realized that Avedon had revealed something about him, prompting him to recognize the need for change in his life. The portrait transformed Mudd and led him to quit his job and return to his family.

Helen Whitney's 1996 American Masters documentary episode, Avedon: Darkness and Light, depicts an aging Avedon identifying In the American West as his best body of work.

During the production period, Avedon encountered problems with size availability for quality printing paper. While he experimented with platinum printing, he eventually settled on Portriga Rapid, a double-weight, fiber-based gelatin silver paper manufactured by Agfa-Gevaert. Each print required meticulous work, with an average of thirty to forty manipulations. Two exhibition sets of In the American West were printed as artist proofs, one set to remain at the Carter after the exhibition there, and the other, property of the artist, to travel to the subsequent six venues. Overall, the printing took 9 months and consumed about 68,000 square feet (6,300 m^{2}) of paper.

While In the American West is one of Avedon's most notable works, it has often been criticized for falsifying the West through voyeuristic themes and for exploiting his subjects. Avedon's book was actually controversial when it was first released. Some people found it unconventional and unexpected for a book about the West, but it became an iconic image that challenged traditional perceptions of the region. Critics question why a photographer from the East, who traditionally focuses on models or public figures, would go out West to capture working-class people who represent hardship and suffering. They argue that Avedon's intentions are to influence and evoke condescending emotions, such as pity, from the viewer.

== Exhibitions ==
Avedon's work has been the subject of numerous museum exhibitions worldwide. His first major retrospective was held at the Minneapolis Institute of Arts in 1970.

The Metropolitan Museum of Art presented two solo exhibitions during his lifetime: a retrospective in 1978 and Richard Avedon: Portraits in 2002, featuring approximately 180 portraits made throughout his career, including those of Dwight D. Eisenhower, Marian Anderson, Francis Bacon, and Joseph Brodsky. In 1980, the University Art Museum in Berkeley organized a retrospective. Major retrospectives followed at the Whitney Museum of American Art (1994) and the Louisiana Museum of Modern Art in Humlebæk, Denmark (2007), which traveled to Milan, Paris, Berlin, Amsterdam, and San Francisco through 2009.

In 2009, the International Center of Photography mounted the largest survey of Avedon's fashion work, spanning from his earliest photographs in 1944 to portraits from 2000. That same year, the Corcoran Gallery of Art presented Richard Avedon: Portraits of Power, the first exhibition to bring together his political portraits. The exhibition traveled to the San Diego Museum of Art, and was accompanied by a catalog of the same name. ISBN 978-3-86521-675-5

From January to October 2023, the Metropolitan Museum of Art exhibited Richard Avedon: MURALS, featuring group portraits created between 1969 and 1971.

Gagosian Gallery marked the centenary of Avedon's birth with three exhibitions. Avedon 100 (May–July 2023, New York) featured works spanning his career, each selected by prominent visual artists, musicians, and politicians, with an accompanying catalog including essays by Derek Blasberg, Jake Skeets, and Sarah Elizabeth Lewis. ISBN 978-0-847-87386-9 Iconic Avedon: A Centennial Celebration of Richard Avedon (January–March 2024, Paris) included photographs with connections to Paris. Richard Avedon: Italian Days (March–June 2025, Rome) featured photographs shot in Rome, Sicily, and Venice.

== Collections ==
Avedon's work is held in the following permanent collections:

- The Art Institute of Chicago, Chicago, IL
- Museum of Modern Art, New York
- Metropolitan Museum of Art, New York
- Smithsonian's National Museum of American History, Washington, D.C.
- Amon Carter Museum of American Art, Ft. Worth, Texas
- Centre Georges Pompidou, Paris
- Israel Museum, Jerusalem. Supported by Leonard A. Lauder and Larry Gagosian, the Avedon Foundation gave 74 Avedon images to the Israel Museum in 2013.
- Center for Creative Photography, Tucson, Arizona

== Awards ==
- 1989: Lifetime Achievement Award from the Council of Fashion Designers of America
- 1989: Honorary graduate degree from the Royal College of Art
- 1991: Hasselblad Award - https://www.hasselbladfoundation.org/wp/richard-avedon-2/
- 1993: Honorary graduate degree from the Kenyon College
- 1993: International Center of Photography's Master of Photography Award
- 1994: Honorary graduate degree from the Parsons School of Design
- 1994: Prix Nadar in for his book Evidence (1994)
- 2001: Fellow of the American Academy of Arts and Sciences
- 2003: Kitty Carlisle Hart Award, Arts & Business Council, New York
- 2003: Royal Photographic Society 150th Anniversary Medal
- 2003: National Arts Award for Lifetime Achievement
- 2003: The Royal Photographic Society's Special 150th Anniversary Medal and Honorary Fellowship (HonFRPS)
- 2017: International Photography Hall of Fame, St.Louis

== Art market ==
In 2010, a record price of £719,000 was achieved at Christie's for a unique seven-foot-high print of model Dovima, posing in a Christian Dior evening dress with elephants from the Cirque d’Hiver, Paris, in 1955. This particular print, the largest of this image, was made in 1978 for Avedon's fashion retrospective at the Metropolitan Museum of Art in New York, and was bought by Maison Christian Dior.

== Personal life ==
In 1944, Avedon married 19-year-old bank teller Dorcas Marie Nowell, who later became the model and actress Doe Avedon; they did not have children and divorced in 1949. The couple summered at the gay village of Cherry Grove, Fire Island, and Avedon's bisexuality has been attested to by colleagues and family. He was reportedly devastated when Nowell left him.

In 1951, he married Evelyn Franklin; she died on March 13, 2004. Their marriage produced one son, John Avedon, who has written extensively about Tibet.

In 1970, Avedon purchased a former carriage house on the Upper East Side of Manhattan that would serve as both his studio and apartment. In the late 1970s, he purchased a four-bedroom house on a 7.5-acre (3.0 ha) estate in Montauk, New York, between the Atlantic Ocean and a nature preserve; he sold it for almost $9 million in 2000.

According to Norma Stevens, Avedon's longtime studio director, Avedon confided in her about his homosexual relationships, including a decade-long affair with director Mike Nichols.

== Death ==
On October 1, 2004, Avedon died in a San Antonio, Texas, hospital of complications from a cerebral hemorrhage. He was in San Antonio shooting an assignment for The New Yorker. At the time of his death, he was also working on a new project titled Democracy to focus on the run-up to the 2004 U.S. presidential election.

== Legacy ==
The Richard Avedon Foundation is a private operating foundation, structured by Avedon during his lifetime. It began its work shortly after his death in 2004. Based in New York, the foundation is the repository for Avedon's photographs, negatives, publications, papers, and archival materials. In 2006, Avedon's personal collection was shown at the Pace/MacGill Gallery, New York, and at the Fraenkel Gallery, San Francisco, and later sold to benefit the Avedon Foundation. The collection included photographs by Martin Munkacsi, Edward Steichen and Man Ray, among others. A slender volume, Eye of the Beholder: Photographs From the Collection of Richard Avedon (Fraenkel Gallery), assembles the majority of the collection in a boxed set of five booklets: “Diane Arbus,” “Peter Hujar”, “Irving Penn”, “The Countess de Castiglione” and “Etcetera,” which includes 19th- and 20th-century photographers. In 2020, What Becomes a Legend Most: The Biography of Richard Avedon (Harper), written by Philip Gefter, was published. In Dwight Garner's review in The New York Times, he wrote: "One of the achievements of Gefter’s biography is to argue persuasively for Avedon’s place, as a maker of portraits, as one of the 20th century’s most consequential artists.”

In 2026, Ron Howard released a documentary film about his life titled Avedon with interviews including Adam Gopnik, Yolanda Cuomo, Joel Meyerowitz, Samira Nasr, Tina Brown, Larry Gagosian, Penelope Tree, Twyla Tharp, Jane Livingston, Sebastian Kim, John Lahr, Hilton Als, Tyler Mitchell, and Calvin Klein.

== In popular culture ==
Hollywood presented a fictional account of Avedon's early career in the 1957 musical Funny Face, starring Fred Astaire as the fashion photographer "Dick Avery". Avedon supplied some of the still photographs used in the production, including its most noted single image: an intentionally overexposed close-up of Audrey Hepburn's face in which only her noted features – her eyes, her eyebrows, and her mouth – are visible.

Hepburn was Avedon's muse in the 1950s and 1960s, and he went so far as to say: "I am, and forever will be, devastated by the gift of Audrey Hepburn before my camera. I cannot lift her to greater heights. She is already there. I can only record. I cannot interpret her. There is no going further than who she is. She has achieved in herself her ultimate portrait."

In the 1981 film My Dinner with Andre, André Gregory recounts an unusual Halloween gathering he participated in at Montauk, Long Island, on property belonging to Richard Avedon. A small group of people created elaborate, ritual-like experiences for one another, culminating in a mysterious midnight event at the ruins of a burned-down house. André Gregory also credited Avedon with helping cast Jean Lenauer, who plays the restaurant's waiter in the movie.

The 2005 film Capote contains a recreation of Avedon photographing convicted murderers Perry Edward Smith and Richard Hickock in April 1960. Avedon is portrayed by the film's cinematographer, Adam Kimmel.

The 2015 video game Life Is Strange references Avedon several times, with side character Victoria Chase calling him "one of my heroes" in response to being compared to him if the player chooses to be kind to her.

== Noted photographs ==
- Marella Agnelli, Italian socialite, 1953
- Carmen Mayrink Veiga, Brazilian socialite (Vogue's 10 best dressed), 1970
- Dovima with Elephants, 1955
- Marilyn Monroe, actress, 1957
- Homage to Munkacsi, Carmen, coat by Cardin, Paris, 1957
- J. Robert Oppenheimer, physicist, 1958
- Brigitte Bardot, actress, 1959
- Jacqueline de Ribes, 1961
- John F Kennedy, 1960
- Christina Bellin, model, 1962
- The Generals of the Daughters of the American Revolution, 1963
- Kareem Abdul-Jabbar (Lew Alcindor), athlete 1963
- Dwight David Eisenhower, President of the United States, 1964
- The Beatles, 1967
- The Chicago Seven: Lee Weiner, John Froines, Abbie Hoffman, Rennie Davis, Jerry Rubin, Tom Hayden, Dave Dellinger, 1969
- Andy Warhol and Members of the Factory, New York, 1969
- Sly Stone (cover of the album Fresh), 1973
- Asha Puthli, (She Loves to Hear the Music Album back cover), 1974
- Muddy Waters, cover of Hard Again, 1977
- Ronald Fischer, beekeeper, 1981
- Nastassja Kinski and the Serpent, 1981
- Pile of beautiful people, Versace campaign, 1982
- Whitney Houston (cover of Whitney), 1987
- Hikaru Utada (cover of Addicted to You), 1999
- Tom Ford, 2002

== Books ==
- Observations. New York: Simon & Schuster, 1959. Photographs by Avedon, commentary by Truman Capote. Portraits of noted people.
- Nothing Personal. New York: Atheneum: 1964. A collaborative book with James Baldwin.
- Alice in Wonderland: The Forming of a Company and the Making of a Play. Merlin: 1973. By Avedon and Doon Arbus. ISBN 978-0-88306-500-6.
- Portraits. Noonday: 1976. Introduction by Harold Rosenberg. ISBN 978-0-374-51412-9.
- Portraits 1947–1977. Farrar, Straus and Giroux, 1978. ISBN 978-0-374-23200-9.
- In the American West.
  - In the American West, Photographs by Richard Avedon. New York: Abrams, 1985. With an introduction by Laura Wilson. Published in conjunction with an exhibition at Amon Carter Museum, Fort Worth, TX.
  - In the American West, 1979–1984. New York: Abrams, 1985. ISBN 978-0-8109-2301-0.
  - In the American West: 20th Anniversary Edition. New York: Abrams, 2005. ISBN 978-0-8109-5928-6.
- An Autobiography. 1993. Photographs arranged to tell Avedon's life story.
- Evidence. 1994. Essays and text about Avedon with photographs by Avedon.
- The Sixties. 1999. By Avedon and Doon Arbus. Photographs of noted people.
- Made in France, 2001. A retrospective of Avedon's fashion portraiture from the 1950s.
- Richard Avedon Portraits, 2002. Celebrities and subjects from In The American West. Published in conjunction with an exhibition at the Metropolitan Museum of Art.
- Woman in the Mirror. 2005. With an essay by Anne Hollander.
- Performance. 2008. With an essay by John Lahr.
- Portraits of Power. 2008. Edited by Paul Roth. With an essay by Renata Adler. Published in conjunction with an exhibition at the Corcoran Gallery of Art in Washington, D.C.

== See also ==
- Michael Avedon
