= Paper Tiger (2026 film) =

2026 film by James Gray

- American theatrical release poster
- Directed by: James Gray
- Written by: James Gray
- Produced by: James Gray; Rodrigo Teixeira; Anthony Katagas; Raffaella Leone; Andrea Leone; Marco Perego; Leonardo Maria Del Vecchio; Gary Farkas; Carlo Salem; Andrea Bucko
- Starring: Adam Driver; Scarlett Johansson; Miles Teller
- Cinematography: Joaquín Baca-Asay
- Edited by: Scott Morris
- Music by: Christopher Spelman
- Production companies: RT Features; Keep Your Head Productions; Vice Pictures; Lotus; Leone Film Group Company; Vixens; Jury Rigged Pictures
- Distributed by: Neon (United States); Diamond Films (Brazil); 01 Distribution (Italy)
- Release dates: May 16, 2026 (Cannes); November 13, 2026 (United States); January 7, 2027 (Brazil); February 4, 2027 (Italy)
- Running time: 114 minutes
- Countries: United States; Brazil; Italy
- Language: English
- Budget: $15 million
- Box office: $622,329

Paper Tiger is a 2026 crime drama film written and directed by James Gray. A co-production between the United States, Brazil, and Italy, it stars Adam Driver, Scarlett Johansson, and Miles Teller, and follows a New York family that becomes entangled with the Russian mob.

The film had its world premiere in the main competition of the 2026 Cannes Film Festival on May 16, where it competed for the Palme d'Or. It was given a limited theatrical release in the United States by Neon on November 13, with a nationwide expansion to follow a week later. It received positive reviews from critics.

== Plot ==
In 1986, Irwin Pearl, an engineer raising a family in Queens, is approached by his brother Gary, a former NYPD officer, with a business proposition. Both face financial difficulties; Irwin's family is on a tight budget and aspires to send their two teenage sons to Ivy League universities, while Gary is in the middle of an expensive divorce. Since leaving the force, Gary has parlayed his law enforcement experience and wide-ranging political connections into a security and consulting business. He proposes to partner his relationships with Irwin's engineering expertise to consult for Russian immigrant businesses at the docks who are struggling to comply with environmental regulations.

Irwin and Gary have an initially productive meeting with a prospective client. Irwin decides to visit the premises again at night, bringing his sons along to show them his work. He stumbles upon preparations for illegal dumping, and the Russians steal his car and threaten him and his sons. Gary arranges for him and Irwin to meet with Simeon Bogoyavich, a Russian mafia boss who owns the business at the docks and expresses concern that Irwin will contact the police about what he saw. Bogoyavich wants access to Gary's political network and says he will leave Irwin alone if Gary agrees to work for him; Gary, who unlike many of his NYPD colleagues never took bribes, insists that Bogoyavich instead accept a payoff to settle the matter.

Days later, Bogoyavich's men break into Irwin's family's home in the middle of the night, rearranging the furniture and leaving behind photos of the family sleeping. Gary visits the men the next day and beats them up as retribution. Irwin's wife Hester is diagnosed with glioblastoma and given a prognosis of six months to a year to live. Feeling that Irwin and Gary are unable to handle the situation, she reports the matter to the FBI, news which makes its way back to Bogoyavich.

Bogoyavich demands that Gary figure out who contacted the FBI. Realizing that it was either Irwin or Hester, he lies and tells Bogoyavich it was a false report. Bogoyavich tells him that he never saw Irwin as a real threat, and threatened him only to pressure Gary to work for him. With Gary still defiant, Bogoyavich sends his men to kill him. After giving Scott his birthday present and the keys of his car, Gary lures them to a field of tall grass, killing two of Bogoyavich's men before he is shot and killed himself. Meanwhile, Hester prepares to leave for the hospital, aided by her mother, and kisses her sons goodbye as they sleep. In the morning, Irwin expresses his love for his sons to them and reflects.

== Cast ==
- Adam Driver as Gary Pearl, a former police officer, Irwin's older brother, and Scott and Ben's uncle
- Scarlett Johansson as Hester Pearl, Irwin's wife and Scott and Ben's mother
- Miles Teller as Irwin Pearl, an engineer, Gary's younger brother, Hester's husband, and Scott and Ben's father
- Gavin Goudey as Scott Pearl, Irwin and Hester's college-bound eighteen-year-old son, Gary’s nephew and Ben’s brother
- Roman Engel as Ben Pearl, Irwin and Hester's younger son, Gary’s nephew and Scott’s brother
- Victor Ptak as Simeon Bogoyavich, a fearsome Russian mob boss of whom Gary and Irwin run afoul
- Cindy Katz as Iris Belfer
- Yavor Vesselinov as Alexei Yunov
- Joel Marsh Garland as Lt. Stan Durkheim

== Production ==
=== Development ===
In October 2022, while promoting Armageddon Time, James Gray said he was interested in making a follow-up film that would be about the mother character, portrayed by Anne Hathaway. "The story goes in a very unexpected place because my father actually did achieve some financial success but wound up getting it all confiscated by the government when he got into legal trouble. At the same time, my mother found out she was dying. And so, it's going to be, I think, something about that period," he added.

At the 2024 Deauville American Film Festival, Gray teased to France Inter that he was in the process of crafting an original piece of material that "will be about my family, but not from my perspective, maybe from my parents' perspective," and be set 5 to 10 years after the events of Armageddon Time. Gray added that the project, while personal, would also have elements of a crime drama. In November 2024, it was reported that Gray had set the project, titled Paper Tiger, as his next film, with a cast led by Adam Driver, Anne Hathaway and Jeremy Strong. Raffaella Leone was to produce for Leone Film Group alongside Rodrigo Teixeira for RT Features. By May 2025, Hathaway and Strong had dropped out of the film due to other commitments, being replaced by Scarlett Johansson and Miles Teller, respectively. The film was backed by Vixens, a Paris-based production banner. In May 2026, Gray confirmed the film had a $15 million budget.

=== Filming ===
Principal photography began in early June 2025 in Denville Township, New Jersey. It was previously scheduled to begin in New Jersey in April 2025.

American cinematographer Joaquin Baca-Asay shot the film on 35mm, marking his third collaboration with Gray, following We Own the Night (2007) and Two Lovers (2008).

== Release ==
In April 2026, SND acquired French distribution rights. Later that month, Neon acquired North American rights.

The film had its world premiere in competition for the Palme d'Or at the 2026 Cannes Film Festival on May 16, where it received a 10-minute standing ovation. It was also selected as the opening film of the 2026 New York Film Festival. It is scheduled to be released in select theaters in the United States on November 13, 2026, before expanding to a wide release on November 20. Diamond Films will release the film in Brazil on January 7, 2027, before an Italian release from 01 Distribution on February 4.

== Reception ==
=== Critical response ===
On the review aggregator website Rotten Tomatoes, 87% of 139 critics' reviews are positive, with an average rating of 7.2/10. Metacritic, which uses a weighted average, assigned the film a score of 81 out of 100, based on 38 critics, indicating "universal acclaim".

Paper Tiger was received with critical acclaim, with Tomris Laffly of Elle naming it a "new American classic" and Rodrigo Perez of The Playlist calling it "authentic, poignant, and quietly devastating". Stephanie Zacharek of Time commended the film as "old school in the best way" and singled out Scarlett Johansson's performance as "superb". David Ehrlich of IndieWire graded it "A" and named it "a remarkably knowing and perceptive film about how family is, and has always been, the ultimate devil’s bargain", also praising Gray's script and the acting, specially Adam Driver's work, which he considers "a career-best performance that stretches across flash, menace, and pure sincerity". David Rooney of The Hollywood Reporter wrote "Gray and his superb cast are in blazing form and full command here in a bruising movie that reveals the heavy price of pursuing the American Dream too recklessly", also adding that "Johansson has never been better". Owen Gleiberman of Variety billed the film as a "mouthy, close-knit Jewish domestic psychodrama", assessing that Gray's direction cannot avoid turning it into a "mixture of the grandiose and the implausible". Peter Bradshaw of The Guardian gave it four out of five stars, calling the film "a really substantial piece of work from Gray." Brian Tallerico of RogerEbert.com gave the film four out of four stars, writing, "while the film is consistently entertaining, with a low hum of tension from nearly its opening scenes, it has a bleakness that isn't entirely apparent until it's over."

=== Accolades ===
Award	Date of ceremony	Category	Recipient(s)	Result	Ref.
Cannes Film Festival	May 23, 2026	Palme d'Or	James Gray	Nominated	
Locarno Film Festival	August 15, 2026	Prix du public UBS	James Gray	Nominated	
Pingyao International Film Festival	September 24, 2026	People's Choice Award - Gala Best Film	James Gray	Nominated	
Mill Valley Film Festival	October 1, 2026	Maverick Director Award	James Gray	Won	
Celebración of Cinema and Television	October 2, 2026	Producer Award	Rodrigo Teixeira	Won	
Virginia Film Festival	October 21, 2026	Achievement in Directing Award	James Gray	Won	
Gijón International Film Festival	November 21, 2026	Albar - Best Film	James Gray	Pending	
Gotham Independent Film Awards	November 30, 2026	Best Feature	James Gray, Andrea Bucko, Leonardo Maria del Vecchio, Gary Farkas, James Gray, Anthony Katagas, Andrea Leone, Raffaella Leone, Marco Perego, Carlo Salem, Rodrigo Teixeira	Pending	
Gotham Independent Film Awards	November 30, 2026	Outstanding Supporting Performance	Adam Driver	Pending	
