= Making Marie Antoinette =

2026 American documentary film

- Theatrical release poster
- Directed by: Eleanor Coppola
- Produced by: Lorenzo Mieli; Mario Gianani; Rachel Dengiz; Youree Henley; Sofia Coppola
- Edited by: Aaron Matthews
- Music by: Aaron Maine
- Production companies: Our Films; Mediawan; Entourage Pictures
- Distributed by: Mubi
- Release dates: September 5, 2026 (Telluride); October 23, 2026 (United States)
- Running time: 87 minutes
- Countries: United States; Italy
- Language: English

Making Marie Antoinette is a 2026 documentary film directed by Eleanor Coppola. A co-production between the United States and Italy, it follows the production of Marie Antoinette (2006) directed by her daughter Sofia Coppola. Following Eleanor's death in 2024, the film was finished by Sofia, who serves as a producer.

The film had its world premiere at the 53rd Telluride Film Festival on September 5, 2026, and was released in the United States by Mubi on October 23. It received widespread praise from critics.

== Premise ==
Eleanor Coppola documents the production of Marie Antoinette directed by her daughter, Sofia Coppola. Diane Lane voices Eleanor's journals.

== Production ==
During the COVID-19 pandemic, Sofia Coppola and Eleanor Coppola revisited 80 hours of footage shot by Eleanor during the production of Marie Antoinette, with the intention of editing it into a feature-length film.

== Release ==
The film premiered at the 53rd Telluride Film Festival on September 5, 2026. It screened at the 2026 New York Film Festival in the Spotlight section on September 29.

In July 2026, Mubi acquired worldwide distribution rights to the film. It was released in the United States on October 23.

== Reception ==
On the review aggregator website Rotten Tomatoes, 100% of 40 critics' reviews are positive, with an average rating of 8.0/10. The website's consensus reads: "With its evocative memories and graceful narration, Making Marie Antoinette unfolds as a tender celebration of artistry and the bond between mother and daughter." Metacritic, which uses a weighted average, assigned the film a score of 81 out of 100, based on 13 critics, indicating "universal acclaim".

== See also ==
- Hearts of Darkness: A Filmmaker's Apocalypse (1991)
