= Elizabeth Moynihan =

American historian and writer (1929–2023)

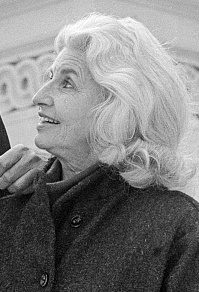
Elizabeth Moynihan

Elizabeth Therese Brennan Moynihan (September 19, 1929 – November 7, 2023) was an American historian and writer.

== Biography ==
Born in Norfolk County, Massachusetts in 1929, to Therese Russell Brennan, a newspaper editor, and Francis Brennan, a chemical factory foreman, her early life was marked by economic hardship during the Great Depression.

Moynihan attended Boston College but could not complete her degree due to financial difficulties. She began her career in politics, volunteering in John F. Kennedy's 1952 Senate campaign and Adlai Stevenson's presidential campaign. She later moved to New York, working in Governor W. Averell Harriman's 1954 campaign, where she met her future husband, Pat Moynihan.

Her involvement in her husband's political career was notable, particularly in strategizing against his electoral challengers. During her husband's ambassadorship to India in the 1970s, Moynihan developed an interest in Mughal history. She is credited with the discovery of a lost garden built by Emperor Babur, a find acknowledged by The Times as significant in the field of archaeology.

Moynihan authored Paradise as a Garden: In Persia and Mughal India (1979), and edited The Moonlight Garden: New Discoveries at the Taj Mahal (2000), detailing the rediscovery and restoration of the Mehtab Bagh. The project involved collaboration with Indian scholars and contributed to the preservation of historical sites.

Moynihan was also a founding trustee of the Leon Levy Foundation in New York, advocating for the preservation of historical sites. Her work in Mughal studies and preservation efforts are recognized as significant contributions to the field.

== Bibliography ==
- Paradise as a Garden: In Persia and Mughal India (1979)
