= Avedon (film) =

- Release poster
- Directed by: Ron Howard
- Produced by: Sara Bernstein; Brian Grazer; Ron Howard; Dallas Brennan Rexer; Christopher St. John; Justin Wilkes
- Cinematography: Robert Chappell
- Edited by: Andrew Morreale
- Music by: David Fleming
- Distributed by: Netflix
- Release dates: May 17, 2026 (Cannes); November 11, 2026 (Netflix)
- Running time: 104 minutes
- Country: United States
- Language: English

Avedon is a 2026 American documentary film directed by Ron Howard, about the life and work of American photographer Richard Avedon.

The film had its world premiere in the Special Screenings section of the 2026 Cannes Film Festival on May 17, where it competed for the L'Œil d'or. It had its North American premiere at the 53rd Telluride Film Festival.

Among those interviewed during the course of the film are Richard Avedon's son John Avedon, fashion designer Calvin Klein, photographer Joel Meyerowitz, art gallerist Larry Gagosian, actress Isabella Rossellini, writer Hilton Als, magazine editor Tina Brown, and models Beverly Johnson and Twiggy.

== Release ==
The film was released on Netflix on November 11, 2026.

== Reception ==
On the review aggregator website Rotten Tomatoes, 100% of 16 critics' reviews are positive, with an average rating of 7.8/10. Metacritic, which uses a weighted average, assigned the film a score of 82 out of 100, based on 10 critics, indicating "universal acclaim".

Christian Zilko of IndieWire gave the film a B+, writing, "As Howard and editor Andrew Morreale flip through [Avedon's] seemingly endless body of work, the cinematic quality of his images are placed on full display. The film strikes an elegant balance between providing context for his innovations and letting the work do the talking, resulting in one of the more entertaining art documentaries that this critic has ever seen."
