= Carl Sagan: We Are Made of Star Stuff =

- Directed by: Nanette Burstein
- Produced by: Nanette Burstein; Ann Druyan; Erica Huggins; Seth MacFarlane; Timothy Moran
- Cinematography: Adam Beckman
- Edited by: Tal Ben-David
- Release date: September 6, 2026 (Telluride)
- Running time: 98 minutes
- Country: United States
- Language: English

Carl Sagan: We Are Made of Star Stuff is a 2026 American documentary film which explores the life and work of Carl Sagan. It was directed by Nanette Burstein.

It premiered at the 53rd Telluride Film Festival.
