= Michael Avedon =

American photographer (born 1991)

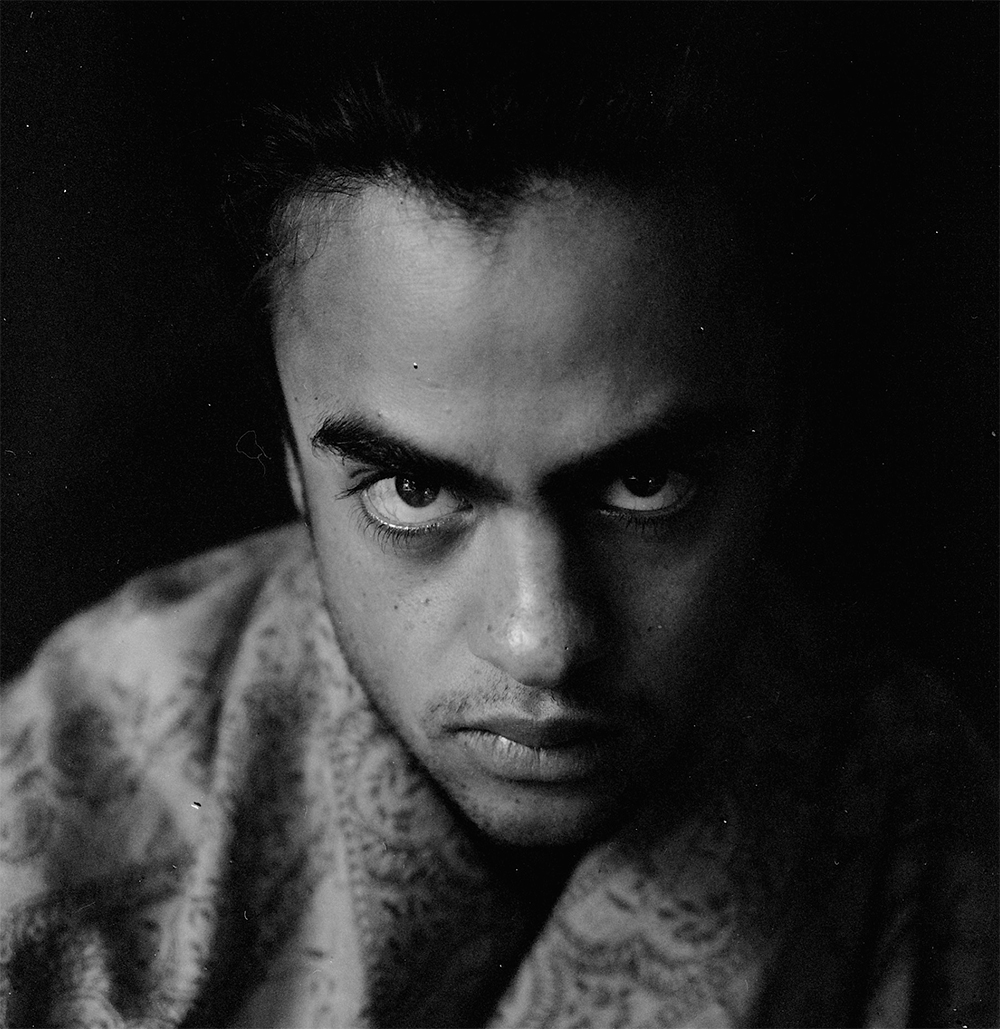
- Born: January 16, 1991 (age 35); New York City, New York, US
- Education: International Center of Photography
- Occupation: Photographer
- Relatives: Richard Avedon (paternal grandfather); Daniel Patrick Moynihan (maternal grandfather)
- Website: michaelavedon.com

Michael Patrick Avedon (born January 16, 1991) is an American photographer living in New York City. Avedon works commercially as a fashion photographer and makes portraits for his personal work – including an ongoing series of artists in their studios.

Avedon began experimenting with photography in 2006, and in 2012 was named in Forbes's "30 Under 30" list of up-and-coming artists. In the spring of 2013 he graduated from the International Center of Photography. He has worked for Louis Vuitton, Calvin Klein, Harper's Bazaar, CR Fashion Book, and Dazed.

He is the grandson of Richard Avedon on his father's side, and Senator Daniel Patrick Moynihan on his mother's side.

== Early life ==
Michael Patrick Avedon was born in New York City to Maura Moynihan and John Avedon. From a young age, he was influenced by and participated in counter-culture movements such as skateboarding, surfing, and punk rock music. He attended York Preparatory School on the Upper West Side from 7th through 12th grade. After graduating from high school, Avedon spent two years studying at the School of Visual Arts in downtown Manhattan. Subsequently, he transferred to the International Center of Photography, where he studied for an additional two years, graduating in the spring of 2013.

== Work ==
Avedon has shot advertisements for Louis Vuitton and Calvin Klein, and fashion editorials for Harper's Bazaar, CR Fashion Book, Dazed & Confused, VMAN, Interview Russia, Out of Order, and HERO.

In March 2012, Avedon had his first fashion spread in V Man, a fashion magazine edited by Stephen Gan. His first notable commercial assignment was a series of behind the scenes photographs at the 2012 haute couture Paris Fashion Week, commissioned by Carine Roitfeld's CR Fashion Book. Avedon was subsequently asked to shoot for the magazine's debut issue (September 2012), as well as several following issues. He maintains an ongoing working relationship with Roitfeld, and returned to Paris Fashion Week in 2013 to shoot for her magazine. Throughout 2012 and 2013 Avedon has worked closely with Jefferson Hack (founder of Dazed & Confused, Another Magazine and NOWNESS), and has shot several notable celebrities for Dazed & Confused, including Greta Gerwig, Nicolas Jaar, and Damien Echols, as well as a Brooke Shields cover story for Under the Influence, and Naomi Campbell for Interview Russia.

In July 2014 Avedon shot Lottie Moss (the younger half-sister of Kate Moss) for Calvin Klein. The shoot took place in London and featured a '90s-inspired Calvin Klein Jeans capsule collection. In ways the shoot pays homage to the iconic 1980's advertisement shot and directed by Richard Avedon for Calvin Klein, featuring model Brooke Shields. In August 2014 Avedon shot Emma Ferrer (the granddaughter of Audrey Hepburn) for Harper's Bazaar. The shoot took place in Florence, where Ferrer has lived for the past six years. The concept, envisioned by Bazaar's editor-in-chief Glenda Bailey, was to create a tribute to the many popular photographs that Richard Avedon shot of Hepburn throughout the late 1950s and early 1960s. Both the clothing and poses were largely inspired by these past works. Joanna Hillman was the fashion editor on the shoot.

The October 29 – November 11, 2018 issue of New York magazine included a portfolio of Avedon's portraits of 25 survivors of school shootings, from a 1946 shooting at the Brooklyn High School For Automotive Trades to the Stoneman Douglas High School shooting.

=== Personal work ===
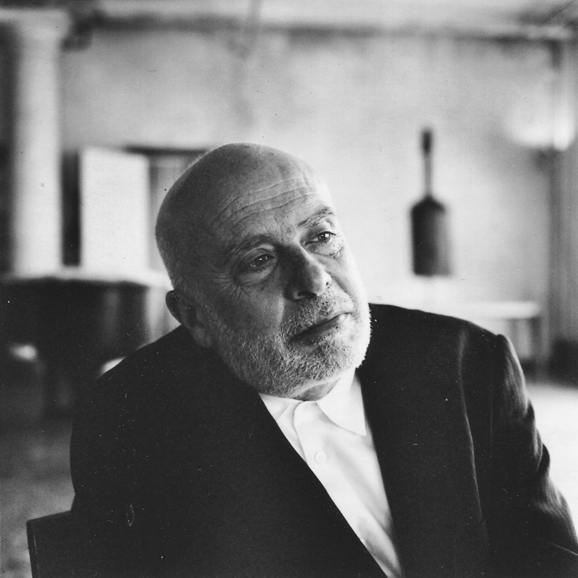
Portrait of Francesco Clemente in his studio (2011).

Avedon's personal work has predominantly taken the form of portrait photography. Influenced by the extensive legacy of his grandfather's work, he has shot primarily in black & white, using 35mm and medium format film. His ongoing portrait project of artists have been intimate, close-up sittings, typically conducted in the artist's studio. Artists he has photographed for the project thus far include: Chuck Close, Richard Serra, Francesco Clemente, Peter Beard, Julian Schnabel, and Terence Koh. His maternal grandmother Elizabeth Moynihan has also been a recurring subject in his personal work. Avedon describes his work as "a mix of movement and energy".
