= John A. Scali =

American diplomat

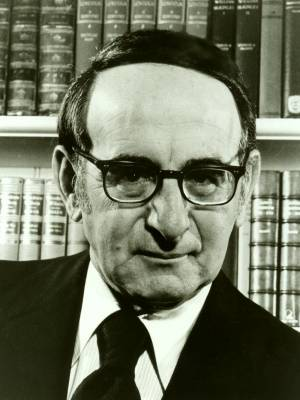

11th United States Ambassador to the United Nations
- In office February 20, 1973 – June 29, 1975
- President: Richard Nixon; Gerald Ford
- Preceded by: George H. W. Bush
- Succeeded by: Daniel Patrick Moynihan

Personal details
- Born: John Alfred Scali; April 27, 1918 Canton, Ohio, U.S.
- Died: October 9, 1995 (aged 77) Washington, D.C., U.S.
- Spouse(s): Helen Glock (1946–1973); Denise St. Germain (1973–1995)
- Education: Boston University (BA)

John Alfred Scali (April 27, 1918 – October 9, 1995) was the United States Ambassador to the United Nations from 1973 to 1975. From 1961 he was also a long time correspondent for ABC News.

As a correspondent for ABC, Scali became an intermediary during the Cuban Missile Crisis and later a part of the Nixon Administration. Scali gained fame after it became known in 1964 that in October 1962, a year after he joined ABC News, he had carried a critical message from KGB Colonel Aleksandr Fomin (the cover name for Alexander Feklisov) to U.S. officials. He left ABC in 1971 to serve as a foreign affairs adviser to President Nixon, becoming U.S. Ambassador to the United Nations in 1973. Scali re-joined ABC in 1975 where he worked until retiring in 1993.

Scali was contacted by Soviet embassy official (and KGB Station Chief) Fomin about a proposed settlement to the crisis, and subsequently he acted as a contact between Fomin and President Kennedy and the Executive Committee. However, it was without government direction that Scali responded to new Soviet conditions with a warning that a U.S. invasion was only hours away, prompting the Soviets to settle the crisis quickly.

Diplomatic posts
Preceded by George H. W. Bush	United States Ambassador to the United Nations; 1973–1975	Succeeded by Daniel Patrick Moynihan
