= Andrea Bucko =

American film producer

- Andrea Bucko at the 2026 New York Film Festival
- Occupation: Film producer

Andrea Bucko is an American film producer. Her producing credits include Longlegs, Oh, Canada, Dead Man's Wire, Bucking Fastard and Paper Tiger.

She co-founded the production companies Sweetheart Entertainment with producer Nicholas Weinstock and Yume Entertainment with producer Motoko Kimura.

Bucko was nominated for Best Feature at the 2026 Gotham Film Awards as one of the producers of Paper Tiger.

== Career ==
Bucko's producing credits include Longlegs and Oh, Canada. Through her producing banner Sugar Rush Pictures, she was also a producer on Alpha Gang, starring Cate Blanchett; and Dead Man's Wire, starring Bill Skarsgård.

In December 2025, Bucko and Japanese producer Motoko Kimura launched Yume Entertainment, a film and television production and finance company intended to connect the Hollywood and Asian film industries.

In January 2026, Bucko was announced as a producer on Vegas: A Love Story, a romantic thriller directed by Ramin Bahrani and starring Maika Monroe, Brandon Sklenar, Paul Dano, Michael Shannon and Judy Greer. In the same year, she was also announced as a producer of Iron Jane, a female bodybuilding drama written and directed by Lissette Feliciano and starring Eiza González and Brandon Sklenar.

In May 2026, Bucko partnered with producer Nicky Weinstock to launch Sweetheart Entertainment, a production company focused on film and television development and production financing. At its launch, Bucko was a producer on James Gray's Paper Tiger, which was selected for competition at the Cannes Film Festival and acquired by Neon. In June, it was announced Sweetheart Entertainment signed a first-look deal with Prologue Entertainment. Under the agreement, Bucko and Weinstock will develop and produce television series based on real-life characters and events for Prologue's scripted slate.

In September 2026, Bucko was among the producers of Bucking Fastard, a film directed by Werner Herzog that premiered at the 2026 Venice Film Festival.

== Selected filmography ==
| Year | Title | Role |
|---|---|---|
| 2021 | On Our Way | Producer |
| 2023 | Freud's Last Session | Executive producer |
| 2024 | Oh, Canada | Executive producer |
| 2024 | Longlegs | Executive producer |
| 2024 | Goodrich | Executive producer |
| 2025 | Tin Soldier | Executive producer |
| 2025 | Dead Man's Wire | Producer |
| 2025 | Not Without Hope | Executive producer |
| 2025 | Stone Cold Fox | Executive producer |
| 2026 | In the Grey | Co-executive producer |
| 2026 | Paper Tiger | Producer |
| 2026 | Bucking Fastard | Producer |
| 2026 | Alpha Gang | Producer |
