= Bucking Fastard =

2026 drama film by Werner Herzog

- Directed by: Werner Herzog
- Written by: Werner Herzog
- Produced by: Clara Wu Tsai; Ariel Leon Isacovitch; Agnes Chu; Kieran Corrigan; Emanuele Moretti; Andrea Bucko; Nick N Raslan
- Starring: Kate Mara; Rooney Mara; Orlando Bloom; Domhnall Gleeson
- Cinematography: Peter Zeitlinger
- Edited by: Marco Capalbo
- Music by: Ernst Reijseger
- Production companies: Providence Road Entertainment; HanWay Films; Gateway to Orkney
- Release date: 3 September 2026 (Venice)
- Running time: 109 minutes
- Countries: Ireland; United States
- Language: English

Bucking Fastard is a 2026 drama film written and directed by Werner Herzog, and loosely based on the lives of Freda and Greta Chaplin. It stars Kate and Rooney Mara as the twin sisters Jean and Joan Holbrooke, alongside Orlando Bloom and Domhnall Gleeson in supporting roles.

The film had its world premiere in the main competition of the 83rd Venice International Film Festival on 3 September 2026, where it competed for the Golden Lion.

== Plot ==
Twin sisters Jean and Joan Holbrooke live an isolated life in an Irish suburb. Their bond is so strong they speak in constant unison and cannot accomplish everyday tasks without difficulty, as they attempt to do them simultaneously. One day they become deeply infatuated with their next door neighbor, a boozing limousine driver named Gareth Mulroney. Gareth is delighted by the passionate threesomes he has with the sisters but is preparing to marry a woman named Gladys. The sisters believe their bond with Gareth is eternal and, child-like, that he is in deep love with them. When he spurns their proposals of being forever together, they resort to increasing acts of vandalism in order to win him back. Eventually, Gareth seeks a restraining order against them. The resulting trial causes national attention in the Irish tabloids.

Jean and Joan continue their campaign of harassment. A kindly neighbor, a widower named Richard Westmoreland, catches them and offers them a new home in his unused apartment in Dublin as a means of retreat from Gareth. There, they find themselves troubled by city life. People come up to them in the street asking for selfies. They are harassed by the building’s lecherous landlord Mr. Evans and by his employee Brendan, a slow-witted forklift driver. Richard arrives to inform them photographs of them naked have been published online, and the sisters suspect Brendan has been spying on them from the opposite roof. An attempt to stop him ends up injuring Mr. Evans instead, the actual culprit. Brendan nevertheless assaults them by cutting off a piece of Joan’s hair, which causes the sisters to no longer be identical, much to their distress. A social worker named Timothy periodically stops by to help teach them how to live more independently, with limited success. One lesson involves a train journey to visit their parents, who, embarrassed, reject them without a word.

The only relative who shows any interest is their Aunt Louise, who invites them to stay on her idyllic farm in the Irish countryside. There, Jean and Joan meet an aging shepherd named MacFarlane, who shows them a local cave with a tunnel a local madman started excavating two hundred years ago, attempting to dig to the Orkney Islands. The sisters encounter a bullying public health official who poisons all of the local foxes under the guise of stopping a rabies epidemic. MacFarlane and Aunt Louise help them rescue the sole surviving fox, who they name Cupid.

Growing obsessed with the tunnel legend, and the idea of the Orkney Islands as a mythical place where their desire for love can be fulfilled, the sisters spend two years continuing the tunnel’s excavation. One day, after the digging becomes so frustrating that Jean slips out of sync with Joan, Cupid disappears into a small hole. Following him, the sisters discover a vast elaborate tourist cave with lights, iron railings, a narrow gage railroad, and impressive stalactite formations. Believing this to be part of their mythical land, they wander and see a tourist guide who resembles Gareth and who smiles at them. They bury their clothes on Aunt Louise’s farm, don their wedding dresses, and head back into the cave to joyfully marry the guide. Attempting to find him in their mythical land, the tourist attraction’s security guard abruptly stops them from leaving by the front entrance, trapping them inside the cave.

== Cast ==
- Kate Mara as Jean Holbrooke
- Rooney Mara as Joan Holbrooke
- Orlando Bloom as Gareth Mulroney / Cave Train Conductor
- Domhnall Gleeson as Timothy
- Hugh O'Conor as Counsel
- Simon Delaney as Judge
- Rúaidhrí Conroy as Fireman
- John Kavanagh as Richard Westmoreland
- Malcolm Adams as Mr. Evans
- John Connors as Brendan the Forklift Driver
- Marion O'Dwyer as Auntie Louise
- Brendan Conroy as MacFarlane
- Ian Toner as Public Health Official

== Production ==
Referring to unrealized projects in his 1991 series Filmstunde and again in his 2022 memoir Every Man for Himself and God Against All, Werner Herzog mentioned a concept called Bucking Fastard about British identical twin sisters Freda and Greta Chaplin, who gained notoriety in the 1980s for having a restraining order put on them by a man they both became involved with. The title refers to a synchronized verbal slip the sisters made in court.

In February 2025, it was announced that Herzog would make a film with that name based on a true story about twins Joan and Jean, with sisters Kate and Rooney Mara to star in their first project together. Of working with her sister for the first time, Kate said: "We've been looking for something to do together for a while. The first hurdle was finding a filmmaker that we both like, and while we like a lot of the same things, we both had an equal excitement about working with Werner. We're playing total equals who speak in unison and do everything the same. They dream the same in the film, and they're so in sync. We could have never imagined finding two roles in a film where we're literally equals in so many ways, and it was just so perfect."

Principal photography took place in Ireland at Dublin's Pigeon House film studios and in and around the town of Naas, County Kildare; the Mara sisters were spotted during shooting on Dublin's Capel Street in early April. Additional scenes were filmed in Slovenia. Filming wrapped by the end of the month, with Orlando Bloom and Domhnall Gleeson also cast. Herzog reunited with various collaborators, including cinematographer Peter Zeitlinger, editor Marco Capalbo, and composer Ernst Reijseger.

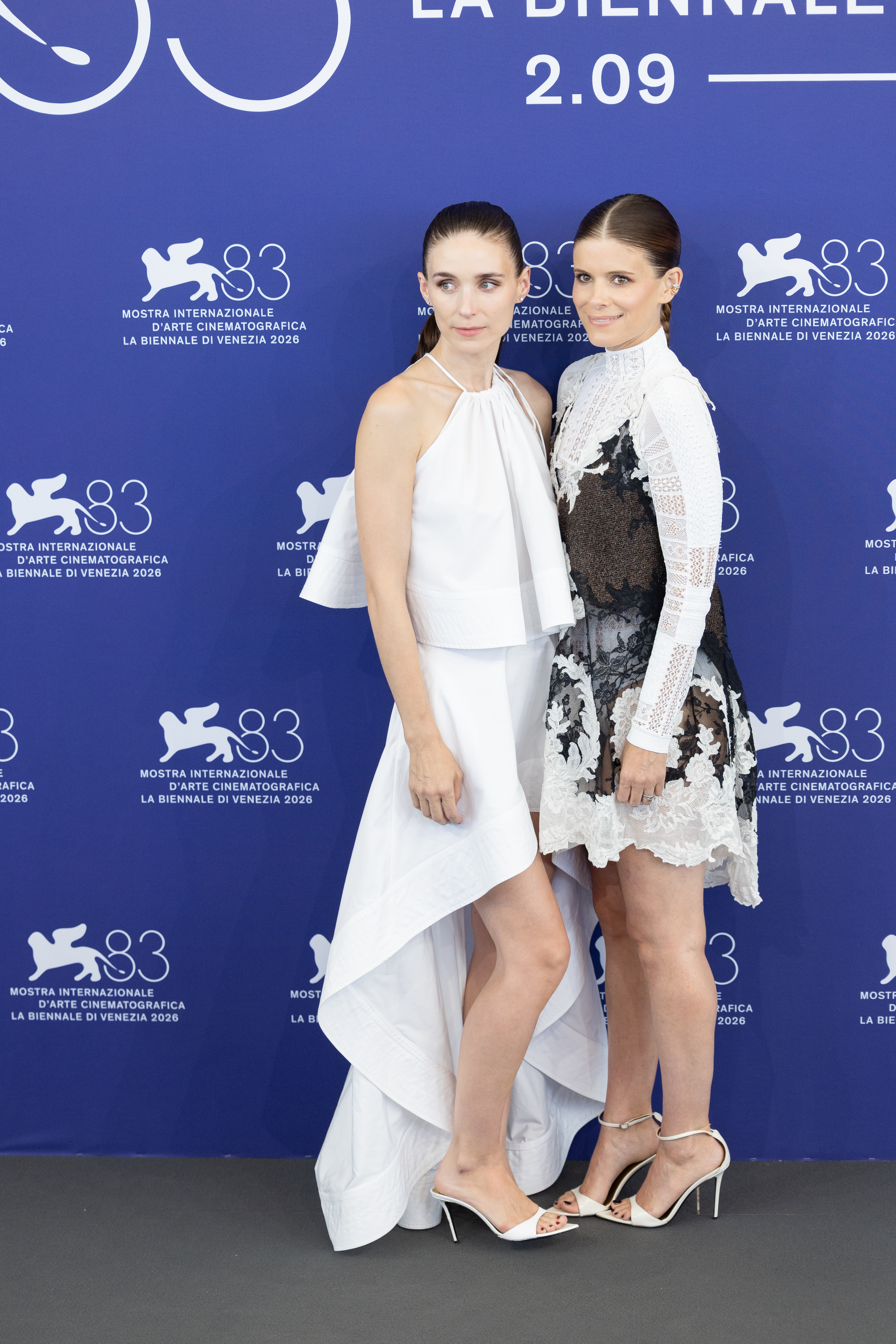
Kate Mara and Rooney Mara at 83rd Venice International Film Festival

== Release ==
In May 2026, Variety reported that the film was offered a world premiere at the 2026 Cannes Film Festival in the non-competitive official selection lineup, but this proposal was rejected because the film was not offered a competition slot.

It had its world premiere in the main competition of the 83rd Venice International Film Festival on 3 September 2026, and its North American premiere at the 53rd Telluride Film Festival. It was also selected for the 2026 Toronto International Film Festival and the Spotlight section of the 2026 New York Film Festival.

== Reception ==
On the review aggregator website Rotten Tomatoes, 69% of 59 critics' reviews are positive, with an average rating of 6.1/10. Metacritic, which uses a weighted average, assigned the film a score of 60 out of 100, based on 25 critics, indicating "mixed or average reviews".

Peter Bradshaw of The Guardian rated the film 2 out of 5 stars, writing that it "systematically wastes the audience's time, as well as the talents of its formidable female leads".

Jessica Kiang of Variety called the film "occasionally sublime, often ridiculous and always extravagantly weird".

Ryan Lattanzio of IndieWire gave the film a 'B+', writing that the "wryly funny, touchingly eccentric, and uncompromisingly batshit feature" would "enchant and dismay in likely equivalent proportions".
