= Wafa Mustafa =

Syrian journalist and activist

- Citizenship: Syria
- Education: Bard College Berlin
- Occupation: Journalist
- Website: Twitter; Instagram

Wafa Mustafa (b. 1989 or 1990 (age 36–37)) is a Syrian journalist and activist who campaigns for the release of Syrian detainees. As an activist and former member of Families for Freedom, Mustafa has extensively lobbied the United Nations Security Council to call for the release of the names and locations of all those that Syrian authorities have in captivity. She calls for all detainees in Syria to be freed, whether they are held by the Assad regime or by opposition groups, though she also supports the public demonstrations that began in 2011 against the government of Bashar al-Assad.

Mustafa also campaigns for international recognition of Syrian refugees and against normalized international relations with the Assad regime.

== Early life ==
Mustafa was born in Masyaf and is the eldest of three daughters. Mustafa's family was politically active and liberal, and her father took Wafa to demonstrations in Damascus in support of Palestine starting at age 10. Mustafa protested in front of the Libyan embassy at the beginning of the First Libyan Civil War, and when Syrian authorities attacked protesters and the Syrian civil war began, she became involved in protests.

== Personal life ==
In July 2013, Mustafa was diagnosed with chronic anxiety and depression. That year, after the death of a close friend, she kept herself in her house for three months, barely ever leaving her room except to use the bathroom, which led to severe weight loss. It was her father who finally convinced her to seek medical treatment.

Mustafa, her mother, and her sister fled Syria in the week after her father Ali was arrested in July 2013, fearing they too would be arrested. They lived in Turkey for 3 years, facing poverty, as they had taken only their passports. Wafa now lives in Berlin, and she graduated from Bard College Berlin in 2020 with a degree in humanities and arts.

Mustafa stated that she still considered Syria to be her home, and planned to return if the Assad regime ever fell. In December 2024, weeks after the fall of the regime, she successfully returned to Damascus to commence her twelve year long search for her father.

== Activism ==
=== Disappearance of Ali Mustafa ===
Mustafa cites as motivation for her activism the disappearance of her father, Ali Mustafa, a human rights activist, who was seen for the last time on 2 July 2013. That day, Wafa recounts witnesses saying that a group of men attacked her family home, where she had been living for two months since the death of a close friend in a rocket attack.

Ali had been harassed as early as 2011 by State Security, and had been arrested multiple times before and after the revolution, including once with his colleague Hussam al-Dhafri by armed men in civilian clothes at the onset of anti-regime protests in March 2011. Hussam died from torture in one of the regime's detention facilities.

=== Arrest ===
In September 2011, Mustafa was arrested and detained in Damascus, where she reports having been beaten and going on a hunger strike. She had been a journalism and media student at the time, but after her arrest, her name was put on a public black-list and so she was forced to quit her education. After arriving at Germany in 2016. Mustafa continued her studies at Bard College Berlin where she graduated in HAST program.

=== Activist Work ===
Today, Wafa Mustafa works to obtain any information about her father and other detained refugees. She joined Families for Freedom in 2018 till the year 2021.

On 30 May 2020, Mustafa peacefully protested outside the courthouse in Koblenz, Germany site of the Al Khatib trial. Anwar Raslan, formerly a senior Syrian military intelligence official, and his alleged accomplice Eyad Al-Gharib faced trial in Germany under the legal principle of universal jurisdiction for crimes against humanity. They were accused of overseeing 58 murders and the torture of 4,000 others at the Damascus detention center. She surrounded herself with 61 photographs of detainees, including a photograph of her father. The trial was opened by German Federal Public Prosecutor against two former members of President Bashar Al Assad's security apparatus.

On 23 July 2020, Mustafa briefed the UN Security Council on forced disappearance and detention in Syria.

In November 2023, the New York Times covered a story detailing Mustafa's Pro-Palestinian activism in Germany in response the October 7th Attacks.
