= USS Quirinus =

1945 LST-542-class tank landing ship

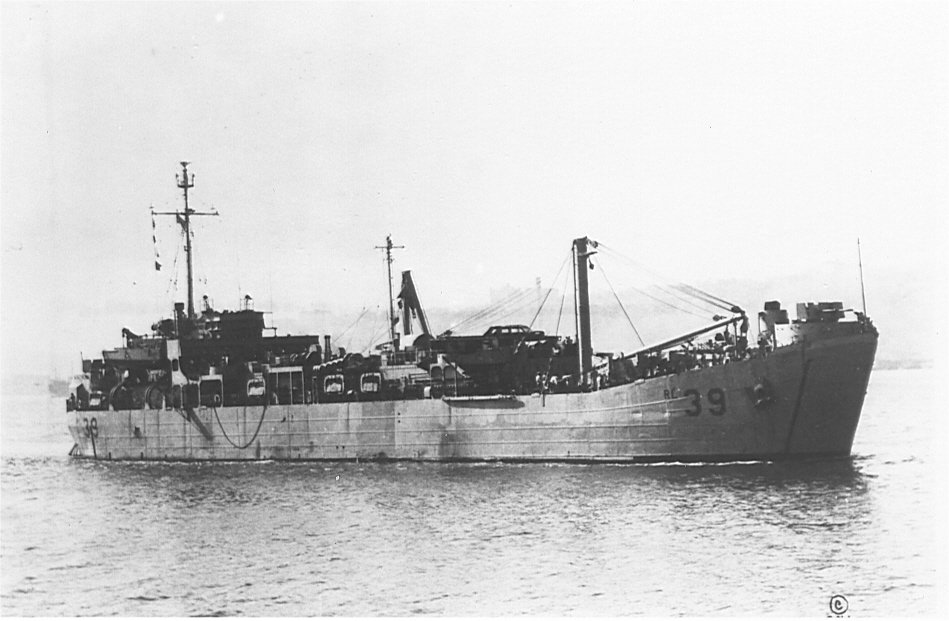

History

United States
- Name: Quirinus
- Builder: Chicago Bridge & Iron Company
- Laid down: 3 March 1945
- Launched: 4 June 1945
- Commissioned: 15 June 1945
- Decommissioned: 27 March 1947
- Fate: Transferred to Venezuela, June 1962

Venezuela
- Name: Guayana (T-18)
- Acquired: June 1962
- Out of service: 1970
- Fate: Scuttled. Used as a target ship

General characteristics
- Class & type: Achelous-class repair ship
- Displacement: 4,100 long tons (4,166 t)
- Length: 328 ft (100 m)
- Beam: 50 ft (15 m)
- Draft: 14 ft (4.3 m)
- Speed: 12 knots (14 mph; 22 km/h)
- Complement: 253 officers and enlisted men
- Armament: 8 × 40 mm; 8 × 20 mm

USS Quirinus (ARL-39), originally LST-1151, was one of 39 Achelous-class landing craft repair ships built for the United States Navy during World War II. Named for Quirinus (in Roman mythology, an early god of the Roman state, identified with Romulus), she was the only U.S. Naval vessel to bear the name.

== Initial operations ==
LST-1151 was laid down 3 March 1945 by the Chicago Bridge and Iron Company of Seneca, Illinois. The ship was then launched 4 June 1945 and placed in reduced commission 15 June 1945. Following initial commissioning, Quirinus steamed down the Mississippi River to New Orleans, then proceeded to Baltimore where she decommissioned for the completion of conversion to a landing craft repair vessel. Commissioned in full 6 November 1945 she completed shakedown in Chesapeake Bay and, on 23 January 1946 got underway for the Caribbean.

== Caribbean service ==
On the 29th, she reported to TU 29.6.1 at Guantanamo Bay, and remained there until she returned, briefly, to Norfolk in May. Reassigned to the 8th Fleet (TG 80.7), she anchored in Guantanamo Bay again 18 April. Abbreviated tours there and at Trinidad preceded her return to Norfolk 8 June. She operated as a unit of Boat Pool No. 4 until reporting for duty with the 2nd Task Fleet, 1 February 1947. For the next six weeks, she cruised in the Caribbean, returning to Norfolk, Virginia 15 March. In late June, she shifted to Charleston to begin inactivation.

== Decommissioning and transfer ==
Officially becoming a unit of the Florida Group, Atlantic Reserve Fleet on the 27th, she decommissioned and was berthed at Green Cove Springs, Florida until June 1962. She was then transferred on loan, under the Military Assistance Program, to the government of Venezuela. Renamed Guayana (T-18), she served that country into 1970.
