= The Natural State (film) =

2026 American documentary film

- Directed by: Matthew Dougherty
- Edited by: Matthew Dougherty; Robin Schwartz
- Music by: Matthew Dougherty
- Release date: September 2026 (Telluride)
- Running time: 100 minutes
- Country: United States
- Language: English

The Natural State is a 2026 American documentary film directed by Matthew Dougherty, about the Indian "anti-guru" U. G. Krishnamurti and Julie Thayer, a New York woman who filmed him for years after travelling to see him in the Swiss Alps in 1989. The film is built largely from Thayer's camcorder footage and her private journals. Jane Campion and Mahesh Bhatt are executive producers.

The film had its world premiere in the Backlot section of the Telluride Film Festival in September 2026.

== Synopsis ==
In 1989, Julie Thayer, a mother from New York City, left her life there to seek out U. G. Krishnamurti in the Swiss Alps. U. G., who described himself as an anti-guru, rejected followers and spiritual seeking. Thayer stayed, recorded their conversations, and kept a diary as his confrontational methods, which he called "blasting", took her from ecstasy to crisis. The film also covers U. G.'s rivalry with Jiddu Krishnamurti.

== Production ==
Dougherty began the project in 2008, after finding Thayer's footage and journals online while researching U. G. as a possible film subject; Thayer gave him permission to use the material. The film draws on hundreds of hours of camcorder footage that Thayer shot between 1989 and 2007, together with her journals, other archival video and images, and later interviews, including with Campion. Thayer narrates. Campion and Bhatt both knew U. G. personally, and Bhatt appears in the film. Dougherty composed the score and edited the film with Robin Schwartz, who also produced it. The film was finished in New York's Hudson Valley, where Dougherty and Schwartz moved in 2022; Coll Anderson mixed the sound.

== Release ==
The Natural State premiered at the 53rd Telluride Film Festival, held September 4–7, 2026, in the festival's Backlot section. Deadline published the film's trailer ahead of the premiere. It had its East Coast premiere in the documentary features section of the Woodstock Film Festival on October 17, 2026.

== Reception ==
Adit Ganguly of Variety India called the film an "electrifying 100-minute ride", writing that it "truly soars when dissecting his deeply strange rivalry with Jiddu Krishnamurti". Anders Ljung of Hammer to Nail described it as "formally inventive, psychologically gripping and ethically attentive", and wrote that Dougherty's "greatest accomplishment is his refusal to resolve that contradiction on the audience's behalf". Diane Carson, writing for the Alliance of Women Film Journalists, called it a "staggering, astute interrogation of the appeal" of U. G. Krishnamurti. Dan Mecca of The Film Stage wrote that "Dougherty is frankly brave to offer up a film with no good answers". Daniel Howat of Next Best Picture gave it 7 out of 10, calling it "a documentary that, while not necessarily satisfying, is endlessly fascinating". Megan McLachlan of The Contending called it "an ambitious directorial debut", finding it both fascinating and frustrating in leaving open who U. G. really was.
