= Luca Guadagnino's unrealized projects =

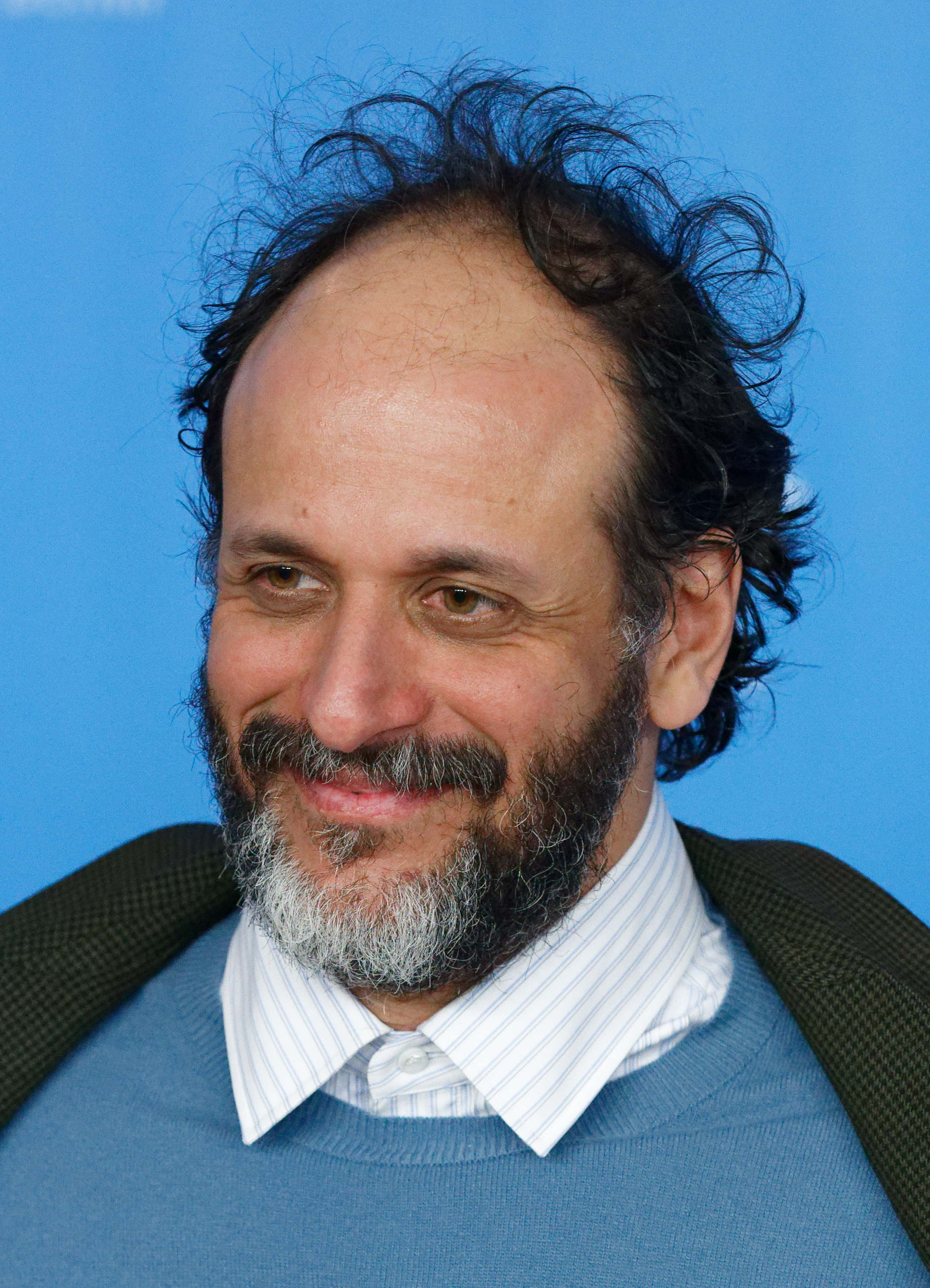
Guadagnino, pictured in 2017

Over the course of his career, Italian filmmaker Luca Guadagnino has amassed a number of projects he worked on that never progressed beyond the pre-production stage under his direction. Some of these projects fell in development hell or were cancelled, while others were abandoned during pre-production.

== 1990s ==
=== American Psycho ===
After the 1991 publication of Bret Easton Ellis's American Psycho in Italy, Guadagnino himself wrote a script adaptation of the novel. "I was obsessed with the book," he later said. "I was very sad when they made the movie because I wanted to make the movie." In October 2024, Guadagnino was entering final negotiations to direct a "new interpretation" of American Psycho, with Scott Z. Burns adapting for Lionsgate. It was rumored that Jacob Elordi would star in the lead role as Patrick Bateman, however that December, Variety confirmed that Austin Butler would be playing Bateman. At CinemaCon 2025, Guadagnino updated that "the script is coming out very handsomely" and that he was "in conversation with very exciting performers to play the leads." The following month, Chloë Sevigny, who had co-starred in the 2000 adaptation, was revealed to have pitched Guadagnino the idea of returning to play the same character. In June, Patrick Schwarzenegger was also named to possibly take on the lead role. When asked in September if Sevigny would appear in the film, Guadagnino replied, "I don't talk about American Psycho. [...] The answer is if the movie happens, for sure." In February 2026, Ellis divulged on his podcast that several high-profile actors had turned down the leading role, which he attributing to their reluctancy about living up to Christian Bale's portrayal of the character. The author went on to say that the initial script may not have been up to par, which is why it had been rewritten, with a new draft then circulating. As for how faithful the Guadagnino film would be to his source material and Mary Harron's version, he said to expect something "completely different." On August 7, journalist Jeff Sneider reported that Guadagnino was continuing to refine the script with Burns, whilst struggling to land on a lead actor. There was speculation that Lionsgate was losing patience and considering moving forward without him; with several possible replacements already identified by that point. In a GQ interview on August 13, Drew Starkey was asked about the rumor that he might be reteaming with Guadagnino on American Psycho. "No comment," Starkey said, before adding, "The script is amazing, though." In a Vulture profile promoting his newest film Artificial, Guadagnino suggested American Psycho was no longer happening but that "maybe one day I would do [it]".

=== The Penny Arcade Peep Show ===
In the early 1990s, Guadagnino wrote a script for a short film he wanted to do "on [the subject of] the male body", based on the "Penny Arcade Peep Show" excerpt from The Wild Boys: A Book of the Dead by William S. Burroughs. By late 1993, he sent British actress Tilda Swinton a letter via her agent, hoping to solicit her collaboration on the basis of her performances in Caravaggio and Orlando. After receiving no response back, a few months later, Guadagnino read that she would be in Rome for a panel about the late film director Derek Jarman. He accosted her outside the theater following the event, asking her to appear in the short film. "He said, 'I never made the film, because you never replied'," Swinton later recalled. She agreed, and stayed at Guadagnino's student house in Rome for a couple of days over the summer. "She was incredibly cool. The coolest," said Guadagnino. "After three days, she said, 'We are going to be partners in crime and the crime is cinema.'" While voice recordings of Swinton exist, and some footage allegedly shot, the film was abandoned and never completed after they ran out of money. The two would later instead go on to collaborate on his feature debut, the pseudo-documentary The Protagonists.

== 2000s ==
=== Too Young ===
In 2001, Screen Daily reported that Fabrizio Mosca's Rome production outfit Titti Film would produce an erotic thriller in the English language to be directed by Guadagnino, entitled Too Young. No such film was made.

=== Auntie Mame ===
In 2009, following their collaboration on I Am Love, Guadagnino and star Tilda Swinton had "high hopes" to reunite for a Hollywood remake of 1958's Auntie Mame. Guadagnino stated to Variety that they both envisioned their version being set in the present-day and done as a "rock-n-roll, super funny, super mainstream movie", adding that only Swinton could "do justice" to the story. The project has been described as one of his "dearest desires" as a director. Plans for the remake with Guadagnino attached were in place as of December 2011. However, by 2016, Swinton was presumably moving forward without his involvement, enlisting the duties of Annie Mumolo to write the adaptation.

== 2010s ==
=== Corsica '72 ===
In late 2010, Guadagnino signed on to direct the mafia thriller Corsica '72 for Ruby Films. The screenplay by writing duo Neal Purvis and Robert Wade was featured on The Black List in 2009 and is based on the true story of a stand-off between two former best friends, one a local man and the other, head of the Mafia. The director's position was preceded by Oliver Hirschbiegel and was succeeded by Park Chan-wook, though the film was never made.

=== Untitled English-language thriller film ===
In 2011, it was reported that Guadagnino was to make his English-language film debut for Scott Free Productions and StudioCanal, based on his original screenplay. Set on the island of Pantelleria, Guadagnino described the film as "a rock 'n' roll anthem of sex, love, murder and emotional rescue: A dive into the politics of desire between man and woman where one plus one makes four on the raw island of Pantelleria, lost in the Mediterranean." StudioCanal, who was providing financing, confirmed that the budget was under $30 million. It was set to feature both a U.S. and European cast. Though untitled, the project was referred to as a thriller in subsequent reports. Principal photography was reportedly set for 2012, but no further announcements followed. Guadagnino would later utilize the setting of Pantelleria for his remake of La Piscine, A Bigger Splash.

=== The Big Nowhere ===
In 2012, Guadagnino was reportedly in discussions with financiers to direct an adaptation of the James Ellroy novel The Big Nowhere, to be produced by Heyday Films' David Heyman and Jeffrey Clifford, along with Maurizio Grimaldi.

=== Body Art ===
In January 2013, it was reported by Variety that Guadagnino would direct Body Art, his screenplay adaptation of Don DeLillo's The Body Artist with Isabelle Huppert, Denis Lavant and David Cronenberg lined up to star. Sigourney Weaver joined the cast the following month. Shooting was scheduled for summer that year. Benoît Jacquot signed on to direct a new adaptation in 2015 and the film, titled Never Ever, was released the next year but without the involvement of Guadagnino or his cast.

=== A Reliable Wife ===
In 2014, Sony Pictures hired Guadagnino to replace Sam Taylor-Johnson as director on a film adaptation of Robert Goolrick's romantic period thriller novel A Reliable Wife, written by Andrew Kevin Walker. It was planned to be shot in winter that year.

=== Rio ===
In May 2017, it was announced Guadagnino was attached to direct Rio from a screenplay by Steven Knight, with Benedict Cumberbatch and Jake Gyllenhaal to star. In November 2017, Michelle Williams joined the project. However, in a profile for The New Yorker, Guadagnino said that the timing did not work out and he subsequently left the project.

=== Swan Lake ===
In July 2017, Guadagnino signed up to direct a pitch from Kristina Lauren Anderson inspired by the classic ballet story Swan Lake, with Felicity Jones in the lead role. Several studios including Universal, Paramount and TriStar bid for the film rights to the project, which was described as a "tentpole adaptation" of Pyotr Ilyich Tchaikovsky's ballet, that would follow the material closely.

=== Find Me ===
Guadagnino first alluded to making a sequel to Call Me by Your Name in November 2017, and confirmed in March 2018 he was working on the story with writer André Aciman. Timothee Chalamet would announce in October that same year he and Armie Hammer were intending to return for the sequel, and Guadagnino would approach Dakota Johnson for a role. In a March 2020 interview, Guadagnino reiterated that the film, entitled Find Me, was set to be made, with Michael Stuhlbarg and Esther Garrel also set for role reprisals. However plans were put on hold as a result of the COVID-19 pandemic. In May 2021, Guadagnino would cast doubts on the film being made as a result of his and Chalamet's other commitments, in addition to several abuse allegations being levied against Hammer. In 2022 Guadagnino implied that he still liked the idea of following Elio's story. That same year he told Variety, "I would love to make a second and third and fourth chapter of all my movies, Why? Because I truly love the actors I work with, so I want to repeat the joy of doing what we did together." Adding, "there is no hypothesis, so there is no movie. It’s a wish and a desire, and I have not made up my mind about what would be the story."

=== Buddenbrooks ===
In the autumn/winter 2017 issue of Fantastic Man, Guadagnino stated that his dream project was an adaptation of Thomas Mann's 1901 novel Buddenbrooks, and that making it "would in a way encompass all my themes in one story." In 2024, Guadagnino announced officially that he was developing Buddenbrooks alongside writer Francesca Manieri, which he saw as a companion piece to his film Queer.

=== Salah Abdeslam biopic ===
In the same Fantastic Man interview, Guadagnino also spoke of wanting to make a film about Islamic terrorist Salah Abdeslam; "There's something interesting about him. [...] I think it'd be a great film, but I need the right person to write it with me."

=== Burial Rites ===
In December 2017, it was reported that Guadagnino would direct Jennifer Lawrence in a film of Burial Rites, based on the true story of Agnes Magnúsdóttir who was accused of murder in a small Icelandic village in 1830.

=== Suspiria Part Two ===
Guadagnino's 2018 film Suspiria, a remake of Dario Argento's 1977 film of the same name was initially set up to be part one of a series, with the title initially set to include Part One as a subtitle. However Guadagnino would ultimately rule out a sequel in November 2020 as a result of the first film's poor box office performance.

=== Blood on the Tracks ===
Guadagnino told The New Yorker in October 2018 that he was planning to turn Bob Dylan's album Blood on the Tracks into a feature film, with Richard LaGravenese writing the screenplay. That December, Guadagnino revealed that Chloë Grace Moretz had been cast in an "important" role. According to New York Times reporter Kyle Buchanan, Guadagnino couldn't get the budget he wanted for it from the studio. He was still hoping to one day make a film of LaGravenese's script as of 2022.

=== Wartime Lies ===
It was additionally announced by The New Yorker in October 2018 that Guadagnino "desperately wanted" to direct Stanley Kubrick's abandoned project based on Louis Begley's Holocaust novel Wartime Lies. He asked David Kajganich to write the screenplay based on Kubrick's research materials. In September 2020, Guadagnino reaffirmed his intentions to make a film of Wartime Lies, stating that he had examined Kubrick's papers in the director's archive at University of the Arts London. Guadagnino's continued interest in the film has been acknowledged as of 2024, though other projects may have put it on temporary hold.

=== Lord of the Flies ===
In July 2019, Deadline Hollywood reported Guadagnino entered negotiations to direct a new adaptation of William Golding's Lord of the Flies for Warner Bros. The project would find a screenwriter in April 2020, with Patrick Ness hired. No additional announcements were made on the project until September 2023, where producer Lindsey Anderson Beer would reveal Guadagnino was still involved.

=== Intimacy ===
As early as 2019, Guadagnino had begun work on a documentary called Intimacy, filmed in 35 mm, about "the state of exception that has been established" in the years following the attacks of the Bataclan in Paris. He interviewed a "vast number" of theoreticians for the project, including Alain Badiou.

== 2020s ==
=== Scarface ===
In May 2020, Guadagnino was hired to direct a new version of Scarface for Universal Pictures, with Joel and Ethan Coen writing the screenplay. In September 2022, Guadagnino expressed his hopes for the film, emphasizing that he wants his version of Tony Montana to be "current", and the film to be "shocking". In November 2023, he revealed he was no longer involved in the project.

=== Scotty Bowers biopic ===
In July 2020, a narrative feature biopic about Hollywood hustler Scotty Bowers was announced to be in development at Searchlight Pictures, based on the 2017 documentary Scotty and the Secret History of Hollywood which the rights had been acquired for the year prior. Guadagnino was hired to direct the adaptation, with Seth Rogen and Evan Goldberg writing the script. That September, Guadagnino told Kyle Buchanan of The New York Times that he had been approached about the project a couple years prior but stressed that "it should be a comedy, a really great comedy." As a result, the first writers he tasked with the script were Goldberg and Rogan, feeling they would both properly understand Bowers' "generosity and nonjudgementalness" as a person. Guadagnino viewed Bowers as a "beautifully paradoxical" figure, akin to Chauncey Gardiner, Peter Sellers' character from Being There.

=== Untitled Frank Ocean music video ===
In August 2020, Guadagnino told Kyle Buchanan of The New York Times that he'd recently worked with Frank Ocean on a secret project, which was likely hamstrung as result of the COVID-19 pandemic. "We were collaborating on a music video that never happened," he said.

=== Spring Awakening ===
When asked during an October 2020 interview for The Playlist if he had ever considered directing a musical, Guadagnino answered "many times"; and went on to add that he had discussed with Steven Sater the possibility of bringing to screen his musical Spring Awakening.

=== Brideshead Revisited miniseries ===
On November 6, 2020, the BBC was reported to be adapting Evelyn Waugh's novel with Guadagnino set to write and direct, and Ralph Fiennes, Cate Blanchett and Andrew Garfield named as potential members of the cast. Guadagnino would confirm the cast, in addition to Harry Lawtey and Rooney Mara, in September 2022, but revealed that as a result Guadagnino needing $110 million to make the series and not being able to compromise on this, BBC and HBO would shelve the project.

=== Leading Men ===
On November 23, 2020 it was reported that Matthew López was set to write an adaptation of Christopher Castellani's novel Leading Men, with Guadagnino and Peter Spears producing and Searchlight Pictures distributing. On September 9, 2024 it was reported that Guadagnino was also set to direct the film.

=== Audrey Hepburn biopic ===
It was announced in January 2022 that Apple Studios had entered development with Guadagnino on a Audrey Hepburn biopic, with Rooney Mara cast to star as Hepburn. Filming had been slated to begin in late 2023, however Mara would announce in February 2024 that Guadagnino had exited the project.

=== The Shards miniseries ===
In June 2023 during an interview with the Spanish publication, El Independiente, Bret Easton Ellis confirmed that Guadagnino would direct an upcoming TV series adaptation of his novel The Shards for HBO with Ellis himself saying that he may direct some episodes as well. This would have been Guadagnino's second project for HBO after We Are Who We Are. However, in May 2024, it was announced that Kristoffer Borgli would be directing and executive producing the series, with no mention of Guadagnino still being involved.

=== Separate Rooms ===
In March 2024, Guadagnino told la Repubblica his next project would be Separate Rooms, a film adaptation of Pier Vittorio Tondelli's 1989 novel Camere separate. A few days later, Variety reported Josh O'Connor was in talks to star. In April, Léa Seydoux was cast as the female lead, opposite O'Connor. In October, Separate Rooms was listed as one of Guadagnino's four major dream projects alongside Buddenbrooks, Suspiria and Queer. In May 2025, O'Connor confirmed he was no longer attached to the project, saying "[Guadagnino] may well do it, but unfortunately it won't be with me". In March 2026, Connor Storrie was said to take over the role.

=== Sgt. Rock ===
On September 3, 2024, reports emerged that Guadagnino would be directing an adaptation of the DC Comics title Sgt. Rock at Warner Bros., from a script by Challengers and Queer screenwriter Justin Kuritzkes. Guadagnino was rumored to have been in talks to direct a film under James Gunn and Peter Safran's new leadership at the studio for several months prior. The Sgt. Rock comics were expected to be adapted as a period piece set during World War II. On November 13, 2024, Daniel Craig was listed in an issue of Production Weekly as the star of the film, which was then in "active development". A week later, it was officially confirmed by Deadline Hollywood that Craig would be reteaming with Guadagnino and Kuritzkes for Sgt. Rock following their collaboration on Queer as actor, director and writer, respectively. Though there was potential for the project to fall apart if the deals with Guadagnino and Craig did not go through, DC Studios was said to be "bullish" on Kuritzkes's script and it was expected to be Guadagnino's next film ahead of his planned adaptation of American Psycho. In February 2025, Craig dropped out of the film, reportedly attributed to a mixture of scheduling conflicts and his personal dissatisfaction with the reception of Queer. Another actor was sought to replace Craig, with DC Studios eventually landing on Colin Farrell after pursuing several potential candidates. Roles were also offered to Mikey Madison, Taylor Russell, Mike Faist and David Jonsson. By April, the project was halted as a result of scheduling issues. Up until that point, recurring collaborators including DP Sayombhu Mukdeeprom, composers Trent Reznor and Atticus Ross, and costume designer Jonathan Anderson had all been set in place. Upon cancellation, Guadagnino signed on to direct Artificial in its place. Reflecting on the film not materializing, Kuritzkes stated that they were not particularly interested in making a traditional superhero film with Sgt. Rock, adding that he was excited about the film's focus on "everyday heroes, humans, [and] normal people, where the superheroes were really not the focus at all", which he described as a more experimental approach to the superhero genre. The writer said the crew were "more or less" in pre-production by the time that production was halted, and deferred to DC Studios to explain why their version did not move forward. Faist had reportedly been attached to the film before production halted but continued having discussions with Guadagnino about potential projects they could work on. He conceded that there were multiple technical factors that contribute to films not eventuating.

=== My Best Friend's Wedding sequel ===
In Variety's 2025 cover story on After the Hunt, star Julia Roberts admitted that she was in talks about returning for a planned sequel to My Best Friend's Wedding, to be written by Celine Song. Guadagnino immediately jumped in, saying he'd happily direct Roberts in it without hesitation. Speaking to Deadline in January 2026, Roberts revealed that Guadagnino was already preparing another vehicle for her.
