= Antonia (2015 film) =

2015 Italian film about Antonia Pozzi

Antonia.
- Official release poster
- Directed by: Ferdinando Cito Filomarino
- Screenplay by: Ferdinando Cito Filomarino; Carlo Salsa
- Story by: Ferdinando Cito Filomarino; Carlo Salsa
- Produced by: Luca Guadagnino; Marco Morabito; Christos V. Konstantakopoulos
- Starring: Linda Caridi; Filippo Dini; Alissio Praticò; Maurizio Fanin
- Cinematography: Sayombhu Mukdeeprom
- Production companies: Frenesy Film Company; Rai Cinema
- Release date: 2015
- Running time: 96 minutes
- Country: Italy
- Language: Italian

Antonia (stylized as Antonia. with a period) is a 2015 Italian film directed by Ferdinando Cito Filomarino about the Italian poet Antonia Pozzi (1912-1938). The film follows the last decade of Pozzi's life in 1930s Milan. The film follows Pozzi's education, infatuation with her professor and Greek epic poetry, and her journey through womanhood troubled by depression and loneliness.

== Cast ==
- Linda Caridi as Antonia Pozzi
- Filippo Dini as Antonio Maria Cervi
- Alessio Praticò as Remo Cantoni
- Perla Ambrosini as Teresita
- Federica Fracassi as Lina Cavagna Sangiuliani Pozzi

== Production ==
After Filomarino's Patricia Highsmith-inspired short film Diarchia caught the attention of Italian director Luca Guadagnino, Guadagnino approached Filomarino about directing a biopic about Pozzi, a project which Guadagnino intended to pursue but was too busy with his movie A Bigger Splash (2015). The cinematography was done by Guadagnino and Apichatpong collaborator Sayombhu Mukdeeprom.

== Release ==
The film premiered in the main competition at the 50th Karlovy Vary International Film Festival, in which it received a Special Jury Mention.
