= Frenesy Film Company =

Italian film production company

Frenesy Film Company S.r.l.
- Type: Società a responsabilità limitata (S.r.l.)
- Industry: Entertainment
- Founded: 2012; 14 years ago
- Founder: Luca Guadagnino
- Headquarters: Crema, Lombardy, Italy
- Products: Feature films; Short films
- Website: frenesyfilm.com

Frenesy Film Company S.r.l. is an Italian film production company founded by Luca Guadagnino.

== History ==
Luca Guadagnino founded Frenesy Film Company in 2012. Initially, the company was founded to produce short films for fashion houses including Salvatore Ferragamo, DKNY, Zegna, Sergio Rossi, Fendi, Armani, Cartier, Pomellato, and Valentino.

== Filmography ==
Year	Title	Director	Ref.
2013	Bertolucci on Bertolucci	Walter Fasano and Luca Guadagnino	
2014	Belluscone: A Sicilian Story	Franco Maresco	
2015	Antonia	Ferdinando Cito Filomarino	
2015	A Bigger Splash	Luca Guadagnino	
2017	Call Me by Your Name	Luca Guadagnino	
2018	Suspiria	Luca Guadagnino	
2019	The Staggering Girl	Luca Guadagnino	
2020	The Truffle Hunters	Michael Dweck and Gregory Kershaw	
2020	Salvatore: Shoemaker of Dreams	Luca Guadagnino	
2020	Fiori, Fiori, Fiori	Luca Guadagnino	
2021	Beckett	Fernando Cito Filomarino	
2021	O Night Divine	Luca Guadagnino	
2022	Bones and All	Luca Guadagnino	
2023	Enea	Pietro Castellitto	
2023	Holiday	Edoardo Gabbriellini	
2024	Challengers	Luca Guadagnino	
2024	Diciannove	Giovanni Tortorici	
2024	Queer	Luca Guadagnino	
2024	April	Dea Kulumbegashvili	
2025	Atropia	Hailey Gates	
2025	After the Hunt	Luca Guadagnino	
2026	Ketticè	Giovanni Tortorici	
2026	Artificial	Luca Guadagnino	
