= Luca Guadagnino =

Italian filmmaker (born 1971)

- Guadagnino at the 2026 New York Film Festival
- Born: 10 August 1971 (age 55); Palermo, Sicily, Italy
- Education: Sapienza University of Rome (BA)
- Occupations: Film director; film producer; screenwriter
- Years active: 1997–present
- Partner: Ferdinando Cito Filomarino (2009–2020)

Luca Guadagnino (Italian: [ˈluːka ɡwadaɲˈɲiːno]; born 10 August 1971) is an Italian film director and producer. His films are characterized by their emotional complexity, eroticism, and lavish visuals. Guadagnino has received numerous accolades, including a Silver Lion and an Independent Spirit Award, alongside nominations for an Academy Award, three Golden Globes, and three BAFTAs.

Born in Palermo to an Algerian mother and a Sicilian father, Guadagnino spent part of his childhood in Ethiopia, but the family moved back to Italy to escape the Ethiopian Civil War. Guadagnino began his career directing short films and documentaries. He made his feature-film debut with The Protagonists (1999), the first of his many collaborations with actress Tilda Swinton. His follow-up Melissa P. (2005) was a commercial success in Italy but was met with mixed critical reception.

Guadagnino gained further acclaim with his Desire trilogy, which consists of the films I Am Love (2009), A Bigger Splash (2015), and Call Me by Your Name (2017). The latter brought him international recognition. Suspiria (2018), a remake of the 1977 film, was Guadagnino's first foray into the horror genre. It was a box office failure and polarized critics. Guadagnino made his television debut with the HBO coming-of-age miniseries We Are Who We Are (2020). He directed the romantic horror film Bones and All (2022), the romantic sports film Challengers (2024), the period romantic drama Queer (2024), the psychological thriller After the Hunt (2025), and the tech-dramedy Artificial (2026).

Guadagnino directed several documentaries including Salvatore: The Shoemaker of Dreams (2020) and Joie de vivre (2026). Aside from filmmaking, he has been involved in the world of fashion, directing advertisements for brands like Fendi and Salvatore Ferragamo. In 2012, Guadagnino founded the production company Frenesy Film Company. He also produced Belluscone: A Sicilian Story (2014), The Truffle Hunters (2020), Holiday (2023), and Enea (2023).

== Early life and education ==
Guadagnino was born on 10 August 1971 in Palermo, Sicily. His Algerian mother grew up in Casablanca, Morocco, and his Italian father was from Canicattì, Sicily. Guadagnino spent his early childhood in Ethiopia, where his father taught history and Italian literature at a technical school in Addis Ababa. The family left Ethiopia for Italy in 1977 to escape the Ethiopian Civil War and settled back in Palermo.

Guadagnino became interested in film making from around the age of nine, and started making amateur films after receiving a Super 8 camera from his mother. He developed a passion for cinema in earnest during adolescence and programmed VHS recordings of films shown on television. Some of the films cited as his early influences include Psycho (1960), Suspiria (1977) and Starman (1984). He also developed a particular fondness for the films of Ingmar Bergman. As a teenager, Guadagnino was a registered member of the Italian Communist Party, and wrote for the Palermo youth wing newspaper. He resigned his membership after a dispute with the newspaper editor, over the content of one of his interviews.

Guadagnino studied literature at the University of Palermo. He then transferred to the Sapienza University of Rome and completed his degree in literature and cinema history, with a thesis on the American filmmaker Jonathan Demme. At Sapienza he met actress Laura Betti and would often attend her parties and cook for guests, such as Bernardo Bertolucci and Valerio Adami. Guadagnino would later describe that experience as his "film school".

== Career ==
=== Early work (1999–2008) ===
Guadagnino made his directorial debut with the feature film The Protagonists (1999), which was presented at the Venice Film Festival. The film also marks his first collaboration with actresses Tilda Swinton, Fabrizia Sacchi, and editor Walter Fasano. In 2002, he directed Mundo Civilizado, a musical documentary, presented at the Locarno Film Festival in 2003. His 2004 documentary film Cuoco contadino, which follows Italian chef Paolo Masieri, was presented at the Venice Film Festival. His second feature film, erotic drama Melissa P. starring Spanish actress María Valverde, made a successful debut the following year.

=== Desire trilogy and other work (2009–2017) ===
In 2009, he directed, wrote, and produced the cult hit I Am Love. The first installment in Guadagnino's self-described Desire trilogy, was co-produced, and developed by Tilda Swinton—who also stars in the film—over a 7-year period. Presented at a number of international festivals, the film was an immediate success with critics and audiences alike. In 2010, it was nominated for the Academy Award for Best Costume Design, the Golden Globe for Best Foreign Film, and the BAFTA Award for Best Film Not in the English Language.

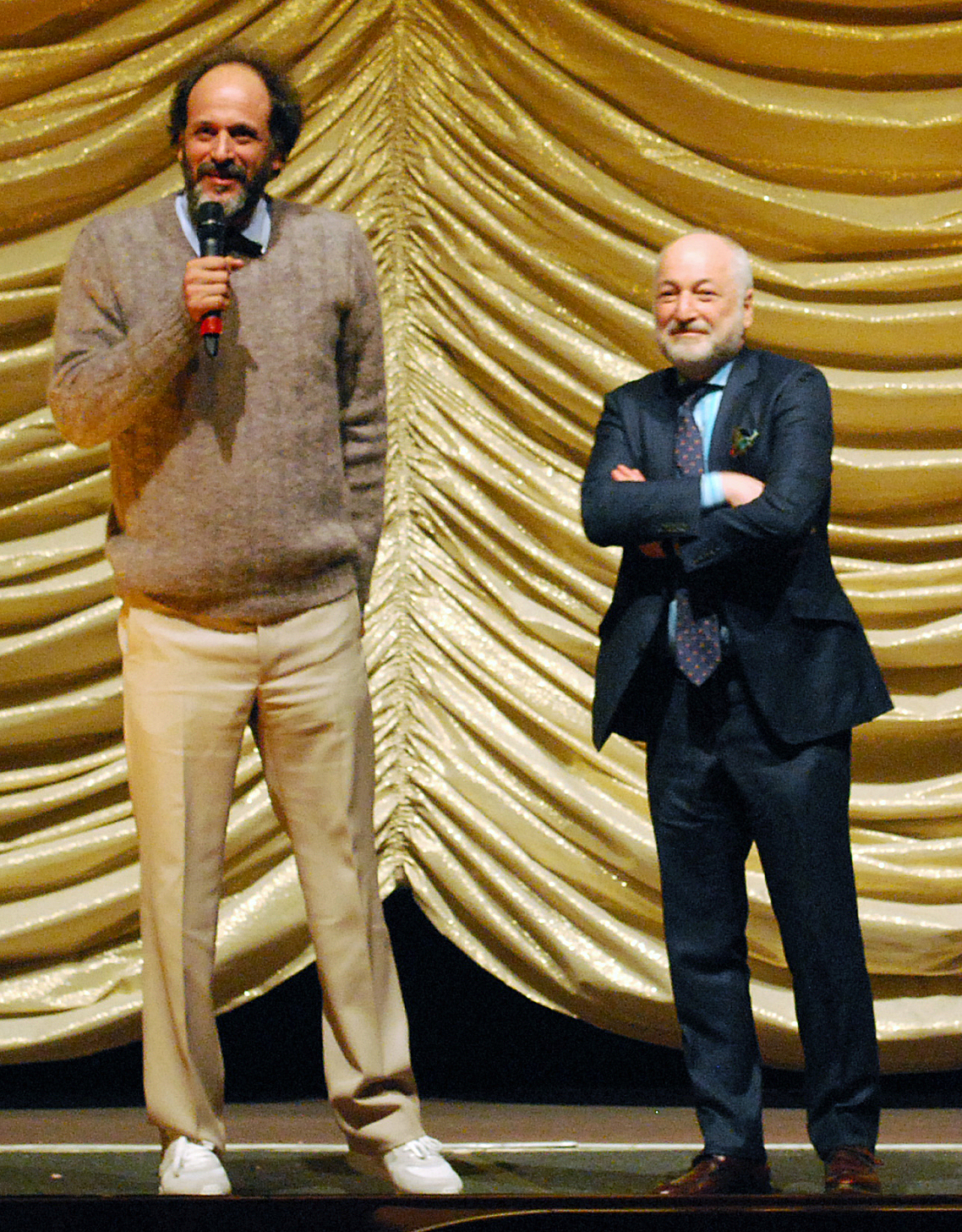
Guadagnino and André Aciman at a screening of Call Me by Your Name, at the 2017 Berlin International Film Festival

In 2011, Guadagnino directed Inconscio Italiano, a feature-length documentary film presented at the Locarno Film Festival. He also worked on the documentary Bertolucci on Bertolucci (2013), which was shown at the Venice Film Festival, the London Film Festival and Paris Cinemathèque, and 50 other festivals in 2013 and 2014. Co-directed with Walter Fasano, the documentary was made from archival material and received top international accolades.

Guadagnino was a producer on the well-received short film Diarchia (2010), directed by Ferdinando Cito Filomarino and starring Guadagnino collaborator Alba Rohrwacher, the short won the Pianifica prize at the Locarno Film Festival, received a special mention at the Sundance Film Festival in 2011, was nominated for Best Short Film at the European Film Awards, and won the prize for Best Director of a Short Film at the Nastri d'Argento. Two years later he produced Edoardo Gabbriellini's feature film The Landlords, presented at the Locarno Film Festival. In 2015, Guadagnino produced Filomarino's debut feature film Antonia, a biopic about Italian poet Antonia Pozzi. Filomarino was inspired by Guadagnino's love of Pozzi's poetry to make the film.

In 2015, Guadagnino directed the second installment of the Desire Trilogy, erotic thriller A Bigger Splash, with Tilda Swinton, Matthias Schoenaerts, Ralph Fiennes and Dakota Johnson. The film is loosely based on the 1969 Jacques Deray film La Piscine. It had its premiere at the 72nd Venice Film Festival where it competed for the Golden Lion.

Guadagnino's next film was Call Me by Your Name, an adaptation of André Aciman's novel of the same name, starring Timothée Chalamet, Armie Hammer, and Michael Stuhlbarg. Filming took place in Crema, Italy, in May and June 2016, and the film debuted at the 2017 Sundance Film Festival. It was theatrically released in the United Kingdom on 27 October 2017, and in the United States on 24 November.

=== International recognition (2017–present) ===
In September 2015, Guadagnino announced at the 72nd Venice Film Festival his plans to direct a remake of Dario Argento's Suspiria. Guadagnino set his version in Berlin circa 1977—the year in which the original film was released—and aimed to focus on "the concept [and...] uncompromising force of motherhood." Tilda Swinton and Dakota Johnson starred in the film, reuniting from Guadagnino's A Bigger Splash. Shooting began in Italy in October 2016, and concluded on 10 March 2017, in Berlin. Suspiria premiered at the 75th Venice Film Festival and polarized critics.

In January 2019, it was announced Guadagnino had directed The Staggering Girl, a short film starring Julianne Moore, Kyle MacLachlan, Marthe Keller, KiKi Layne, Mia Goth and Alba Rohrwacher. The 35-minute short premiered during the 2019 Cannes Directors' Fortnight section. The following year, Guadagnino served as an executive producer on The Truffle Hunters, a documentary film directed by Michael Dweck and Gregory Kirshaw, which premiered at the Sundance Film Festival. and directed Salvatore Ferragamo: The Shoemaker of Dreams a documentary film revolving around Salvatore Ferragamo. The film had its world premiere at the Venice Film Festival on 5 September 2020.

In 2020, he wrote and directed We Are Who We Are, an eight-episode limited series for HBO, starring Chloë Sevigny, Kid Cudi, Alice Braga, Jack Dylan Grazer, Spence Moore II, Jordan Kristine Seamon, Faith Alabi, Corey Knight, Tom Mercier, Francesca Scorsese, Ben Taylor and Sebastiano Pigazzi. It premiered on 14 September 2020 to critical acclaim. In 2021, Guadagnino served as a producer on Beckett—previously titled Born to Be Murdered—directed by Ferdinando Cito Filomarino starring Alicia Vikander and John David Washington.

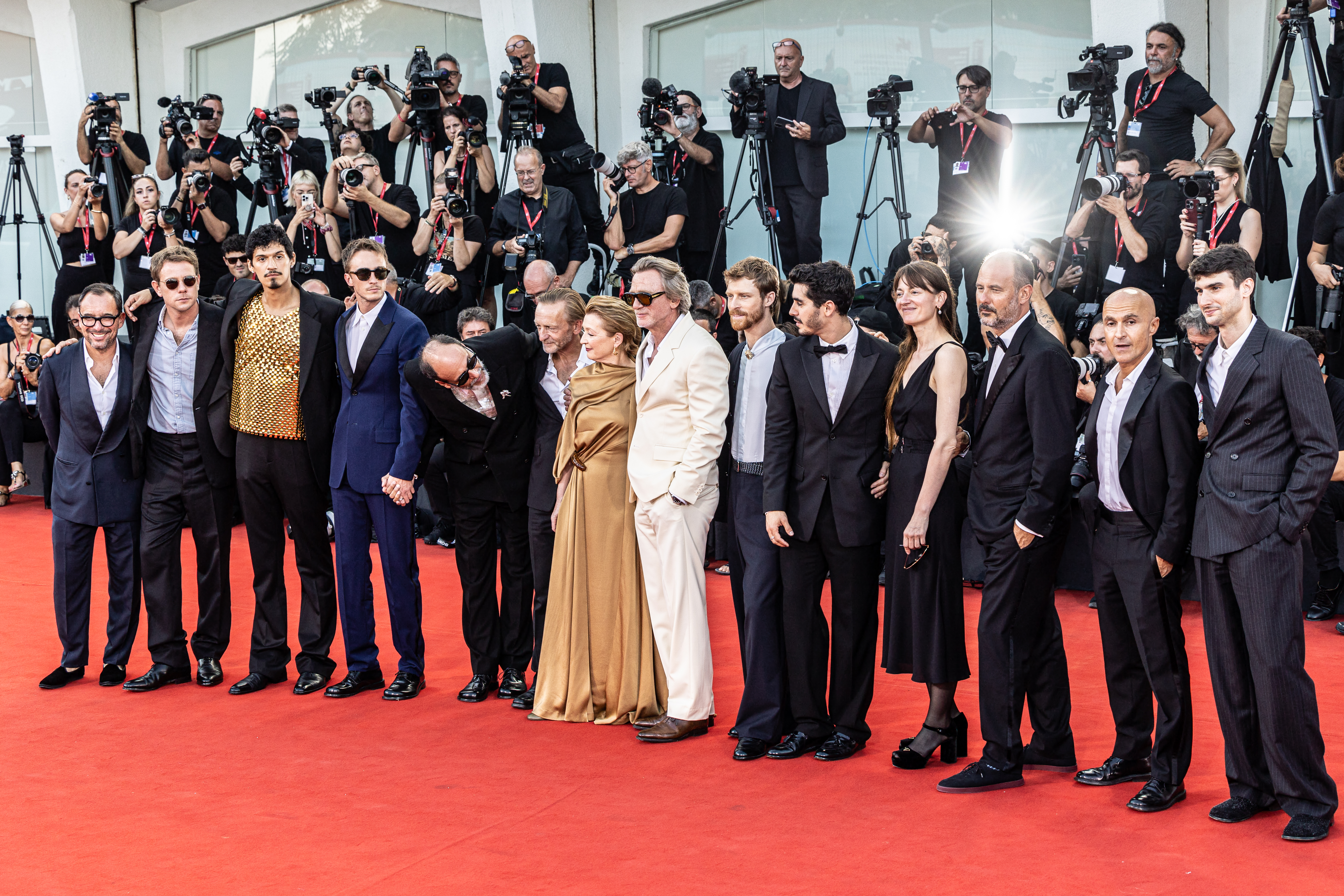
Guadagnino and the cast of Queer at the 81st Venice International Film Festival.

On 28 January 2021, it was reported that Guadagnino was going to direct an adaptation of Camille DeAngelis's 2015 novel about teenage cannibals Bones & All, with Timothée Chalamet and Taylor Russell in talks to star. The film, Bones and All, had its world premiere at the 79th Venice International Film Festival on 2 September 2022, where it won Silver Lion for best direction. In 2023, he co-produced two Italian films and one short film, under his production company Frenesy Film Company: Margherita Giusti's The Meatseller, Pietro Castellitto's Enea and Edoardo Gabbriellini's Holiday. The three projects premiered at the 80th Venice International Film Festival and 2023 TIFF, respectively.

On 11 February 2022, he signed on to direct the sports drama film Challengers, starring Zendaya, Josh O'Connor and Mike Faist. It was filmed in Boston in 2022 and was released in the United States on April 26, 2024, being acclaimed by critics and grossing over $90 million worldwide. That same year he produced Giovanni Tortorici's Diciannove and Dea Kulumbegashvili's April. April premiered at the 81st Venice International Film Festival, where it competed for the Golden Lion. Tortorici's film also premiered at Venice in the Orizzonti section. Guadagnino's second film of the year was an adaptation of William S. Burroughs novel Queer, with Daniel Craig in the lead. The film is set in 1950s Mexico City and Ecuador and follows an outcast American expatriate (Craig) who becomes infatuated with a much younger man (Drew Starkey). Filming was completed at Cinecittà studios in Rome in June 2023. The film premiered at the 81st Venice International Film Festival, where it competed for the Golden Lion. It received generally positive reviews.

Guadagnino's ext film was a thriller called After the Hunt, written by Nora Garrett and starring Julia Roberts, Andrew Garfield, Ayo Edebiri, Michael Stuhlbarg, and Chloë Sevigny. The film was made by Amazon MGM Studios and Imagine Entertainment. Principal photography took place between July and August 2024 in London and Cambridge University. The film premiered out of competition in the 82nd Venice International Film Festival and received mixed reviews. The film was released on October 10, 2025 and bombed at the box office, grossing $9.5 million on a $70–80 million production budget. He also served as producer on Hailey Gates' directorial feature debut Atropia, which finished shooting in July 2023, under his Frenesy banner.

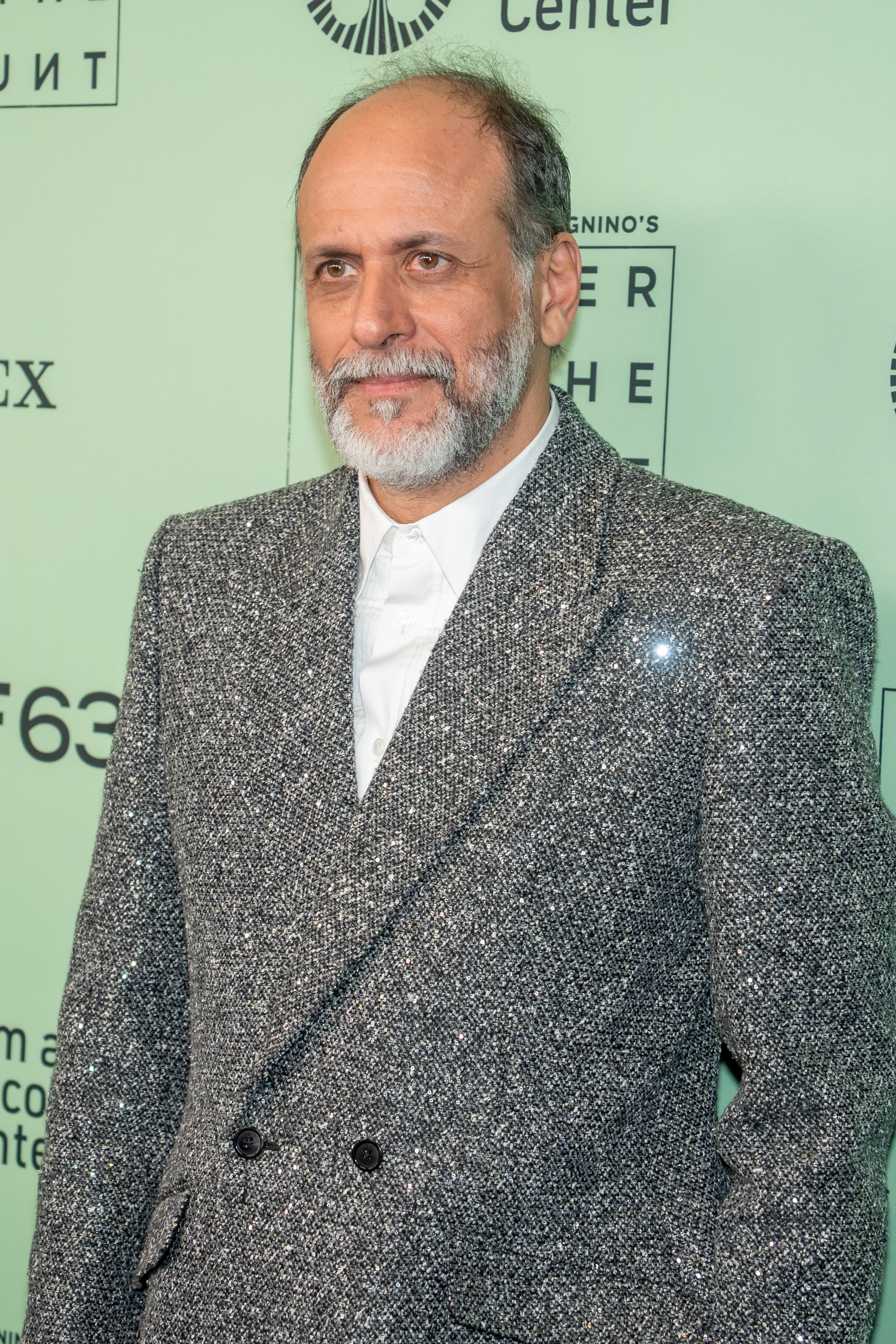
Guadagnino at the 2025 New York Film Festival

By early 2025, Guadagnino was confirmed as the director of Artificial, written by Simon Rich and based on the brief dismissal of Sam Altman as CEO of OpenAI, a move led by Ilya Sutskever. Principal photography took place between July and October 2025 in Italy, with a theatrical release planned for 2026. It will star Andrew Garfield, Yura Borisov, Cooper Koch, Ike Barinholtz, Cooper Hoffman, Jason Schwartzman and Monica Barbaro. Amazon MGM Studios was originally attached to distribute the film worldwide, marking their fifth collaboration with Guadagnino (following Suspiria, Bones and All, Challengers, and After the Hunt). By mid-2026, the film was dropped by Amazon for unspecified reasons, but the move received scrutiny for happening a few days after Amazon signed a $50 billion deal with OpenAI. Shortly after, producers began shopping the film to other distributors while the film was in the last stages of post-production. Initially facing rejection from several major studios, worldwide distribution rights were ultimately picked up by Neon, which will release the film on December 25th, 2026.

==== Prospective projects ====
Guadagnino was attached to direct multiple projects including a biographical film about Hollywood hustler Scotty Bowers, and an adaptation of Lord of the Flies, with Patrick Ness adapting the book for Warner Bros. In March 2024, Guadagnino told la Repubblica his next project would be Separate Rooms, a film adaptation of Pier Vittorio Tondelli's 1989's novel, Camere separate. Variety reported Josh O'Connor was in talks to star. By early 2025, O'Connor revealed he was no longer attached to star in it.

In May 2020, it was announced that Guadagnino would direct a new adaptation of Scarface, with the screenplay written by Joel and Ethan Coen. In November 2023, Guadagnino announced he was no longer attached to direct.

In October 2024, Guadagnino was entering final negotiations to direct a "new interpretation" of Bret Easton Ellis's 1991 novel, American Psycho, with Scott Z. Burns adapting for Lionsgate. In December of the same year, Variety reported that Austin Butler was in discussions to star as Patrick Bateman.

=== Other activities ===
Guadagnino has served twice on the jury of the Torino Film Festival: in 2003 for the short film section and in 2006 for the official jury. In 2010, he was a member of the Venice Film Festival. In 2011, he served as president of the Beirut Film Festival, and on the jury of the Locarno Film Festival.

Outside of film, he began working with the Italian fashion house Fendi in 2005. In 2012, he created Frenesy Film Company, a creative agency and production company that conceives and implements communications for luxury brands and produces fashion films, video and print advertising, and high-profile creative events.

Guadagnino served as a gastronomic critic for Vanity Fair Italia for several years, writing over sixty reviews for the magazine.

Guadagnino headed the jury for Louis Vuitton's Journey Awards in 2012, an international competition dedicated to young filmmakers. He also participated as a jury member in the first edition of Fashion Film Festival Milano in 2014, chaired by Franca Sozzani, chief editor of Vogue Italia. In December 2011, he made his debut as an opera director with Falstaff by Giuseppe Verdi at the Teatro Filarmonico in Verona, Italy.

Luca Guadagnino will preside over the jury of the upcoming Marrakech International Film Festival, replacing Thomas Vinterberg, who had previously been appointed president of the fest's jury but "had to excuse himself for family reasons," according to a festival statement.

== Influences and style ==
Guadagnino cited seeing the desert in the film Lawrence of Arabia at age five, as his "first impression of a screen, which had nothing to do with the actual film." Despite being influenced by Italian filmmakers such as Bernardo Bertolucci, Roberto Rossellini, Luchino Visconti, Dario Argento and Pier Paolo Pasolini, Guadagnino considers himself to be an international filmmaker rather than an Italian filmmaker, and has expressed a wish to be seen as Algerian one (given the nationality of his mother), saying: "[...] I grew up in Ethiopia. I came to Italy when I was seven. In my mind, deep emotions and visual landscapes are from Ethiopia and not Palermo or any place in Italy. I arrived in Italy as an outsider." He has also said during his youth he was an "isolated" person who was "healing" himself with cinema and "finding a lot of solace" in horror movies. Other directors Guadagnino cites as influences include Alfred Hitchcock, Jean-Luc Godard, Nagisa Oshima, Rainer Werner Fassbinder, and Douglas Sirk. For the 2012 Sight & Sound directors' poll, Guadagnino listed, The Blue Gardenia, Come and Go, Fanny and Alexander, The Fury, Goodbye South, Goodbye, Histoire(s) du cinéma, In the Realm of the Senses, Journey to Italy, Psycho and Veronika Voss as his favourite films.

=== Frequent collaborators ===
Guadagnino usually has a long-standing group of actors and crew who participate in most of his work. Actors who usually appear in his films include Tilda Swinton, Fabrizia Sacchi, Alba Rohrwacher, Chloë Sevigny, Timothée Chalamet, Dakota Johnson, and Michael Stuhlbarg. Swinton has appeared in four of his films and was the subject of the documentary short Tilda Swinton: The Love Factory. Sacchi has appeared in three of his features and various other projects, such as the short films L'uommo risacca and The Staggering Girl, as well as in the documentary Mundo Civilizado. Rohrwacher has also appeared in The Staggering Girl as well as in the Guadagnino produced short Diarchia. Aside from starring in Call Me By Your Name and Bones and All, Chalamet also had a small cameo in We Are Who We Are.

Yorick Le Saux and Sayombhu Mukdeeprom are Guadagnino's most frequent cinematographers. Le Saux has worked in I Am Love, A Bigger Splash, three episodes of We Are Who We Are, and several of Guadagnino's fashion films. Mukdeeprom shot his two most recent films, Antonia and Beckett, as well as the short film The Staggering Girl.

Walter Fasano has been Guadagnino's main editor since 1997, having worked in every project of his until Suspiria. Guadagnino regularly works with producers, Francesco Melzi d'Eril, Marco Morabito, and screenwriter David Kajganich.

Collaborator	Role	The Protagonists	Melissa P.	I Am Love	A Bigger Splash	Call Me By Your Name	Suspiria	We Are Who We Are	Bones and All	Challengers	Queer	After the Hunt	Artificial	Total
Walter Fasano (Note: Also screenwriter for I Am Love.)	Editor	Yes	Yes	Yes	Yes	Yes	Yes							6
Marco Morabito	Producer			Yes	Yes	Yes	Yes	Yes	Yes					6
Francesco Melzi d'Eril	Producer			Yes		Yes	Yes	Yes	Yes					5
Giulia Piersanti	Costume designer				Yes	Yes	Yes	Yes	Yes			Yes		6
Marco Costa	Editor							Yes	Yes	Yes	Yes	Yes	Yes	5
Sayombhu Mukdeeprom	Cinematography					Yes	Yes			Yes	Yes			4
Tilda Swinton	Actress	Yes		Yes	Yes		Yes							4
Trent Reznor and Atticus Ross	Composers								Yes	Yes	Yes	Yes		4
Fabrizia Sacchi	Actress	Yes	Yes				Yes							3
Yorick Le Saux	Cinematography			Yes	Yes			Yes						3
David Kajganich	Screenwriter				Yes		Yes		Yes					3
Lorenzo Mieli	Producer								Yes	Yes	Yes			3
Chloë Sevigny	Actress							Yes	Yes			Yes		3
Michael Stuhlbarg	Actor					Yes			Yes			Yes		3
Jessica Harper	Actress						Yes		Yes					2
Barbara Alberti	Screenwriter		Yes	Yes										2
Jonathan Anderson	Costume designer									Yes	Yes		Yes	3
Justin Kuritzkes	Screenwriter									Yes	Yes			2
Alba Rohrwacher	Actress		Yes	Yes										2
Dakota Johnson	Actress				Yes		Yes							2
Elena Bucci	Actress				Yes	Yes								2
Timothée Chalamet (Note: Also co-producer for Bones and All.)	Actor					Yes			Yes					2
Andrew Garfield	Actor											Yes	Yes	2
Mark Rylance	Actor								Yes				Yes	2
Thaddea Graham	Actress											Yes	Yes	2
Malik Hassan Sayeed	Cinematography											Yes	Yes	2

== Personal life ==
Guadagnino lived and worked in a 17th-century palazzo in Crema. He no longer lives in Crema, citing a lack of privacy due to the success of Call Me By Your Name. As of 2024, he lives in Milan. From 2009 to 2020, he was in a relationship with Ferdinando Cito Filomarino. In a 2026 interview with Vulture, Guadagnino revealed that he is married.

== Filmography ==
=== Feature film ===
Year	Title	Director	Producer	Writer
1999	The Protagonists	Yes	No	Yes
2005	Melissa P.	Yes	No	Yes
2009	I Am Love	Yes	Yes	Yes
2015	A Bigger Splash	Yes	Yes	No
2017	Call Me by Your Name	Yes	Yes	No
2018	Suspiria	Yes	Yes	No
2022	Bones and All	Yes	Yes	No
2024	Challengers	Yes	Yes	No
2024	Queer	Yes	Yes	No
2025	After the Hunt	Yes	Yes	No
2026	Artificial	Yes	Yes	No

Producer only

- The Landlords (2012)
- Belluscone: A Sicilian Story (2014)
- Antonia (2015)
- Ombre dal fondo (2016)
- The Truffle Hunters (2020)
- Beckett (2021)
- Enea (2023)
- Holiday (2023)
- Diciannove (2024)
- April (2024)
- Atropia (2025)
- Ketticè (2026)

=== Documentary film ===
Year	Title	Director	Writer	Producer	Notes
2003	Mundo civilizado	Yes	No	No	
2003	The Making of Lotus	Yes	No	No	Documentary about the 2003 album Lotus by Italian singer Elisa
2004	Cuoco contadino	Yes	Yes	No	
2008	The Love Factory No. 3 Pippo Delbono – Bisogna morire	Yes	Yes	Yes	
2011	Inconscio italiano	Yes	No	No	
2013	Bertolucci on Bertolucci	Yes	No	Yes	co-directed with Walter Fasano
2020	Salvatore: Shoemaker of Dreams	Yes	No	No	
2026	Joie de vivre	Yes	Yes	No	

Documentary short

- Tilda Swinton: The Love Factory (2002)
- Arto Lindsay Perdoa a Beleza (The Love Factory Series) (2004)

=== Short film ===
Year	Title	Director	Writer	Producer
1997	Qui	Yes	No	No
2000	L'uomo risacca	Yes	No	No
2001	Au Revoir	Yes	Yes	No
2002	Rosso	No	No	Yes
2007	Part Deux	Yes	No	No
2007	Delfinasia	No	No	Yes
2010	Diarchia	No	No	Yes
2010	Chronology	Yes	Yes	No
2019	The Staggering Girl	Yes	No	Yes
2020	Fiori, Fiori, Fiori	Yes	Yes	Yes
2021	O Night Divine	Yes	No	Yes
2023	The Meatseller	No	No	Yes
2025	Camraderie	Yes	Yes	Yes
2026	We Are Windows	Yes	No	Yes

=== Television ===
Year	Title	Director	Writer	Producer	Notes
2020	We Are Who We Are	Yes	Yes	Yes	Miniseries

=== Music videos ===
Year	Title	Artist	Notes	Ref
2000	"Vamos a Bailar (Esta Vida Nueva)"	Paola & Chiara		
2000	"Asile's World"	Elisa		
2001	"Amo le ragazze"	Francesco Boccia		
2001	"Sconvolto così"	Irene Grandi		
2001	"Luce (Tramonti a nord est)"	Elisa		
2002	"Who Said (Stuck in the UK)"	Planet Funk		
2003	"Broken"	Elisa		
2004	"Il gigante"	Paola Turci		
2005	"Swan"	Elisa		
2006	"Non mi lasciare qui"	Sergio Cammariere		
2018	"Mystery of Love"	Sufjan Stevens	Original song from Call Me by Your Name	
2021	"Tell Me You Love Me"	Sufjan Stevens		
2021	"Toy Boy"	Colapesce; Dimartino; Ornella Vanoni		
2022	"You Made It Feel Like Home"	Trent Reznor; Atticus Ross	Original song from Bones and All	
2024	"Te Maldigo"	Omar Apollo	Original song from Queer	

=== Lyricist ===
Year	Title	Movie	Notes
2024	"Compress / Repress"	Challengers	co-writer credit on the song

=== Advertising ===
Year	Title	Director	Writer	Producer	Brand	Ref.
2012	Destinée	Yes	No	No	Cartier	
2012	Here	Yes	Concept by	No	Starwood	
2012	One Plus One	Yes	No	No	Giorgio Armani	
2012	The Switch	No	No	Yes	Tod's	
2013	Adele's Dream	No	No	Yes	Fendi	
2013	Walking Stories	Yes	No	Yes	Salvatore Ferragamo	
2014	A Rose Reborn	No	No	Yes	Ermenegildo Zegna	
2021	SS21	Yes	Concept by	Yes	Salvatore Ferragamo	
2021	Aston Martin DBX X Luca Guadagnino	Yes	Yes	No	Aston Martin	
2024	See You at 5	Yes	Concept by	Yes	Chanel	

=== Theatre ===
Year	Title	Theatre	Ref.
2011	Falstaff	Teatro Filarmonico	
2026	The Death of Klinghoffer	Maggio Musicale Fiorentino Theatre	

== Awards and nominations ==
Year	Award	Category	Nominated work	Result	Ref.
1999	Venice Film Festival	FEDIC Award - Special Mention	The Protagonists	Won	
2008	Turin Film Festival	Best Italian Documentary Film	The Love Factory No. 3	Won	
2009	Venice Film Festival	Queer Lion	I Am Love	Nominated	
2010	Berlin International Film Festival	Best Feature Film	I Am Love	Nominated	
2010	Boulder International Film Festival	Best Feature Film	I Am Love	Won	
2010	Nastro D'Argento Awards	Best Original Story	I Am Love	Nominated	
2010	Santa Barbara International Film Festival	Best International Film	I Am Love	Nominated	
2011	Alliance of Women Film Journalists Awards	Best Non-English Language Film	I Am Love	Nominated	
2011	British Academy Film Awards	Best Film Not in the English Language	I Am Love	Nominated	
2011	Broadcast Film Critics Association Awards	Best Foreign Language Film	I Am Love	Nominated	
2011	Golden Globe Awards	Best Foreign Language Film	I Am Love	Nominated	
2014	Nastro D'Argento Awards	Best Documentary About Cinema	Bertolucci on Bertolucci	Nominated	
2015	Venice Film Festival	Golden Lion	A Bigger Splash	Nominated	
2015	Venice Film Festival	Soundtrack Stars Award	A Bigger Splash	Won	
2015	Venice Film Festival	Best Innovative Budget Award	A Bigger Splash	Won	
2017	The Advocate's Person of the Year		—N/a	Finalist	
2017	Adelaide Film Festival	Best Feature	Call Me by Your Name	Nominated	
2017	Berlin International Film Festival	Best Feature Film	Call Me by Your Name	Nominated	
2017	Chéries-Chéris Film Festival	Best Feature Film	Call Me by Your Name	Won	
2017	Chicago Film Critics Association Awards	Best Film	Call Me by Your Name	Nominated	
2017	Chicago Film Critics Association Awards	Best Director	Call Me by Your Name	Nominated	
2017	Dallas–Fort Worth Film Critics Association Awards	Best Film	Call Me by Your Name	4th place	
2017	Florida Film Critics Circle Awards	Best Film	Call Me by Your Name	Nominated	
2017	Ghent International Film Festival	Best Film	Call Me by Your Name	Nominated	
2017	Gotham Independent Film Awards	Best Feature	Call Me by Your Name	Won	
2017	Gotham Independent Film Awards	Audience Award	Call Me by Your Name	Nominated	
2017	IndieWire Critics Poll	Best Film	Call Me by Your Name	7th place	
2017	IndieWire Critics Poll	Best Director	Call Me by Your Name	2nd place	
2017	Lisbon & Estoril Film Festival	Best Film	Call Me by Your Name	Won	
2017	Lisbon & Estoril Film Festival	Audience Award	Call Me by Your Name	Nominated	
2017	Ljubljana International Film Festival	Best Feature	Call Me by Your Name	Won	
2017	Los Angeles Film Critics Association Awards	Best Film	Call Me by Your Name	Won	
2017	Los Angeles Film Critics Association Awards	Best Director	Call Me by Your Name	Won	
2017	National Board of Review Awards	Top Ten Films of the Year	Call Me by Your Name	Won	
2017	Melbourne International Film Festival	Best Narrative Feature	Call Me by Your Name	Won	
2017	Miskolc International Film Festival	Emeric Pressburger Award	Call Me by Your Name	Won	
2017	Online Film Critics Society Awards	Best Picture	Call Me by Your Name	Nominated	
2017	San Diego Film Critics Society Awards	Best Film	Call Me by Your Name	Nominated	
2017	San Francisco Bay Area Film Critics Circle	Best Film	Call Me by Your Name	Nominated	
2017	San Sebastián International Film Festival	Best Film	Call Me by Your Name	Nominated	
2017	St. Louis International Film Festival	Audience Choice Award	Call Me by Your Name	Won	
2017	Sydney Film Festival	Audience Award	Call Me by Your Name	2nd place	
2017	Toronto International Film Festival	People's Choice Award	Call Me by Your Name	3rd place	
2017	Village Voice Film Poll	Best Director	Call Me by Your Name	4th place	
2017	Washington D.C. Area Film Critics Association Awards	Best Film	Call Me by Your Name	Nominated	
2018	AACTA International Awards	Best Direction	Call Me by Your Name	Nominated	
2018	Academy Awards	Best Picture	Call Me by Your Name	Nominated	
2018	American Film Institute Awards	Top Ten Films of the Year	Call Me by Your Name	Won	
2018	Amanda Awards	Best Foreign Feature Film	Call Me by Your Name	Nominated	
2018	Austin Film Critics Association Awards	Best Film	Call Me by Your Name	Nominated	
2018	British Academy Film Awards	Best Film	Call Me by Your Name	Nominated	
2018	British Academy Film Awards	Best Direction	Call Me by Your Name	Nominated	
2018	Capri Hollywood International Film Festival	Filmmaker of the Year	Call Me by Your Name	Won	
2018	Critics' Choice Movie Awards	Best Director	Call Me by Your Name	Nominated	
2018	Dorian Awards	Film of the Year	Call Me by Your Name	Won	
2018	Dorian Awards	Director of the Year (Film and Television)	Call Me by Your Name	Nominated	
2018	Dorian Awards	LGBTQ Film of the Year	Call Me by Your Name	Won	
2018	Empire Awards	Best Film	Call Me by Your Name	Nominated	
2018	European Film Awards	People's Choice Award for Best European Film	Call Me by Your Name	Won	
2018	Georgia Film Critics Association Awards	Best Picture	Call Me by Your Name	Nominated	
2018	Golden Ciak Awards	Best Film	Call Me by Your Name	Won	
2018	Golden Ciak Awards	Best Producer	Call Me by Your Name	Nominated	
2018	Golden Globe Awards	Best Motion Picture – Drama	Call Me by Your Name	Nominated	
2018	Houston Film Critics Society Awards	Best Picture	Call Me by Your Name	Nominated	
2018	Independent Spirit Awards	Best Film	Call Me by Your Name	Nominated	
2018	Independent Spirit Awards	Best Director	Call Me by Your Name	Nominated	
2018	International Cinephile Society Awards	Best Picture	Call Me by Your Name	Won	
2018	International Cinephile Society Awards	Best Director	Call Me by Your Name	Runner-up	
2018	London Film Critics' Circle Awards	Film of the Year	Call Me by Your Name	Nominated	
2018	London Film Critics' Circle Awards	Director of the Year	Call Me by Your Name	Nominated	
2018	Los Angeles Italia Film Festival	Excellence Award	Call Me by Your Name	Won	
2018	Nastro d'Argento Awards	Best Film	Call Me by Your Name	Nominated	
2018	Nastro d'Argento Awards	Best Director	Call Me by Your Name	Nominated	
2018	Producers Guild of America Awards	Best Theatrical Motion Picture	Call Me by Your Name	Nominated	
2018	Satellite Awards	Best Film	Call Me by Your Name	Nominated	
2018	Venice Film Festival	Golden Lion	Suspiria	Nominated	
2018	Venice Film Festival	Queer Lion	Suspiria	Nominated	
2019	Independent Spirit Awards	Robert Altman Award	Suspiria	Won	
2022	Gothenburg Film Festival	Honorary Dragon Award	—N/a	Won	
2022	Provincetown International Film Festival	Filmmaker on the Edge Award	—N/a	Won	
2022	Venice Film Festival	Silver Lion	Bones and All	Won	
2022	Venice Film Festival	Golden Lion	Bones and All	Nominated	
2022	Zurich Film Festival	A Tribute to... Award	—N/a	Won	
2022	Independent Spirit Awards	Best Feature	Bones and All	Nominated	
2025	Golden Globe Awards	Best Original Song	"Compress / Repress"	Nominated	

== See also ==
- List of LGBTQ Academy Award winners and nominees
- List of Italian Academy Award winners and nominees
