= Beckett (film) =

2021 action thriller film

- Promotional poster
- Directed by: Ferdinando Cito Filomarino
- Screenplay by: Kevin A. Rice
- Story by: Ferdinando Cito Filomarino
- Produced by: Luca Guadagnino; Marco Morabito; Francesco Melzi d'Eril; Gabriele Moratti
- Starring: John David Washington; Boyd Holbrook; Vicky Krieps; Alicia Vikander; Michael Stuhlbarg
- Cinematography: Sayombhu Mukdeeprom
- Edited by: Walter Fasano
- Music by: Ryuichi Sakamoto
- Production companies: Frenesy Film Company; MeMo; Rai Cinema; RT Features; Wise Pictures
- Distributed by: Netflix
- Release dates: August 4, 2021 (Locarno); August 13, 2021 (United States)
- Running time: 108 minutes
- Countries: Italy; Brazil; Greece
- Language: English

Beckett is a 2021 action thriller film directed by Ferdinando Cito Filomarino and produced by Luca Guadagnino. The film stars John David Washington as an American tourist vacationing in Greece who becomes the target of a manhunt after an accident embroils him in a political conspiracy, and he must reach the embassy to clear his name; Boyd Holbrook, Vicky Krieps, and Alicia Vikander also star.

Beckett had its world premiere at the 74th Locarno Film Festival on August 4, 2021, and was digitally released on August 13, by Netflix. The film received mixed reviews from critics.

== Plot ==
Beckett, an American tourist, leaves Athens, Greece with his girlfriend April to escape political unrest there. While driving to their hotel, at a mountain village in the region of Epirus, Beckett falls asleep at the wheel and crashes their car into a nearby house. April is killed in the accident, but while trapped in the wreck Beckett sees a boy being hurried out of the house by a blonde woman.

The next day Xenakis, a local police officer, interviews Beckett and tells him that he was lucky that the house he crashed into was abandoned; however, Beckett tells Xenakis about seeing the boy and the woman. After leaving the police station, Beckett goes back to the house with the intention of killing himself, but before he can do so the blonde woman returns and shoots at him. Xenakis arrives soon after and tells him it is safe to come out of hiding, but after he reveals himself, Beckett is wounded in the arm as both the woman and Xenakis shoot at him and give chase. Beckett jumps off a cliff and escapes.

After spending the night in an abandoned truck, Beckett is found by a group of hunters who lead Beckett back to town, with one taking Beckett to his house to see to his injuries. Xenakis and the woman soon arrive, and Beckett jumps out of a window to escape again. He happens upon two beekeepers who lend him a phone. He calls the U.S. embassy in Athens, but unable to wait for their help, Beckett tells them he will make his own way to the embassy. He boards a train to go back to Athens, but Xenakis finds him and attempts to detain him. Beckett pulls the train's emergency brake; in the ensuing struggle, Xenakis ends up getting shot in the foot and Beckett once again escapes.

Beckett sees posters of the boy being put up by two activists, Lena and Eleni. They tell him that the boy is Dimos Karras, the kidnapped nephew of a liberal politician who has been allegedly taken by a far-right organization. They drive Beckett to Athens, but he is forced to part ways with them to avoid a police roadblock. Beckett takes the subway to the U.S. embassy, but on the way he is attacked by a knife-wielding man. Managing to reach the embassy, Beckett is taken in by embassy staffer Tynan, who informs him that April's body had been sent to the embassy, and Beckett is taken to the morgue to view her body.

Beckett tells Tynan about Dimos' kidnappers and the activists, and Tynan offers to take him to an honest cop to sort things out. However, after leaving the embassy, Tynan drives to a rough neighborhood and then tries to incapacitate Beckett with a taser but Beckett is able to escape. Beckett meets up with Lena and Eleni to warn them about Tynan, but Tynan soon arrives with the police and chases Beckett, who flees to a political rally. Shots are fired at the rally and amongst the chaos Beckett takes refuge in a basement where he is cornered by a gun-wielding Tynan, who tells him Karras has just been assassinated at the rally. Tynan reveals that Karras had secretly owed money to an organized crime syndicate, who then kidnapped his nephew in retaliation but deflected the blame onto his political enemies, also implying that the U.S. had a role to play in the deception. Fearing that Beckett had uncovered the truth behind Dimos' kidnapping, the syndicate went after him. Although Tynan assures Beckett that with Karras dead he is now free to go, Beckett does not trust him, knocks him out and takes his gun.

Beckett returns to the site of the rally to reunite with Lena and Eleni but sees the blonde woman who had kidnapped Dimos. He follows her to a parking garage, where she meets up with Xenakis, who has Dimos locked in the trunk of his car. Before they can escape, Beckett shoots Xenakis in the hand and struggles with the blonde woman. Beckett is shot but manages to knock her out, then runs after Xenakis as he tries to drive away. Beckett manages to jump onto the car from a higher level of the parking garage and knocks out Xenakis, finally rescuing Dimos. In the final scene, Beckett looks down at his palm and notices the heart April had drawn on his hand before the crash, reflecting on how he should have died in the crash.

== Cast ==
- John David Washington as Beckett, an American tourist and April's boyfriend.
- Boyd Holbrook as Stephen Tynan, an employee of the U.S. embassy in Athens.
- Vicky Krieps as Lena, a German political activist in Greece.
- Alicia Vikander as April Hanson, Beckett's girlfriend.
- Michael Stuhlbarg as April's father
- Maria Votti as Eleni, a political activist and Lena's colleague.
- Panos Koronis as Officer Xenakis, a corrupt Greek police officer.
- Lena Kitsopoulou as a woman who works with Xenakis to hunt down Beckett.
- Daphne Alexander as Thalia Symon, a British-Greek journalist.
- Makis Papadimitriou as a knife-wielding man who attacked Beckett at subway.

== Production ==
It was announced in April 2019 that John David Washington, Alicia Vikander, Boyd Holbrook and Vicky Krieps had been cast in the film, then titled Born to Be Murdered, and that it would be produced by Luca Guadagnino. Filming had gotten underway in Athens that same month.

== Release ==
In October 2020, Netflix acquired distribution rights to the film, and set it for a 2021 release. In January 2021, it was announced that the film had been retitled to Beckett. It had its world premiere at the 74th Locarno Film Festival on August 4, 2021. The film was released on August 13, 2021.

== Reception ==
On the review aggregator website Rotten Tomatoes, 49% of 76 critics gave the film a positive review, with an average rating of 5.5/10. The site's critics consensus reads: "Beckett brings a propulsive energy to its man-on-the-run story, but this rather thinly written thriller fails to consistently engage." According to Metacritic, which assigned a weighted average of 52 out of 100 based on 24 critics, the film received "mixed or average reviews".
