= Ferdinando Cito Filomarino =

Italian film director and screenwriter

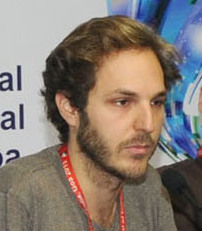
- Cito Filomarino at the 46th International Film Festival of India in 2015
- Born: 27 November 1986 (age 39); Milan, Italy
- Education: University of Bologna
- Occupations: Film director; screenwriter
- Years active: 2010–present
- Relatives: Luchino Visconti (great great-uncle)

Ferdinando Cito Filomarino (born 27 November 1986) is an Italian film director and screenwriter.

== Career ==
In 2010, Cito Filomarino wrote and directed Diarchy, a short film starring Louis Garrel, Riccardo Scamarcio, and Alba Rohrwacher. It screened at the Locarno Film Festival on 7 August 2010 and the Sundance Film Festival on 21 January 2011. In 2015, he made his feature film directorial debut Antonia., about poet Antonia Pozzi. Cito Filomarino also directed two short films starring Małgosia Bela, Await and Closing In.

In April 2019, it was announced Cito Filomarino would direct Beckett starring John David Washington, Alicia Vikander, Boyd Holbrook and Vicky Krieps; among the producers are Luca Guadagnino and Marco Morabito. It is based on an original story by Cito Filomarino and the screenplay was written by Kevin Rice.

Cito Filomarino has collaborated on numerous projects with director Luca Guadagnino, whom he also shared a long-term personal relationship with, including serving as his second unit director on A Bigger Splash, Call Me by Your Name, and Suspiria.

== Filmography ==
Feature film

Year	Title	Director	Writer
2015	Antonia.	Yes	Yes
2021	Beckett	Yes	Story

Short film

Year	Title	Director	Writer	Notes
2010	Diarchy	Yes	Yes	
2013	L'inganno	Yes	Yes	Documentary
2016	Await	Yes	Yes	Ad for Agnona
2017	Closing In	Yes	Yes	Ad for Agnona

Editor

Year	Title	Notes
2013	Inconscio italiano	Documentary
2012	Here	Ad for Starwood
2012	One Plus One	Ad for Giorgio Armani

== Awards and nominations ==
Throughout his career, Cito Filomarino has received 5 awards and 9 nominations.

- 2010: Pianifica Award for Diarchy (Won).
- 2010: Golden Pardino - Legends of Tomorrow for Diarchy (Nominated).
- 2010: European Film Award for European Short Film for Diarchy (Nominated).
- 2010: Prize of the City of Torino for Best Italian Short Film for Diarchy (Nominated).
- 2011: Silver Ribbon for Best Short Film Director for Diarchy (Won).
- 2011: Short Filmmaking Award - Honorable Mention for Diarchy (Won).
- 2011: Short Filmmaking Award for Diarchy (Nominated).
- 2015: Special Mention for Antonia (Won).
- 2015: Crystal Globe for Antonia (Nominated).
- 2016: New Directors Competition for Antonia (Nominated).
- 2016: Silver Ribbon for Best New Director for Antonia (Nominated).
- 2016: Olhar Award-Best Film for Antonia (Nominated).
- 2021: Variety Piazza Grande Award for Beckett (Nominated).
