= Glory to the Filmmaker Award =

Venice Film Festival award

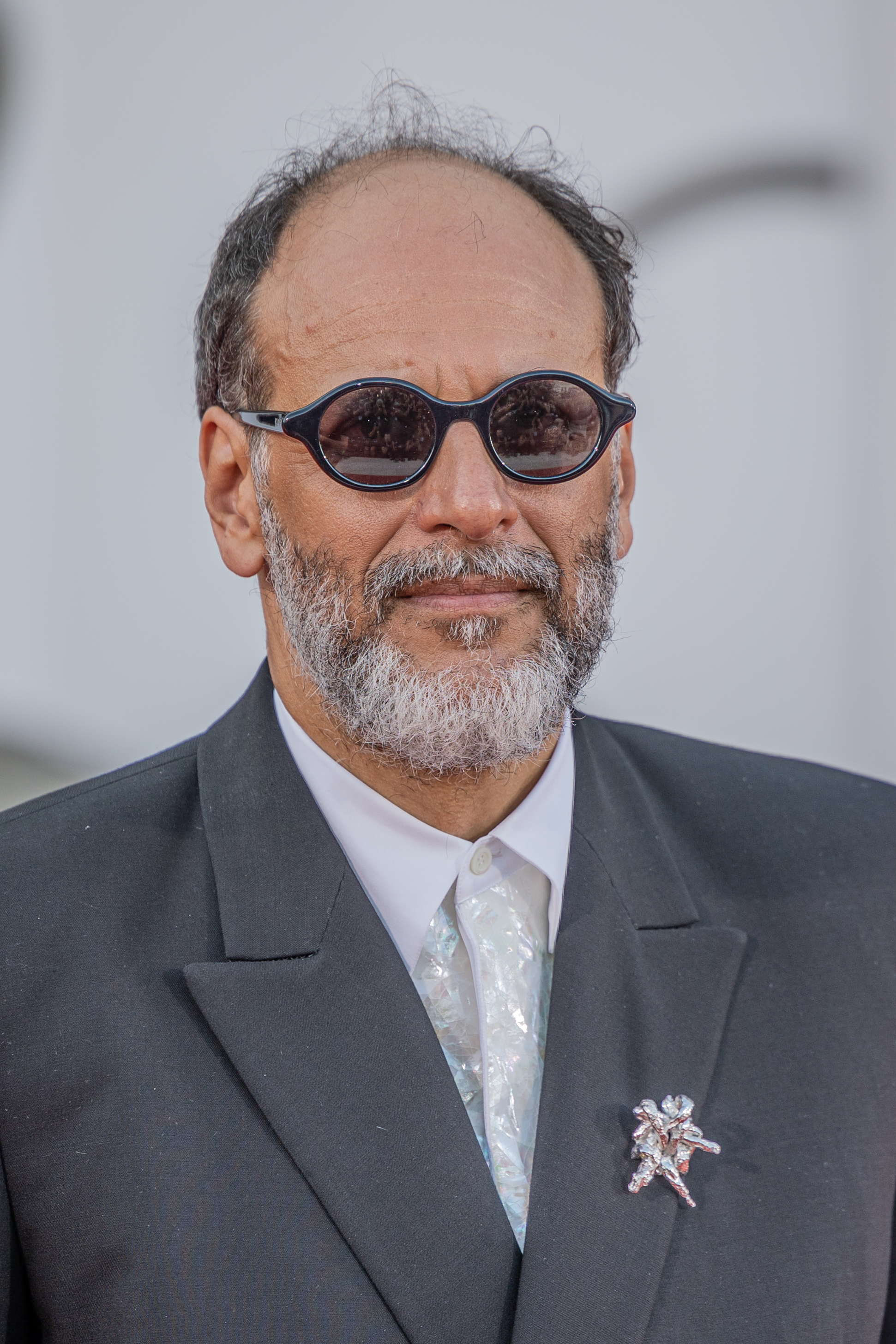
- 2026 recipient: Luca Guadagnino
- Location: Venice
- Country: Italy
- Presented by: Venice Film Festival and Cartier
- First award: 2006
- Currently held by: Luca Guadagnino (2026)
- Website: labiennale.org/cinema

Glory to the Filmmaker Award is an annual honorary prize organized by the Venice Film Festival in collaboration with Cartier, dedicated to personalities who have made a significant contribution to contemporary world cinema.

Among its winners are: Abbas Kiarostami, Agnès Varda, Al Pacino, Spike Lee, Ettore Scola, Costa-Gavras, Ridley Scott, and Claude Lelouch.

== History ==
Created during the 63rd edition, Japanese filmmaker Takeshi Kitano was the first recipient, and the award's name was taken from his comedy film Glory to the Filmmaker! (2006) released during the festival. Between 2006 and 2020, the award was sponsored by Swiss luxury watch and clock manufacturer Jaeger-LeCoultre. Since 2021, the award is sponsored by French luxury conglomerate Cartier.

== Recipients ==
=== 2000s ===
Year	Director	Film presented
2006	Takeshi Kitano	Glory to the Filmmaker! (監督·ばんざい!)
2007	Abbas Kiarostami	Shirin (شیرین)
2008	Agnès Varda	The Beaches of Agnès (Les plages d'Agnès)
2009	Sylvester Stallone	Rambo - Director's Cut

=== 2010s ===
Year	Director	Film presented
2010	Mani Ratnam	Raavan
2011	Al Pacino	Wilde Salomé
2012	Spike Lee	Bad 25
2013	Ettore Scola	How Strange to Be Named Federico (Che strano chiamarsi Federico)
2014	James Franco	The Sound and the Fury
2015	Brian De Palma	De Palma (directed by Noah Baumbach & Jake Paltrow)
2016	Amir Naderi	Monte
2017	Stephen Frears	Victoria & Abdul
2018	Zhang Yimou	Shadow (影)
2019	Costa-Gavras	Adults in the Room (Ενήλικοι στην αίθουσα)

=== 2020s ===
Year	Director	Film presented
2020	Abel Ferrara	Sportin' Life
2021	Ridley Scott	The Last Duel
2022	Walter Hill	Dead for a Dollar
2023	Wes Anderson	The Wonderful Story of Henry Sugar
2024	Claude Lelouch	Finalement
2025	Julian Schnabel	In the Hand of Dante
2026	Luca Guadagnino	Joie de vivre
