= Joie de vivre (film) =

- Italian: Joie de Vivre. Appunti, pensieri, parole, riflessioni, volti, visioni su Bernardo Bertolucci e la cinefilia del 20° secolo che non esiste più
- Directed by: Luca Guadagnino
- Written by: Luca Guadagnino; Carlo Antonelli
- Produced by: Francesco Melzi d'Eril; Gabriele Moratti
- Starring: Martin Scorsese; Jeremy Thomas; James Gray; David Cronenberg; Alfonso Cuarón; Catherine Breillat; Debra Winger; Francesca Manieri; Carlo Antonelli
- Cinematography: Simone D'Arcangelo; Sayombhu Mukdeeprom
- Edited by: Marco Costa
- Production company: MeMo Films
- Release date: 8 September 2026 (Venice)
- Running time: 435 minutes
- Country: Italy
- Languages: Italian; English; French

Joie de vivre (Note: Full title: JOIE DE VIVRE. Notes, thoughts, words, reflections, faces, visions, around Bernardo Bertolucci and the cinephilia of the 20th century that is no more (Italian: Joie de Vivre. Appunti, pensieri, parole, riflessioni, volti, visioni su Bernardo Bertolucci e la cinefilia del 20° secolo che non esiste più)) is a 2026 Italian documentary film directed by Luca Guadagnino, co-written with Carlo Antonelli. Composed of both archival footage and interviews with fans and collaborators, it explores Bernardo Bertolucci's filmmaking career and personal life. The title comes from an expression frequently used by Bertolucci regarding the beauty of filmmaking.

The film had its world premiere out of competition of the 83rd Venice International Film Festival on 8 September 2026.

== Background ==
Guadagnino had previously released a documentary on Bertolucci, titled Bertolucci on Bertolucci, in 2013. The documentary was co-directed by Guadagnino's longtime collaborator Walter Fasano.

== Cast ==
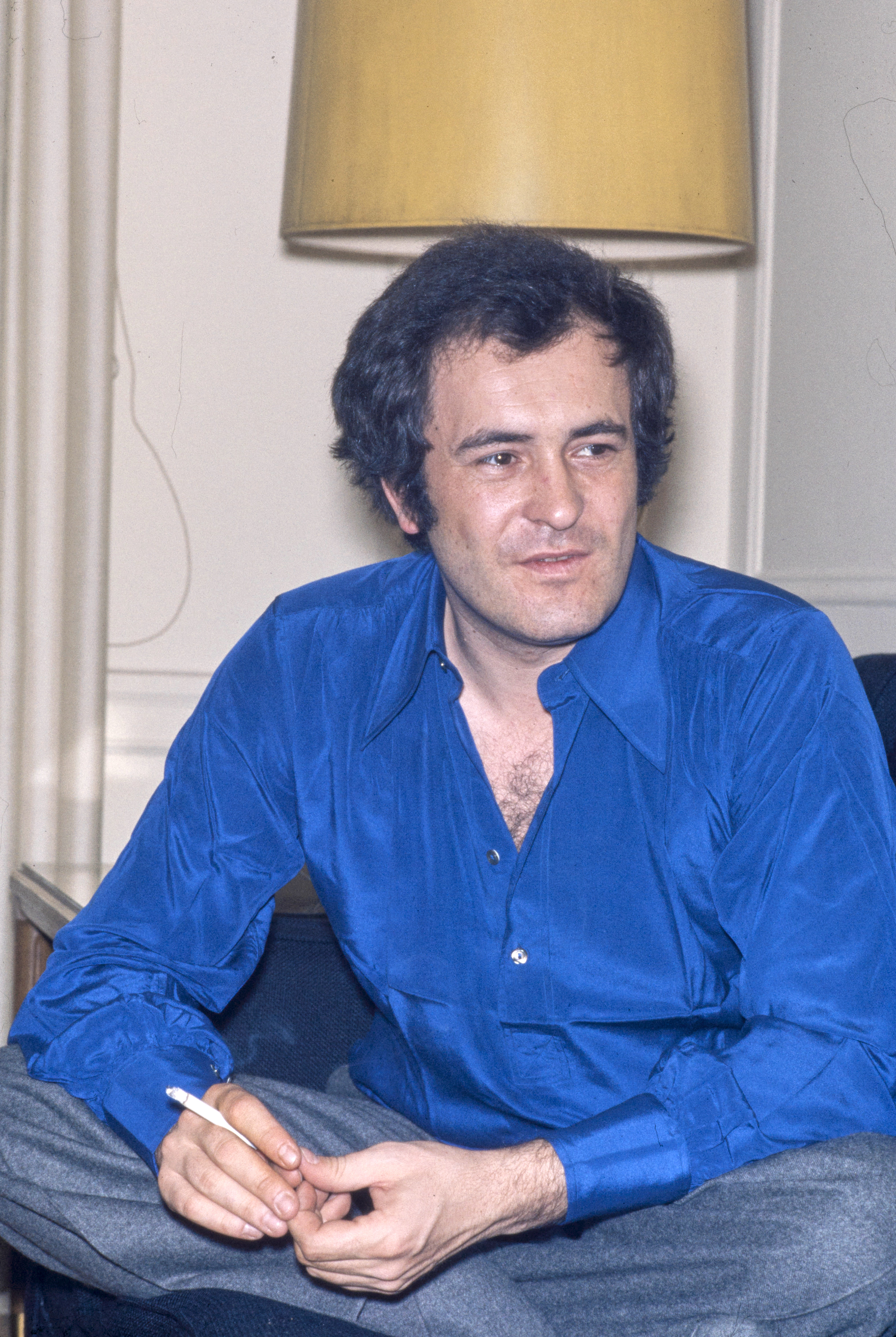
Bertolucci, c. 1971

- Bernardo Bertolucci (Note: Bertolucci exclusively appears in archival footage.)
- Martin Scorsese
- James Gray
- David Cronenberg
- Catherine Breillat
- Alfonso Cuarón
- Mark Cousins
- Debra Winger
- Margot Robbie
- Francesca Maneri
- Jeremy Thomas
- Murielle Joudet
- Armond White
- Mark Cousins

== Production ==
The film employs a combination of film and digital cinematography. Simone D'Arcangelo filmed the digital segments while Sayombhu Mukdeeprom, a frequent Guadagnino collaborator, shot segments on 35mm.

== Release ==
The first half of the film premiered at the 83rd Venice International Film Festival on 8 September 2026, with the second half set to premiere on September 9, 2026.

Directly preceding the first half's premiere, Guadagnino was awarded the Cartier's Glory to the Filmmaker Award, which recognizes individuals who have made a sizable contribution to the contemporary film industry.

== Critical reception ==
The documentary received positive reviews from critics. Ryan Lattanzio, writing for IndieWire, described the film as "Guadagnino's most personal movie to date", and that despite the seven-hour run time the film "justifies most of its minutes". For The Hollywood Reporter, David Rooney wrote that "admirers of Bertolucci's work will find plenty to appreciate", however noted that "Guadagnino's sensibilities may ultimately be ill-suited for documentary".

In a review for Deadline, Damon Wise criticised the film for pushing aside Bertolucci in favour of extended interview segments "even while the speakers on screen complain that Bertolucci was often pushed aside as a filmmaker".
