= Holiday (2023 film) =

2023 film by Edoardo Gabbriellini

- Theatrical release poster
- Directed by: Edoardo Gabbriellini
- Written by: Edoardo Gabbriellini; Carlo Salsa
- Produced by: Olivia Musini; Lorenzo Mieli; Luca Guadagnino
- Starring: Margherita Corradi
- Cinematography: Amine Messadi
- Edited by: Walter Fasano
- Production companies: Cinemaundici; Vision Distribution; The Apartment Pictures; Frenesy Film Company
- Distributed by: Europictures
- Release dates: 8 September 2023 (TIFF); 23 October 2023 (Italy)
- Running time: 102 minutes
- Country: Italy
- Language: Italian

Holiday is a 2023 Italian coming-of-age drama film directed and co-written by Edoardo Gabbriellini

The film premiered in the Centrepiece program at the 2023 Toronto International Film Festival.

== Plot ==
Veronica was the subject of a lengthy trial and served two years in prison for the alleged murder of her mother and her mother's lover. She is declared innocent and released from prison just before her 20th birthday. In a small town on the Ligurian Riviera, Veronica searches for a new lease on life after having her young adult life put on hold. Supported by her friend Giada and her father, Veronica maintains her innocence, but her newfound public notoriety presents challenges.

== Cast ==
- Margherita Corradi as Veronica
- Giorgia Frank as Giada
- Alessandro Tedeschi as Veronica's father
- Alice Arcuri as Veronica's mother
- Alessia Giuliani as Simona
- Flavio Furno as Public Prosecutor
- Massimo Mesciulam as Lieutenant
- Alessio De Persio as Defense Attorney
- Alessio Raffaghelli as Nicola Guarneri
- Francesca Maselli as Giada's Mother
- Anna Argenti as Friend
- Asia Spina as Friend

== Production ==
Edoardo Gabbriellini wrote the film's screenplay with Carlo Salsa. It is based on a story by Gabbriellini, Salsa and Michele Pellegrini. It was produced by Cinemaundici and Vision Distribution, in collaboration with The Apartment Pictures and Frenesy Film Company.

== Release ==
Holiday was selected to be screened in the Centrepiece program at the 48th Toronto International Film Festival, where it had its world premiere on 8 September 2023. It was also invited at the 18th Rome Film Festival, where it was screened in October 2023.

Europictures distributed the film in a "special event" at cinemas only on 23, 24, and 25 October 2023.
