= Ketticè =

2026 Italian drama film

- Theatrical release poster
- Directed by: Giovanni Tortorici
- Written by: Giovanni Tortorici
- Produced by: Luca Guadagnino; Marco Morabito; Agustina Costa Varsi; Annamaria Morelli; Francesco Melzi D'Eril; Gabriele Moratti; Massimiliano Orfei; Luisa Borella; Davide Novell
- Starring: Salvatore Gallina; Rachele Testagrossa; Monica Bellucci
- Cinematography: Camilla Cattabriga
- Edited by: Marco Costa
- Production companies: Frenesy Film Company; The Apartment Pictures; MeMo Films; PiperFilm; Rai Cinema; First Picture
- Distributed by: PiperFilm; Warner Bros. Pictures
- Release dates: 8 August 2026 (Locarno); 3 September 2026 (Italy)
- Running time: 107 minutes
- Country: Italy
- Language: Italian
- Box office: $129,312

Ketticè is a 2026 Italian drama film written and directed by Giovanni Tortorici. It stars Salvatore Gallina, Rachele Testagrossa and Monica Bellucci.

The film had its world premiere at the main competition of the 79th Locarno Film Festival on 8 August 2026, where Bellucci won the Pardo for Best Performance. It was released in Italy by Piper Film on 3 September 2026.

== Premise ==
Giulio, a dissatisfied 16-year-old, encounters Ketty, forming a friendship and offering him an escape.

== Cast ==
- Salvatore Gallina as Giulio
- Rachele Testagrossa as Ketty
- Monica Bellucci as Giulio's mother

== Production ==
In July 2025, it was announced Salvatore Gallina, Rachele Testagrossa and Monica Bellucci had joined the cast of the film, with Giovanni Tortorici directing from a screenplay he wrote, and Luca Guadagnino among the producers.

== Release ==
It had its world premiere at the 79th Locarno Film Festival on 8 August 2026, and is scheduled to be released in Italy on 3 September 2026, by Piper Film.

In October 2026, it will compete at the 2026 BFI London Film Festival in official competition.
