= Salvatore: Shoemaker of Dreams =

2020 documentary film

- U.S theatrical release poster
- Directed by: Luca Guadagnino
- Written by: Dana Thomas
- Produced by: Francesco Melzi d'Eril; Gabriele Moratti
- Narrated by: Michael Stuhlbarg
- Cinematography: Clarissa Cappellani; Stefano Di Leo; Lucas Gath; Massimiliano Kuveiller
- Edited by: Walter Fasano
- Production companies: MeMo Films; Frenesy Film Company
- Distributed by: Lucky Red (Italy); Sony Pictures Classics (International)
- Release dates: September 5, 2020 (Venice); November 4, 2022 (United States)
- Running time: 120 minutes
- Country: Italy
- Language: English
- Box office: $138,030

Salvatore: Shoemaker of Dreams is a 2020 Italian English-language documentary film directed by Luca Guadagnino. It revolves around the life of Salvatore Ferragamo.

It had its world premiere at the Venice Film Festival on September 5, 2020. It was released in the United States on November 4, 2022.

== Production ==
In January 2019, it was announced Guadagnino would direct a documentary revolving around the life of Salvatore Ferragamo. In March 2020, Guadagnino stated the film was in post-production.

== Release ==
The film had its world premiere at the Venice Film Festival on September 5, 2020. Prior to its premiere, Sony Pictures Classics acquired worldwide distribution rights to the film, excluding Italy. They released the film in the United States on November 4, 2022.
