= Artificial (2026 film) =

2026 film by Luca Guadagnino

- Theatrical release poster
- Directed by: Luca Guadagnino
- Written by: Simon Rich
- Produced by: Simon Rich; David Heyman; Jeffrey Clifford; Jennifer Fox; Luca Guadagnino
- Starring: Andrew Garfield; Yura Borisov; Monica Barbaro; Cooper Hoffman; Jason Schwartzman; Chris O'Dowd; Ike Barinholtz; Mark Rylance
- Cinematography: Malik Hassan Sayeed
- Edited by: Marco Costa
- Music by: Damon Albarn
- Production companies: Heyday Films; JF Films; Frenesy Film Company
- Distributed by: Neon
- Release dates: October 5, 2026 (NYFF); December 25, 2026 (United States); January 22, 2027 (United Kingdom)
- Running time: 140 minutes
- Countries: Italy; United Kingdom; United States
- Language: English
- Budget: $40 million

Artificial is a 2026 biographical comedy-drama film directed and co-produced by Luca Guadagnino and written by Simon Rich. The film stars Andrew Garfield and Yura Borisov as OpenAI CEO Sam Altman and co-founder Ilya Sutskever, respectively. Its plot follows the rise of OpenAI, culminating in Sutskever's involvement in the controversial firing and rehiring of Altman in 2023. The supporting cast features Monica Barbaro, Cooper Hoffman, Jason Schwartzman, Chris O'Dowd, Ike Barinholtz, and Mark Rylance.

Artificial premiered at the 2026 New York Film Festival on October 5. A limited theatrical release by Neon is scheduled for December 25, 2026 in the United States, followed by a wide release on January 8, 2027. The film received positive reviews from critics.

== Cast ==
- Andrew Garfield as Sam Altman, the CEO of OpenAI
- Yura Borisov as Ilya Sutskever, the chief scientific officer and co-founder of OpenAI who fires Altman
- Monica Barbaro as Mira Murati, the chief technology officer of OpenAI
- Cooper Hoffman as Greg Brockman, the board chairman of OpenAI
- Jason Schwartzman as Zeke
- Chris O'Dowd as John
- Ike Barinholtz as Elon Musk, co-founder of OpenAI
- Mark Rylance as Geoffrey Hinton, a cognitive psychologist and computer scientist widely known as the "Godfather of AI"
- Zosia Mamet as Tasha McCauley
- Cooper Koch as Patrick
- Billie Lourd as Helen Toner, one of the board members of OpenAI to fire Altman
- Angus Imrie as Adam D'Angelo, one of the board members of OpenAI to fire Altman
- Nicholas Hamilton as Ollie, Altman's partner
- Thaddea Graham as Alyssa
- Will Angus as Dario Amodei, former vice president of OpenAI
- Will Price as Sam Teller
- Fedor Fedotov as Alex Krizhevsky

Additionally, Guadagnino and Jonathan Anderson make cameo appearances as two "straight cameramen".

== Production ==
=== Development ===
In January 2024, Simon Rich pitched Amazon MGM Studios about a film idea about generative AI he had while attending a wedding in 2022 with Dan Selsam, an OpenAI researcher. Jeffrey Clifford and David Heyman then signed on as producers. Rich completed his first draft script in May 2024. Heyman recalled hesitation about the studio, saying: "There were conversations around the fact that Amazon was Amazon. But they readily embraced it."

In June 2025, it was reported that Guadagnino would direct the film for Amazon MGM Studios from a screenplay by Rich, with Rich as a producer alongside David Heyman, Jeffrey Clifford, and Jennifer Fox, and a cast led by Andrew Garfield, Monica Barbaro, and Yura Borisov. In July, Cooper Koch, Cooper Hoffman, and Jason Schwartzman joined the cast, with Ike Barinholtz as Elon Musk. (Note: Attributed to multiple sources:) Billie Lourd, Zosia Mamet, Chris O'Dowd, Will Angus, Thaddea Graham, Nicholas Hamilton, Angus Imrie, and Will Price were added to the cast the next month. (Note: Attributed to multiple sources:) Mark Rylance was added to the cast in September. Jonathan Anderson served as costume designer, marking his third collaboration with Guadagnino.

=== Filming ===
Principal photography began on July 30, 2025, in San Francisco at Mission Dolores Park and continued in Italy, in Turin and Bologna. Malik Hassan Sayeed was the director of photography, marking his second collaboration with Guadagnino after After the Hunt (2025). Sayeed shot Artificial on 35mm film. Some footage in the film was captured outside Altman's home, where at one point Altman claims Garfield waved to him while in costume; Garfield later denied this claim. Filming wrapped in September.

=== Music ===
Damon Albarn, the main vocalist and lyricist of the British band Blur and co-creator of the British virtual band Gorillaz, composed the soundtrack and provided original songs for the film, his first collaboration with Guadagnino. (Note: Attributed to multiple sources:)

== Release ==
=== Distribution ===
Amazon MGM Studios was the original distributor worldwide and was reported in 2026 to have been aiming to release the film in the United States in early 2027, before opting to drop the film. The move received scrutiny for happening several days after Amazon signed a $50-billion deal with OpenAI. Amazon said the film would chart better if it was released by other studios, but Variety speculated that Amazon withdrew because of the film's unsympathetic portrayals of Altman and Musk. Altman denied any involvement in Amazon MGM's decision to drop the film. By June 2026, producers were shopping the film to other distributors while it was in post-production.

According to The New York Times, Guadagnino was shocked by the decision, as Amazon had been supportive of the film until then. The film was screened for other distributors, including A24, Focus Features, Netflix, Neon, and Warner Bros. Clockwork. Every studio but Neon passed, with Mubi also named as a prospective buyer. According to Page Six Hollywood, test scores were underwhelming and the Creative Artists Agency (CAA) screenings were not particularly favorable; sources close to the companies suggested that it was a question of taste, with some simply not liking the project. By contrast, Variety reported that test screenings went "very positively". By June 30, despite speculation that Mubi would likely acquire the film, it was reported that Neon was nearing a deal for it instead. Shortly thereafter, Neon confirmed its acquisition of the film's worldwide rights, planning to release it during awards season later in 2026. Some close to the film say Neon is bullish on its awards prospects, believing it "should at least feature in the awards conversation".

In July 2026, Page Six Hollywood reported that Neon had agreed to a deal on the condition that no minimum guarantee be attached to it. Deadline later reported that the film is expected to skip the fall film festival rollout. According to the report, "multiple A-list festivals" were interested in the film, but Neon believed that was not the right route for it. The next day, Screen Daily reported that its outlet had asked distributors who considered buying the film what they actually thought of it. "The purported controversy had no impact", said one, referring to the initial belief that the film might be too much to handle after Amazon MGM Studios dropped it. The source, connected to one of the studios that viewed the film at CAA-organized screenings, said it had to do with the film's quality: "The film was viewed exclusively on its merits as a film. Unfortunately, it's dull, ponderous and another misfire from Luca. Its poor test scores and rejection from other buyers also reflect that." Sources at other studios that screened the film seemed divided on its merits; some called it "mediocre", saying it offered no new information about the saga or the billionaire protagonists.

Picturehouse Entertainment will handle the film's British and Irish theatrical distribution in conjunction with Neon, setting a release date of January 22, 2027.

=== Theatrical release ===
According to Venice Film Festival director Alberto Barbera, Neon will be ready to release the film in wide release in early 2027, with a late December limited qualifying run planned. He said the studio needed time to arrange international sales, and that they did not want to premiere the film at Venice before selling it worldwide. Barbera said its absence from the festival lineup was due to timing and distribution issues rather than lack of interest, calling it "a straight commercial release". But on September 1, it was announced that the film would premiere in the Main Slate of the 2026 New York Film Festival on October 5, followed by a Gala screening at 2026 BFI London Film Festival on October 11. In September, the official release date was announced as December 25. The film will be released in the United Kingdom on January 22, 2027.

After watching the film's trailer, Altman said it looked like an "awful movie", though he acknowledged that Garfield accurately captured his distinctive walk and mannerisms. (Note: Attributed to multiple sources:) He also said he believed the film's depiction of him would be inaccurate.

== Reception ==
=== Critical response ===
On the review aggregator website Rotten Tomatoes, 95% of 43 critics' reviews are positive, with an average rating of 7.6/10. Metacritic, which uses a weighted average, assigned the film a score of 75 out of 100, based on 21 critics, indicating "generally favorable" reviews.

Owen Gleiberman of Variety gave the film a positive review, calling it a "brilliant but playful docudrama" and comparing it favorably to The Social Network (2010). He praised Guadagnino's direction, Rich's screenplay, and the performances, particularly those of Garfield and Borisov, describing the latter's as a potential "performance of the year". Gleiberman noted the film's portrayal of the ethical dilemmas surrounding artificial intelligence and commended its ability to make the technology's implications accessible and emotionally resonant while conveying the dangers of its rapid development. He also praised the supporting performances of Hoffman, Barbaro, Rylance, and Schwartzman, as well as Albarn's musical score.

For RogerEbert.com, Godfrey Cheshire called the film "brilliant" and "scary". He highlighted Borisov's portrayal of Sutskever as the film's most focused and realistic performance, while describing Garfield's Altman as a gifted but duplicitous leader and a "quasi-sociopath". He commended the film's atmosphere and narrative momentum, as well as its exploration of how personality, ego, and competing interests shape the development of AI, concluding that it was potentially Guadagnino's best work. David Fear of Rolling Stone likewise called the film as a terrifying portrayal of the rise of AI. He praised Borisov's portrayal of Sutskever and called Garfield's "wild swerve of a performance" a daring interpretation that occasionally risked veering into caricature. He also praised the supporting performances, particularly those of Barinholtz and Hoffman.

Stephanie Zacharek of Time called Artificial "a hugely entertaining movie about despair for the future". She praised Guadagnino's direction for balancing its ominous subject matter with humor, and commended Garfield's portrayal of Altman as both hilarious and unsettling. Zacharek also praised the cinematography by Malik Hassan Sayeed, describing its visual style as vibrant and its tone as closer to a teen comedy than a conventional prestige drama.

=== Accolades ===
Award	Date of ceremony	Category	Nominee(s)	Result	Ref.
Hollywood Music in Media Awards	November 18, 2026	Best Original Score – Feature Film	Damon Albarn	Nominated	
Gotham Independent Film Awards	November 30, 2026	Outstanding Supporting Performance	Andrew Garfield	Pending	
Palm Springs International Film Festival	January 7, 2027	Spotlight Award	Andrew Garfield	Honored	(Note: The award ceremony is yet to take place, although Garfield has already been announced as an honoree.)
