= The Staggering Girl =

2019 Italian short film

- Official poster
- Directed by: Luca Guadagnino
- Written by: Michael Mitnick
- Based on: Valentino haute couture by Pierpaolo Piccioli
- Produced by: Luca Guadagnino; Pierpaolo Piccioli; Eleonora Pratelli
- Starring: Mia Goth; Marthe Keller; Kyle MacLachlan; KiKi Layne; Julianne Moore; Alba Rohrwacher
- Cinematography: Sayombhu Mukdeeprom
- Edited by: Walter Fasano
- Music by: Ryuichi Sakamoto
- Production companies: Frenesy Film Company; Rai Cinema; Ibla Film; Valentino
- Release dates: May 17, 2019 (Cannes); February 15, 2020
- Running time: 35 minutes
- Country: Italy
- Languages: English; Italian; German

The Staggering Girl is a 2019 short film directed by Luca Guadagnino. The film was produced in collaboration with Valentino creative director Pierpaolo Piccioli. It was written by Michael Mitnick and stars Julianne Moore, Mia Goth, KiKi Layne, Kyle MacLachlan, Marthe Keller and Alba Rohrwacher.

It had its world premiere at the Cannes Film Festival in the Directors Fortnight section on May 17, 2019. It was released on February 15, 2020, by Mubi.

== Plot ==
Francesca Moretti is an Italian-American writer living in New York. She is the daughter of a famous Italian painter, Sofia Moretti, who now lives in Rome and is suffering from blindness and aging-related frailty. When Francesca learns that her mother’s condition is worsening, she reluctantly decides to return to Italy, revisiting painful memories from her past.

As Francesca navigates her journey, the film blurs the boundaries between reality, dream, and memory. She recalls moments from her youth, particularly her relationship with her mother, a demanding but brilliant artist. These recollections are interwoven with surreal encounters and fragmented emotions, creating a dreamlike atmosphere.

As Francesca reconnects with her mother, their tense relationship is rekindled. Sofia’s blindness serves as both a literal and metaphorical symbol of her inability to see Francesca for who she truly is. Francesca’s return forces her to confront not only her mother’s legacy but also her own uncertainties about her identity, art, and life choices.

The film concludes ambiguously, with Francesca caught between past and present, reality and illusion. Her journey is less about resolution and more about embracing the fragmented, emotional nature of memory.

== Cast ==
- Julianne Moore as Francesca Moretti
- Marthe Keller as Sofia Moretti
  - Mia Goth as young Sofia
- KiKi Layne as Adut
- Kyle MacLachlan as Matteo / Bruno / Angelo
- Alba Rohrwacher as Vera

== Production ==
In January 2019, it was announced Julianne Moore, Mia Goth, KiKi Layne, Kyle MacLachlan, Marthe Keller and Alba Rohrwacher had joined the cast of the film, with Luca Guadagnino directing from a screenplay by Michael Mitnick.

=== Filming ===
Principal photography began in November 2018.

== Release ==
The film had its world première at the Cannes Film Festival in the Directors Fortnight section on May 17, 2019. Shortly after, Mubi acquired distribution rights excluding Italy, China, Japan, Russia and theatrical rights in Turkey to the film. It was released on February 15, 2020.

== Reception ==
Review aggregator Rotten Tomatoes identified 29% of seven critic reviews as positive, with an average rating of 3.8/10.
