= Fiori, Fiori, Fiori =

2020 Italian short film

- Directed by: Luca Guadagnino
- Written by: Luca Guadagnino
- Produced by: Luca Guadagnino
- Starring: Luca Guadagnino; Maria Continella; Natalia Simeti; Claudio Gioè; David Kajganich
- Cinematography: Alessio Bolzoni
- Edited by: Walter Fasano
- Music by: Cosmo
- Production company: Frenesy Film Company
- Release date: September 5, 2020 (Venice)
- Running time: 12 minutes
- Country: Italy
- Languages: English; Italian

Fiori, Fiori, Fiori! is a 2020 Italian short film, written, produced, narrated and directed by Luca Guadagnino. It stars Maria Continella, Natalia Simeti, Claudio Gioè and David Kajganich.

It had its world premiere at the Venice Film Festival on September 5, 2020.

== Plot ==
During the lockdown for the COVID-19 pandemic, the movie director Luca Guadagnino, with the help of a small crew, comes down to Sicily from Milan armed only with a smartphone and a tablet, to knock on the doors of his childhood friends and understand with them how they lived this exceptional moment that united the whole world.

== Cast ==
- Maria Continella
- Natalia Simeti
- Claudio Gioè
- David Kajganich
