= Sayombhu Mukdeeprom =

Thai cinematographer (born 1970)

- สยมภู มุกดีพร้อม
- Born: 1970 (age 55–56); Bangkok, Thailand
- Education: Communication Arts Chulalongkorn University
- Years active: 2000–present

Sayombhu Mukdeeprom (Thai: สยมภู มุกดีพร้อม, RTGS: Sayomphu Mukdiphrom; born 1970) is a Thai cinematographer, best known for his collaborations with Apichatpong Weerasethakul and Luca Guadagnino.

== Filmography ==
=== Feature films ===
Year	Title	Director	Notes
2002	Blissfully Yours	Apichatpong Weerasethakul	
2003	Sayew	Kongdej Jaturanrasamee; Kiat Songsanant	
2005	Midnight My Love	Kongdej Jaturanrasamee	
2006	Noo Hin: The Movie	Komgrit Triwimol	
2006	Syndromes and a Century	Apichatpong Weerasethakul	
2007	Me... Myself	Pongpat Wachirabunjong	
2008	Soi Cowboy	Thomas Clay	
2009	Bitter Sweet	Jeff Hare	
2010	Uncle Boonmee Who Can Recall His Past Lives	Apichatpong Weerasethakul	
2011	Hellgate	John Penney	
2012	The Gangster	Kongkiat Khomsiri	
2015	Antonia	Ferdinando Cito Filomarino	
2015	Arabian Nights	Miguel Gomes	
2017	Call Me by Your Name	Luca Guadagnino	
2018	Suspiria	Luca Guadagnino	
2021	Beckett	Ferdinando Cito Filomarino	
2021	Memoria	Apichatpong Weerasethakul	
2022	Thirteen Lives	Ron Howard	
2023	Finally Dawn	Saverio Costanzo	
2024	Challengers	Luca Guadagnino	
2024	Grand Tour	Miguel Gomes	With Gui Liang and Rui Poças
2024	Trap	M. Night Shyamalan	
2024	Queer	Luca Guadagnino	
2026	The Color of the Sun	Xavier Tera	
2027	Jenjira's Magnificent Dream	Apichatpong Weerasethakul	Post-production
2027	The Catch †	Dave McCary	Post-production

=== Documentary film ===
Year	Title	Director	Notes
2000	Mysterious Object at Noon	Apichatpong Weerasethakul	With Prasong Klimborron
2026	Joie de vivre	Luca Guadagnino	With Simone D'Arcangelo

== Awards and nominations ==
- 2007: Nominated – Asian Film Awards: Best Cinematographer - Sang sattawat
- Suphannahong National Film Awards: Outstanding Achievement in Cinematography

2008: Chaiya
2009: Happy Birthday
2011: Uncle Boonmee Who Can Recall His Past Lives
2014: Ruedoo ron nan chan tai

- 2010: Won – Dubai International Film Festival: Best Cinematographer - Feature - Uncle Boonmee Who Can Recall His Past Lives
- 2017: Nominated – Critics' Choice Movie Awards: Best Cinematography - Call Me by Your Name
- 2017: Won – Independent Spirit Awards: Best Cinematography - Call Me by Your Name
- 2018: Won – Independent Spirit Awards: Best Cinematography - Suspiria
- 2022: Honoured – Robby Müller Award: Image maker award at 51st International Film Festival Rotterdam
