= The Landlords (film) =

- Directed by: Edoardo Gabbriellini
- Written by: Edoardo Gabbriellini; Valerio Mastandrea
- Starring: Valerio Mastandrea; Elio Germano; Gianni Morandi; Valeria Bruni Tedeschi
- Cinematography: Daria D'Antonio
- Edited by: Walter Fasano
- Music by: Cesare Cremonini
- Release date: 2012
- Running time: 90 min
- Country: Italy
- Language: Italian

The Landlords (Italian: Padroni di casa, also known as Homeowners) is a 2012 Italian comedy-drama film directed by Edoardo Gabbriellini. It entered the competition at the 2012 Locarno International Film Festival.

== Plot ==
Cosimo and Elia are two tilers from Rome commissioned by the singer Fausto Mieli to repaving the terrace of his house. A very successful singer, Fausto has chosen to retire from the stage following a serious illness of his wife Moira, who uses to a wheelchair. Despite the great displays of affection, it is clear that there is something wrong between Fausto and Moira. The couple lives withdrawn from the world in an apparently paradisaical corner of the Tuscan-Emilian Apennines. To support tourism promotion, Fausto agreed to return to perform in public. Despite being brothers, Cosimo and Elia are profoundly different. The first, who is the older brother, has difficult stories behind him that have marked him deeply while the second, while loving his brother, suffers his presence as a limit. The small community immediately welcomes the two brothers with great distrust, like two foreigners. And if Elia tries to behave in an extremely professional manner, Cosimo cannot help but succumb to the charm of the star Fausto Mieli. Little by little, the mistrust between the two brothers and the rest of the village intensifies. Elia starts dating a local girl, triggering the jealousy of a boy who courts her. Cosimo, on the other hand, misunderstanding a compliment from Fausto, clashes with his client. To calm the ensuing humiliation he goes to the village bar and drinks more than he should. Meanwhile, as the day of the concert and Fausto's great return approaches, Elia and Cosimo's work is far from finished. Tensions between the singer and his immobilized wife escalate, just like the conflicts between the two brothers and the rest of the country. And when Cosimo involuntarily witnesses something that he shouldn't have seen, the reactions of the hosts are no longer delayed.

== Cast ==
- Valerio Mastandrea: Cosimo
- Elio Germano: Elia
- Gianni Morandi: Fausto Mieli
- Valeria Bruni Tedeschi: Moira Mieli
- Francesca Rabbi: Adriana

== See also ==
- List of Italian films of 2012
