= Marco Morabito =

Italian producer and editor (born 1997)

- Born: 4 November 1969 (age 56); Rome
- Occupations: Producer, Editor, Cinematographer
- Years active: 1997 – present
- Known for: Producing Call Me By Your Name
- Children: 1

Marco Morabito is an Italian producer, best known for producing the film Call Me by Your Name, for which he was co-nominated for the Academy Award for Best Picture at the 90th Academy Awards. He is best known for producing auteur-driven films in collaboration with his long-standing creative partner and close friend, director Luca Guadagnino. Over the course of his career, Marco Morabito has received multiple accolades, including honors from the Critics' Choice Awards, the American Film Institute (AFI), and the Independent Spirit Awards and more. As of 2023, his net worth is estimated to be approximately $11.5 million.

== Filmography ==
Producer

- 2026: Ketticè (producer)
- 2024: Diciannove (producer)
- 2019: The Staggering Girl (short film) (producer)
- 2018: Suspiria (producer)
- 2017: Call Me by Your Name (producer)
- 2015: A Bigger Splash (executive producer)
- 2015: Antonia. (producer)
- 2012: The Landlords (producer)
- 2010: Diarchy (Short) (producer)
- 2009: I Am Love (producer)
- 2004: Arto Lindsay Perdoa a Beleza (The Love Factory Series) (Documentary short) (producer)
- 2004: Cuoco contadino (Documentary) (producer)
- 2002: Tilda Swinton: The Love Factory (Documentary short) (producer)

Editor

- 2007: Part deux (Short)
- 2005: Being Claudia Cardinale (TV Movie documentary)
- 2005: Briciole (TV Movie)
- 2004: Cuoco contadino (Documentary)
- 2004: Il produttore (Short)
- 2003: Lotus (Video documentary)

Cinematographer

- 2001: Another World Is Possible (Documentary)
