= After the Hunt =

2025 film by Luca Guadagnino

- Theatrical release poster
- Directed by: Luca Guadagnino
- Written by: Nora Garrett
- Produced by: Brian Grazer; Jeb Brody; Allan Mandelbaum; Luca Guadagnino
- Starring: Julia Roberts; Ayo Edebiri; Andrew Garfield; Michael Stuhlbarg; Chloë Sevigny
- Cinematography: Malik Hassan Sayeed
- Edited by: Marco Costa
- Music by: Trent Reznor; Atticus Ross
- Production companies: Imagine Entertainment; Frenesy Film Company; Potboiler
- Distributed by: Amazon MGM Studios (United States and Canada); Sony Pictures Releasing International (International)
- Release dates: August 29, 2025 (Venice); October 10, 2025 (United States)
- Running time: 139 minutes
- Countries: Italy; United States
- Language: English
- Budget: $70–80 million
- Box office: $9.5 million

After the Hunt is a 2025 psychological thriller film directed by Luca Guadagnino and written by Nora Garrett. It stars Julia Roberts as Alma, a college professor caught in a sexual abuse accusation involving one of her students (Ayo Edebiri) and a colleague (Andrew Garfield). The cast also features Michael Stuhlbarg and Chloë Sevigny.

After the Hunt premiered out of competition in the 82nd Venice International Film Festival on August 29, 2025, and was theatrically released in the United States by Amazon MGM Studios on October 10. It received mixed reviews from critics, though Roberts's performance was praised. The film was a box-office bomb, grossing $9.5 million on a $70–80 million production budget.

== Plot ==
In September 2019, Yale philosophy professor Alma Imhoff and her therapist husband Frederik Mendelssohn host a dinner party. Alma recently returned to her post after an extended medical leave; she is prescribed medication for chronic pain. In attendance are Hank Gibson, Alma's colleague and best friend, and Maggie Resnick, her top PhD student.

Alma and Hank are both up for tenure. Maggie finds an envelope in Alma's guest bathroom containing old mementos, pocketing a newspaper clipping she sees. Frederik privately opines to Alma that Hank and Maggie are unremarkable and she is only drawn to them because they admire her. Hank walks Maggie home.

Maggie is absent from Alma's class the next day. That evening, she appears at Alma's, saying that Hank sexually assaulted her after inviting him in for a nightcap. As Alma is insufficiently supportive, she leaves. Shortly afterwards, Alma confronts Hank who denies the allegation and claims Maggie is fabricating the assault after he had discovered her dissertation was plagiarized and confronted her.

Alma further upsets Maggie by speaking to the dean without her permission. Both she and Hank covertly ask her for her support. Alma finds the newspaper clipping is missing from the envelope, then burns the rest. Hank is fired the next day, so storms into Alma's classroom, accusing her of not protecting him to protect herself. Hank bursts out, and Maggie leaves too.

Alma comforts Maggie, inviting her to dinner. Maggie tells her a reporter asked her about the allegation. The following day, Alma goes for drinks with psychiatrist colleague Dr. Kim Sayers, who supports Maggie, while disapproving of how students treat their problems.

Maggie makes her allegations public in the Yale Daily News. Translating the German-language newspaper clipping, she learns the teenaged Alma accused her father's friend Matthias Wolff of raping her, but later recanted. Maggie asks if this is why she reacted as she did to her allegation. Angry she violated her privacy, Alma tells Maggie to leave her alone.

Alma is caught forging a prescription for herself from Kim, so her tenure is paused indefinitely. Afterwards, she confronts Maggie on campus, accusing her of plagiarism, criticizing her work ethic, her mirroring of Alma's mannerisms and dress, her privilege as the child of wealthy Yale donors, and suggests that she is in a performative relationship with her non-binary partner, Alex. Alma further insinuates that no one believes Maggie's allegation against Hank, prompting Maggie to slap her.

Alma retreats to her wharfside vacation apartment and finds Hank sleeping there, having kept the borrowed keys that she had lent his sister for a past visit. Both wounded from recent events, they discuss Hank's behavior. While he acknowledges flirting with his students, he again denies he raped Maggie or ever had sex with students. Hank insists the only professional boundary he ever crossed was their past affair, and he still harbors feelings for her. Sharing a tender kiss, he then attempts to push sex, despite Alma repeatedly saying no. Finally, she shoves him, expulsing him from the apartment.

Alma returns to campus the next day, unaware of Rolling Stone's published article in which Maggie heavily criticizes her and Yale's handling of Maggie coming forward. Alex and a group of other student protestors confront Alma, who collapses as her stomach ulcers perforate.

In the hospital, Alma tells Frederik the truth about her teenaged sexual assault, of which he knows few details. At 15, she initiated a romantic sexual relationship with the older Wolff. When he ended it to be with a woman his age, she fabricated a rape allegation against him, which she later recanted, but which ultimately led to his suicide. Frederik points out that even if she feels responsible, it was still statutory rape. When she confesses that she still loves Wolff, Frederik says he loves her, and she does not reciprocate.

In a January 2025 epilogue, Alma is now a dean, having restored her career with an article about her teenaged experience of statutory rape. Meeting Maggie at a diner—their first since the earlier events, they discuss their lives. Alma tells Maggie that Hank now has a lucrative, political consultant job for the Democratic Party. She is still with Frederik, while Maggie is engaged. Maggie comments that Alma's article was cynical but smart, that Alma "won", then she leaves. As Alma pays and leaves, Luca Guadagnino yells "cut!" off-screen.

== Cast ==
- Julia Roberts as Alma Imhoff, a respected, well-liked professor at Yale University
- Ayo Edebiri as Margaret "Maggie" Resnick, a young philosophy student and Alma's protégée
- Andrew Garfield as Henrik "Hank" Gibson, Alma's colleague and close friend, who is accused of assault
- Michael Stuhlbarg as Frederik Mendelssohn, Alma's psychiatrist husband
- Chloë Sevigny as Dr. Kim Sayers, the university's student liaison and Alma's friend
- Thaddea Graham as Katie
- David Leiber as Dean RJ Thomas
- Lío Mehiel as Alex, a law student and Maggie's partner
- Will Price as Arthur

== Production ==
Nora Garrett's screenplay was originally voted onto the Black List in 2023, an annual survey of the "most-liked" motion picture screenplays not yet produced. In March 2024, it was announced that Julia Roberts was set to star in the film, with Luca Guadagnino set to direct. In May, Andrew Garfield and Ayo Edebiri joined the cast. Zendaya, who had worked with Guadagnino on Challengers (2024), was initially set for Edebiri's role, but dropped out due to scheduling conflicts. Guadagnino then cast Edebiri after seeing her in Bottoms (2023). Guadagnino added a racial subtext to the script that was not present in the first draft by changing Maggie Resnick from white to black. In June, Michael Stuhlbarg and Chloë Sevigny joined the cast.

Principal photography began in London and Cambridge University on July 6, 2024. The film shot on location there for a week before shooting the last five weeks on stage at Shepperton Studios. Filming wrapped on August 16, after six weeks of shooting. Cinematographer Malik Hassan Sayeed shot the project on 35 mm film, marking his return to a feature film production after 25 years. The film's costume design was done by Jonathan Anderson, the creative director of Loewe, marking his third collaboration with Guadagnino following Challengers (2024) and Queer (2024).

== Release ==
The film premiered at the 82nd Venice International Film Festival on August 29, 2025, followed by its North American premiere as the opening film of the 63rd New York Film Festival on September 26. It opened in limited release in the United States on October 10, before expanding to wide release on October 17.

It was the first film from Amazon MGM Studios to be released internationally by Sony Pictures Releasing International, following the conclusion of a three-year distribution deal with Warner Bros. Pictures.

The film has not been made available on home video or for digital purchase. It is available exclusively on Amazon Prime Video, where it premiered on November 20, 2025.

== Reception ==
=== Box office ===
After the Hunt was considered a box-office bomb. The film grossed $3.2 million in its domestic opening weekend, finishing outside the top ten. With a production budget estimated between $70–80 million, of which Roberts received $20 million, the film was projected to lose money for the studio.

=== Critical response ===
On the review aggregator website Rotten Tomatoes, 36% of 233 critics' reviews are positive, with an average rating of 5.4/10. The website's consensus reads: "After the Hunt doesn't lack for fine performances, especially from a standout Julia Roberts, but its coy followthrough on incendiary themes makes for an uncharacteristically toothless provocation from director Luca Guadagnino." Metacritic, which uses a weighted average, assigned the film a score of 52 out of 100, based on 41 critics, indicating "mixed or average" reviews. Audiences polled by CinemaScore gave the film an average grade of "C-" on an A+ to F scale.

Several critics praised Roberts' performance, calling it one of her best in years and describing it as "superb" and a "monumental center" of the entire film. Owen Gleiberman of Variety called the film an "urgent and provocative conversation piece" and noted that it was "made with a fair amount of craft and intrigue”, but said, “it's also a weirdly muddled experience; a tale that's tense and compelling at times, but dotted with contrivances and too many vague unanswered questions". Bilge Ebiri of Vulture wrote that "After the Hunt might be confused, and it might even be unsatisfying, but it also refuses to coddle anyone, and that feels like some sort of victory" because "[it] seems engineered to let each viewer see what they want in it, both the good and the bad".

In a negative review, Peter Bradshaw of The Guardian wrote that "Luca Guadagnino misfires with this bafflingly overlong, overwrought #MeToo campus accusation drama", finding Garrett's screenwriting "worryingly muddled and contrived" and the characterisations "unfocused", which penalise the cast's acting skills.

=== Accolades ===
Award	Date of ceremony	Category	Recipient(s)	Result	Ref.
AARP Movies for Grownups Awards	January 10, 2026	Best Actress	Julia Roberts	Nominated	
Black Reel Awards	February 16, 2026	Outstanding Cinematography	Malik Hassan Sayeed	Nominated	
Golden Globes	January 11, 2026	Best Performance by a Female Actor in a Motion Picture – Drama	Julia Roberts	Nominated	
Gotham Awards	December 1, 2025	Visionary Tribute	Luca Guadagnino and Julia Roberts	Honored	
NAACP Image Awards	February 28, 2026	Outstanding Writing in a Motion Picture	Nora Garrett	Nominated	
Venice Film Festival	September 6, 2025	Queer Lion	After the Hunt	Nominated	
Visual Effects Society Awards	February 25, 2026	Outstanding Supporting Visual Effects in a Photoreal Feature	Fabio Cerrito, Virginia Cefaly, Marco Fiorani Parenzi, and Maura Manfredi	Nominated	

== See also ==
- The Hunt, a 2012 Danish film about a man falsely accused of sexual assault against a child
- Post-assault treatment of sexual assault victims
