= Edoardo Gabbriellini =

Italian actor, screenwriter, and director

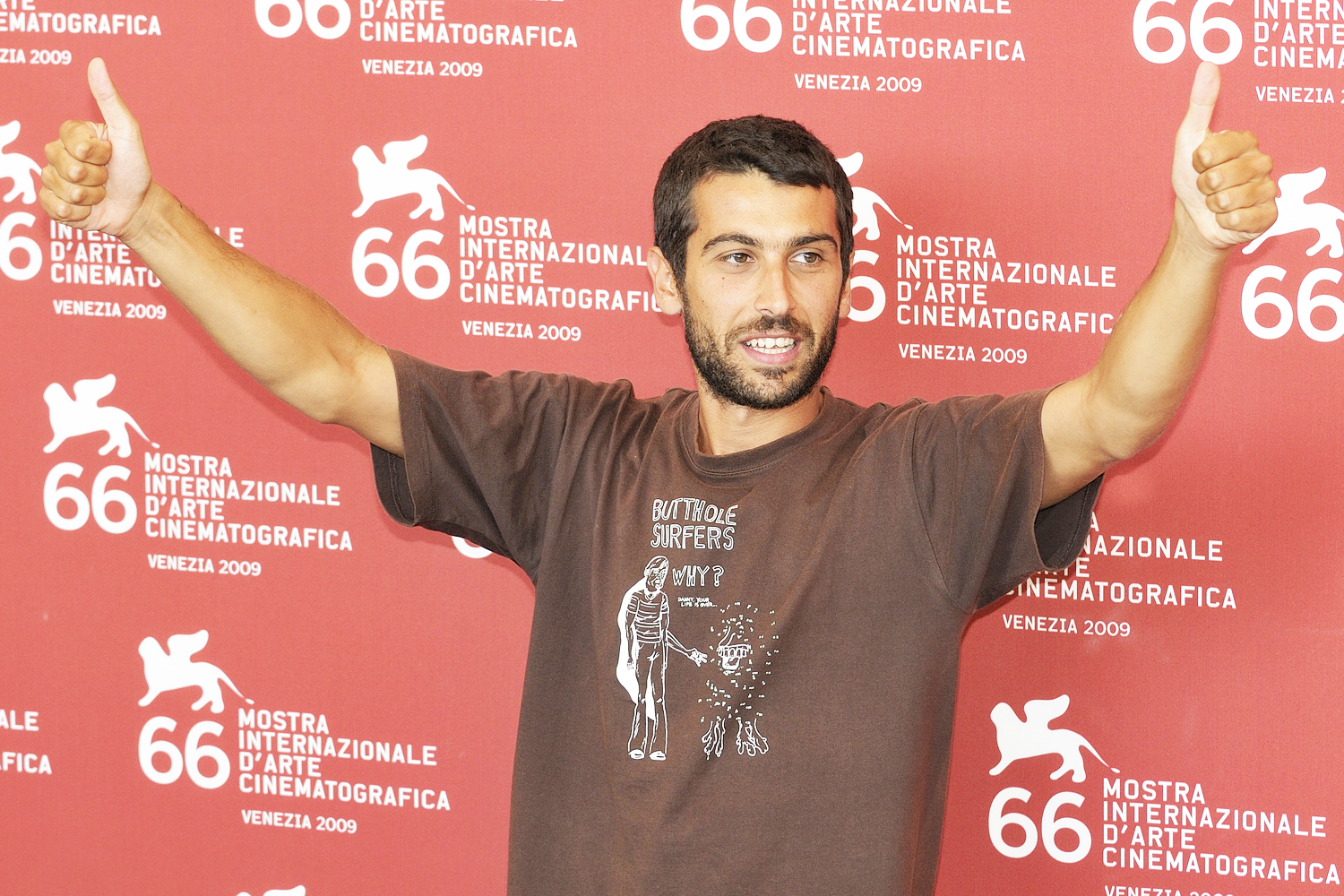
- Gabbriellini in 2009
- Born: 16 July 1975 (age 51); Livorno, Italy
- Occupations: Actor; Director; Screenwriter
- Height: 1.74 m (5 ft 9 in)

Edoardo Gabbriellini (born 16 July 1975) is an Italian actor, screenwriter, and director.

== Life and career ==
Born in Livorno, at 18 years old Gabbriellini was chosen by Paolo Virzì to star in his film Ovosodo. For his performance he won the Pasinetti Award for best actor at the 54th edition of the Venice International Film Festival, and subsequently left his studies to devote himself to acting.

After directing the music video for the song "Tre parole" by Valeria Rossi, Gabbriellini made his feature film directorial debut in 2003 with the comedy-drama B.B. e il cormorano, which was screened in the International Critics' Week section of the Cannes Film Festival.

His third feature film Holiday premiered at the 2023 Toronto International Film Festival. The film is about a 20-year-old girl who is cleared of murder charges and reunites with her best friend, still being haunted by the visions of a brutal death of her mother and her boyfriend.

== Filmography ==
=== Acting credits ===
Year	Title	Role(s)	Notes
1997	Ovosodo	Piero Mansani	
1999	Kisses and Hugs	Alessio Bacci	
2003	B.B. e il cormorano	Mario	
2003	Now or Never	Luca	
2007	Don't Think About It	Luca	
2008	The Early Bird Catches the Worm	Gianfranco Monti	
2008	Your Whole Life Ahead of You	Roberto	
2009	I Am Love	Antonio Biscaglia	
2010	Unlikely Revolutionaries	Edo	
2011	Some Say No	Saguatti	
2014	The Face of an Angel	Roberto	
2015	Banat	Ivo	
2020	Romantic Guide to Lost Places	Cristian	

==== Television ====
Year	Title	Role(s)	Notes
2006	Bartali: The Iron Man	Giulio Bartali	Television movie
2008–2009	I liceali	Filippo	Recurring role
2009	Il mostro di Firenze	Natalino Mele	Episode: "Episode 2"

=== Filmmaking credits ===
Year	Title	Notes
2003	B.B. e il cormorano	Directing debut
2012	The Landlords	
2016	Dov'è Mario	
2019	Kemp	Documentary about Lindsay Kemp
2023	Holiday	
2026	The City of the Living	
