= Antonia Pozzi =

Italian poet (1912–1938)

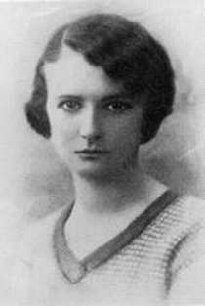
- Born: 13 February 1912 Milan, Kingdom of Italy
- Died: 3 December 1938 (aged 26) Milan, Kingdom of Italy
- Resting place: Pasturo, Province of Lecco, Italy
- Literary movement: Crepuscularism, Hermeticism

Antonia Pozzi (13 February 1912 – 3 December 1938) was an Italian poet.

== Biography ==
Antonia Pozzi was born on 13 February 1912, in Milan. She was the daughter of the lawyer Roberto Pozzi and Countess Lina Cavagna Sangiuliani di Gualdana.

She entered the Manzoni High School in 1922. She became romantically involved with her Classics teacher at the Manzoni school, Antonio Maria Cervi; the relationship ended in 1933, possibly due to her parents' intervention. In 1930, she enrolled in the Faculty of Philology of the University of Milan, where she became friends with the poet Vittorio Sereni and other writers of her own generation. In 1935, she received a degree in literature, based on a thesis about Gustave Flaubert.

She had begun writing poetry as a teenager. She kept a diary, wrote letters, and took photographs, recording her studies and travels as well as her feelings. Her home and personal library were in the family villa in Pasturo, at the foot of the Grigna mountains in Lombardy. At one point she planned to write a historical novel set in Lombardy.

In 1938, she worked at the magazine Corrente.

On 2 December 1938, following a barbiturate suicide attempt, she was found unconscious in a ditch in front of Chiaravalle Abbey, a suburb of Milan. She died the next day and was buried in the small cemetery of Pasturo. The family refused to admit it was a suicide, attributing her death to pneumonia. Antonia's will was destroyed by her father. Her poems, written in notebooks and unpublished before her death, were also heavily edited by him for publication.

Pozzi is considered to be one of the most original voices in modern Italian literature. In her lifetime she wrote 300 poems, all published after her death on 3 December 1938, aged 26. Although Pozzi did not gain recognition for her work in her own lifetime, her poems have later been published many times in Italy, and she has been translated into several languages.

== Works ==
- Parole. Liriche, Milano, Mondadori, 1939 (edizione originale postuma, con 91 poesie)
- Flaubert. La formazione letteraria (1830–1856), con una premessa di Antonio Banfi, Milano, Garzanti, 1940 (tesi di laurea).
- Parole. Diario di poesia (1930–1938), Milano, A. Mondadori, 1943 (seconda edizione, con 157 poesie).
- Parole. Diario di poesia, Prefazione di Eugenio Montale, Milano, A. Mondadori, 1948 (terza edizione, con 159 poesie); 1964 (quarta edizione, con 176 poesie).
- La vita sognata ed altre poesie inedite, a cura di Alessandra Cenni e Onorina Dino, Milano, Scheiwiller, 1986.
- Diari, a cura di Onorina Dino e Alessandra Cenni, Milano, Scheiwiller, 1988.
- L'età delle parole è finita. Lettere (1925–1938), a cura di Alessandra Cenni e Onorina Dino, Milano, R. Archinto, 1989.
- Parole, a cura di Alessandra Cenni e Onorina Dino, Milano, Garzanti, 1989.
- A. Pozzi – V. Sereni, La giovinezza che non-trova scampo. Poesie e lettere degli anni Trenta, a cura di Alessandra Cenni, Milano, Scheiwiller, 1995.
- Mentre tu dormi le stagioni passano..., a cura di Alessandra Cenni e Onorina Dino, Milano, Viennepierre, 1998.
- Poesia, mi confesso con te. Ultime poesie inedite (1929–1933), a cura di Onorina Dino, Milano, Viennepierre, 2004.
- Nelle immagini l'anima. Antologia fotografica, a cura di Ludovica Pellegatta e Onorina Dino, Milano, Àncora, 2007.
- Diari e altri scritti, Nuova edizione a cura di Onorina Dino, note ai testi e postfazione di Matteo M. Vecchio, Milano, Viennepierre, 2008.
- A. Pozzi – T. Gadenz, Epistolario (1933–1938), a cura di Onorina Dino, Milano, Viennepierre, 2008.
- Le Madri-Montagne. Poesie (1933–1938), a cura di Carla Glori, Foggia, Bastogi, 2009.
- Tutte le opere, a cura di Alessandra Cenni, Garzanti, Milano, 2009.
- Poesia che mi guardi, a cura di Graziella Bernabò e Onorina Dino, Roma, Luca Sossella, 2010.
- Guardami: sono nuda, a cura di Simona Carlesi, Firenze, Barbès, 2010.
- Soltanto in sogno. Lettere e fotografie per Dino Formaggio, a cura di Giuseppe Sandrini, Verona, Alba Pratalia, 2011.
- Poesie pasturesi, Missaglia, Bellavite, 2012.
- Flaubert. La formazione letteraria (1830–1856), a cura di Alessandra Cenni, Milano, Libri Scheiwiller, 2012.
- Lieve offerta. Poesie e prose, a cura di Alessandra Cenni e Silvio Raffo, Milano, Bietti, 2014, sec.ed. 2015
- Ti scrivo dal mio vecchio tavolo. Lettere (1919–1938), a cura di Graziella Bernabò e Onorina Dino, Milano, Àncora, 2014.
- Nel prato azzurro del cielo, a cura di Teresa Porcella, illustrazioni di Gioia Marchegiani, Firenze, Motta Junior, 2015.
- Parole. Tutte le poesie, a cura di Graziella Bernabò e Onorina Dino, Milano, Àncora, 2015.
- Le mimose di Antonia, Milano, Àncora, 2016.
- Nei sogni bisogna crederci, Napoli, Paolo Loffredo, 2016.

Biography: Alessandra Cenni, In riva alla vita, Storia di Antonia Pozzi poetessa, Milano, Rizzoli, 2001

=== Translations in other languages ===
- Tag für Tag. Ein dichterisches Vermächtnis, tr. E. Wiegand Junker, Wien, Amandus Verlag, 1952.
- Treinta poemas, tr. M. Roldán, Madrid, Rialp, 1961.
- Breath. Poems and Letters, tr. L. Venuti, Middletown, CN, Wesleyan University Press, 2002. ISBN 978-0-8195-6544-0.
- Worte, tr. S. Golisch, Salzburg-Paris, Tartin, 2005. ISBN 978-3-902163-23-3.
- Parole / Worte, tr. G. Rovagnati, Göttingen, Wallstein Verlag, 2008. ISBN 978-3-8353-0348-5.
- La route du mourir, tr. P. Reumaux, Rouen, Librairie Elisabeth Brunet, 2009. ISBN 978-2-910776-21-3.
- L' oeuvre ou la vie. «Mots», traduction et notes par Ettore Labbate, Bern, P. Lang, 2010.
- Poems, tr. P. Robinson, Richmond (London), Oneworld Classics Ltd, 2011. ISBN 978-1-84749-185-5.
- Morte de uma estação, Selecção e tradução de Inês Dias, Lisboa, Averno, 2012.
- Espaiosa tardor. Selecció i traducció Marta Nin. Godall Edicions, 2021. ISBN 978-84-123072-1-4.
- "Sunset", trans. Sonia di Placido, in Virginia's Sisters, Richmond (London), Aurora Metro Books, 2023. ISBN 9781912430789

== Photo gallery ==
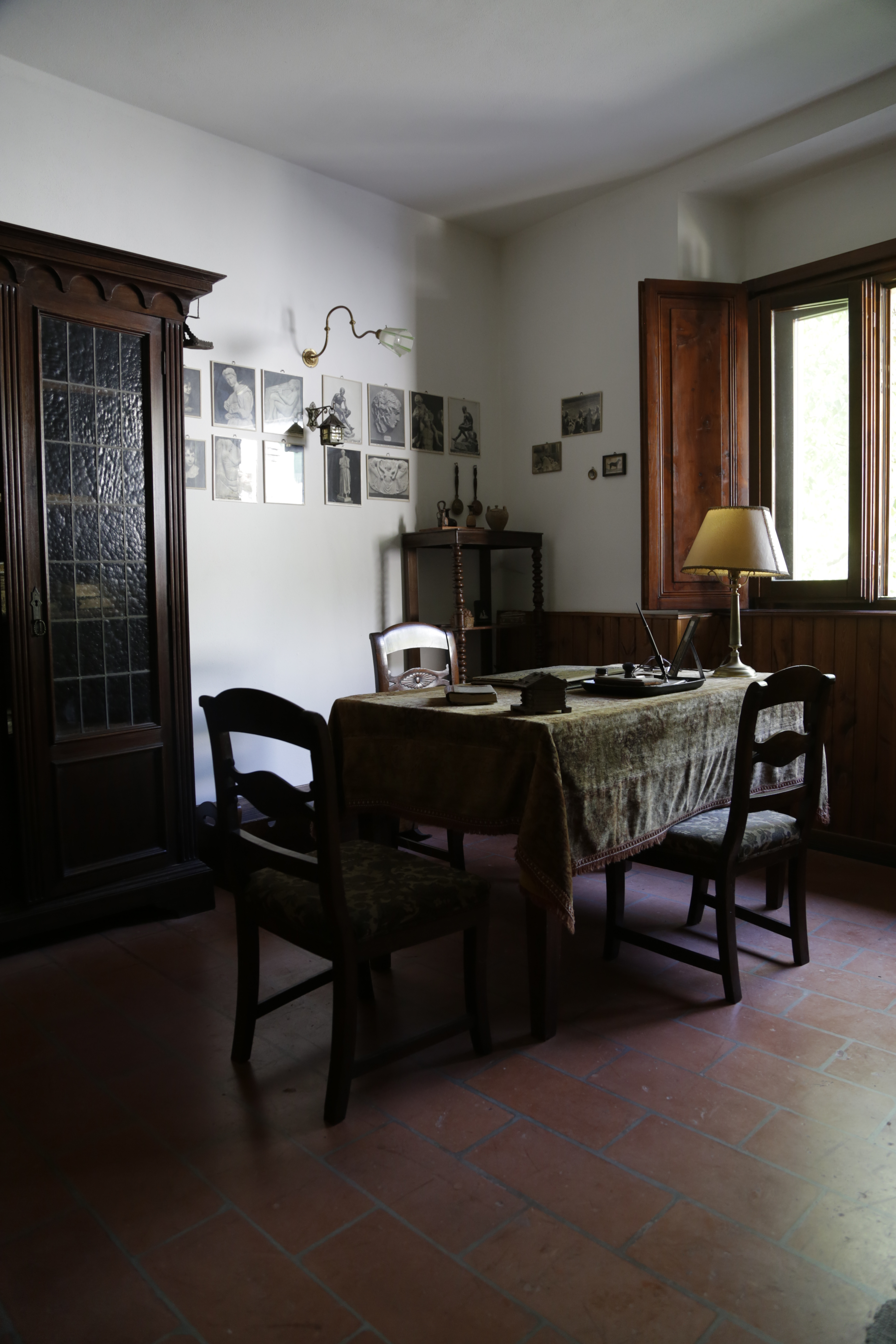
Antonia Pozzi's worktable at Villa Pozzi, in Pasturo, Lombardy
