= A Bigger Splash (2015 film) =

- Italian theatrical release poster
- Directed by: Luca Guadagnino
- Screenplay by: David Kajganich
- Story by: Alain Page
- Produced by: Michael Costigan; Luca Guadagnino
- Starring: Ralph Fiennes; Matthias Schoenaerts; Tilda Swinton; Dakota Johnson
- Cinematography: Yorick Le Saux
- Edited by: Walter Fasano
- Production companies: StudioCanal; Frenesy Film Company; Cota Film
- Distributed by: Lucky Red (Italy); StudioCanal (France); Fox Searchlight Pictures (United States)
- Release dates: 6 September 2015 (Venice); 26 November 2015 (Italy); 6 April 2016 (France); 13 May 2016 (United States)
- Running time: 124 minutes
- Countries: Italy; France; United States
- Languages: English; Italian; French
- Box office: $7.5 million

A Bigger Splash is a 2015 psychological drama film directed by Luca Guadagnino and with a screenplay by David Kajganich from a story by Alain Page. Starring Tilda Swinton, Matthias Schoenaerts, Ralph Fiennes, and Dakota Johnson, the film is loosely based on Jacques Deray's 1969 film La Piscine (The Swimming Pool) and named after the 1967 David Hockney painting.

The second installment in Guadagnino's self-described Desire trilogy, following I Am Love (2009) and preceding Call Me by Your Name (2017), the film competed for the Golden Lion at the 72nd Venice International Film Festival.

== Plot ==
In an isolated villa on the small Italian island of Pantelleria, Marianne Lane, a world-famous rock singer, is on holiday with her filmmaker lover, Paul De Smedt. She is recovering from surgery and has lost her voice, communicating only by signs and occasional whispers. Paul is in recovery from alcohol addiction and a suicide attempt. Neither speaks Italian, and their togetherness is interrupted by uninvited visitors.

Harry Hawkes is an extroverted music producer who was Marianne's lover until he passed her on to his protégé, Paul. With him is his daughter, Penelope "Pen" Lanier, who says she is 22. Moving into the villa, Harry starts inviting friends around as if it were his home and taking everybody out to various sights and festivities. His arrogant manner bores Pen and annoys Paul, but Marianne starts falling under his spell again.

However, when Harry and Marianne begin to become intimate, Marianne stops Harry. She tells him that she does love him but that she cannot be with him and that she is with Paul. The sultry Pen then makes a play for the unhappy Paul; it is implied that Paul succumbs to Pen's overtures. After drinking on his own, Harry comes back very late and starts a fight with Paul beside the pool. Both fall in, and the fight continues. Paul holds Harry underwater to subdue him, but Harry drowns.

Realising his mistake, Paul pulls Harry to the surface and attempts to resuscitate him but is unsuccessful, and he leaves Harry to drift to the bottom of the pool. In the morning, his corpse is seen by the maid, who calls the police. They have more urgent business with refugees landing from North Africa, some floating ashore dead, but take the occupants of the villa in for questioning.

Marianne convinces them with the truth that she was asleep and suggests that the murderer was an intruder. Paul lies, saying he went to bed before the time of death, and is believed. Pen eventually reveals that she can speak perfect Italian but chose to let her hosts struggle, and her passport reveals that she is only 17. Paul is concerned that Pen may have witnessed his fight with Harry in the pool but is unable to determine how much she knows, if anything. Paul tearfully admits to Marianne that he killed Harry but tried to save him.

At the airport, as Pen is about to fly out, she tells Paul and Marianne something that refers to a comment Marianne once made to Harry. Visibly disturbed, Marianne slaps Pen. Pen maintains her composure until she is shown boarding the plane in tears, unseen by Marianne and Paul, who depart in their car.

On the ride back to the villa, they are stopped by the police. It is the investigating officer, but rather than pursuing the case, he reveals himself to be a fan of Marianne’s and wants her to autograph a CD. She obliges and returns to the car, where she and Paul share their relief and drive away.

== Cast ==
- Tilda Swinton as Marianne Lane
- Matthias Schoenaerts as Paul De Smedt
- Ralph Fiennes as Harry Hawkes
- Dakota Johnson as Penelope "Pen" Lanier
- Lily McMenamy as Sylvie
- Aurore Clément as Mireille
- Elena Bucci as Clara
- Corrado Guzzanti as Maresciallo dei Carabinieri

== Marketing ==
The first promo still of A Bigger Splash featuring Matthias Schoenaerts, Tilda Swinton, Dakota Johnson and Ralph Fiennes was released on 27 July 2015. A new set of movie stills were released on 3 September 2015. The first clip was released on 5 September 2015. Swinton appeared in-character on the cover of the Autumn/Winter 2015 issue of AnOther Magazine. In a work of fiction co-authored by Swinton, Glenn O'Brien, Luca Guadagnino, and Dave Kajganich, Marianne Lane gave an interview for the magazine based around events in the film.

The first international teaser trailer was released on 1 October 2015. The second trailer was released on 5 January 2016. The second clip from the film was released on 15 January 2016. Fox Searchlight released the first U.S. trailer on 10 February 2016.

== Release ==
In February 2015, Fox Searchlight Pictures acquired U.S. distribution rights to the film. The film made its world premiere at the 72nd Venice Film Festival on 6 September 2015. It was also selected to screen at the Busan International Film Festival on 2 October 2015 and at the London Film Festival on 9 October 2015. Lucky Red released the film in Italy on 26 November 2015. The film was released in the United Kingdom on 12 February 2016 by StudioCanal. It was released in France on 6 April 2016. Originally scheduled to open in the United States on 13 May 2016, it was brought forward to 4 May.

For its theatrical release A Bigger Splash earned $2,024,099 in North America and $5,521,659 in foreign receipts for a total world box office gross of $7,545,758.

An extended version running for 195 minutes, titled An Even Bigger Splash, screened at the Gothenburg Film Festival on 5 February 2022.

== Reception ==
=== Critical response ===
A Bigger Splash received positive reviews from critics. On Rotten Tomatoes, the film has an approval rating of 89%, based on 184 reviews. The site's consensus states: "Absorbing, visually arresting, and powerfully acted by an immensely talented cast, A Bigger Splash offers sumptuously soapy delights for fans of psychological adult drama." On Metacritic the film has a score of 74 out of 100, based on 36 critics, indicating "generally favorable reviews".

=== Accolades ===
List of awards and nominations
Award	Date of ceremony	Category	Recipient(s)	Result	Ref(s)
AARP Movies for Grownups Awards	6 February 2017	Best Actress	Tilda Swinton	Nominated	
Detroit Film Critics Society	19 December 2016	Best Supporting Actor	Ralph Fiennes	Nominated	
Evening Standard British Film Awards	8 December 2016	Best Actor	Ralph Fiennes	Nominated	
Evening Standard British Film Awards	8 December 2016	Best Actress	Tilda Swinton	Nominated	
Florida Film Critics Circle	23 December 2016	Best Supporting Actor	Ralph Fiennes	Runner-up	
Independent Spirit Awards	25 February 2017	Best Supporting Male	Ralph Fiennes	Nominated	
IndieWire Critics Poll	19 December 2016	Best Supporting Actor	Ralph Fiennes	6th Place	
IndieWire Critics Poll	19 December 2016	Best Supporting Actress	Tilda Swinton	5th Place	
San Francisco Film Critics Circle	11 December 2016	Best Supporting Actor	Ralph Fiennes	Nominated	
Toronto Film Critics Association	11 December 2016	Best Supporting Actor	Ralph Fiennes	Runner-up	
Venice Film Festival	12 September 2015	Golden Lion	Luca Guadagnino	Nominated	
Venice Film Festival	12 September 2015	Green Drop Award	Luca Guadagnino	Nominated	
Venice Film Festival	12 September 2015	Soundtrack Stars Award	A Bigger Splash	Won	
Venice Film Festival	12 September 2015	Best Innovative Budget Award	Luca Guadagnino	Won	
