= Antonella Cannarozzi =

Italian costume designer

- Born: Taranto, Italy
- Occupation: Costume designer

Antonella Cannarozzi is an Italian costume designer. She was nominated for an Academy Award in the category Best Costume Design for the film I Am Love.

A student of the Brera Academy, she is best known for her collaborations with directors Saverio Costanzo, Maria Sole Tognazzi and Luca Guadagnino.

== Partial filmography ==
- To Die for Tano (1997)
- Ecco fatto (1998)
- Life Blood (2000)
- Gasoline (2001)
- Melissa P. (2005)
- Provincia meccanica (2005)
- Fast Souls (2006)
- In memoria di me (2007)
- The Man Who Loves (2008)
- Good Morning Heartache (2008)
- I Am Love (2009)
- The Solitude of Prime Numbers (2010)
- Diarchy (short) (2010)
- Missione di pace (2011)
- The Landlords (2012)
- In Treatment (2013, TV series)
- A Five Star Life (2013)
- Hungry Hearts (2014)
- Me, Myself and Her (2015)
- Pericle (2016)
- Daughter of Mine (2018)
- My Brilliant Friend (2018-2022, TV series)
- Padre Pio (2022)
- Finally Dawn (2023)

== Awards and nominations ==
| Association | Year (Note: Indicates the year of ceremony. Each year is linked to the article about the awards held that year, wherever possible.) | Category | Work | Result |
|---|---|---|---|---|
| Academy Awards | 2011 | Best Costume Design | I Am Love | Nominated |
| Ciak d'oro | 1998 | Best Costume Design | To Die for Tano | Nominated |
| Nastro d'Argento Awards | 2010 | Best Costume Design | I Am Love | Nominated |
| Nastro d'Argento Awards | 2024 | Best Costume Design | Finally Dawn | Won |
