= Vivo Film =

Italian production company

Vivo Film, established in Rome at the beginning of 2004 by Gregorio Paonessa and Marta Donzelli, is an Italian independent production company for art-house films.

Vivo Film's productions include works by Laura Bispuri, Andrea De Sica, Guido Chiesa, Jean-Louis Comolli, Emma Dante, Michelangelo Frammartino, Jennifer Fox, Chiara Malta, Masbedo, Pippo Mezzapesa, Susanna Nicchiarelli, Nelo Risi, Corso Salani, Daniele Vicari.

== Films produced ==
In 2007 My Country by Daniele Vicari won the David di Donatello Award for Best Documentary and Imatra by Corso Salani was awarded the Pardo d’Oro – Special Jury Prize in Locarno's Filmmakers of the present section.

In 2010 Le Quattro Volte by Michelangelo Frammartino, was premiered in Cannes Director's Fortnight Section and won the Europa Cinema Label Award. Since then, it has been sold in more than 45 countries, and has been travelling around the world in the most prestigious festivals receiving countless awards, being the most awarded Italian movie in 2010 and one of the most awarded Italian movies of the last 10 years. It was awarded a Special Nastro d'Oro in 2010. With Le Quattro Volte, in 2011 Marta Donzelli and Gregorio Paonessa got a nomination for the David di Donatello as “Best producer” and were awarded a Ciak d’Oro as "Best Producer".

In 2012 Pezzi by Luca Ferrari was awarded as Best Documentary at the Rome International Film Festival.

In 2013 Alberi, a cinematic installation in loop by Michelangelo Frammartino was world premiered in the prestigious V/W Dome of MoMA PS1, in partnership with Tribeca Film Festival. Alberi was also presented at Den Frie in Copenhagen in collaboration with CPH:DOX and at Teatro Cinema Manzoni in Milan in collaboration with Filmmaker International Film Festival.

A Street in Palermo, the first film by cult theatre director Emma Dante, was premiered in competition at the Venice Film Festival 2013 and Elena Cotta won the Coppa Volpi for "Best Actress".

Always in 2013 Sangue by Pippo Delbono was selected in the Official Competition of Locarno International Film Festival and Wolf, a documentary film by Claudio Giovannesi, was in competition at the 31° edition of the Torino Film Festival in the section TFF/DOC Italiana.doc and won the Jury Award.

The Lack by Masbedo was world premiered in the Venice Days section of the 2014 Venice Film Festival.

In February 2015 Sworn Virgin by Laura Bispuri had its world premiere in competition at the Berlinale, then it started a long trip between international festivals all around the world, receiving important awards: among others, the prestigious Nora Ephron Prize at Tribeca Film Festival in New York, the Firebird Award at Young Competition of Hong Kong International Film Festival, the Golden Gate New Directors Prize at San Francisco International Film Festival, the Globo d'Oro 2015, assigned by Italian foreign press, as "Best First Film". Sworn Virgin was also nominated for a David di Donatello award as "Best First Film".

In September 2015 Innocence of Memories by Grant Gee, a UK coproduction, was presented at the “Authors’ Days” of Venice Film Festival.

In 2016, Children of the Night by Andrea De Sica was premiered in competition at the 2016 Torino Film Festival, where it was the only Italian film in competition. Thanks to that movie, Andrea De Sica won a Silver Ribbon Award for Best New Director and he was nominated for a David di Donatello Award as Best New Director.

In 2017, Nico, 1988 by Susanna Nicchiarelli, a biographical film based on the last years of Christa Päffgen (Nico), opened the section Orizzonti at the 74th Venice Film Festival, where it won the Best Film award. In addition the movie received 4 David di Donatello, including the Best Original Script award.

Still in 2017, Vivo Film produced both Jacopo Quadri's documentary Lorello e Brunello, premiered in the official competition at the Torino Film Festival where it was given the Cipputti Award and a Special Mention of the Jury, and Looking for Oum Kulthum by Shirin Neshat, a co-production between Italy, Germany and Austria, which was presented at the “Authors’ Days” of Venice Film Festival and lately at the Toronto International Film Festival.

In 2018, Daughter of Mine by Laura Bispuri had its premiere in the official competition of Berlinale and it won the FIREBIRD AWARD at the Hong Kong International Film Festival, the Media Choice for the Best Film at the Shangai Film Festival and the Golden Anchor Award at the Haifa International Film Festival.

Vivo Film is currently committed in the post production of Federico Bondi's Dafne, Michela Occhipinti's Flesh Out and Maura Delpero's Maternal.

== Filmography ==
- Radio clandestina, directed by Ascanio Celestini (2004)
- Site Specific_Roma 04, directed by Olivo Barbieri (2004)
- Giorni in prova. Emilio Rentocchini poeta a Sassuolo, directed by Daria Menozzi (2006)
- Il mio paese, directed by Daniele Vicari (2006)
- Papervision #1 Chiara Carrer. Nel mondo dell'illustrazione per bambini, directed by Elisabetta Lodoli (2006)
- Scorretto, directed by Marco Presta (2006)
- Stessa spiaggia stesso mare, directed by Guido Chiesa (2006)
- L'ultima utopia. La televisione secondo Rossellini, directed by Jean-Louis Comolli (2006)
- Il tuffo della rondine, directed by Stefano Savona (2007)
- Scemi di guerra. La follia nelle trincee, directed by Enrico Verra (2008)
- L'ultima sentinella, directed by Susanna Nicchiarelli (2008)
- Pinuccio Lovero. Sogno di una morte di mezza estate, directed by Pippo Mezzapesa (2008)
- Possibili rapporti. Due poeti, due voci, directed by Nelo Risi (2008)
- Armando e la politica, directed by Chiara Malta (2008)
- Uso improprio, directed by Luca Gasparini and Alberto Masi (2008)
- Con la furia di un ragazzo. Un ritratto di Bruno Trentin, directed by Franco Giraldi (2008)
- Lo specchio, directed by David Christensen (2009)
- Mirna, directed by Corso Salani (2009)
- L'Aquila bella mé, directed by Pietro Pelliccione and Mauro Rubeo (2009)
- Foscia, pesci, Africa, sonno, nausea, fantasia, directed by Andrea De Sica and Daniele Vicari (2009)
- Le Quattro Volte, directed by Michelangelo Frammartino (2010)
- My Reincarnation, directed by Jennifer Fox (2010)
- Profughi a Cinecittà, directed by Marco Bertozzi (2012)
- Pinuccio Lovero Yes I Can, directed by Pippo Mezzapesa (2012)
- Il muro e la bambina, directed by Silvia Staderoli (2013)
- Alberi, video-installation by Michelangelo Frammartino (2013)
- Sangue, directed by Pippo Delbono (2013)
- A Street in Palermo, directed by Emma Dante (2013)
- Wolf, directed by Claudio Giovannesi (2013)
- The lack, directed by Masbedo (2014)
- Innocence of Memories, directed by Grant Gee (2015)
- Cose salve, directed by Alberta Pellacani (2015)
- Sworn Virgin, directed by Laura Bispuri (2015)
- Where is Rocky II?, directed by Pierre Bismuth (2016)
- Molly Bloom, directed by Chiara Caselli (2016)
- Il matrimonio, directed by Paola Salerno (2016)
- Children of the Night, directed by Andrea De Sica (2016)
- Nico, 1988, directed by Susanna Nicchiarelli (2017)
- Looking for Oum Kulthum, directed by Shirin Neshat (2017)
- Lorello e Brunello, by Jacopo Quadri (2017)
- Daughter of Mine, directed by Laura Bispuri (2018)
- Flesh Out, directed by Michela Occhipinti (2019)
- Dafne, directed by Federico Bondi (2019)
- Maternal, directed by Maura Delpero (2019)

=== Series Confini d'Europa ===
Directed by Corso Salani.

1. Ceuta e Gibilterra (2006)
2. Rio De Onor (2006)
3. Imatra (2007)
4. Talsi (2007)
5. Chişinău (2007)
6. Yotvata (2007)

=== Series Ritratto dell'autore da cucciolo ===
- Il cuore del soldatino, directed by Guido Chiesa (2007)
- Tracce, directed by Corso Salani (2007)

== Distribution ==
- Jeg er levende – Søren Ulrik Thomsen, digter, directed by Jørgen Leth (1999)
- C'è un posto in Italia, directed by Corso Salani (2005)
- Le cinéma passe à table, directed by Anne Andreu (2005)
- Il peggio di noi, directed by Corso Salani (2006)
- Elle s'appelle Sabine, directed by Sandrine Bonnaire (2007)
- Dopotutto non sono un bel paesaggio, directed by Emiliano Monaco (2011)
- Pezzi, directed by Luca Ferrari (2012)
- I Racconti dell'Orso, directed by Samuele Sestieri, Olmo Amato (2017)
- Lorello e Brunello, directed by Jacopo Quadri (2017)
