= Balkan sworn virgins =

Traditional third gender social role

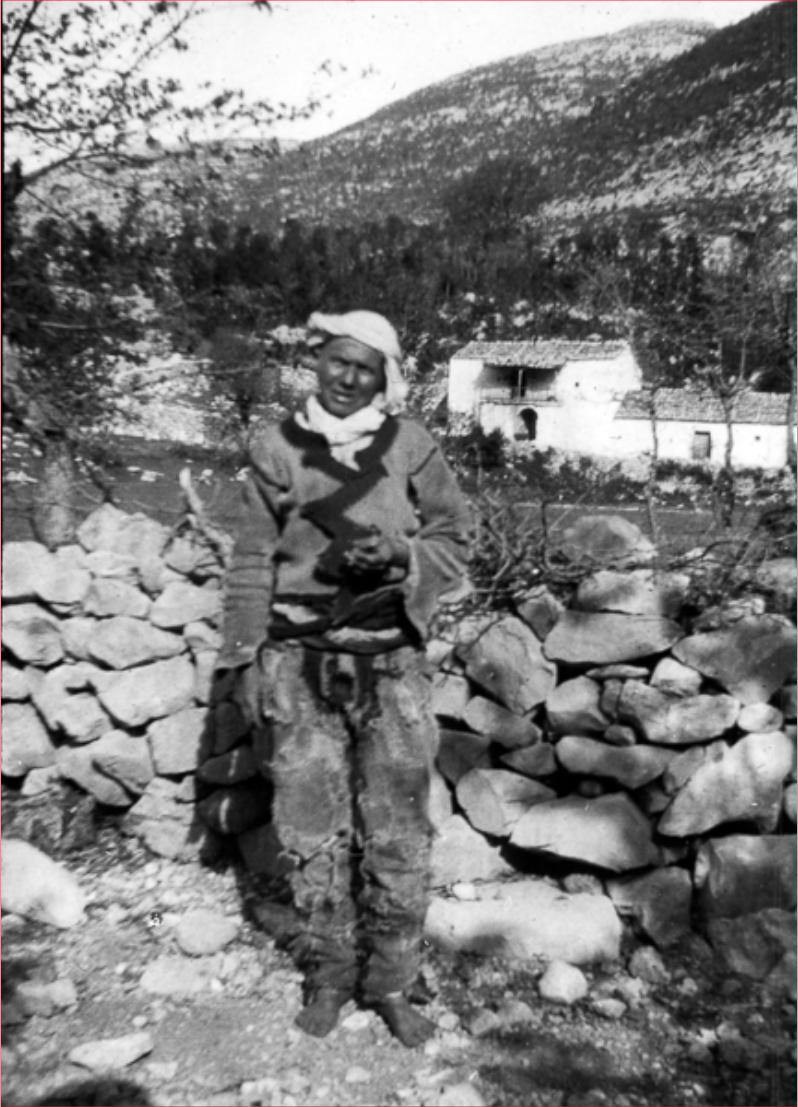
Sworn virgin in Rapsha, Hoti, Ottoman Albania, 1908

A sworn virgin is a traditional gender variant or third gender social role in certain Balkan cultures, consisting of people who are assigned female at birth but take a vow of chastity and live out their lives socially recognized as men. The practice is most common in patriarchal northern Albania, Kosovo and Montenegro, where burrnesha are recognized under the tribal Kanun law, but also exists, or has existed, to a lesser extent in other parts of the western Balkans, including Bosnia, Dalmatia (Croatia), Serbia and North Macedonia.

In times when women had a prescribed role, burrnesha gave up their preexisting sexual, reproductive and social identities to acquire the same freedoms as men. They could dress as men, be head of the household, move freely in social situations, and take work traditionally open only to men. National Geographic's Taboo estimated in 2002 that there were fewer than 102 Albanian sworn virgins left. As of 2022, while there were no exact figures, twelve burrnesha were estimated to remain in Northern Albania and Kosovo.

== Terminology ==
Other terms for a sworn virgin include, in English, Albanian virgin or avowed virgin; in Albanian: burrnesha (plural: burrneshë), vajzë e betuar (most common today, and used in situations in which the parents make the decision when the person is a baby or child), and various words cognate with "virgin" – virgjineshë, virgjereshë, verginesa, virgjin, vergjinesha; in Bosnian: tobelija (bound by a vow); in Serbo-Croatian: virdžina; in Serbian: ostajnica (she who stays); in Turkish: sadik, meaning "loyal, devoted".

== Origins ==
Sworn virgins have been documented in the area as early as the 15th century. The tradition of sworn virgins in Albania likely developed out of the Kanuni i Lekë Dukagjinit (English: The Code of Lekë Dukagjini, or simply the Kanun), a set of codes and laws developed by Lekë Dukagjini and used mostly in northern Albania and Kosovo from the Ottoman era until the 20th century. The Kanun is not a religious document; many groups follow it, including Albanian Orthodox, Catholics and Muslims.

The Kanun dictates that families must be patrilineal (meaning wealth is inherited through a family's men) and patrilocal (upon marriage, a woman moves into the household of her husband's family). Women are treated like property of the family. Under the Kanun, women are stripped of many rights. They cannot smoke, wear a watch, or vote in local elections. They cannot buy land, and there are many jobs they are not permitted to hold. There are also establishments that they cannot enter.

The nature of this culture involves a history of violence in the form of endemic blood feuds. This practice inadvertently produces sworn virgins. In many cases, the fighting between men left families with no remaining male members. This created a need for someone to be able to inherit their father’s or brother’s wealth and continue providing for the family, thus a daughter undergoes the ceremony to be considered a sworn virgin.

The practice of sworn virginhood was first reported by missionaries, travelers, geographers and anthropologists, who visited the mountains of northern Albania in the 19th and early 20th centuries. One of them was Edith Durham, who took the accompanying photograph.

== Overview ==
A person can become a sworn virgin at any age. Motivations for doing so include personal desire, to avoid forced marriage, or to satisfy familial obligations. One becomes a sworn virgin by swearing an irrevocable oath, in front of twelve village or tribal elders, to adopt the role and practice celibacy. After this, sworn virgins live as men and others relate to them as such, usually though not always using masculine pronouns to address them or speak about them to other people. In Slavic languages with three grammatical genders, they are never spoken about in the third gender. Sworn virgins may dress in male clothing, use a male name, carry a gun, smoke, drink alcohol, take on male work, act as the head of a household (for example, living with a sister or mother), play music, sing, and sit and talk socially with men. Sworn virgins occupy a formal, socially defined masculine role. The New York Times referred to the practice as "a centuries-old tradition in which women declared themselves men so they could enjoy male privilege". Said privilege is connected to performing a male role in duties and behaviour, including a strong misogyny found in many sworn virgins. It marks a separation from their birth gender, evident in one refusing to even directly talk to a female researcher: "Mikaš did not consider Gušić worthy of their conversion."

According to Marina Warner, the sworn virgin's "true sex will never again, on pain of death, be alluded to either in [his] presence or out of it." Similar practices occurred in some societies of indigenous peoples of the Americas.

Breaking the vow was once punishable by death, but it is doubtful that this punishment is still carried out. Many sworn virgins today still refuse to go back on their oath because their community would reject them for breaking the vows. However, it is sometimes possible to take back the vows if the reasons or motivations or obligations to family which led to taking the vow no longer exist.

== Motivations ==
There are many reasons why someone might take this vow, and observers recorded a variety of motivations. One person spoke of becoming a sworn virgin in order to not be separated from his father, and another in order to live and work with a sister. Some hoped to avoid a specific unwanted marriage, and others hoped to avoid marriage in general; becoming a sworn virgin was also the only way for families who had committed children to an arranged marriage to refuse to fulfil it, without dishonouring the groom's family and risking a blood feud.

It was the only way a woman could inherit her family's wealth, which was particularly important in a society in which blood feuds (gjakmarrja) resulted in the deaths of many male Albanians, leaving many families without male heirs. (However, anthropologist Jeffrey Dickemann suggests this motive may be "over-pat", pointing out that a non-child-bearing woman would have no heirs to inherit after her, and also that in some families not one but several daughters became sworn virgins, and in others the later birth of a brother did not end the sworn virgin's masculine role.) Moreover, a child may have been desired to "carry on" an existing feud, according to Marina Warner. The sworn virgin became "a warrior in disguise to defend [his] family like a man." If a sworn virgin was killed in a blood feud, the death counted as a full life for the purposes of calculating blood money, rather than the half-life a woman was counted as.

It is also likely that many people chose to become sworn virgins simply because it afforded them much more freedom than would otherwise have been available in a patrilineal culture in which women were secluded, sex-segregated, required to be virgins before marriage and faithful afterwards, betrothed as children and married by sale without their consent, continually bearing and raising children, constantly physically labouring, and always required to defer to men, particularly their husbands and fathers, and submit to being beaten.

Dickemann suggests mothers may have played an important role in persuading children to become sworn virgins. A widow without sons traditionally had few options in Albania: she could return to her birth family, stay on as a servant in the family of her deceased husband, or remarry. With a son or surrogate son, she could live out her life in the home of her adulthood, in the company of her child. Murray quotes testimony recorded by René Gremaux: "Because if you get married I'll be left alone, but if you stay with me, I'll have a son." On hearing those words the daughter Djurdja "threw down her embroidery" and became a man.

== Nuances in Perception ==
There are many ways that the sworn celibates of Albania can be perceived anthropologically, which result in conclusions that are being applied to modern gender studies. These men can be grouped into two categories: vow imposed and vow accepted. While both groups consist of individuals assigned female at birth, former group is defined as those who have had the role of sworn celibate predetermined for them based on economic and social circumstances that result in the family needing someone to fill the role of head of household. Vow accepted, on the other hand, consists of those who chose to take on this role on their own.

The Balkan sworn celibates are not simply biological women and social men. There are cases in which the sworn virgin only took on some aspects of men’s roles. Some were known to still prefer the company of women. Others presumed the role of men during the day but acted as women at night. The reverse is true as well. They also argue that sworn virgins, when their status protects them from blood feuds, take on the role of not quite a man, but a third gender entirely.

Some argue that many western observers generalize the reality of the burrnesha too broadly, implying that their position in society is always forced and against the will of these men. Many reports have demonstrated great satisfaction among the sworn virgins with their decision.

== Sexuality ==
The sexual practices of the Balkan sworn virgins have relatively little research related to it. Despite the presence of their virginity, the question of homosexuality comes into play. Many of these men were recorded as not knowing what lesbianism was, despite the social acceptance of homosexuality among shepherds in the area. Some sworn virgins were noted to fall in love with or marry women.

== Prevalence ==
The practice has died out in Dalmatia and Bosnia, but is still carried out in northern Albania and to a lesser extent in North Macedonia.

The Socialist People's Republic of Albania did not encourage people to become sworn virgins. Women started gaining legal rights and came closer to having equal social status, especially in the central and southern regions. It is only in the northern region that many families are still traditionally patriarchal. In 2008, there were between forty and several hundred sworn virgins left in Albania, and a few in neighboring countries, most over fifty years old, with an estimated twelve left in 2022. It used to be believed that the sworn virgins had all but died out after 50 years of communism in Albania, but recent research suggests that may not be the case; instead, the increase in feuding following the collapse of the communist regime could encourage a resurgence of the practice.

== In popular culture ==
- Virdžina (1991), a Yugoslav drama film based on this old custom, directed by Srđan Karanović.
- In "The Albanian Virgin" (1994), a short story by Alice Munro first published in The New Yorker, a Canadian woman being held hostage by Albanians takes the vow to avoid forced marriage. (For information about documented kidnappings, see Ion Perdicaris and the Miss Stone Affair.)
- Italian director Laura Bispuri's first feature film, Sworn Virgin (2015), depicts the life of Hana, played by Italian actress Alba Rohrwacher. The film is based on the novel of the same name by Albanian writer Elvira Dones. There are centuries-old Albanian communities in Italy.
- In The Albanian Virgin (2021) directed by Bujar Alimani. The main character has to be a sworn virgin to avenge her father.
- Bulgarian writer Rene Karabash explores the topic in her debut novel She Who Remains. The novel was shortlisted for the International Booker Prize in 2026.

== Noted sworn virgins ==
- Stana Cerović
- Mikaš Karadžić
- Tone Bikaj
- Durdjan Ibi Glavola
- Stanica-Daga Marinković

== See also ==
- Samsui women, a similar practice among Chinese diaspora women in Southeast Asia
- Bacha posh, a similar practice in Afghanistan and Pakistan
- Vestal Virgin
- Honorary male
