= Rohrwacher =

Rohrwacher is a surname. Notable people with the surname include:

- Alba Rohrwacher (born 1979), Italian actress
- Alice Rohrwacher (born 1981), Italian film director, editor, and screenwriter
