= Kasia Smutniak =

Polish actress and model (born 1979)

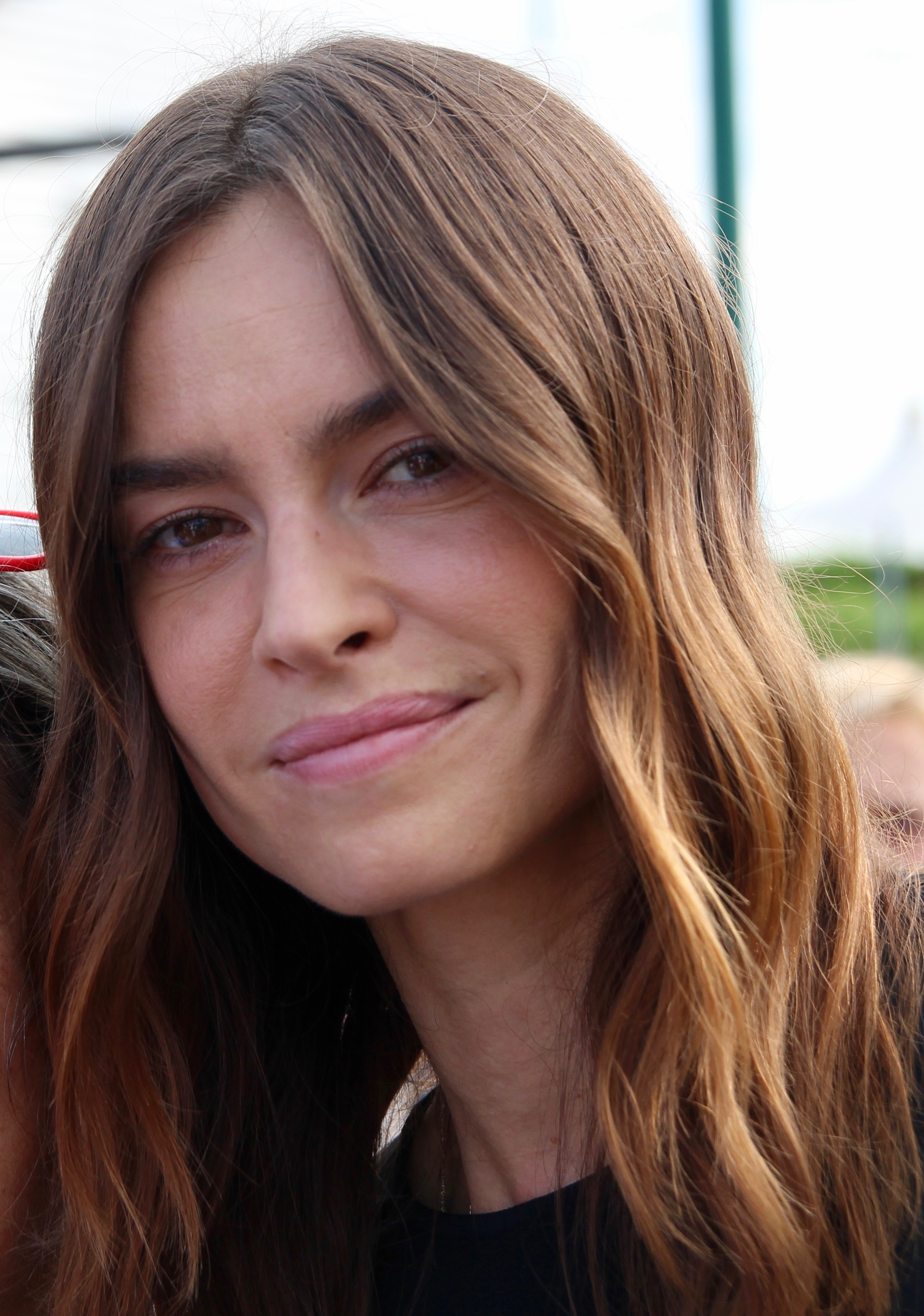
- Kasia Smutniak in 2018
- Born: Katarzyna Anna Smutniak; 13 August 1979 (age 47); Warsaw, Poland
- Occupations: Actress; film director
- Years active: 1996–present
- Notable work: Loro
- Height: 1.73 m (5 ft 8 in)
- Spouse: Domenico Procacci (m. 2019)
- Children: 2
- Website: kasiasmutniak.it

Katarzyna Anna "Kasia" Smutniak (Polish pronunciation: [ˈkaɕa ˈsmutɲak]; born 13 August 1979) is a Polish-Italian actress. She has also directed the documentary films Mur (2023) and Mustang (2026); the latter shared the Terna Audience Award at the 21st Rome Film Festival with Rafiki Fariala's Congo Boy.

== Personal life ==
Smutniak was born in Warsaw, Poland. Her father, Brigadier General Zenon Smutniak, is a military pilot and served in the Polish Air Force. At 16, she obtained a glider pilot's license. Her mother is a nurse.

With Italian actor Pietro Taricone, who died in an accident in 2010, she has a daughter, Sophie, born in 2004. She has a son, Leone, born in 2014 with Italian film producer Domenico Procacci. The couple later married in September 2019.

In addition to Polish, Smutniak speaks fluent Russian, English and Italian.

== Filmography ==
=== Film ===
Title	Year	Role(s)	Director	Notes
At the Right Moment	2000	Serena	Giorgio Panariello	
Haker	2002	Laura	Janusz Zaorski	
Radio West	2003	Iliana	Alessandro Valori	
Ora e per sempre	2004	Sally Burke	Vincenzo Verdecchi	
13 at a Table	2004	Anna	Enrico Oldoini	
In Your Hands	2007	Mavi	Peter Del Monte	
Quiet Chaos	2008	Jolanda	Antonello Grimaldi	
Carnera: The Walking Mountain	2008	Emilia Tersini	Renzo Martinelli	
Tutta colpa di Giuda	2009	Irena Mirkovic	Davide Ferrario	
Goal III: Taking on the World	2009	Sophia Tardelli	Andy Morahan	
Barbarossa	2009	Eleonora	Renzo Martinelli	
From Paris with Love	2010	Caroline	Pierre Morel	
Scontro di civiltà per un ascensore a Piazza Vittorio	2010	Giulia	Isotta Toso	
La Passione	2010	Caterina	Carlo Mazzacurati	
The Fourth State	2012	Katja	Dennis Gansel	
Tutti contro tutti	2013	Anna	Rolando Ravello	
Welcome Mr. President	2013	Janis Clementi	Riccardo Milani	
Fasten Your Seatbelts	2014	Elena	Ferzan Özpetek	
Wondrous Boccaccio	2015	Ghismunda	Paolo and Vittorio Taviani	
Perfect Strangers	2016	Eva	Paolo Genovese	
Moglie e marito	2017	Sofia Valente	Simone Godano	
Made in Italy	2018	Sara	Luciano Ligabue	
Loro	2018	Kira	Paolo Sorrentino	
The Happiest Man in the World	2018	Herself	Gipi	Cameo appearance
La profezia dell'armadillo	2018	Eco-Operator	Emanuele Scaringi	Cameo appearance
La prima pietra	2018	Mrs. Hatab	Rolando Ravello	
Dolce Fine Giornata	2019	Anna	Jacek Borcuch	
(Nie)znajomi	2019	Ewa	Tadeusz Sliwa	Also co-producer
Dolittle	2020	Lily Dolittle	Stephen Gaghan	
3/19	2021	Camilla	Silvio Soldini	
The Hummingbird	2022	Marina Molitor	Francesca Archibugi	
Pantafa	2022	Marta	Emanuele Scaringi	
Mur	2023	None	Kasia Smutniak	Documentary; directional debut
Diamonds	2024	Sofia Volpi	Ferzan Özpetek	
Mustang	2026	None	Kasia Smutniak	Documentary; Terna Audience Award (tied)
The Resurrection of the Christ: Part One †	2027	Mary, mother of Jesus	Mel Gibson	Post-production
The Resurrection of the Christ: Part Two †	2028	Mary, mother of Jesus	Mel Gibson	Post-production

=== Television ===
Title	Year	Role(s)	Network	Notes
Ultimo – L'infiltrato	2004	Anna De Rosa	Canale 5	Two-parts television movie
Questa è la mia terra	2006–2008	Giulia Corradi	Canale 5	Lead role
La moglie cinese	2006	Ilja	Rai 1	Miniseries
St. Giuseppe Moscati: Doctor to the Poor	2007	Elena Cajafra	Rai 1	Two-parts television movie
Rino Gaetano: Ma il cielo è sempre più blu	2007	Irene Rebecchi	Rai 1	Two-parts television movie
Inspector De Luca	2008	Laura Utimperger	Rai 1	Episode: "Indagine non autorizzata"
Buio	2013	Ester	Sky Cinema	Miniseries
Volare – La grande storia di Domenico Modugno	2013	Franca Gandolfi	Rai 1	Two-parts television movie
In Treatment	2013	Sara	Sky Cinema	8 episodes
Limbo	2015	Manuela Paris	Rai 1	Television movie
Devils	2020	Nina Morgan	Sky Atlantic	Main role (season 1)
Domina	2021–2023	Livia Drusilla	Sky Atlantic	Main role

== Awards and nominations ==
Award	Year	Category	Nominated work	Result
Globo d'oro	2008	Best Breakthrough Actress	In Your Hands	Won
Globo d'oro	2008	Best Actress	In Your Hands	Nominated
David di Donatello	2014	Best Actress	Fasten Your Seatbelts	Nominated
David di Donatello	2019	Best Supporting Actress	Loro	Nominated
David di Donatello	2024	Best Documentary	Mur	Nominated
Nastro d'argento	2008	European Nastro d'Argento	In Your Hands	Won
Nastro d'argento	2013	Best Actress	Welcome Mr. President	Nominated
Nastro d'argento	2014	Best Actress	Fasten Your Seatbelts	Won
Nastro d'argento	2014	Serapian Award	Fasten Your Seatbelts	Won
Nastro d'argento	2016	Special Nastro d'Argento	Perfect Strangers	Won
Nastro d'argento	2017	Nino Manfredi Award	Moglie e marito	Won
Nastro d'argento	2018	Best Supporting Actress	Loro	Won
Nastro d'argento	2022	Best Actress	3/19	Nominated
Nastro d'argento	2023	Best Supporting Actress	The Hummingbird	Nominated
Terni Film Festival	2023	Best Director	Mur	Won
Rome Film Festival	2026	Terna Audience Award (tied)	Mustang	Won
