= Marco Foschi =

Italian actor

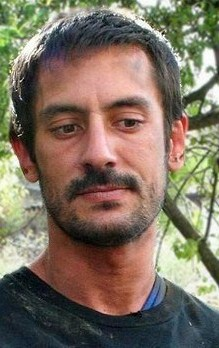
- Born: 1 April 1977 (age 49); Rome, Italy
- Occupations: Actor; voice actor
- Years active: 1999-present
- Father: Massimo Foschi

Marco Foschi (born 1 April 1977) is an Italian actor and voice actor. He played in the 2012 film King of the Sands directed by Najdat Anzour and in the 2012 American-Italian television movie Barabbas, as Jesus.

== Filmography ==
=== Cinema ===
- Chemical Hunger (2003)
- In Your Hands (2007)
- Come tu mi vuoi (2007)
- Good Morning Heartache (2008)
- Purple Sea (2009)
- I soliti idioti: Il film (2011)
- La solita commedia: Inferno (2015)
- Agadah (2017)
- The Stolen Caravaggio (2018)

=== Television ===
- Virginia, la monaca di Monza (2004)
- Pius XII: Under the Roman Sky (2010)
- Atelier Fontana - Le sorelle della moda (2011)
- Barabbas (2012)
- L'isola (2012)
- Mary of Nazareth (2012)
- Medici (2019)
