= The Solitude of Prime Numbers (novel) =

2008 novel by Paolo Giordano

- 2009 Book Cover
- Author: Paolo Giordano
- Translator: Shaun Whiteside
- Subject: Psychological fiction, life changing events, solitude
- Genre: Italian novel translated to English
- Set in: Italy
- Published: 2009, 2010
- Publisher: Doubleday, Pamela Dorman Books
- Publication place: United States, Britain
- Media type: Print, e-book, audio
- Pages: 349
- ISBN: 9780385616249 9780385616256
- OCLC: 315073806

The Solitude of Prime Numbers (Italian: La solitudine dei numeri primi) is a novel by the Italian author Paolo Giordano and published in Italian in 2008 by Mondadori. The book was translated from Italian to English at some point by Shaun Whiteside. The book was released in English by Doubleday in Britain in 2009, and by Pamela Dorman Books in the United States in 2010, also in English.

This book won the 2008 Strega Prize. A cinematic adaptation of the novel was directed by Saverio Costanzo and released in 2010.

== Overview ==
The novel narrates the childhood and early adulthood of a boy and girl who were each exposed to traumatic situations that followed them into adulthood. Both are described as outsiders, similar to how two prime numbers, like 11 and 13, "seem connected because of their proximity, but are not." Their relationship unfolds in a similar way, as they befriend each other and become very close but never romantic. Their relationship appears to have run its course, but circumstances bring them together again and while they clearly love each other, they are unable to express their emotions. This relationship is compared to prime pairs: always together, but never touching.

Although the setting is never mentioned explicitly, references to Gran Madre Church, the Basilica of Superga, the Maria Ausiliatrice hospital, and to Fraitève and Monte Fraiteve identify the locale as Turin.

== Plot ==
As a seven-year-old girl, Alice Della Rocca is forced by her father to take skiing lessons, although she hates the ski school and has no particular aptitude for the sport. One morning, Alice is separated from the rest of the group and falls off a cliff, sustaining serious injuries. Alice will remain crippled for the rest of her life.

Mattia Balossino is a gifted and intelligent child, unlike his twin sister Michela, who has an intellectual disability. Isolated from the rest of his peers because of his uncomfortable sister, Mattia lives his childhood in solitude. When he and his sister are invited to a classmate's birthday party, Mattia leaves Michela in a park so he can attend the party without her. Upon his return to the park a few hours later, Michela has disappeared, perhaps drowned in a nearby pond, and is never found despite a police search and investigation.

These events deeply affect the lives of both Alice and Mattia. During adolescence, Alice has anorexia nervosa and is snubbed by boys as a cripple. With no social life, Alice draws the attention of Viola Bai, a popular but cruel girl in her class, who toys with Alice and briefly allows Alice into her circle of friends. With Viola's encouragement, Alice meets Mattia. Mattia is difficult to get along with; he is not interested in social interactions and has an unhealthy tendency to cut himself.

Alice and Mattia form an unusual friendship: each of them carries on with their own lives; however they return to look for one another. They continue to "date" even after high school. Both attend a university, where Mattia studies mathematics, and where Alice drops-out to pursue her passion for photography. When Alice's mother Fernanda is hospitalized for cancer treatment, Alice meets Fabio Rovelli, a young doctor who takes an interest in her. Mattia, meanwhile, completes his degree and receives an offer to teach at a university in Northern Europe (probably in Norway). While he is debating whether to leave Italy and take the job, Mattia finally tells Alice about Michela, and the two kiss for the first time. However, an argument between them convinces Mattia that leaving is the right decision. Later, Fernanda dies and Alice marries Fabio, while Mattia lives alone abroad.

The marriage between Fabio and Alice gradually disintegrates. Fabio wants a child, but Alice, who hasn't menstruated for years because of anorexia, cannot get pregnant and refuses to change her eating habits. The couple separates and Alice falls into depression.

Elsewhere, Mattia is a successful mathematics professor at his foreign university. He and Alberto, a colleague and fellow Italian, make an important discovery regarding algebraic topology. When celebrating at Alberto's house, Mattia meets Alberto's friend Nadia, and spends the night with her. Back in Italy, the photographer employing Alice insists on driving her to the hospital to get help for her depression. While there, she encounters an apparently disabled woman who looks a lot like Mattia, and Alice wonders if it could be Michela. She writes to Mattia, urging him to come home without telling him why.

Mattia accepts the invitation and returns to Italy. Alice, now unsure about what she saw, avoids telling him why she asked him to come. The two friends spend an afternoon together during which she kisses him and realizes that she's still in love with him. In spite of this, they both realize they cannot overcome the walls that separate them.

== Secondary characters ==
- Soledad Galienas – the Della Roccas' Ecuadorian maid. She shows a maternal affection towards Alice, who does not always reciprocate, not only refusing food with anger but even blackmailing her to make her pretend to be Alice's mother, and as such allowing Alice to get a tattoo, what Alice's real parents would not do.
- Viola Bai – a rich and popular girl who, despite her cruel behavior, becomes Alice's role model. Viola introduces Alice to Mattia, and Alice gets a tattoo of a violet as tribute. Viola soon ends their friendship, perhaps jealous of the closeness between Alice and Mattia. Later, Viola marries and seems to have softened, as Alice notes while photographing her wedding.
- Denis – a classmate of Mattia's and the closest person he has to a friend. An initially closeted gay man, he feels a deep attraction to Mattia which fades with time.
- Fabio Rovelli – the young doctor who treats Alice's mother. After a long courtship showcasing all his security and confidence, he marries Alice, but they separate following a dispute about her anorexia.
- Alberto Torcia – Mattia's Italian colleague whom he met at university abroad. He is married and has a son named Philip.
- Nadia – a friend of Alberto's who is introduced to Mattia midway through the novel; Mattia spends the night with her.
- Mr Della Rocca – Alice's father, an attorney whose first name is never stated clearly. He and Alice do not have a good relationship after the incident.
- Fernanda – Alice's mother who, towards the end of the book, dies of breast cancer.
- Giada Savarino, Federica and Giulia Mazzoldi Mirandi – Viola's friends with whom they form the group called "the four asses". Alice meets Giada and Giulia again at Viola's wedding.
- Marcello Crozza – the photographer with whom Alice works, and who considers Alice almost like a daughter.
- Pietro and Adele Balossino – Mattia's parents, who struggle with Michela's mental disability, and whose relationship falls apart after Michela's disappearance.
- Riccardo Pelotti – the child who invites Mattia, and, more reluctantly, Michela, to his party. He is described as an unlikable child, appearing to have invited the twins out of courtesy rather than real interest.
- Walter – a cousin of Alice.
- Davide Poirino – a classmate of Alice in eighth grade. Alice unwittingly gives her first kiss to him, after he has been dared by his friends.
