= Licia Maglietta =

Italian actress and stage director (born 1954)

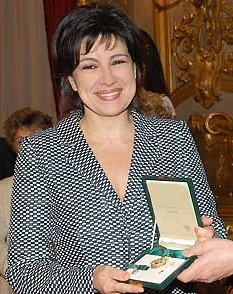
- Maglietta in 2004
- Born: Licia Maglietta; 16 November 1954 (age 71); Naples, Italy
- Occupation: Actress
- Years active: 1985–present

Licia Maglietta (born 16 November 1954) is an Italian actress and stage director, known for her work with Italian director Silvio Soldini. Their collaborations include romances Bread and Tulips (2000) – for which Maglietta won multiple awards – and Agata and the Storm (2004). In 2002 she won her second Italian Golden Globe, for Mafia drama Red Moon.

== Early career ==
Born in Naples, Licia Maglietta later studied theatre, dance and architecture. In 1981 she joined avant-garde stage company "Falso Movimento" (later renamed Teatri Uniti) where she worked with director Mario Martone. She also worked several times in a theatre company with actor Carlo Cecchi, and directed several stage plays.

Maglietta began her screen career in the mid 1980s via a run of television roles, including playing Desdemona in a 1985 telemovie based on Shakespeare's Othello. After working with Mario Martone on 1985 short film Nella citta Barocca, she later acted in Martone's first full-length feature, Death of a Neapolitan Mathematician (1992).

== Work with Silvio Soldini ==
Maglietta starred in three films for Italian writer/director Silvio Soldini. She won multiple awards for their second collaboration, Bread and Tulips. Maglietta and Soldini first worked together on the drama The Acrobats (1997). Maglietta co-stars as a divorced woman who befriends a woman from elsewhere in Italy. The Acrobats was invited to the 1997 Cannes Film Festival, in the Directors' Fortnight section.

Maglietta's breakout role was in the 2000 romance Bread and Tulips. She played accident-prone housewife Rosalba Barletta, who is left behind on a bus tour and finds herself in Venice, where she gets a job and finds accommodation with a mysterious but helpful maître d' (played by Bruno Ganz). The film won more than 30 awards, and Maglietta took away at least five of them, including a David di Donatello, a Nastro d'Argento, and a Ciak d'oro.

Maglietta's final collaboration with Silvio Soldini was the 2004 romantic comedy Agata and the Storm. She again co-starred; this time she played a woman running a bookshop in the Italian port city of Genoa, who romances a younger man.

== Later career ==
Since 2004 Maglietta's screen roles have mainly involved television, including Italian series In Treatment (as supervisor to the main character, a psychologist) and Una Pallottola nel Cuore (a.k.a. Bulletproof Heart).

== Selected filmography ==
- Death of a Neapolitan Mathematician (1992)
- Nasty Love (1995)
- The Acrobats (1997)
- Bread and Tulips (2000)
- Red Moon (2001)
- Agata and the Storm (2004)
- Paul VI: The Pope in the Tempest (2008)
- Sisi (2009)
- In Treatment (2013)
- Una Pallottola nel Cuore (2014)
