= Cannarozzi =

Cannarozzi is an Italian surname. Notable people with the surname include:

- Antonella Cannarozzi, Italian costume designer
- Pete Cannarozzi, keyboardist on Splendido Hotel, It's Alright (I See Rainbows), In Your Eyes, New Jersey Devils' organist
- Ted Cannarozzi, program directory for WRBQ-FM

== See also ==
- Juliana Cannarozzo
