= The Acrobats (film) =

1997 film by Silvio Soldini

- Directed by: Silvio Soldini
- Starring: Licia Maglietta; Valeria Golino
- Cinematography: Luca Bigazzi
- Music by: Giovanni Venosta
- Release date: 1997
- Running time: 123 minutes
- Country: Italy
- Language: Italian

The Acrobats (Italian: Le acrobate) is a 1997 Italian drama film directed by Silvio Soldini and starring Licia Maglietta and Valeria Golino. It was shown at the Cannes Film Festival in May 1997 in the Directors' Fortnight section.

== Synopsis ==
Elena, a divorced and childless chemist working at a cosmetics company in Treviso, shares her life with Stefano, a man also separated from his wife. One evening, on her way home from work, Elena accidentally hits Anita, an elderly Slavic woman. Intrigued by Anita's strong personality, Elena offers to take care of her, assisting with groceries and burying her deceased cat. After Anita's death, while organizing her home, Elena discovers postcards from Taranto. Believing the sender to be a relative of Anita, she decides to track him down. In Taranto, Elena meets Maria, a friend of Anita, and Maria's daughter Teresa, who is fascinated by the North. Maria and Elena become friends, navigating the twists of fate together, sharing a mutual desire to find deeper meaning in their lives.

== Cast ==
- Licia Maglietta: Elena
- Valeria Golino: Maria
- Angela Marraffa: Teresa
- Mira Sardoc: Anita
- Manrico Gammarota: Mirko
- Teresa Saponangelo: Giusi
- Roberto Citran: Elena's Ex Husband
- Fabrizio Bentivoglio: Stefano
- Giuseppe Battiston: Mondini
