= I Am Love (film) =

- Original Italian poster
- Italian: Io sono l'amore
- Directed by: Luca Guadagnino
- Screenplay by: Barbara Alberti; Ivan Cotroneo; Walter Fasano; Luca Guadagnino
- Story by: Luca Guadagnino
- Produced by: Luca Guadagnino; Tilda Swinton; Francesco Melzi d'Eril; Marco Morabito; Alessandro Usai; Massimiliano Violante
- Starring: Tilda Swinton; Flavio Parenti; Edoardo Gabbriellini; Alba Rohrwacher; Pippo Delbono; Maria Paiato; Diane Fleri; Mattia Zaccaro; Waris Ahluwalia; Gabriele Ferzetti; Marisa Berenson
- Cinematography: Yorick Le Saux
- Edited by: Walter Fasano
- Music by: John Adams
- Production company: First Sun
- Distributed by: Mikado Film
- Release dates: 5 September 2009 (Venice); 19 March 2010 (Italy)
- Running time: 120 minutes
- Country: Italy
- Languages: Italian; English; Russian
- Budget: $10 million
- Box office: $15.1 million

I Am Love (Italian: Io sono l'amore) is a 2009 Italian romantic drama film directed by Luca Guadagnino, set in Milan around the year 2000. Tilda Swinton plays a rich industrialist's wife who has an affair with a chef. It is the first installment in Guadagnino's self-described Desire trilogy, preceding A Bigger Splash (2015) and Call Me by Your Name (2017). Producers Swinton and Guadagnino developed the film together over an 11-year period. The film's soundtrack uses pre-existing compositions by John Adams.

The film premiered in September 2009 at the Venice Film Festival, followed by showings at various film festivals around the world. It first went on general release in Italy in March 2010, followed by the UK and Ireland in April 2010. In the United States it had only a limited release in June 2010, before being released on DVD in October 2010. The film received a nomination for an Academy Award for Best Costume Design at the 83rd Academy Awards.

== Plot ==
In 2000, the wealthy Recchi family is a first and second-generation textile-manufacturing family in Milan. Tancredi Recchi and his wife Emma are hosting a formal dinner party for Tancredi's ailing but still-formidable father, Edoardo Sr., patriarch and founder of the family business, who is celebrating his birthday.

As the many servants bustle about, the family notes with disappointment the news that Edoardo Jr., Tancredi and Emma's eldest son, lost an athletic competition on the day of his grandfather's birthday. Edoardo Jr. arrives from that competition, having informed the family that he has invited a girlfriend, Eva, of the prominent Ugolini family, whom he plans to marry.

Edoardo Jr.'s young adult siblings, Gianluca (Mattia Zaccaro) and Elisabetta, complain of yet again being served ukha, Edoardo Jr.'s favourite dish, a special soup his mother Emma, who is Russian by birth, has made for him since childhood.

The grandfather announces he is passing the family business to his son, Tancredi, who has long worked with him, and also, unexpectedly, to Edoardo Jr.

At the dinner, Elisabetta, who attends school in London, presents her grandfather with one of her artworks, a photograph, despite a tradition of presenting one another paintings. He is disappointed, but encouraged by his glamorous wife Allegra "Rori" Recchi (Marisa Berenson) to gloss over his disappointment.

Later during the birthday celebration, Edoardo Jr. receives a surprise visit from Antonio, the man who defeated Eduardo in the competition earlier that day. Antonio, a chef by trade, brings a beautiful cake as a gift, and Edoardo, flattered by the gesture, introduces him to his mother.

Several months after the party, while Emma is running errands, she discovers a CD, with a note from Elisabetta to her brother Edoardo revealing that Elisabetta is a lesbian. She tells her brother of an encounter with a woman and also reveals she is in love with a different woman. Meanwhile, Edoardo Jr. visits Antonio in Antonio's father's restaurant. They later make plans to open a restaurant together on some property Antonio's father owns in San Remo.

Months later, Emma is having lunch at Antonio's restaurant with Rori and Eva, and she is aroused while relishing a prawn dish he prepared for her.

Elisabetta returns to Milan, with her hair cut short, and invites Emma to go with her to Nice to look for a venue for Elisabetta's art exhibition. While stopping in San Remo en route to Nice to surprise her daughter, Emma spots Antonio, follows him, and eventually speaks to him outside of a book shop. She goes with him to his house in the hills above the city, and they begin their affair.

Meanwhile, Edoardo Sr. has died, and in London, Edoardo Jr. struggles as his father and other family members seek to sell the family business they inherited from Edoardo Sr. to foreign investors. Edoardo Jr. visits his sister and tells her of the future of the business and his opposition to the sale.

On her second trip to San Remo, under the pretext of discussing a menu for the formal dinner she will host for the foreign investors who are buying the Recchi family business, Emma spends the day with Antonio, and the two enjoy passionate sex. Emma tells Antonio how Tancredi met her during a trip to Russia hunting for art treasures. Antonio cuts Emma's blonde hair, a long lock of which falls unnoticed to the terrace, where Edoardo Jr. finds it during his own visit after the London meeting. They cook together, and Emma teaches him to make ukha.

On the night of the dinner at the Recchi villa for the investors, a conversation between Edoardo Jr. and Eva is overheard, revealing she is pregnant with his child. Antonio prepares ukha. When Edoardo sees this dish served, he instantly realizes his mother is having an affair with Antonio. He leaves the dinner table in a fury. Emma follows him outside to the garden and alongside the pool she tries to talk to him. In pulling away from Emma's outstretched hand, Edoardo loses his balance, falls, strikes his head on the edge of the pool's stone trim, and falls into the pool. He sustains a cerebral haemorrhage and dies in hospital.

At the cemetery following the funeral, Tancredi tries to console Emma. She tells him that she is in love with Antonio. He responds by telling her "You don't exist." Emma rushes home and changes her clothes while her housekeeper helps her pack her things to leave. Before she leaves, she exchanges a knowing glance with her daughter, who it appears understands her mother's desire to follow her heart. Eva, who has hardly been noticed by Edoardo's family since his death, clutches her abdomen as she calls out to Eduardo Jr.'s siblings and grandmother, revealing her pregnancy. When the family members look back into the foyer where Emma was standing, she is gone.

During the final credits, Emma and Antonio are seen lying together inside a cave.

== Inspiration ==
Aside from a few minor differences, the Recchi family are largely based on the aristocratic Castellini Baldissera family. Piero Castellini Baldissera appears in a cameo role multiple times throughout the film.

== Cast ==
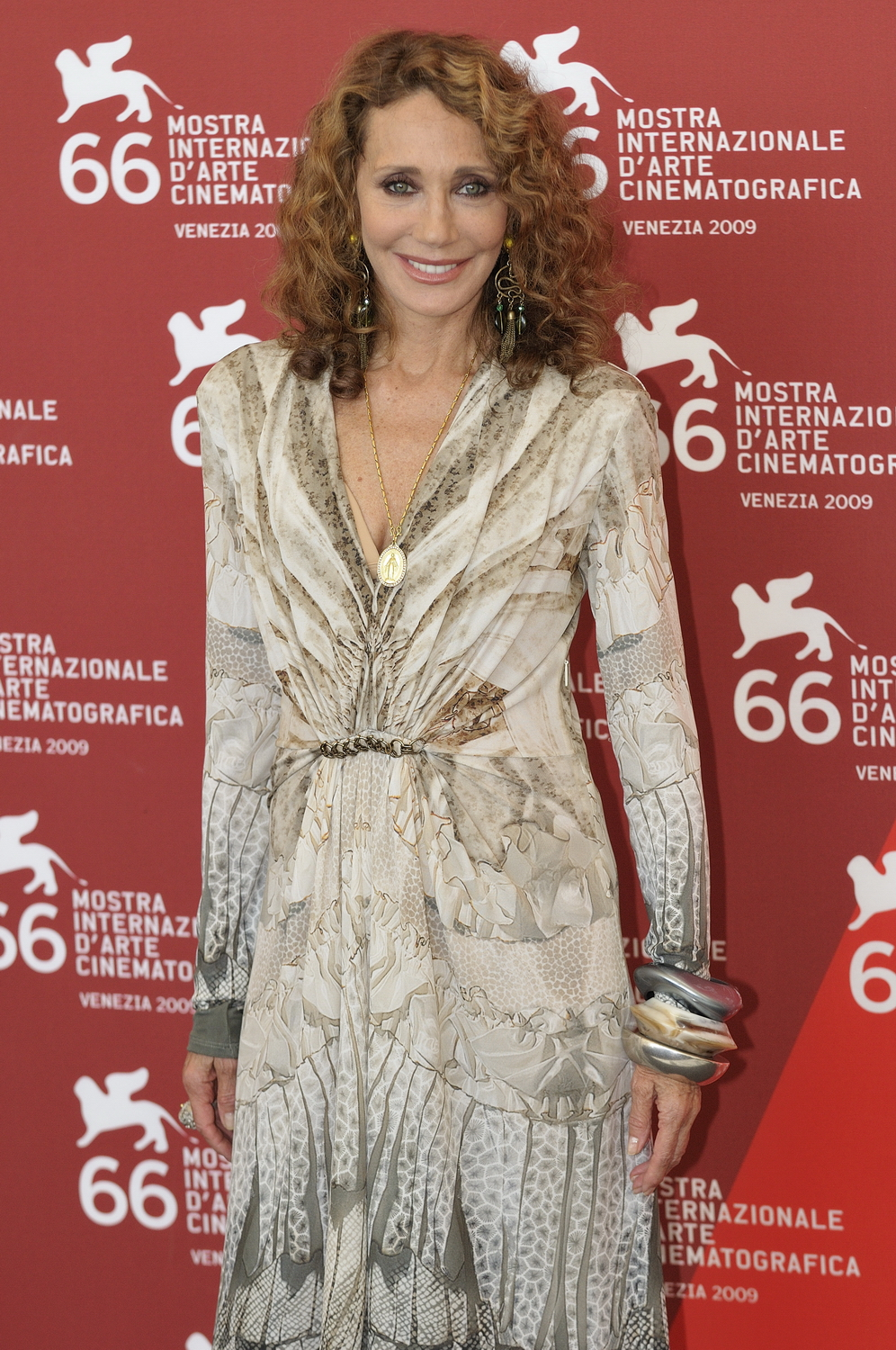
Marisa Berenson at the 2009 Venice Film Festival premier

- Tilda Swinton as Emma Recchi
- Flavio Parenti as Edoardo Recchi Jr.
- Edoardo Gabbriellini as Antonio Biscaglia
- Alba Rohrwacher as Elisabetta "Betta" Recchi
- Pippo Delbono as Tancredi Recchi
- Maria Paiato as Ida Roselli
- Diane Fleri as Eva Ugolini
- Waris Ahluwalia as Shai Kubelkian
- Marisa Berenson as Allegra Recchi, called Rori
- Gabriele Ferzetti as Edoardo Recchi Sr.
- Honor Swinton Byrne as Young Emma Recchi (non-speaking cameo)

== Production ==
Many of the scenes were shot in the Villa Necchi Campiglio, a 1930s mansion in the heart of Milan designed by architect Piero Portaluppi. and currently owned by Fondo Ambiente Italiano, following a 2001 donation by Gigina Necchi Campiglio and Nedda Necchi. While the plot and characters of the film are fictitious, the surname of the family portrayed (Recchi) clearly echoes that of the entrepreneurial family (Necchi) which owned the mansion, mixing it with the name of coastal town Recco (hinting to the role played by Liguria in the film). Tilda Swinton said the villa was perfect because they were looking for a house “that was part palace, part museum, and part prison.” The funeral and the subsequent scene were filmed in the Cimitero Monumentale di Milano and notably in its distinctive "Famedio" (Hall of Fame).

The soundtrack is made up entirely of pre-existing pieces by the modern classical composer John Adams. Swinton explained that the film was actually created around the pieces of music, and that they went to Adams after finishing the film and asked to use his music, which he had not allowed before. They were relieved when he liked the film and said yes. The film's title is taken from a line from the aria La mamma morta (from the opera Andrea Chénier by Umberto Giordano), which is explored in the film Philadelphia—a scene from which Swinton's character watches in bed with her husband.

The food and meals in the film were inspired by the cuisine of Carlo Cracco, the owner of the Cracco Peck restaurant in Milan.

== Reception ==
=== Box office ===
By March 2011, the film had grossed a total of USD$11,568,202 in cinemas worldwide. Home entertainment and TV sales are not included in the totals.

=== Critical response ===
I Am Love received positive reviews from critics. Review aggregator website Rotten Tomatoes gives the film an approval rating of 81% based on reviews from 137 critics, with an average score of 7.3/10. The website's critical consensus reads: "It stumbles into melodrama, but I Am Love backs up its flamboyance with tremendous visual style and a marvelous central performance from Tilda Swinton." Another review aggregator, Metacritic, which assigns a weighted average score out of 100 to reviews from mainstream critics, calculated a "generally favorable" score of 79 based on 32 reviews.

Roger Ebert of Chicago Sun-Times gave the film four out of four stars, praising Swinton's performance and saying "I Am Love is an amazing film. It is deep, rich, human. It is not about rich and poor, but about old and new. It is about the ancient war between tradition and feeling." The Washington Post's Ann Hornaday said the film was "carefully composed and framed, gorgeously appointed, superbly choreographed and accompanied by a thrilling musical score, it would no doubt provide rewarding fodder for critics of art, design, fashion, dance and music." Peter Bradshaw of The Guardian gave the film three out of five stars, saying "It's a high-IQ picture – there are few enough of those – and it's fascinating, if a little bloodless. A gorgeously costumed and styled piece of work."

Margaret Pomeranz of At the Movies gave the film four and a half out of five stars and said "This is a beautiful film, moving, stylish with a sensual romance at its heart." Betsy Sharkey of the Los Angeles Times praised Swinton's performance, saying "Swinton is one of the finest actresses working in contemporary cinema, but Guadagnino, who developed the project with her in mind, has created a film that literally luxuriates in her talents." Empire's Damon Wise gave the film four out of five stars and said "Though it drags a little, this stately film never descends into formula, using John Adams' score to great effect and boldly utilising the flourishes of '70s Italian genre cinema (zooms, handheld camera) to create something original, refreshing and really very moving."

Lisa Schwarzbaum of Entertainment Weekly gave the film a grade of "C+", saying "O sexytime in the countryside! O many wardrobe changes! The film is almost deliriously stylish, which helps mask the silliness. But the bellowing music, by John Adams, is infuriatingly intrusive – which undoes the visual good." Mark Demetrius of Filmink gave the film a negative review, stating "Despite an elegant and impressive visual style, the narrative of this slow-paced film is uninteresting and full of cliché." New York Film Critics Online called the work the Best Foreign Film of 2010. Quentin Tarantino listed it as one of his favorite 20 films of 2010.

=== Accolades ===
The film was nominated at the 68th Golden Globe Awards for Best Foreign Film but lost out to Denmark's In a Better World. Costume designer Antonella Cannarozzi was nominated for an Academy Award for Best Costume Design for her work in the film, but the award went to Colleen Atwood for Alice in Wonderland. The film was also nominated for the BAFTA Award for Best Film Not in the English Language, but lost to Niels Arden Oplev's The Girl with the Dragon Tattoo.
