= King of the Sands =

- Promotional poster
- Directed by: Najdat Anzour
- Starring: Fabio Testi, Bill Fellows and Marco Foschi
- Release date: 11 September 2013 (London premiere)
- Country: Syria
- Languages: English; Arabic

King of the Sands is a 2013 Syrian historical and biographical film, directed by Najdat Anzour, with the main characters starring Fabio Testi, Bill Fellows in the title roles.

== Story ==
King of the Sands is a biopic of King Abdulaziz, an emir of the central Arabian Al Saud clan and founder of the present-day kingdom of Saudi Arabia.

King of the Sands is presented as a "landmark taboo-breaking film", depicting a "dichotomous" story. It presents an impoverished prince in exile who reconquers his ancestral lands (Najd), and continues to expand his dominion until he controls the better part of the Arabian Peninsula. This accomplishment demanded "single-minded ruthlessness". He exterminated the rivaling Emirs of Ha'il. He later massacred his own shock troops, the Ikhwan (an irregular militia recruited from the main nomadic tribes), when they became a liability in the late 1920s and early 1930s. They had threatened the king's relations with the British in Jordan and Iraq. This film also depicts Western imperialism as impinging on the monarch's independence, foreshadowing the kingdom's future entanglement in world affairs once the oil started to flow.

== Cast ==
- Fabio Testi as King Abdulaziz
- Bill Fellows as St John Philby
- Marco Foschi as King Abdulaziz (young)
- Mohammed Rafee
- Adnan Abdul Jalil as Judge
- Amjad Hussain
- Hamida Salim as King Abdulaziz's assistant

== Controversies ==
The depiction of the founder of the kingdom of Saudi Arabia draws criticism by the Saudi royal family and some of the family's allies in the western countries. Its release came amidst the deterioration of relations between Saudi Arabia and Syria due to the Syrian civil war, in which Riyadh backed Syrian opposition against the Syrian government.

Najdat Anzour who directed the film is the son of the Syrian pioneer of Arab cinema, Ismail Anzour. Although Najdat's reputation rest primarily on the production of epic TV series about important episodes in Islamic history and West Asia, he is also known for controversial political topics. His latest, King of the Sands, falls into that category.

At a press conference, on 18 April 2012, the director reported that he has already received threats of lawsuits by unidentified parties trying to prevent the film's release.

Saudi Arabian authorities reacted strongly to the film. Talal bin Abdulaziz Al Saud, son of Abdulaziz Al Saud and a senior member of the Saudi royal family, described the film as a great disrespect to the kingdom's founder. He said that “We have already made contacts with Bashar al Assad via a mutual friend to bring the screening of the movie to an end in the Arab country”. He also described Najdat Anzour as director of sexual jihad or Jihad al-Nikah.

=== Death threats ===
Anzour said he has received death threats over the film.

On 20 December 2013, Syrian movie director Najdat Anzour said he holds the Saudi government responsible for any harm that might come to him and his staff who joined him in the making of King of the Sands, a movie critical of Saudi Arabia.

After the movie was screened in Damascus, a Saudi cleric, Adnan al-Ayed issued a fatwa authorizing the killing of Anzour as "condonable and necessary". The preacher is said to have justified his fatwa by claiming that the director, Najdat Anzour, has insulted Islam by attacking the kingdom's founder through his film.

=== Attempted ban ===
A Saudi royal have attempted to ban the King of the Sands movie from screening in other countries. The film was shown in Damascus, despite attempts from a Saudi prince to have it banned in Syria. There is no report about public show of the movie in any other countries but a mixed reports about a private screening in London, Britain.
