= FRED Film Radio =

FRED (Film Radio Entertainment & Dialogue)
- London; England

Programming
- Languages: English, Italian, German, Polish, Spanish, French, Portuguese, Romanian, Slovenian, Chinese, Korean, Japanese, Arabic, Bulgarian, Croatian, Latvian, Danish, Hungarian, Dutch, Greek, Czech, Lithuanian, Slovac, Icelandic, Sardinian

History
- First air date: August 2011

Links
- Website: www.fred.fm

FRED (acronym for Film Radio Entertainment & Dialogue) is a London-based multichannel internet radio station, focusing on the world of independent cinema and international film festivals. FRED's mission is to promote and convey the unique and extraordinary experience of attending film festivals and at the same time spread the passion for independent cinema, in different languages, among different cultures.

It provides in-depth information and targeted entertainment around the industry, hence its tagline "The Festival Insider".

FRED broadcasts online, via apps on mobile telephones and other mobile devices and its content is also available to download as a podcast from the most popular podcast platforms.

== History ==
FRED was launched by its founder, Federico Spoletti, at the Venice International Film Festival in August 2011. initially with three channels: one in English, one in Italian and FRED Extra, which broadcasts press conferences and seminars. FRED has since expanded to 29 channels; 25 language channels, adding German, Polish, Spanish, French, Portuguese, Romanian, Slovenian, Chinese, Korean, Japanese, Arabic, Bulgarian, Croatian, Latvian, Danish, Hungarian, Dutch, Greek, Czech, Lithuanian, Slovac and Icelandic to the original English and Italian channels. It also broadcasts in the minority language Sardinian (Sardu) and has expanded its sector specific channels, adding FRED Industry, FRED Education and FRED Entertainment to the original FRED Extra.

FRED frequently broadcasts from festivals around the world, from the niche, to the larger, more internationally recognised festivals, including Cannes, Berlin, Venice, London, Turin, Rome, Tribeca, and Sydney. It is now the official international web station of Venice International Film Festival and it covers all the different festival sections, with additional media partnerships with the Venice Production Bridge, as well as the independent sections "Giornate degli Autori" and International Critics Week. The list of FRED's current or past media partnerships includes Torino Film Festival, Taormina Film Fest, Spanish London Film Festival, Cinema du Reel, Berlinale Talents, Talents Sarajevo, Young Audience Awards, Europa Distribution, Filming Italy Los Angeles, Sydney Film Festival and Lovers Film Festival.

== Programmes ==
The Soup of The Day: a morning show about film festivals, news from the world of cinema, TV series and much more;

Big Fred Tuesday: a weekly round-up of all things related to cinema, featuring news from the world of film and interviews with various international guests;

Wicip: the first project for the international promotion of Italian cinema written, produced and directed by women;

The Dream Syndicate: a podcast in collaboration with the National Union of Italian Film Critics;

Accessible Cinema: a program on media accessibility, on how cinema and live entertainment are made accessible to people with sensory disabilities.

FRED is actively involved in projects about media accessibility and is partner with Media For All, a Transmedia Research Group which focuses on various forms of audiovisual translation and media accessibility, quality and technology, and with ARSAD, Advanced Research Seminar on Audio Description.

== Projects ==
FRED launched the multilingual and multicultural "Fred at School" project in 2015, partly financed by the European Commission Creative Europe, with the purpose of educating young people in film literacy and developing new audiences for European cinema. It focused on secondary school students in European schools, inclusive of students with sight or hearing impairments through the use of subtitles or audio description. The students reviewed four films shortlisted by the European Parliament's Lux Prize competition. They then broadcast their thoughts and reviews on the relevant FRED radio platforms and chose an overall winner.

== FRED Award ==
The FRED Award is a special recognition awarded to actors, directors and industry professionals who promote independent cinema and intercultural exchange.

Here is the list of the winners:

2025	Dag Johan Haugerud
2024	Luca Marinelli
2023	Lola Dueñas, Richard Linklater
2022	Alessandro Borghi, Céline Sciamma, Tessa Thompson
2021	Alba Rohrwacher
2020	Jasmine Trinca, Matt Dillon
2019	Haifaa al-Mansour
2018	Willem Dafoe
2017	Pablo Larraín
2016	Joachim Lafosse
