= In Your Hands (2007 film) =

2007 film

- Directed by: Peter Del Monte
- Starring: Kasia Smutniak; Marco Foschi
- Cinematography: Marco Carosi
- Music by: Paolo Silvestri
- Release date: 2007
- Country: Italy
- Language: Italian

In Your Hands (Italian: Nelle tue mani) is a 2007 Italian drama film directed by Peter Del Monte. It entered the Panorama section at the 2007 Turin International Film Festival.

== Cast ==
- Kasia Smutniak: Mavi
- Marco Foschi: Teo
- Luisa De Santis: Madre di Teo
- Severino Saltarelli: Padre di Teo
- Luciano Bartoli: Padre di Mavi
- Alba Rohrwacher: Carla
