= Pius XII: Under the Roman Sky =

- Written by: Fabrizio Bettelli; Francesco Arlanch; Gianmario Pagano
- Directed by: Christian Duguay
- Starring: James Cromwell; Alessandra Mastronardi; Marco Foschi
- Composer: Andrea Guerra
- Countries of origin: Italy; Germany
- Original language: English

Production
- Producers: Luca Bernabei; Martin Choroba
- Cinematography: Fabrizio Lucci
- Editors: David Yardley; Lorenzo Fanfani

Original release
- Network: Rai 1
- Release: 2010

Pius XII: Under the Roman Sky (Italian: Sotto il cielo di Roma, German: Pius XII., also known just as Under the Roman Sky) is a 2010 Italian-German television film directed by Christian Duguay and starring James Cromwell, Alessandra Mastronardi and Marco Foschi. The film is set during the Nazi German occupation of Rome, between September 1943 and June 1944.

== Plot ==
Italy signed the Armistice of Cassibile on September 3, 1943.

Davide proposes to Miriam, but she declines to marry him.

The Jewish community in Rome acquiesces to give the Nazi troops 50 kilograms of gold.

During his tenure as the Pope, Pius XII vacillates in explicitly naming and condemning the racialist policies of Nazi leaders. His encyclicals like Summi Pontificatus are nuanced.

Fears grow that the Nazi military leaders might abduct Pope Pius XII as one military commander reminds another that Napoleon abducted Pope Pius VI.

== Cast ==
- James Cromwell as Pope Pius XII
- Alessandra Mastronardi as Miriam
- Marco Foschi as Davide
- Miguel Herz-Kestranek as Pankratius Pfeiffer
- Ettore Bassi as Marco
- Andrea Tidona as Armando
- Vincent Riotta as Dante Cimino
- Margot Sikabonyi as Nadia
- Ken Duken as Danneker
- Holger Daemgen as Stahel
- Mathias Herrmann as Karl Wolff
- Heinz Trixner as Weiszacker
- Cesare Bocci as Giovanni Battista Montini
- Christine Neubauer as Sister Pascalina
- Fiorella Migliore as Lia
- Nathalie Rapti-Gomez as Bianca

== Controversies ==
The film raised several controversies because of its portrait of Pope Pius XII and its historical inaccuracies. Chief rabbi of Rome Riccardo Di Segni described the film as "a propagandistic piece of crap, an apologetic work" which was "full of errors and inaccuracies" and "absolutory on the choices, events and silences of the papacy of Pius XII". Writer Corrado Augias was among the most critical about the TV-movie, describing it as a fiction whose only purpose was "to sketch a figure as best as possible in preparation for sainthood", and underling some major historical falsehoods such as a peaceful retreat of Nazi Germans thanks to Vatican pressure, ignoring several massacres such as La Storta massacre, and that Pope Pius XII personally intervened to avoid the raid on the Roman Ghetto.

Producer Luca Bernabei acknowledged some inaccuracies but defended the film, claiming it was not to be intended as a documentary, while screenwriters Fabrizio Bettelli and Francesco Arlanch contended that "our purpose was to write a story, not to make a historical judgment".
