= Moglie e marito =

2017 film

- Directed by: Simone Godano
- Written by: Giulia Louise Steigerwalt
- Produced by: Roberto Sessa; Matteo Rovere
- Starring: Pierfrancesco Favino; Kasia Smutniak
- Cinematography: Michele D'Attanasio
- Edited by: Davide Vizzini
- Music by: Andrea Farri
- Production companies: Picomedia; Groenlandia; Warner Bros. Entertainment Italia
- Distributed by: Warner Bros. Pictures
- Release date: 12 April 2017
- Running time: 101 minutes
- Country: Italy
- Language: Italian

Moglie e marito is a 2017 Italian romantic comedy film directed by Simone Godano.

== Cast ==
- Pierfrancesco Favino - Andrea
- Kasia Smutniak - Sofia
- Marta Gastini - Maria
- Andrea Bruschi - Brancati
