= Stana Cerović =

Montenegrin sworn virgin

- Born: 1 January 1936; Šavnik, Yugoslavia (now Montenegro)
- Died: 1 August 2016 (aged 80); Montenegro
- Known for: Believed incorrectly to be the last Montenegrin sworn virgin

Stana Cerović (1936–August 1, 2016) was a Montenegrin sworn virgin in rural Montenegro. He was part of the practice that permitted Albanian and Montenegrin people who were assigned female at birth to take on the gender role of men. By the time of his death, he was known, incorrectly, as the last such virgin in the country.

== Biography ==
Stana Cerović was born in 1936 in a tiny village near Šavnik, Montenegro, as the daughter of Anda and Milivoj Cerović. He had four sisters and two brothers. Both brothers died in childhood, and Cerović promised his father that he would continue to look after the family and live as a man. He began dressing as a man, and only socialised with men. Cerović began to smoke when he was five, and worked in the fields on his father's farm at seven. At a young age his mother was resistant of the masculine qualities that Cerovic's father was reinforcing, and before Cerovic's oath was taken, his mother continuously tried to change his dressing, and the chores he carried out. Cerović learned traditionally male skills, including being taught to shoot by his father.

Cerović showed a passion for hunting and shooting throughout his life, and typically joined the men on their wolf hunts, despite not having a hunting license. When a shooting club was founded in a nearby village, he applied for membership, but was turned down. He later showed up at a tournament organized by the club, and after seeing all the men miss the mark, he took it upon himself to leave the audience and grab a rifle. His first shot hit the mark proving that he was an excellent marksman.

This was all part of becoming a sworn virgin, a traditional Balkan cultural institution whereby females would take on the role of men and remain unmarried and without children throughout their life. Over time, this practice became accepted, because it was not regarded as conflicting with any of the three major religions practised in the Balkan region; Islam, Roman Catholicism, and Eastern Orthodox Christianity. Although many sworn virgins were forced into the practice due to familial needs, or blood feuds, Cerović was proud of his masculine identity and believed that it was nature that was at fault for his biological sex. He continued to live in his village for his entire life, raising cattle. When Cerović was around 17 years old, he became head of the household and remained in his parents′ home following their deaths, where he looked after his sisters. Following the death of his closest sister Vukosava, he became very distraught. Vukosava was the sister that typically helped him with most of his tasks in the fields, and they worked together often as brother and sister.

After being injured by one of his cattle in 2015, he sold them off. After being featured on Montenegrin television, offers of assistance to Cerović were made from around the country, such as travelogues offering him more exposure to the public eye, and news articles asking for monetary aid on his behalf. The local authorities arranged for him to be moved to a care home in 2016 at a house in Risan for the elderly poor. It was reported by Montenegrin state television in early August 2016 that he had died. At the time of his death, he was considered, incorrectly, to be the last sworn virgin in Montenegro.
