= Giovanna's Father =

- Directed by: Pupi Avati
- Written by: Pupi Avati; Antonio Avati
- Starring: Silvio Orlando; Francesca Neri; Ezio Greggio; Alba Rohrwacher
- Distributed by: Medusa Film
- Release date: August 31, 2008 (Venice Film Festival)
- Running time: 104 minutes
- Country: Italy
- Language: Italian

Giovanna's Father (Italian: Il papà di Giovanna) is a 2008 Italian drama film directed by Pupi Avati.

== Plot ==
In Bologna in the late 1930s, Michele Casali (Silvio Orlando) teaches design at the same institute where his daughter Giovanna (Alba Rohrwacher) studies. Michele is a loving father, but overprotective. He does not recognize the mental health problems of his daughter and cannot save her when she is committed to a mental institution after killing her best friend.

== Cast ==
- Silvio Orlando: Michele Casali
- Francesca Neri: Delia Casali
- Alba Rohrwacher: Giovanna Casali
- Ezio Greggio: Sergio Ghia
- Serena Grandi: Lella Ghia
- Manuela Morabito: Elide Traxler
- Gianfranco Jannuzzo: Preside Apolloni
- Paolo Graziosi: Andrea Taxler
- Valeria Bilello: Marcella Taxler
