= Paolo Giordano =

Italian writer (born 1982)

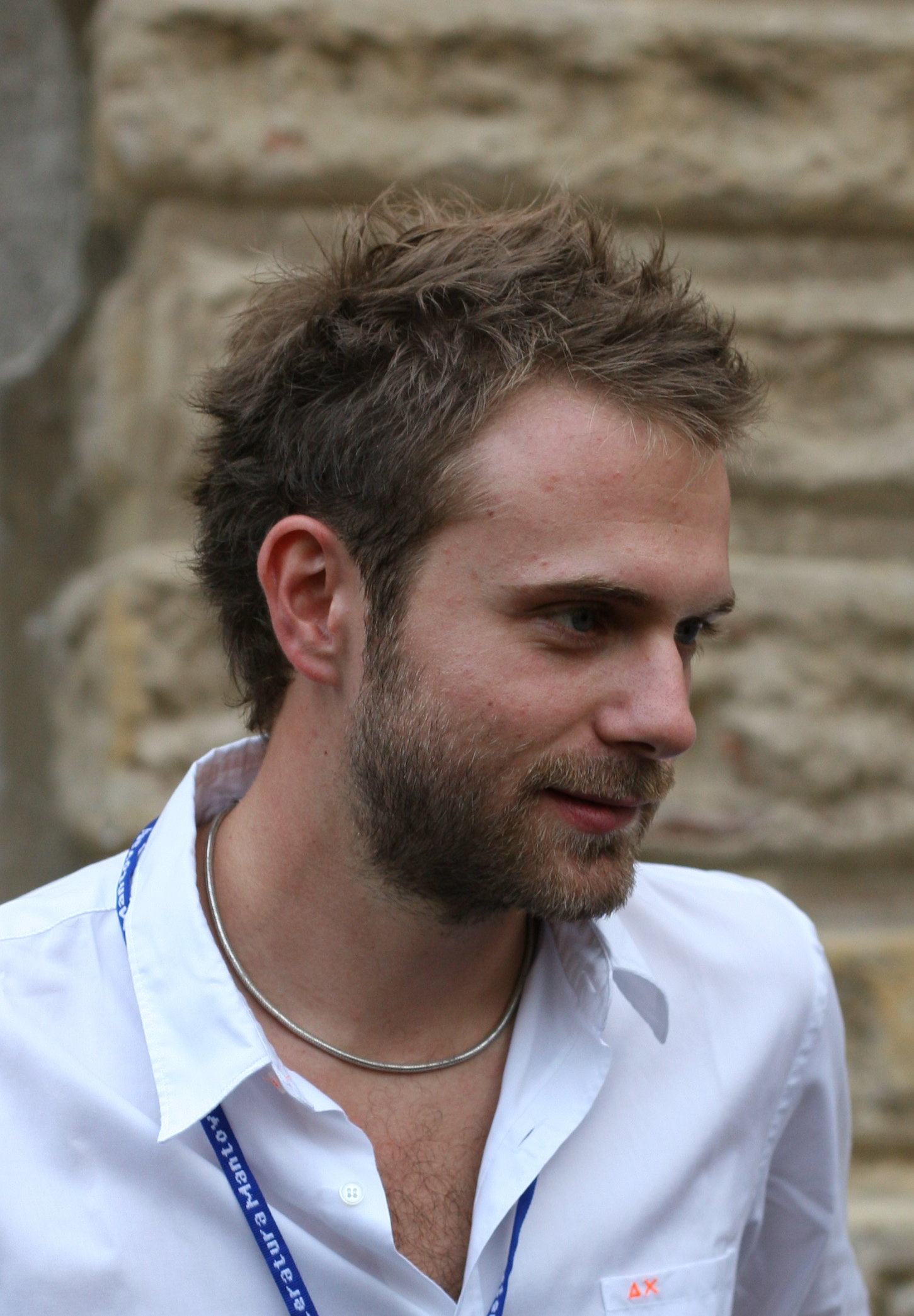
- Born: 19 December 1982 (age 43)
- Died: Turin, Italy
- Education: University of Turin (PhD)
- Occupation: Writer
- Notable work: The Solitude of Prime Numbers
- Awards: Strega Prize

Paolo Giordano (born 19 December 1982) is an Italian writer who won the Premio Strega literary award with his first novel The Solitude of Prime Numbers.

== Biography ==
Paolo Giordano was born on 19 December 1982, in Turin, Italy. He studied physics at the University of Turin and holds a PhD in theoretical particle physics. The Solitude of Prime Numbers, his first novel, has sold more than a million copies and was translated into thirty languages.

The Italian-language film based on the novel was released in September 2010.

Giordano's 2020 book How Contagion Works is one of the first to have been written on the COVID-19 pandemic and warns of the danger of authoritarianism.

== Bibliography ==
- 2008: The Solitude of Prime Numbers (published in Italian as La solitudine dei numeri primi)
- 2012: The Human Body (published in Italian as Il corpo umano)
- 2014: Like Family (published in Italian as Il nero e l'argento)
- 2018: Heaven and Earth (published in Italian as Divorare il cielo)
- 2020: How Contagion Works (published in Italian as Nel contagio)
- 2022: Tasmania

== Filmography ==
As writer

- We Are Who We Are (2020)
- Dry (2022)

== Awards ==
- 2008: Strega Prize (The Solitude of Prime Numbers)
- 2008: Premio Campiello for a first novel (The Solitude of Prime Numbers)
