= Sworn Virgin (film) =

2015 film by Laura Bispuri

- Theatrical film poster
- Original title: Vergine giurata
- Directed by: Laura Bispuri
- Screenplay by: Francesca Manieri
- Based on: Vergine giurata by Elvira Dones
- Starring: Alba Rohrwacher; Flonja Kodheli; Lars Eidinger; Luan Jaha; Bruno Shllaku; Ilire Vinca; Drenica Selimaj; Emily Ferratello
- Cinematography: Vladan Radovic
- Edited by: Carlotta Cristiani; Jacopo Quadri
- Music by: Nando Di Cosimo
- Production companies: Vivo Film; Colorado Film; Bord Cadre; The Match Factory; Era Film
- Distributed by: The Match Factory; Strand Releasing
- Release dates: 12 February 2015 (Berlin); 19 March 2015 (Italy)
- Running time: 90 minutes
- Countries: Italy; Switzerland; Germany; Albania; Kosovo
- Languages: Italian; Albanian

Sworn Virgin (Italian: Vergine giurata, Albanian: Burrnesha) is a 2015 internationally co-produced drama film directed by Laura Bispuri. It was screened in the main competition section of the 65th Berlin International Film Festival.

== Plot ==
Hana Doda, still a girl, escapes from her destiny of being a wife and a servant, a future imposed on women in the harsh mountains of Albania. Following his uncle's guide, she appeals to the old law of the Kanun, which gives women, taking an oath of eternal virginity, the chance to embrace a rifle and live free as men. For everybody Hana becomes Mark, a "sworn virgin".

But something alive pulses and frets under these new clothes. Her choice becomes her prison and those immense mountains seem so narrow now. Mark decides to set out on journey, too long put off. She leaves her land and arrives in Italy, where a new journey begins; a continuous and subtle path, crossing the line of two far away and different worlds: Albania and Italy, past and present, masculine and feminine.

Slowly Mark discovers her body again. She experiences the vertigo of touching other bodies and she finds caring, loving people life had denied her. She opens up to an unexpected and prohibited love's chance.

Mark rediscovers Hana, finally piecing back together the two souls that for years have lived inside her body. She is reborn as a new, free and complete creature.

== Cast ==
- Alba Rohrwacher as Mark/Hana
- Flonja Kodheli as Lila
- Lars Eidinger as Bernhard
- Luan Jaha as Stjefen
- Bruno Shllaku as Gjergj
- Ilire Vinca as Katrina
- Drenica Selimaj as Little Hana
- Emily Ferratello as Jonida

== Reception ==
=== Italian Critical Response ===
The reception from Italian critics was very positive. According to Andrea Chimento from Il Sole 24 Ore, the film is "an interesting reflection on sexuality and the desire to avoid any form of repression". Michele Faggi of the indie-eye.it magazine writes that it is "a silent and extremely tough excavation". Daniel Montignani on Paper Street writes that "Laura Bispuri [...] prepares and outlines for Hana a slow, upward journey, shaping it with tireless and refined subtraction, even when she looks directly into the discomfort in the eyes and in the weakest and most suffering expressions of the protagonist."

Davide Turrini from Il Fatto Quotidiano and Aldo Spiniello on Sentieri Selvaggi recognize in this debut work the influence of the Dardenne brothers, especially in the "autonomous and stubborn direction with a handheld camera obstinately following behind the protagonist's shoulders" that "captures the fears, uncertainties, hopes, and emotions, focusing solely on movements, gestures, and external attitudes" of "a tough Alba Rohrwacher". It is precisely "the astonishing performance of Alba Rohrwacher "that is "the film's strength," says Paolo Mereghetti in Corriere della Sera. The actress is "absolutely believable in her transformation from woman to man. [...] Her new 'gender' is visible in her face, her eyes, her voice, as if she had truly changed her soul deeply."

Goffredo Fofi in Internazionale called the film "a hope for the Italian cinema."

=== International Critical Response ===
Sworn Virgin has an approval rating of 71% on review aggregator website Rotten Tomatoes, based on 17 reviews, and an average rating of 7.2/10. Metacritic assigned the film a weighted average score of 70 out of 100, based on 12 critics, indicating "generally favorable reviews".

Laura Bispuri's film premiered at the 2015 Berlin International Film Festival as the only Italian film in competition. The film received a very warm reception from both the audience and international critics present at the festival. Deborah Young for The Hollywood Reporter spoke of the film in highly positive terms, calling it "an excellent debut. Bispuri has a remarkable talent for portraying physicality on screen."

Guy Lodge in Variety writes: "A sensitive, deliberate debut feature," praising Alba Rohrwacher's performance, "who supports the duality of the character, portraying Hana-Mark with great skill. A figure who never feels comfortable in their own skin."

Jessica Kiang on IndieWire writes: "In her impressive debut feature, writer/director Bispuri uses this unusual, specific tradition to investigate much broader issues of gender identity, self-image and cultural indoctrination, while also delivering a touching personal portrait of tentative liberation."

=== Awards and nominations ===
- 2015 - David di Donatello
  - Nomination to Best Emerging Director Award to Laura Bispuri
  - Nomination to Best Actress to Alba Rohrwacher
  - Nomination to Best Photography to Vladan Radovic
- 2015 - Globo D'Oro
  - Best First Feature Film to Laura Bispuri
- 2015 - Berlin International Film Festival
  - Nomination to the Golden Bear to Laura Bispuri
  - Nomination for Best First Feature Award to Laura Bispuri
  - Nomination to the Teddy Award to Laura Bispuri
- 2015 - Tribeca Film Festival
  - Nora Ephron Prize to Laura Bispuri
- 2015 - San Francisco International Film Festival
  - New Director Prize to Laura Bispuri
  - Golden Gate Award to Laura Bispuri
- 2015 - AFI Fest
  - Nomination to New Auteurs Award to Laura Bispuri
- 2015 - Off Camera International Festival of Independent Cinema (Kracow)
  - FIPRESCI Jury Award to Laura Bispuri
- 2015 - Hong Kong International Film Festival
  - Golden Firebird Award to Laura Bispuri
  - Nomination to FIPRESCI Prize to Laura Bispuri
- 2015 - Haifa International Film Festival
  - Nomination for Best International Film to Laura Bispuri
- 2015 - Mezipatra Queer Film Festival
  - Gran Jury Prize to Laura Bispuri
- 2015 - Molodist Kyiv International Film Festival
  - Best LGBTQ Film to Laura Bispuri
- 2015 - First Youth Firm Festival
  - Gran Jury Prize - Feature Film to Laura Bispuri
- 2015 - 20th Forum of European Cinema ORLEN Cinergia (Poland)
  - Cristal Boat Award for Best European First Feature to Laura Bispuri
- 2015 - Festival International du Film de Femmes de Salé
  - Jury Prize to Laura Bispuri
- 2015 - Alexandria Mediterranean Countries Film Festival
  - Best Film Prize to Laura Bispuri
- 2015 - Bobbio Film Festival
  - Emerging Youth Award to Laura Bispuri
- 2015 - Dolly D'Oro Giuseppe De Santis
  - Dolly D'Oro Giuseppe De Santis to Laura Bispuri
- 2015 - Ortigia Film Festival
  - Audience Prize to Laura Bispuri
  - Best Film to Laura Bispuri

== See also ==
- Balkan sworn virgins

== Additional reading ==
- The last of Albania's 'sworn virgins' - story about real Albanian Sworn Virgins
