= Come Undone (film) =

- Directed by: Silvio Soldini
- Written by: Silvio Soldini; Doriana Leondeff; Angelo Carbone
- Produced by: Lionello Cerri; Ruth Waldburger
- Starring: Pierfrancesco Favino; Alba Rohrwacher; Giuseppe Battiston
- Cinematography: Ramiro Civita
- Edited by: Carlotta Cristiani
- Music by: Giovanni Venosta
- Production companies: Lumiere & Co. Vega Film; Radiotelevisione svizzera
- Distributed by: Warner Bros. Pictures
- Release dates: 15 February 2010 (Berlin Film Festival); 30 April 2010 (Italy)
- Running time: 126 minutes
- Country: Italy
- Language: Italian

Come Undone (Italian: Cosa voglio di più) is a 2010 erotic drama film directed by Italian director Silvio Soldini. It tells a story of a woman named Anna who have passionate relationship with a man who are each in a relationship.

== Plot ==
Anna (Alba Rohrwacher) works at an insurance company and is married to Alessio (Giuseppe Battiston) who wants to have a baby. She then happens to meet Domenico (Pierfrancesco Favino), headwaiter at a local restaurant who turned out to be a married man with two children. The two start a passionate relationship, but their personal lives get in the way.

== Cast ==
- Alba Rohrwacher as Anna
- Pierfrancesco Favino as Domenico
- Giuseppe Battiston as Alessio, Anna's husband
- Teresa Saponangelo as Miriam, Domenico's wife
- Fabio Troiano as Bruno
- Tatiana Lepore as Bianca
- Adriana De Guilmi as Anna's mother
- Gigio Alberti as Anna's boss
- Ninni Bruschetta as Domenico's brother

== Awards ==
- Cabourg Film Festival 2010: Grand Prix
