= Anna Negri =

Italian film director and screenwriter (born 1964)

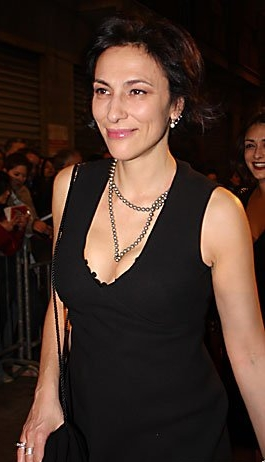
- Born: 9 December 1964 (age 61); Venice, Italy
- Occupations: Film director, screenwriter

Anna Negri (Italian: [ˈneːɡri]; born 9 December 1964) is an Italian film director and screenwriter.

== Biography ==
Born in Venice, she is the daughter of the Marxist sociologist and political philosopher Antonio Negri. After directing several short films, Negri made her feature film debut in 1999 with In the Beginning There Was Underwear, that was screened in the "Forum" section at the 49th Berlin International Film Festival. In the following years she worked in television, directing some episodes of the soap opera Un posto al sole and several TV movies. In 2008 she directed the mockumentary Good Morning Heartache, which entered the World Dramatic Competition at the 2008 Sundance Film Festival.

In 2009 Feltrinelli released her autobiography, Con un piede impigliato nella storia ("A foot stuck in History").

In 2018, she directed, with Andrea De Sica, the first season of Baby, an Italian original series produced by Netflix. In 2021 she directed, with Leonardo D'Agostini, the first season of Luna Park, a Netflix original written by Isabella Aguilar.

In 2025, she directed Toni, my Father, a documentary about her relationship with her father, Antonio Negri, that was released in theaters. The film premiered in the Giornate degli Autori section of the 82nd Venice Film Festival.
