= Agata and the Storm =

- Directed by: Silvio Soldini
- Starring: Licia Maglietta; Giuseppe Battiston; Emilio Solfrizzi
- Cinematography: Arnaldo Catinari
- Release date: 2004
- Running time: 125 minutes
- Country: Italy
- Language: Italian

Agata and the Storm (Italian: Agata e la tempesta) is a 2004 Italian comedy film directed by Silvio Soldini.

== Cast ==
- Licia Maglietta - Agata Torregiani
- Giuseppe Battiston - Romeo D'Avanzo
- Emilio Solfrizzi - Gustavo Torregiani
- Marina Massironi - Ines Silvestri
- Claudio Santamaria - Nico
- Giselda Volodi - Maria Libera
- Ann Eleonora Jørgensen - Pernille Margarethe Kierkegaard
- Remo Remotti - Generoso Rambone
- Monica Nappo - Daria
