= Hungry Hearts (2014 film) =

2014 Italian drama film

- Italian film poster
- Directed by: Saverio Costanzo
- Screenplay by: Saverio Costanzo
- Based on: Il bambino indaco by Marco Franzoso
- Produced by: Mario Gianani; Lorenzo Mieli
- Starring: Adam Driver; Alba Rohrwacher; Roberta Maxwell
- Cinematography: Fabio Cianchetti
- Edited by: Francesca Calvelli
- Music by: Nicola Piovani
- Distributed by: Radiant Films International
- Release dates: 31 August 2014 (Venice); 15 January 2015 (Italy)
- Running time: 109 minutes
- Country: Italy
- Language: English

Hungry Hearts is a 2014 English-language Italian drama film directed by Saverio Costanzo. It was selected to compete for the Golden Lion at the 71st Venice International Film Festival. At Venice, Adam Driver and Alba Rohrwacher won the Volpi Cup for Best Actor and Best Actress respectively. It was also screened in the Special Presentations section of the 2014 Toronto International Film Festival.

== Plot ==
Jude (Adam Driver) is a gentle, pragmatic engineer living in New York City. In unfortunate circumstances, he becomes trapped in a restaurant bathroom with Mina (Alba Rohrwacher), who works at the Italian embassy. Despite this equally awkward and funny first encounter, Jude and Mina begin a relationship and move in together.

A few months later, Mina wakes to a phone call from her employer. They notify her that she has been transferred and will be relocated to her native Italy in two months, separating her from Jude. Upon learning of the impending transfer, Jude is deeply upset, and later in the day initiates a sexual encounter. Against Mina's wishes, Jude ejaculates inside of her, and Mina later discovers she is pregnant. Jude and Mina are married at a beachside cafe in Brighton Beach. After the reception, a man shoots a deer on the boardwalk outside. Mina is distraught after witnessing the unnecessary and careless death of an animal, and is bothered by recurring nightmares about it.

As the pregnancy begins, Mina fails to maintain a stable diet. At a friend's art exhibit, Mina wanders outside to the patio and faints. She is taken to the hospital, where an ultrasound is performed and Mina and Jude are informed that their baby is not receiving adequate nutrients to grow. The couple return home, where Mina expresses a distrust of modern medicine. She decides to employ only alternative medicine, going so far as to visit a psychic who informs Mina that her fetus is an Indigo child. Trusting her maternal instincts, Jude does not initially intervene in Mina's self-inflicted undernourishment and shunning of western treatment options.

Mina continues to undernourish herself and her unborn child, and when it is time for her to give birth, contractions do not begin due to her malnourishment. As the baby goes into distress, Jude takes Mina to the hospital where a c-section is performed against her wishes. The baby boy is weak and must begin his life inside an incubator.

Seven months later, Mina has not allowed her son to be taken outside the apartment. Because of her growing obsession with purity and cleanliness, Mina does not allow outsiders to touch her baby without first washing their hands, requires all cell phones be left at the bottom of the entryway stairs, and keeps the infant on a vegan diet. She continues to renounce modern medicine. While Mina is gone, Jude takes the baby to a doctor who informs him that the baby is severely malnourished, and at risk of retarded growth or death. Jude returns home and confronts Mina about her parenting style. The rift between the two grows larger. Mina is horrified when she returns home to find Jude feeding their baby a meat product, and after an argument during which Jude slaps Mina, she agrees to allow Jude to take charge of feeding the baby.

After two weeks of following the prescribed diet, the baby has not gained any weight. Jude is suspicious of Mina, who takes the baby away after every meal. Jude discovers that Mina, gaunt and withered herself, has been feeding the baby an anti-nutrient oil, preventing him from absorbing food. Jude finds excuses throughout each day to take the infant outside and feed him in secret. While visiting, Jude's mother becomes aware of the situation and urges Jude to take action. He visits a lawyer, who advises him to take the infant somewhere he can be safe, and obtains a court order prohibiting Mina from being the child's primary caretaker.

While Mina is distracted, Jude gives the baby boy to his mother, who takes provisional care of him while Mina is meant to recuperate. Jude and Mina, now at seemingly irreparable odds with each other, visit their child often. Jude's mother grows increasingly uncomfortable with Mina's disturbing physical and mental state. During an unannounced visit, Mina attempts to forcibly take her child home with her, but Jude and his mother prevent this. In a brief struggle for the baby between Mina and Jude, Mina is knocked into a door frame, bruising and splitting her lip. Mina leaves the house in quiet frustration.

The following night Jude is woken by flashing lights outside his mother's house. A police officer knocks on the door, informing Jude that he has been accused of battery. Mina appears from behind the officer, accompanied by other authorities, and takes their child back to New York City despite Jude and his mother's desperate pleadings.

Mina takes the infant to the boardwalk where she and Jude were married, and the two spend the day quietly observing the ocean.

In the night Mina wakes upon hearing someone enter the apartment. An unseen person enters the bedroom and stands face-to-face with Mina. The screen cuts to black as a gunshot sounds.

Jude is shown running down a street illuminated by police lights. He turns into a police station, urgently asking about the whereabouts of his son. The authorities hand Jude the baby. In the station, Jude sobs while holding his child. A police interview is shown revealing that Jude's mother killed Mina to ensure the safety of her grandson, accepting the punishment she will receive as a result.

In the final scene, Jude and his son walk along the beach. The child, now healthy and of school age, holds his father's hand.

== Cast ==
- Adam Driver as Jude
- Alba Rohrwacher as Mina
- Roberta Maxwell as Anne
- Jake Weber as Dr. Bill
- Natalie Gold as Jennifer
- Victor Williams as Social Worker
- Victoria Cartagena as Monica

== Reception ==
Critical reception for Hungry Hearts has been mixed, and the film holds a score of 63% on review aggregator Rotten Tomatoes, based on 38 reviews with an average rating of 6.4/10. It holds a weighted average score of 44/100 on Metacritic, based on 15 critics, indicating "mixed to average reviews".

== Awards ==
Awards
Award	Category	Recipients and nominees	Result
71st Venice International Film Festival	Golden Lion	Saverio Costanzo	Nominated
71st Venice International Film Festival	Volpi Cup for Best Actor	Adam Driver	Won
71st Venice International Film Festival	Volpi Cup for Best Actress	Alba Rohrwacher	Won
71st Venice International Film Festival	Pasinetti Award for Best Actress	Alba Rohrwacher	Won
71st Venice International Film Festival	Special Pasinetti Award for Best Direction	Saverio Costanzo	Won
71st Venice International Film Festival	Cinema for UNICEF Award	Saverio Costanzo	Won
60th David di Donatello Awards	Best Film	Mario Gianani and Lorenzo Mieli	Nominated
60th David di Donatello Awards	Best Director	Saverio Costanzo	Nominated
60th David di Donatello Awards	Best Script	Saverio Costanzo	Nominated
60th David di Donatello Awards	Best Actress	Alba Rohrwacher	Nominated
60th David di Donatello Awards	Best Cinematography	Fabio Cianchetti	Nominated
60th David di Donatello Awards	Best Editing	Francesco Calvelli	Nominated
60th David di Donatello Awards	Best Score	Nicola Piovani	Nominated
55th Globi d'oro	Best Actress	Alba Rohrwacher	Won
30th Ciak d'oro	Best Producer	Mario Gianani and Lorenzo Mieli	Nominated
30th Ciak d'oro	Best Screenwriter	Saverio Costanzo	Nominated
30th Ciak d'oro	Best Cinematography	Fabio Cianchetti	Nominated
30th Ciak d'oro	Best Score	Nicola Piovani	Nominated
