= Finally Dawn =

2023 Italian period drama film

- Directed by: Saverio Costanzo
- Written by: Saverio Costanzo
- Produced by: Mario Gianani; Lorenzo Gangarossa
- Starring: Lily James; Rebecca Antonacci; Joe Keery; Rachel Sennott; Alba Rohrwacher; Willem Dafoe
- Cinematography: Sayombhu Mukdeeprom
- Music by: Massimo Martellotta
- Production companies: Wildside; Rai Cinema
- Distributed by: 01 Distribution
- Release dates: 1 September 2023 (Venice); 14 February 2024
- Running time: 142 minutes
- Country: Italy
- Languages: English; Italian

Finally Dawn (Italian: Finalmente l'alba) is a 2023 Italian period drama film written and directed by Saverio Costanzo and starring Lily James, Willem Dafoe and Joe Keery. Set in the Hollywood on the Tiber era of 1950s Rome, the film follows a long, intense night in an aspiring actress' career.

Finally Dawn premiered at the 80th Venice International Film Festival on 1 September 2023, where it was selected to compete for the Golden Lion, and was released in Italy on February 14, 2024, by 01 Distribution.

== Cast ==
- Lily James as Josephine Esperanto
- Rebecca Antonaci as Mimosa
- Joe Keery as Sean Lockwood
- Rachel Sennott as Nan Roth
- Alba Rohrwacher as Alida Valli
- Willem Dafoe as Rufus Priori
- Enzo Casertano as Rinaldo
- Giovanni Moschella as Ugo Montagna
- Michele Bravi as Singer ('Cantante en travesti')

== Production ==
On 29 August 2022, it was announced filming began in Italy. Filming wrapped on 15 October, after an eight-week shoot mainly in Cinecittà, Rome.

== Release ==
Finally Dawn premiered in competition at the 80th Venice International Film Festival on 1 September 2023. It was also invited to the 28th Busan International Film Festival and was screened in its World Cinema section on 8 October 2023. The film was released in theaters in Italy on 14 February 2024.

== Reception ==
On the review aggregator website Rotten Tomatoes, 38% of 21 critics' reviews are positive.

== Awards and nominations ==
Awards and nominations for Finally Dawn80th Venice International Film Festival
Category	Recipient(s)	Result	Ref.
Golden Lion	Saverio Costanzo	Nominated	
Marcello Mastroianni Award	Rebecca Antonaci	Nominated	
La Pellicola d'Oro Award	Massimiliano Kuveiller (Best Camera Operator)	Won	
