= Good Morning Heartache (film) =

2008 film by Anna Negri

- Theatrical release poster
- Riprendimi
- Directed by: Anna Negri
- Screenplay by: Anna Negri; Giovanna Mori
- Produced by: Francesca Neri; Claudio Amendola; Roberto Manni
- Starring: Alba Rohrwacher; Marco Foschi; Valentina Lodovini; Stefano Fresi; Alessandro Averone; Marina Rocco; Cristina Odasso; Francesca Cutolo; Massimo De Santis; Giulia Weber; Hossein Taheri
- Cinematography: Gian Enrico Bianchi
- Edited by: Ilaria Fraioli
- Music by: Dominik Scherrer
- Production company: Bess Movie
- Distributed by: Medusa Film
- Release date: 11 April 2008 (Italy)
- Running time: 93 minutes
- Country: Italy
- Language: Italian
- Box office: $278,471

Good Morning Heartache (Italian: Riprendimi) is a 2008 Italian drama film written by Giovanna Mori and Anna Negri and is directed by the latter. The film is a pseudo-documentary and a low-budget film that was shot in Rome.

== Cast ==
- Alba Rohrwacher as Lucia
- Marco Foschi as Giovanni
- Valentina Lodovini as Michela
- Stefano Fresi as Giorgio
- Alessandro Averone as Eros
- Marina Rocco as Tiziana
- Cristina Odasso as Mara
- Francesca Cutolo as Tosca
- Massimo De Santis as Peppe
- Hossein Taheri as Mario
- Giulia Weber as Sara

== Acknowledgments ==
=== Sundance Film Festival ===
The film was featured at the 2008 Sundance Film Festival with the creator of the film Anna Negri.

== Awards and nominations ==
- 2008 - Annecy Italian Film Festival
  - Best Actress Award: Alba Rohrwacher
- 2008 - Nastro d'Argento
  - Nominated for Best Actress: Alba Rohrwacher
- 2008 - Sulmonacinema Film Festival
  - Best Actress: Alba Rohrwacher
