= Laura Bispuri =

Italian film director and screenwriter

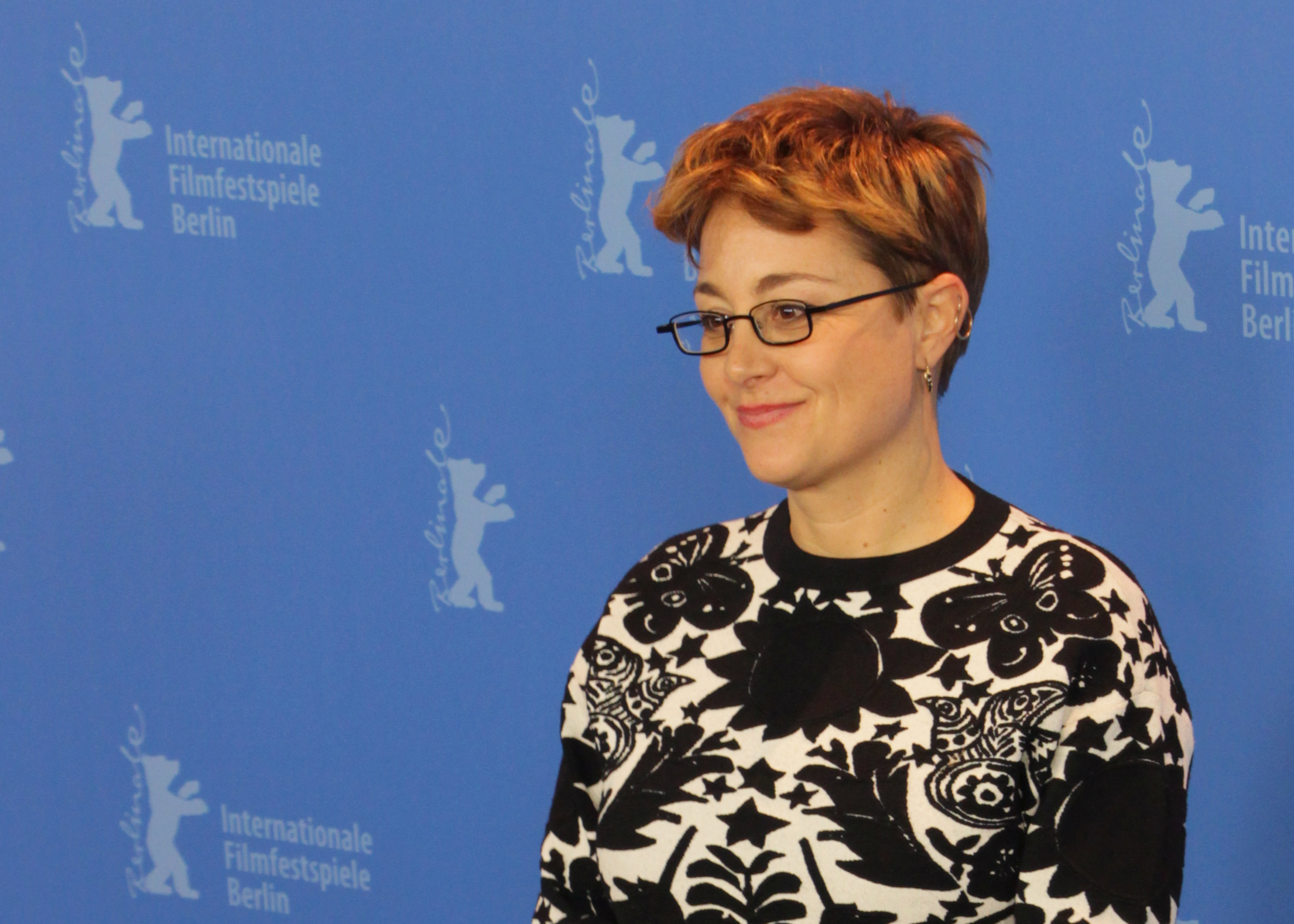
Laura Bispuri at Berlinale 2018

Laura Bispuri (Rome, August 20, 1977) is an Italian film director and screenwriter. Her career ranges from two films in competition at the Berlinale, to one in the official Orizzonti competition at the Venice Film Festival, to directing the fourth season of My Brilliant Friend, based on the novels by Elena Ferrante and produced by HBO and RAI.

== Biography ==
After graduating in Cinema at the Sapienza University of Rome, Bispuri attended the Fandango Lab Workshop, a school of cinema in Rome created by Domenico Procacci. In 2018 Variety listed her among the “10 European directors to watch out for”. In 2022 she was invited to the jury of the Orizzonti section of the Venice Film Festival.

== Career ==
=== Short films ===
In 2010, her short film Passing Time won the David di Donatello for Best Short Film and was selected among the eight best short films of the year by the Académie des Césars in Paris. In 2011, she was awarded the Nastro d’Argento as “Emerging Talent of the Year” for the short film Biondina.

=== Feature films ===
Her debut film Sworn Virgin (with Alba Rohrwacher and Lars Eidinger) was presented in Competition at the 65th Berlin International Film Festival in 2015. During development, the project had been selected at the Cannes Film Festival in the Atelier Cinéfondation. After Berlin, the film began a journey to festivals around the world, including the BFI London Film Festival in London and AFI Fest in Los Angeles, winning major awards, including the prestigious Nora Ephron Prize at the Tribeca Film Festival in New York, the New Director Prize and the Golden Gate New Directors Prize at the San Francisco International Film Festival, the Firebird Award at the Hong Kong International Film Festival, and the FIPRESCI Prize at the PK Off Camera in Krakow. Sworn Virgin also won the Globo D’oro for Best First Feature in Italy.

Her second feature film Daughter of Mine (with Valeria Golino, Alba Rohrwacher and Udo Kier) was presented in Competition at the 68th Berlin International Film Festival in 2018, and was then selected in major international festivals (BFI London Film Festival and AFI Fest), winning among others the Media Choice Award at the Shanghai International Film Festival and the Golden Anchor at the Haifa Film Festival.

Her third feature film, The Peacock's Paradise (2021), starring Dominique Sanda, Alba Rohrwacher, Maya Sansa, Tihana Lazovic, Leonardo Lidi, Fabrizio Ferracane, was screened at the Venice Film Festival in the official competition of Orizzonti. The movie won the Fice 2021 Award.

=== Television series ===
In 2024, she directed all ten episodes of the fourth and final season of My Brilliant Friend, based on the novels by Elena Ferrante and produced by HBO and RAI.

James Poniewozik from The New York Times praised the fourth and final season of My Brilliant Friend by writing: "Laura Bispuri, who directs every episode of the new season, conveys a brutal intimacy by holding on tight head shots of the actors. In this story of people who cannot escape their closeness, the viewer cannot either; the camera pushes you into the hot faces of anger, lust, grief. The series retains Ferrante’s prose in Lenù’s voice-over, but it also gives you sweat and tears and grimy streets whose air clings to your skin”.

Rebecca Nicholson, The Guardian, wrote about the last season "One of TV’s finest series in years reaches its end with a gorgeous finale. This Elena Ferrante adaptation is rich, sumptuous and deliciously overwrought – it truly is a wonder. [...] Each episode of My Brilliant Friend feels like a film in miniature. It takes a confident, artistic approach to depicting the passage of time, unfurling like a languid animal."

The season was nominated for the Critics Choice Awards in the Best Foreign Language Series category. It is also ranked among the Best TV Shows of 2024 by The New York Times.

== Filmography ==
=== Feature films ===
- Sworn Virgin (2015)
- Daughter of Mine (2018)
- The Peacock's Paradise (2021)

=== Short films ===
- Passing Time (2010)
- Salve regina (2010)
- Biondina (2011)

=== Television series ===
- My Brilliant Friend (2024)

== Awards and nominations ==
- David di Donatello
  - 2010 - Best Short Film to Passing Time
  - 2015 – Best Newcomer Director Award - Nomination to Sworn Virgin
- Nastro d’Argento
  - 2011 - Emerging Talent of the Year Award for Passing Time and Biondina
  - 2015 - Nomination to Best Newcomer Director for Sworn Virgin
  - 2018 - Nomination to Best Treatment for Daughter of Mine
- Globo d'oro
  - 2015 – Best First Feature to Sworn Virgin
- Berlin International Film Festival
  - 2015 – Nomination to the Golden Bear for Sworn Virgin
  - 2015 – Nomination to First Feature Award for Sworn Virgin
  - 2015 – Nomination to the Teddy Award for Sworn Virgin
  - 2018 – Nomination to the Golden Bear for Daughter of Mine
- Venice Film Festival
  - 2021 – Orizzonti Prize Nomination for The Peacock's Paradise
  - 2021 – Queer Lion Nomination for The Peacock's Paradise
- Tribeca Film Festival
  - 2015 – Nora Ephron Prize to ‘‘Sworn Virgin’’
- San Francisco International Film Festival
  - 2015 - New Director Prize to ‘‘Sworn Virgin’’
  - 2015 - Golden Gate Award to ‘‘Sworn Virgin’’
- AFI Fest
  - 2015 - Nomination to New Auteurs Award - ‘‘Sworn Virgin’’
- Off Camera International Festival of Independent Cinema (Kracow)
  - 2015 - FIPRESCI Jury Award to ‘‘Sworn Virgin’’
- Hong Kong International Film Festival
  - 2015 – Golden Firebird Award to ‘‘Sworn Virgin’’
  - 2015 - Nomination to FIPRESCI Prize - ‘‘Sworn Virgin’’
  - 2018 - Nomination to Young Cinema - ‘‘Daughter of Mine’’
- Haifa International Film Festival
  - 2015 - Nomination Best International Film - ‘‘Sworn Virgin’’
  - 2018 – Golden Anchor Competition Award to ‘‘Daughter of Mine’’
  - 2021 - Nomination Best International Film - ‘‘The Peacock’s Paradise’’
- Mezipatra Queer Film Festival
  - 2015 - Gran Jury Prize to ‘‘Sworn Virgin’’
- Molodist Kyiv International Film Festival
  - 2015 - Best LGBTQ Film to ‘‘Sworn Virgin’’
- First Youth Film Festival
  - 2015 - Gran Jury Prize – Feature Film to ‘‘Sworn Virgin’’
- 20th Forum of European Cinema ORLEN Cinergia (Poland)
  - 2015 - Cristal Boat Award for Best European First Feature to ‘‘Sworn Virgin’’
- Festival international du film de femmes de Salé
  - 2015 - Jury Prize to ‘‘Sworn Virgin’’
- Alexandria Mediterranean Countries Film Festival
  - 2015 - Best Film Prize to ‘‘Sworn Virgin’’
- Bobbio Film Festival
  - 2015 - Emerging Youth Award to ‘‘Sworn Virgin’’
- Dolly D’Oro Giuseppe De Santis
  - 2015 - Premio Dolly D’Oro Giuseppe De Santis to ‘‘Sworn Virgin’’
- Ortigia Film festival
  - 2015 – Audience Prize to ‘‘Sworn Virgin’’
  - 2015 – Best Film to ‘‘Sworn Virgin’’
- Shanghai International Film Festival
  - 2018 – Media Choice Award for Best Film to ‘‘Daughter of Mine’’
- Sydney Film Festival
  - 2018 - Nomination to the Sydney Film Prize - ‘‘Daughter of Mine’’
- BIF&ST
  - 2018 - Mariangela Melato Prize to the Main Actresses - ‘‘Daughter of Mine’’
- Premio Do Cinema Italiano
  - 2019 - Best Film to ‘‘Daughter of Mine’’
- FICE Award
  - 2021 – FICE Award to ‘‘The Peacock’s Paradise’’
- Critics Choice Awards
  - 2024 - Best Foreign Language Series Nomination for ‘‘My Brilliant Friend - Season 4’’
