= In Treatment (Italian TV series) =

- Genre: Psychological drama
- Based on: In Treatment by Rodrigo Garcia
- Starring: Sergio Castellitto; Barbora Bobuľová; Adriano Giannini; Licia Maglietta; Kasia Smutniak; Guido Caprino; Irene Casagrande; Francesco De Miranda; Maya Sansa; Michele Placido; Greta Scarano; Margherita Buy; Domenico Diele; Brenno Placido; Giulia Michelini; Giovanna Mezzogiorno
- Country of origin: Italy
- Original language: Italian
- No. of seasons: 3
- No. of episodes: 105

Production
- Running time: 22–30 minutes

Original release
- Network: Sky Cinema 1 (s. 1); Sky Atlantic (s. 2–3)
- Release: 1 April 2013 – 6 May 2017

In Treatment is an Italian psychological drama television series directed by Saverio Costanzo and starring Sergio Castellitto.

The series is a remake of the HBO TV series of the same name developed by Rodrigo Garcia, itself a remake of the Israeli series BeTipul (Hebrew: בטיפול), created by Hagai Levi.

The first season of the series was broadcast for the first time in Italy on Sky Cinema Uno from 1 April to 17 May 2013. The second season was broadcast on Sky Atlantic from 23 November 2015. The third and final season was broadcast from 25 March to 6 May 2017.

== Plot ==
The psychotherapy sessions of Dr. Giovanni Mari (Sergio Castellitto), who receives patients with various problems in his office from Monday to Thursday. On Fridays, he becomes a patient himself, undergoing sessions with his friend and mentor Anna (Licia Maglietta).

== Cast and characters ==
=== Main ===
- Sergio Castellitto as Dr. Giovanni Mari, a psychologist in his 50s.
- Barbora Bobuľová as Lea (season 1–2), Dr. Mari's patient struggling with marital crisis.
- Adriano Giannini as Pietro (season 1–2), Lea's husband and Dr. Mari's patient struggling with marital crisis.
- Licia Maglietta as Anna (season 1–2), Mari's therapist.
- Kasia Smutniak as Sara (season 1), Dr. Mari's patient who's secretly in love with him.
- Guido Caprino as Dario (season 1), Dr. Mari's patient. He is an undercover policeman.
- Irene Casagrande as Alice (season 1), Dr. Mari's patient struggling with suicide.
- Francesco De Miranda as Mattia (season 2), Pietro and Lea's son.
- Maya Sansa as Irene (season 2), Dr. Mari's former patient and a successful lawyer.
- Michele Placido as Guido (season 2), Dr. Mari's patient struggling with panic attacks.
- Greta Scarano as Elisa (season 2), Dr. Mari's patient struggling with depression due to her cancer.
- Margherita Buy as Rita (season 3), a famous actress and Dr. Mari's patient.
- Domenico Diele as Father Riccardo (season 3), a priest and Dr. Mari's patient.
- Brenno Placido as Luca (season 3), a homosexual man with a passion for photography.
- Giulia Michelini as Bianca (season 3), Dr. Mari's patient struggling with anxiety.
- Giovanna Mezzogiorno as Adele (season 3), Mari's new therapist.

=== Recurring ===
- Valeria Golino as Eleonora Mari, Dr. Mari's wife.
- Valeria Bruni Tedeschi as Irene (season 1), Alice's mother.
- Pier Giorgio Bellocchio as Sergio (season 1), Alice's father and Irene's husband.
- Rodolfo Bianchi as Vittorio (season 1–2), Dario's father.
- Alba Rohrwacher as Lavinia (season 2), Guido's daughter.
- Isabella Ferrari as Mara (season 2), Dr. Mari's ex-girlfriend.
- Daniele Antonini as Claudio (season 3), Bianca's husband.

== Production ==
The TV series is produced by Wildside with the collaboration of Sky Cinema and LA7, under the production of Lorenzo Mieli and Mario Gianani. The episodes are directed by the director Saverio Costanzo and written by Stefano Sardo, Alessandro Fabbri, Ludovica Rampoldi, Ilaria Bernardini and Giacomo Durzi .

Filming began in Rome on November 19, 2012 .

Rodolfo Bianchi, who plays Vittorio, Dario's father, dubbed the Italian voice for Gabriel Byrne in the American series .
