= Najdat Anzour =

Syrian director

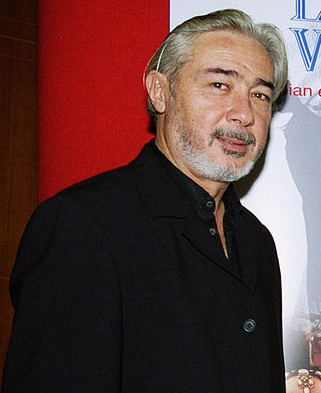
- Anzour in 2017

Speaker of the People's Assembly
- Acting; 21 July 2017 – 28 September 2017
- Preceded by: Hadiya Khalaf Abbas (As Speaker)
- Succeeded by: Hammouda Sabbagh (As Speaker)

Deputy Speaker of the People's Assembly
- In office 6 June 2016 – 11 August 2020
- Preceded by: Fahmi Hassan
- Succeeded by: Mohammad Akram al-Ajlani

Member of the People's Assembly
- In office 6 June 2016 – 12 December 2024
- Constituency: Aleppo City

Personal details
- Born: Najdat Ismail Anzour; 26 November 1954 (age 71) Aleppo, Second Syrian Republic
- Party: Independent
- Education: University of Aleppo (BS)
- Occupation: Television director
- Website: Najdat Anzour's Homepage

Najdat Ismail Anzour (Arabic: نجدت إسماعيل أنزور; born 26 November 1954) is a Syrian television and film director and politician. He served as Deputy Speaker of the People's Assembly from 2016 to 2020 and was an independent member of the Assembly from 2016 until 2024.

== Biography ==
Najdat Anzour was born in Aleppo on 26 November 1954 into a Sunni Muslim family of Circassian descent. His father Ismail Anzour was the director of Taht sama'a Dimashq (translates to : Under Damascus Skies), Syria's first silent film, in 1932. Although Najdat graduated as a mechanical engineer, he credits his father for inspiring his career in film directing.

Najdat created TV ads (numbering over 1,000), and later went into TV series, then films.

On 6 June 2016, Anzour was elected as Deputy Speaker of the Syrian Parliament together with Syria's first female Speaker of parliament, Hadiya Khalaf Abbas, Ph.D., who was elected by the People's Assembly to head the parliament.

On 21 July 2017, Najdat was appointed as an interim Speaker of the Syrian parliament.

== Television series ==
Anzour directed over 20 TV series with a distinctive style. They are mostly set in an ancient era, in the Arabian desert or oases. The series has more realistic fighting scenes and much night shooting. They often tell the story of tribal conflicts, honor, romance, etc. Normally, his work is aired in the Muslim fasting month of Ramadan, where TV viewing is at its peak in the Arab world.

- Al Kawaser
- Al Jawareh (The Predators).
- Romh Al Nar (Spear of Fire)
- Searching for Saladin
- The Last Cavalier
- Roof of the World (2007), based on Ibn Fadlan's tenth century travels and set in Scandinavia (which Ibn Fadlan actually never visited, having gone to Volga Bulgaria and Great Perm).
- Qamar Bani Hashim (The Moon of Hashim Tribe) (2008), the first ever television biopic drama series based on the life of the Islamic prophet, Muhammad, it is also known as "Muhammad: The Final Legacy".
- In the Presence of Absence (2011), a series that tells the biography of the Palestinian poet, Mahmoud Darwish

== Films ==
Some of his recent films are aired by the Dubai based Middle East Broadcasting Corporation and aim to end the terrorism committed by Muslim extremists. Although his work is supported by many Muslims, others object to his vilification of terrorist actions .

- Al-Hour al-Eyn (Beautiful Virgins) (2005) traces the lives of attackers, victims, and survivors of the November 2003 terrorist bombings of Riyadh, and challenged the popular belief among many terrorists that they would be rewarded with seventy-two beautiful virgins each in heaven. This film was viewed by an estimated fifty million people.
- "Renegades" (2006) is one episode is a series called Always by Hatem Ali. In Anzour's "Renegades" episode the subject is how the terrorists who bombed the London underground in 2005 were not true Muslims because they acted with violence. The episode also points out that good Muslims were killed by the attacks as well as innocent non-Muslims.
- King of the Sands (2013) is a history film in English which was criticised by Saudi house power and mass censorship not only in Saudi Arabia but also in countries who are allied with House of Saud in the Middle East and Western countries.
- "Fania wa tatabaddad (Mortal and Dispersing)" (2016), the story of an 11-year-old girl abducted by the Islamic State and then rescued by the forces of the Syrian Arab Army. The movie shows tortures and abuses operated by Daesh in its conquered territories.
- Re judiciary 2016 (in Arabic : رد القضاء)

=== Future films ===
Oppression: Years of Torment (Arabic:الظلم : سنوات العذاب) is film whose production was due to start in 2008. The film is about the Libyan national hero Omar Al-Mokhtar, was written by Muammar Gaddafi, and was announced to be directed by Anzour. High-profile actors including Anthony Hopkins, Kevin Spacey and Ben Kingsley have been courted, albeit without any current confirmation. At first Omar Sharif had been also announced to be in the cast playing Omar Al-Mokhtar. However, he withdrew later stating that he had other engagements as a pretext. The shooting of the film was announced to start on the Italian Tremiti islands on 14 April 2008 for 6 days , which is the same islands many Libyans where deported to during the Italian occupation of Libya. There are no recent indications, however, that filming ever commenced, and it appears that the project may be on hold.
