= Silvio Soldini =

Italian film director

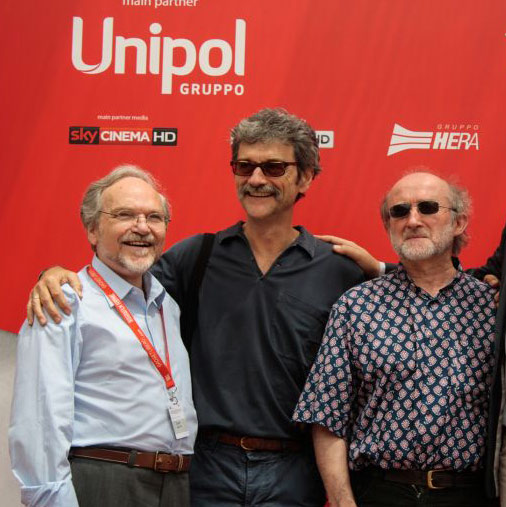
- Josef Weiss, Silvio Soldini, Alberto Casiraghy. Il fiume ha sempre ragione. 2016
- Born: 11 August 1958 (age 67); Milan, Italy
- Occupation: Film director

Silvio Soldini (born 1958, in Milan) is an Italian film director. Soldini has received 17 awards in his career and 32 nominations as of November 2015. His 2007 film Days and Clouds was selected for the main competition on the 30th Moscow International Film Festival.

== Filmography ==
- Drimage (1982)
- Paesaggio con figure (1983)
- Giulia in ottobre (1985)
- Voci celate (1986)
- La fabbrica sospesa (1987)
- Antonio e Cleo, episode of Provvisorio quasi d'amore (1988)
- The Peaceful Air of the West (1990)
- Musiche bruciano (1991)
- Femmine, folle e polvere d'archivio (1992)
- A Soul Split in Two (1993)
- Miracoli, storie per corti (1994)
- Frammenti di una storia tra cinema e periferia (1995)
- Made in Lombardia (1996)
- Dimenticare Biasca (1997)
- The Acrobats (1997)
- Il futuro alle spalle - voci da un'età inquieta (1998)
- Rom Tour (1999)
- Bread and Tulips (1999)
- Burning in the Wind (2002)
- Agata and the Storm (2004)
- Days and Clouds (2007)
- Come Undone (2010)
- Garibaldi's Lovers (2012)
- Il colore nascosto delle cose (2017)
- The Tasters (2025)
