= Saverio Costanzo =

Italian film director (born 1975)

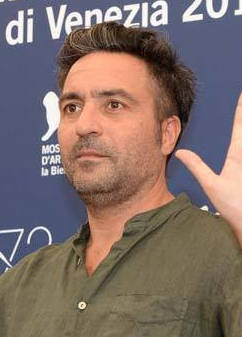
- Costanzo in 2015
- Born: 28 September 1975 (age 50); Rome, Italy
- Occupation: Film director

Saverio Costanzo (born 28 September 1975) is an Italian film and television director.

== Biography ==
=== Early life ===
Costanzo was born in Rome, the son of journalist and TV presenter Maurizio Costanzo and writer Flaminia Morandi, and the brother of writer/director Camilla Costanzo.

=== Career ===
His debut film, Private (2004), had its world premiere at the 57th Locarno International Film Festival, where it won the Golden Leopard, the festival's top prize.

His second feature, In memoria di me (2007), was nominated for a Golden Bear at the 57th Berlin International Film Festival. In 2010, his third film, The Solitude of Prime Numbers, was nominated for a Golden Lion at the 67th Venice International Film Festival.

In 2013 and 2014, Costanzo directed several episodes of In Treatment, the Italian version of the American TV series of the same name. His film Hungry Hearts (2014) was again nominated for a Golden Lion, at the 71st Venice International Film Festival.

Between 2018 and 2024, Costanzo created, directed, and co-wrote My Brilliant Friend, an adaptation of Elena Ferrante's Neapolitan Novels. The series was a co-produced by Rai 1 and HBO.

His fifth film, Finally Dawn (2023), was nominated for a Golden Lion at the 80th Venice International Film Festival.

== Personal life ==
Costanzo has been in a relationship with actress Alba Rohrwacher since 2018.

== Filmography ==
=== Film ===
- Private (2004)
- In memoria di me (2007)
- The Solitude of Prime Numbers (2010)
- Hungry Hearts (2014)
- Finally Dawn (2023)

=== Television ===
- In Treatment (2013–2014)
- My Brilliant Friend (2018–2024)
