= Daughter of Mine =

2018 film

- Film poster
- Directed by: Laura Bispuri
- Written by: Laura Bispuri
- Starring: Valeria Golino; Alba Rohrwacher
- Release date: 18 February 2018 (Berlin)
- Running time: 97 minutes
- Country: Italy
- Language: Italian

Daughter of Mine (Italian: Figlia mia) is an Italian drama film directed by Laura Bispuri. It premiered in the main competition at the 68th Berlin International Film Festival.

== Plot ==
Vittoria, a 10-year-old girl on Sardinia, is very attached to her mother, Tina, who one days takes her to Angelica. This strange woman lives outside the village, with animals and spends time getting drunk with men that only think about sex. The girl grows fond of Angelica and will discover the secret that links the two of them.

== Cast ==
- Valeria Golino as Tina
- Alba Rohrwacher as Angelica
- Udo Kier as Bruno
