= Alba Rohrwacher =

Italian actress (born 1979)

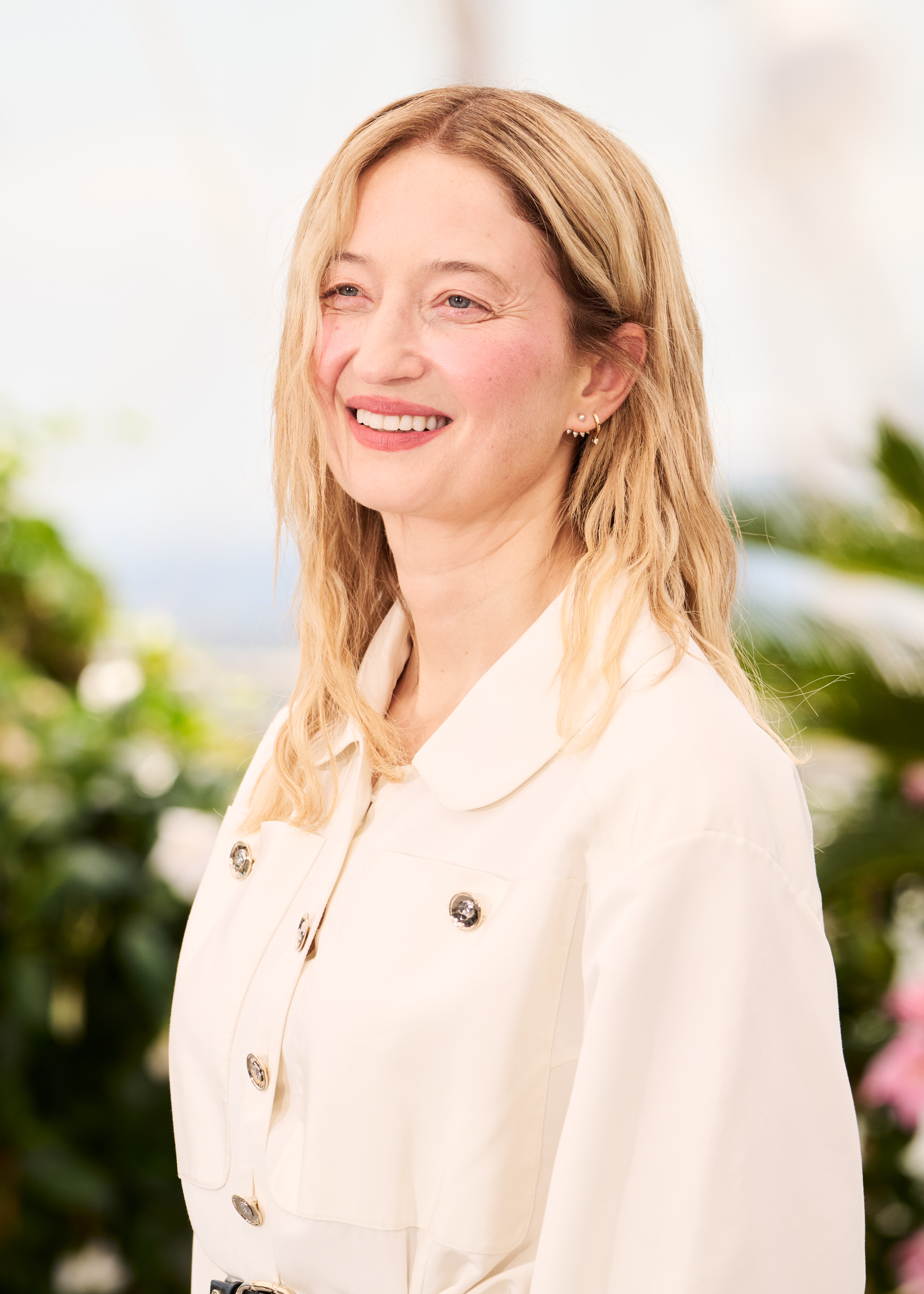
- Rohrwacher in 2025
- Born: Alba Caterina Rohrwacher; 27 February 1979 (age 47); Florence, Tuscany, Italy
- Education: Centro Sperimentale di Cinematografia
- Occupation: Actress
- Years active: 2004–present
- Relatives: Alice Rohrwacher (sister)
- Awards: David di Donatello; Best Actress; 2009 Giovanna's Father; Best Supporting Actress; 2008 Days and Clouds Nastro d'Argento; Best Actress; 2011 The Solitude of Prime Numbers

Alba Caterina Rohrwacher (Italian: [ˈalba rorˈvaːker], German: [ˈʁoːɐ̯vaxɐ]; born 27 February 1979) is an Italian actress.

== Early life ==
Alba Rohrwacher was born in Florence to a German father and an Italian mother.

From the age of 17 to 21 she studied medicine, intending to be a doctor. At the age of 21 she moved to Rome to study acting at the Centro Sperimentale di Cinematografia.

Her younger sister is director Alice Rohrwacher.

== Career ==
Her first movie role was in 2004 in An Italian Romance. In 2008, she was awarded the David di Donatello for Best Supporting Actress. In 2009, she received a David di Donatello for Best Actress for her performance in Pupi Avati's Giovanna's Father. At the Berlin International Film Festival 2009 she was awarded the Shooting Stars Award.

Rohrwacher worked with her sister, director Alice Rohrwacher in the 2014 film The Wonders a semi-autobiographical film in which Alba played a role loosely based on the sisters' mother.

On 6 September 2014, Rohrwacher won the Volpi Cup for Best Actress at the 71st Venice International Film Festival in Hungry Hearts, a film by Italian director Saverio Costanzo.

Rohrwacher worked with her sister a second time on the film Happy as Lazzaro which premiered at the 2018 Cannes Film Festival.

Rohrwacher provided the narration as Older Elena for the series My Brilliant Friend, an adaptation of Elena Ferrante's Neapolitan Novels. In season 4 of the series, Rohrwacher took over the role of Elena. She also appeared in Marc Cousins' 2022 documentary March on Rome. She played Alida Valli in the film Finally Dawn in 2023.

== Other activities ==
Rohrwacher served on the juries of the 68th Venice International Film Festival, chaired by Darren Aronofsky (2011); the 66th Berlin International Film Festival, chaired by Meryl Streep (2016); the 8th Fashion Film Festival Milano, chaired by Pierpaolo Piccioli (2022); and the 78th Cannes Film Festival, chaired by Juliette Binoche (2025).

In 2020, Rohrwacher joined an advertising campaign for Italian jewelry brand Pomellato.

== Personal life ==
As of August 2018 Rohrwacher was in a relationship with Italian director Saverio Costanzo.

== Filmography ==
Key
†	Denotes films that have not yet been released

=== Film ===
Year	Title	Role(s)	Notes
2002	My Mother's Smile	A Nun	
2004	An Italian Romance	Fausta	
2005	Kiss Me Lorena	Elizabeth	
2005	Melissa P.	Clelia	
2006	The Wedding Director	Assistant	Cameo appearance
2006	4-4-2	Laura	Segment: "Mister's Woman"
2007	My Brother Is an Only Child	Violetta Benassi	
2007	Piano, solo	Marta	
2007	Days and Clouds	Alice	
2007	In Your Hands	Carla	
2008	Good Morning Heartache	Lucia	
2008	Quiet Chaos	Annalisa	
2008	Non c'è più niente da fare	Letizia	
2008	Giovanna's Father	Giovanna Casali	
2009	The Ladies Get Their Say	Giulia	
2009	I Am Love	Elisabetta Recchi	
2009	The Man Who Will Come	Beniamina	
2010	Diarchia	Jeune fille	Short film
2010	Come Undone	Anna	
2010	The Solitude of Prime Numbers	Alice Della Rocca	
2010	Sorelle mai	The Teacher	
2011	Tormenti: Film disegnato	Eleonora Ciancarelli	Voice role
2012	Dormant Beauty	Maria Beffardi	
2012	Garibaldi's Lovers	Diana	
2012	Glück	Irina	
2013	A Street in Palermo	Clara	
2013	Con il fiato sospeso	Stella	
2014	The Wonders	Angelica	
2014	Hungry Hearts	Mina	
2015	Sworn Virgin	Hana / Mark	
2015	Tale of Tales	Circus Artist Mother	
2015	Blood of My Blood	Maria Perletti	
2015	Taj Mahal	Giovanna	
2015	Viva la sposa	Sofia	
2016	Perfect Strangers	Bianca	
2016	Il sogno di Francesco	Clare of Assisi	
2016	La Mécanique de l'ombre	Sara	
2017	Ismael's Ghosts	Arielle / Faunia	
2017	The Place	Sister Chiara	
2018	Anthropocene: The Human Epoch	Narrator	Documentary
2018	Daughter of Mine	Angelica	
2018	Happy as Lazzaro	Antonia	
2018	Lucia's Grace	Lucia Ravi	
2019	The Staggering Girl	Vera	Short film
2019	Hellhole	Alba	
2019	If Only	Benedetta	
2020	Sous le ciel d'Alice	Alice Kamar	
2020	Last Words	Dima	
2020	The Ties	Vanda	
2021	Three Floors	Monica	
2021	Il paradiso del pavone	Adelina	
2021	The Lost Daughter	Female Hiker	Cameo appearance
2022	Marcel!	The Mother	
2022	Le pupille	Sister Fioralba	Short film
2023	La chimera	Spartaco	
2023	Out of Season	Alice	
2023	Mi fanno male i capelli	Monica	
2023	Finally Dawn	Alida Valli	
2023	A Brighter Tomorrow	Herself	Cameo appearance
2023	I Told You So	Caterina	
2024	Maria	Bruna Lupoli	
2025	Three Goodbyes	Marta	
2025	Jay Kelly	Alba	
2026	A Common Story	Erika	
2026	A Good Little Soldier	Carla	
TBA	Une autre histoire †	Simona	Post-production
TBA	Un bon petit soldat †	Carla	Post-production
TBA	The Three Incestuous Sisters †	TBA	Filming

=== Television ===
Year	Title	Role(s)	Notes
2004	Don Matteo	Doctor	Episode: "Dietro il sipario"
2007	Maria Montessori – Una vita per i bambini	Anna	Television movie
2015–2016	In Treatment	Lavinia	Recurring role (season 2)
2018	Il miracolo	Sandra Roversi	Main role
2018–2024	My Brilliant Friend	Elena Greco / Narrator	Main role

== Awards and nominations ==
Award	Year	Category	Nominated work	Result
Annecy Italian Film Festival	2008	Best Actress	Good Morning Heartache	Won
Bari International Film Festival	2018	Mariangela MelatonAward for Best Actress	Daughter of Mine	Won
Ciak d'oro	2008	Revelation of the Year	Days and Clouds	Won
Ciak d'oro	2008	Best Supporting Actress	Days and Clouds	Nominated
Ciak d'oro	2010	Best Actress	Come Undone	Won
Ciak d'oro	2011	Best Actress	The Solitude of Prime Numbers	Won
Ciak d'oro	2015	Best Supporting Actress	The Wonders	Nominated
Cinematografo Award	2023	Best Performance	Mi fanno male i capelli	Won
David di Donatello	2008	Best Supporting Actress	Days and Clouds	Won
David di Donatello	2009	Best Actress	Giovanna's Father	Won
David di Donatello	2010	Best Supporting Actress	The Man Who Will Come	Nominated
David di Donatello	2011	Best Actress	The Solitude of Prime Numbers	Nominated
David di Donatello	2015	Best Actress	Hungry Hearts	Nominated
David di Donatello	2019	Best Actress	Lucia's Grace	Nominated
David di Donatello	2021	Best Actress	The Ties	Nominated
David di Donatello	2021	Best Supporting Actress	If Only	Nominated
David di Donatello	2024	Best Supporting Actress	La chimera	Nominated
FRED Film Radio	2021	FRED Award	Herself	Won
Globo d'oro	2009	Best Actress	Giovanna's Father	Nominated
Globo d'oro	2009	Best Breakthrough Actress	Giovanna's Father	Won
Globo d'oro	2010	Best Actress	Come Undone	Nominated
Globo d'oro	2011	Best Actress	The Solitude of Prime Numbers	Nominated
Globo d'oro	2015	Best Actress	Hungry Hearts	Won
Globo d'oro	2018	Best Actress	Daughter of Mine	Nominated
La pellicola d'oro	2021	Best Actress	The Ties	Won
Nastro d'Argento	2008	Best Actress	Good Morning Heartache	Nominated
Nastro d'Argento	2009	Best Actress	Giovanna's Father	Nominated
Nastro d'Argento	2009	Best Supporting Actress	The Ladies Get Their Say	Nominated
Nastro d'Argento	2010	Best Actress	Come Undone	Nominated
Nastro d'Argento	2011	Best Actress	The Solitude of Prime Numbers	Won
Nastro d'Argento	2015	Best Actress	Sworn Virgin	Nominated
Nastro d'Argento	2016	Special Award	Perfect Strangers	Won
Nastro d'Argento	2018	Best Actress	Daughter of Mine	Nominated
Nastro d'Argento	2020	Best Supporting Actress	If Only	Nominated
Nastro d'Argento – Grandi Serie	2025	TV Protagonist of the Year	My Brilliant Friend	Won
Rome Film Festival	2009	"10eLotto" Award	Herself	Won
Sulmona Cinema Film Festival	2009	Best Actress	Good Morning Heartache	Won
Venice Film Festival	2010	Pasinetti Award	The Solitude of Prime Numbers	Won
Venice Film Festival	2013	Pasinetti Award	A Street in Palermo	Won
Venice Film Festival	2014	Volpi Cup for Best Actress	Hungry Hearts	Won
Venice Film Festival	2014	Pasinetti Award	Hungry Hearts	Won
