= Mazzantini =

Mazzantini is an Italian surname. Notable people with the surname include:

- Andrea Mazzantini (born 1968), Italian footballer
- Carlo Mazzantini (1925–2006), Italian writer
- Elena Mazzantini (born 1874), Italian actress known as Daisy Sylvan
- Giselda Volodi (born Giselda Mazzantini, 1959), Italian actress
- Leonardo Mazzantini (born 1953), Italian racing cyclist
- Margaret Mazzantini (born 1961), Italian writer and actress
- Matteo Mazzantini (born 1976), Italian rugby union player
