= Castellitto =

Castellitto is an Italian surname. Notable people with the surname include:

- Pietro Castellitto (born 1991), Italian actor, film director, and screenwriter, son of Sergio
- Sergio Castellitto (born 1953), Italian actor, film director, and screenwriter
