= The Apartment (production company) =

Italian film and television production company

The Apartment S.r.l.
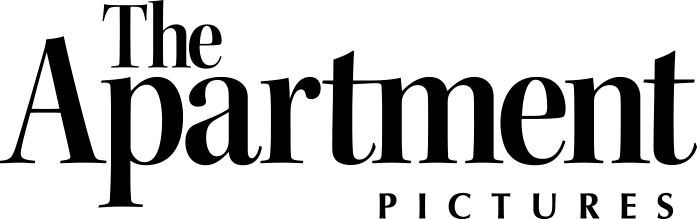
- Type: Società a responsabilità limitata (S.r.l.)
- Industry: Entertainment
- Founded: December 2019; 6 years ago
- Founder: Lorenzo Mieli
- Headquarters: Rome, Italy
- Key people: Annamaria Morelli (CEO)
- Products: Feature films; Television series
- Parent: Fremantle
- Website: theapartment.it

The Apartment S.r.l., doing business as The Apartment Pictures, is an Italian film and television production company within the Fremantle group. It was founded by Lorenzo Mieli in 2019.

== History ==
In December 2019, it was announced that Lorenzo Mieli had founded a Fremantle-owned production company, The Apartment. He had previously worked under Fremantle's Wildside banner. In March 2023, Gabriele Immirzi became the company's co-CEO alongside Mieli. Mieli left the company in January 2024, and Annamaria Morelli became the new CEO the following month.

== Filmography ==
=== Film ===
Year	Title	Director	Ref.
2020	Figli	Giuseppe Bonito	
2020	My Name Is Francesco Totti	Alex Infascelli	
2021	The Hand of God	Paolo Sorrentino	
2021	America Latina	Damiano and Fabio D'Innocenzo	
2022	Exterior Night	Marco Bellocchio	
2022	Bones and All	Luca Guadagnino	
2022	Bejbis	Andrzej Saramonowicz	
2022	Kill Me If You Can	Alex Infascelli	
2023	Adagio	Stefano Sollima	
2023	Priscilla	Sofia Coppola	
2023	Enea	Pietro Castellitto	
2023	Holiday	Edoardo Gabbriellini	
2023	I Told You So	Ginevra Elkann	
2023	Roma, santa e dannata	Daniele Ciprì	
2023	Life's a Beach	Gennaro Nunziante	
2024	Parthenope	Paolo Sorrentino	
2024	Maria	Pablo Larraín	
2024	Queer	Luca Guadagnino	
2024	Without Blood	Angelina Jolie	
2025	Fuori	Mario Martone	
2025	La grazia	Paolo Sorrentino	
2025	Father Mother Sister Brother	Jim Jarmusch	
2025	The Kidnapping of Arabella	Carolina Cavalli	
2026	Rosebush Pruning	Karim Aïnouz	
2026	Ketticè	Giovanni Tortorici	

=== Television ===
Year	Title	Network	Notes	Ref.
2020	The New Pope	Sky Atlantic, HBO, Canal+		
2020–2024	My Brilliant Friend	Rai 1	Seasons 2–4	
2020	We Are Who We Are	HBO		
2020	Homemade	Netflix		
2022–present	The King	Sky Atlantic		
2022–present	Bang Bang Baby	Amazon Prime Video		
2022	Boris	Star	Season 4	
2024	Supersex	Netflix		
2024–present	Mussolini: Son of the Century	Sky Atlantic		
2025	The Monster of Florence	Netflix		
2026	Portobello	HBO Max		
TBA	Ferrari	Apple TV+		
