= The Kidnapping of Arabella =

Italian drama film

- Theatrical release poster
- Italian: Il rapimento di Arabella
- Directed by: Carolina Cavalli
- Screenplay by: Carolina Cavalli
- Produced by: Antonio Celsi; Annamaria Morelli
- Starring: Benedetta Porcaroli; Lucrezia Guglielmino; Chris Pine
- Cinematography: Lorenzo Levrini
- Edited by: Babak Jalali
- Music by: Thomas Moked Blum; Noaz Deshe
- Production companies: The Apartment Pictures; Elsinore Film; PiperFilm
- Distributed by: PiperFilm
- Release date: 28 August 2025 (Venice)
- Running time: 107 minutes
- Country: Italy
- Language: Italian
- Box office: $156,593

The Kidnapping of Arabella (Italian: Il rapimento di Arabella) is a 2025 Italian drama film written and directed by Carolina Cavalli, and starring Benedetta Porcaroli, Lucrezia Guglielmino and Chris Pine.

The film had its world premiere in the Orizzonti section of the 82nd Venice International Film Festival on 28 August 2025, where Porcaroli won the Best Actress prize.

== Premise ==
Following a chance encounter with a child, a woman gains an insight into herself.

== Cast ==
- Benedetta Porcaroli as Holly
- Lucrezia Guglielmino as Arabella
- Chris Pine as Orest D.
- Roberto Zibetti as the police officer
- Roberta Da Soller
- Marco Bonadei as Maccarino
- Eva Robin's as Granatina
- Livio Pacella as the driver
- Milutin Dapcevic as Robin

== Production ==
The film is written and directed by Italian director Carolina Cavalli, in her second feature film. It is produced by Elsinore Film and The Apartment, a Fremantle company. The producers are Antonio Celsi for Elsinore and Annamaria Morelli for The Apartment.

The cast is led by Benedetta Porcaroli and includes Lucrezia Guglielmino in a titular role, and Chris Pine in an Italian-speaking part, his first non English-language role.

Principal photography took place in August 2024 between Veneto and Emilia-Romagna in northern Italy.

== Reception ==
The film received generally favorable reviews from critics, who praised its direction, screenplay, and the performances of Porcaroli and Guglielmino.

Emanuele Bucci of Ciak drew comparisons to the director's previous work, Amanda (2022), highlighting similar themes such as "critiques of the upper-class microcosm" and the portrayal of "clashing female characters."

Damiano Panattoni of Movieplayer.it described the film as "a dysfunctional coming-of-age story that emphasizes the importance of writing in its visual execution," referring to the director as "a highly interesting filmmaker."

Giorgio Amadori of Sentieri Selvaggi characterized the film as an "absurdist comedy" that distinguishes itself from Italian cinema, drawing parallels to the works of Joel and Ethan Coen and Wim Wenders. While he acknowledged some "heavy-handedness" in the screenplay, he appreciated the film's divisive, imperfect nature, noting that it could even be "off beat" in certain aspects.

In addition, Dazed ranked the film 11th on its list of the best films of 2025.

On review aggregator website Rotten Tomatoes, the film holds an approval rating of 65% based on 20 reviews, with an average rating of 5.3/10.
