= A Bookshop in Paris =

2021 romance film

- Directed by: Sergio Castellitto
- Screenplay by: Margaret Mazzantini; Sergio Castellitto
- Story by: Ettore Scola; Silvia Scola; Furio Scarpelli
- Produced by: Andrea Petrozzi
- Starring: Sergio Castellitto; Bérénice Bejo; Matilda De Angelis
- Cinematography: Italo Petriccione
- Edited by: Chiara Vullo
- Music by: Arturo Annecchino
- Release date: 2021
- Language: Italian

A Bookshop in Paris (Italian: Il materiale emotivo, lit. 'The emotional substance', French: Un dragon en forme de nuage, lit. 'A cloud-shaped dragon') is a 2021 romance film co-written and directed by Sergio Castellitto. A co-production between Italy, France and United States, it stars Sergio Castellitto, Bérénice Bejo and Matilda De Angelis.

== Cast ==
- Sergio Castellitto as Vincenzo
- Bérénice Bejo as Yolande
- Matilda De Angelis as Albertine
- Clementino as Clemente
- Sandra Milo as Madame Milo
- Alex Lutz as Gérard
- Marie-Philomène Nga as Colombe
- Nassim Lyes as Alain
- Maxence Dinant as Father Mathieu
- Bruno Gouery as the kleptomaniac

== Production ==
The film comes from the script of an unrealized project by Ettore Scola. Prior to this adaptation, the script was first adapted by Ivo Milazzo in a graphic novel entitled Un drago a forma di nuvola. The film was shot in Cinecittà.

== Release ==
The film opened the 2021 Bari International Film Festival and was released on Italian cinemas on 7 October 2021.

== Reception ==
The film won the Silver Ribbon for best production design, and got a nomination for best original story.
