= Pietro Castellitto =

Italian actor, film director, and screenwriter

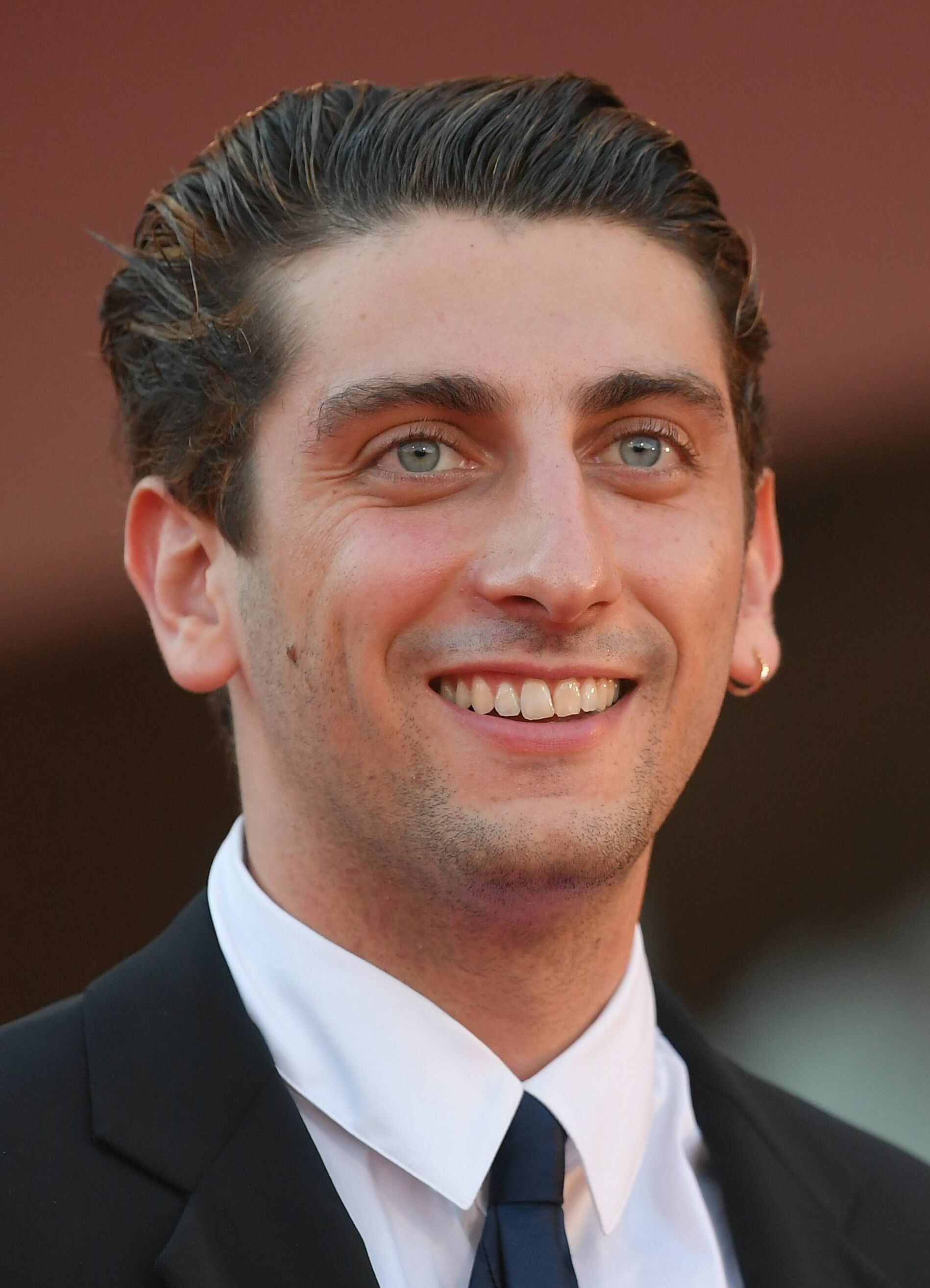
- Pietro Castellitto in 2020
- Born: Pietro Contento Castellitto; 16 December 1991 (age 34); Rome, Italy
- Citizenship: Italy; Ireland; (resident)
- Education: Sapienza University of Rome
- Occupations: Actor; filmmaker
- Years active: 2004–present
- Parents: Sergio Castellitto (father); Margaret Mazzantini (mother)
- Relatives: Carlo Mazzantini (grandfather); Anne Donnelly (grandmother); Giselda Volodi (aunt)

Pietro Contento Castellitto (born 16 December 1991) is an Italian actor, film director, and screenwriter, son of actor and director Sergio Castellitto and Italian-Irish writer Margaret Mazzantini.

== Biography ==
Castellitto began his acting career in the early 2000s, in films directed by his father, such as Don't Move.

In 2020, Castellitto presented his directorial debut, The Predators, at the Horizons section of the 77th Venice Film Festival, where he received the Best Screenplay Award.

== Partial filmography ==
=== Actor ===
| Year | Title | Director | Role |
|---|---|---|---|
| 2004 | Don't Move | Sergio Castellitto | Young Timoteo |
| 2012 | È nata una star? | Lucio Pellegrini | Marco |
| 2012 | Twice Born | Sergio Castellitto | Pietro |
| 2018 | La profezia dell'armadillo | Emanuele Scaringi | Secco |
| 2020 | The Predators | Pietro Castellitto | Federico |
| 2020 | Freaks Out | Gabriele Mainetti | Cencio |
| 2022 | Robbing Mussolini | Renato De Maria | Pietro Lamberti / Isola |
| 2023 | Enea | Pietro Castellitto | Enea |
| 2024 | Diva Futura | Giulia Steigerwalt | Riccardo Schicchi |
| 2025 | The Big Fake | Stefano Lodovichi | Toni |

=== Director ===
| Year | Title | Notes |
|---|---|---|
| 2020 | The Predators | World Premiere at the Horizons section of the 77th Venice International Film Festival |
| 2023 | Enea | World Premiere at the main competition of the 80th Venice International Film Festival |
