= Carolina Cavalli =

Italian film director and writer

- Cavalli in 2025
- Born: Milan, Italy
- Occupations: Film director, writer
- Known for: Amanda, The Kidnapping of Arabella

Carolina Cavalli is an Italian filmmaker, most known for her feature films Amanda (2022) and The Kidnapping of Arabella (2025).

== Life and career ==
Carolina Cavalli was born in Milan.

In 2017, she was the recipient of the San Francisco Film Society Kenneth Rainin Foundation Filmmaking Grants. In 2018, Cavalli won the Italian screenwriting award Premio Solinas for TV writing.

In 2020, she directed the pilot of the miniseries Mi hanno sputato nel milkshake. In 2021, she worked on the Netflix show Zero as a staff writer.

Her debut feature Amanda premiered in September 2022 at the 79th Venice International Film Festival and internationally at the 47th Toronto International Film Festival. Cavalli was nominated for Best Directorial Debut at the David di Donatello and the Nastri d'Argento.

In November 2022, her first novel, Metropolitania, was published by Fandango Libri.

Cavalli co-wrote the film Fremont along with the Iranian film director and producer, Babak Jalali. Fremont premiered in January 2023 at the Sundance Film Festival, and screened later in March at the SXSW Film Festival. It has been selected in Karlovy Vary International Film Festival Competition for its International premiere. As a writer of Fremont, Cavalli was nominated for Best International Feature Film at the British Independent Film Awards in 2024. In the same year she won the John Cassavetes Awards at the Independent Spirit Awards.

In August 2024, principal photography began on her second feature film The Kidnapping of Arabella, starring Benedetta Porcaroli and American actor Chris Pine. The film competed in the Orizzonti section of the 82nd Venice International Film Festival in August 2025. In 2025, the film premiered internationally at the BFI London Film Festival.

In 2026, Cavalli served on the jury of the Biarritz Film Festival – Nouvelles Vagues, presided over by Kristen Stewart.

In 2026 Cavalli served as President of the Jury of the First Feature Film competition at the 83rd Venice International Film Festival

== Filmography ==
Film
Year	Title	Notes
2022	Amanda	Also writer
2023	Fremont	Co-writer
2025	The Kidnapping of Arabella	Also writer

Television series
Year	Title	Network	Notes
2020	Mi hanno sputato nel milkshake	RaiPlay	Pilot episode

== Books ==
- Cavalli, Carolina (2022). Metropolitania. Rome: Fandango Libri.ISBN 8860448751, 978-8860448750
