= Immaculate (2024 film) =

American psychological horror film by Michael Mohan

- Theatrical release poster
- Directed by: Michael Mohan
- Written by: Andrew Lobel
- Produced by: David Bernad; Sydney Sweeney; Jonathan Davino; Teddy Schwarzman; Michael Heimler
- Starring: Sydney Sweeney; Álvaro Morte; Benedetta Porcaroli; Dora Romano; Giorgio Colangeli; Simona Tabasco
- Cinematography: Elisha Christian
- Edited by: Christian Masini
- Music by: Will Bates
- Production companies: Black Bear Pictures; Fifty-Fifty Films; Middle Child Pictures
- Distributed by: Neon
- Release dates: March 12, 2024 (SXSW); March 22, 2024 (United States)
- Running time: 89 minutes
- Country: United States
- Language: English; Italian
- Budget: $9 million
- Box office: $35 million

Immaculate is a 2024 American horror film directed by Michael Mohan and written by Andrew Lobel. It stars Sydney Sweeney (who also produced), Álvaro Morte, Benedetta Porcaroli, Dora Romano, Giorgio Colangeli, and Simona Tabasco. The plot focuses on a young novice nun, who is invited to reside at a picturesque Italian convent, but slowly realizes the terrifying secrets it harbors.

Immaculate premiered at South by Southwest on March 12, 2024, and was released theatrically in the United States by Neon on March 22, 2024. The film received mostly positive reviews and grossed $35 million worldwide.

== Plot ==
Sister Mary sneaks into a superior's bedroom at night and steals keys to escape through the locked gates of a Catholic convent. Four hooded figures capture her and break her leg, then knock her unconscious. Mary later wakes up in a coffin and is buried alive.

After surviving a drowning in a frozen lake and being declared dead for seven minutes, young novice Sister Cecilia, who turned to Christianity at an early age, becomes convinced God saved her for a purpose. She receives an invitation from Father Sal Tedeschi to join a convent in Italy that tends to dying nuns. Cecilia becomes a nun.

Cecilia befriends Sister Gwen and is struck by certain oddities, such as an elder nun having cross-shaped scars on the soles of her feet. The convent's chapel houses a relic, a Holy Nail that was used to crucify Jesus. After having nightmares of hooded figures, Cecilia is shocked to learn that she is pregnant, even though she is a virgin. The convent's inhabitants begin to treat her as the next Virgin Mary, with many proclaiming the child is a "blessing".

Another nun, Sister Isabelle, tries to drown Cecilia out of jealousy and later dies by falling from the roof of the convent. Cecilia throws up one of her own teeth and her health worsens. Her request to be taken to a proper hospital is denied by Father Tedeschi. Gwen publicly chastises the convent superiors for this abnormality but is then taken away by Father Tedeschi and Deacon Enzo. At night, Cecilia sneaks around the convent and finds her personal file, and is shocked to find information about her childhood accident and a karyotype. Hearing a woman screaming, she investigates and is horrified to witness a hooded figure cutting out Gwen's tongue. An elder nun appears and silences Cecilia. She begs to escape, but the elder chastises her, saying that she will never leave the convent.

Cecilia fakes a miscarriage to be taken to the hospital, but the deception is exposed and she is tied up. Tedeschi explains that he was a geneticist before becoming a priest and used DNA samples taken from the Holy Nail to impregnate nuns in the hopes of ushering in a new messiah. Before Cecilia, Tedeschi's numerous attempts failed, often resulting in malformed fetuses. Tedeschi brands a cross into Cecilia's feet, as seen in other nuns.

Cecilia makes another attempt to escape. She beats Mother Superior to death using a crucifix, and shortly afterward, her water breaks. She manages to strangle the cardinal with her rosary before dousing Tedeschi's lab in ethanol. Tedeschi arrives and tries to stop her, but Cecilia narrowly escapes by igniting the ethanol with a lighter.

Tedeschi breaks out of the laboratory after extinguishing the flames and continues his pursuit of Cecilia, forcing her to flee into the catacombs under the convent. Cecilia finds Gwen's mutilated corpse along with a hole in the catacomb's walls. Tedeschi finds her just as she is about to escape and a struggle ensues. Tedeschi tries to cut Cecilia's stomach open, but she stabs him in the throat with the Holy Nail relic, which she has stolen from the chapel. After exiting the catacombs, Cecilia agonizingly gives birth and bites through the umbilical cord herself. She is horrified by the sight of the baby, which is heard making strange, animalistic noises. Cecilia stumbles away to grab and lift a nearby rock, which she uses to crush it to death. (Note: Given that the neonate does not sound like a baby, but rather gurgles and growls, it has been interpreted as being the Antichrist.)

== Cast ==
- Sydney Sweeney as Sister Cecilia
- Álvaro Morte as Father Sal Tedeschi
- Dora Romano as Mother Superior
- Benedetta Porcaroli as Sister Gwen
- Giorgio Colangeli as Cardinal Franco Merola
- Simona Tabasco as Sister Mary
- Giulia Heathfield Di Renzi as Sister Isabelle
- Giampiero Judica as Doctor Gallo
- Giuseppe Lo Piccolo as Deacon Enzo

== Production ==
Development on Immaculate was underway as early as 2014, when Sydney Sweeney first auditioned for a role in the film from a screenplay written by Andrew Lobel. However, the project fell into development hell instead of entering production. Following her breakout role in the television series Euphoria, Sweeney purchased the rights to the screenplay and approached frequent collaborator Michael Mohan to direct. Mohan has stated that many of the film's scenes were inspired by his Catholic upbringing.

In October 2022, it was announced that Sweeney had joined the cast of the film, with Mohan directing, and with Sweeney serving as a producer under her Fifty-Fifty Films banner. Mohan stated that the script originally featured a cast of high school girls, not nuns, and was changed to better suit Sweeney and audience expectations.

In February 2023, Álvaro Morte, Benedetta Porcaroli, Dora Romano, Giorgio Colangeli and Simona Tabasco joined the cast of the film.

Principal photography took place in and around Rome, and concluded by February 2023. Much of the film was shot at Villa Parisi and the Doria Pamphilj Gallery. Villa Parisi had previously been used as a location for several horror films, including Hatchet for the Honeymoon (1970), A Bay of Blood (1971), Blood for Dracula (1974) and Burial Ground (1981). The catacombs sequences were shot in the real catacombs of Rome.

== Release ==
In December 2023, Neon acquired US distribution rights to the film. It had its world premiere at South by Southwest on March 12, 2024. It was released on March 22, 2024. The film also screened at the Fargo Film Festival on March 22, 2024.

== Reception ==
=== Box office ===
Immaculate grossed $15.7 million in the United States and Canada, and $19.7 million in other territories, for a worldwide total of $35 million.

In the United States and Canada, Immaculate was released alongside Ghostbusters: Frozen Empire and Late Night with the Devil, and was projected to gross around $5 million from 2,354 theaters in its opening weekend. The film made $2 million on its first day, and went on to debut to $5.3 million, finishing fourth and marking the best opening weekend in Neon's history. It dropped 36% in its second weekend to $3.3 million, finishing in fifth.

=== Critical response ===
On the review aggregator website Rotten Tomatoes, 72% of 211 critics' reviews are positive, with an average rating of 6.3/10. The website's consensus reads: "Immaculate in conception if not always in execution, this religiously themed horror outing is saved by a divine performance from Sydney Sweeney." Metacritic, which uses a weighted average, assigned the film a score of 57 out of 100, based on 39 critics, indicating "mixed or average" reviews. Audiences polled by CinemaScore gave the film an average grade of "C" on an A+ to F scale, while those polled by PostTrak gave the film a 52% overall positive score, with 30% saying they would definitely recommend it.

Tim Robey of The Telegraph awarded the film three stars out of five, saying that "Sydney Sweeney's pregnant-nun horror takes time to deliver… Only at the very end does Immaculate deliver, so to speak, on some of (its) hinted-at promise." Manohla Dargis of The New York Times called the film a Critic's Pick, writing that the film "is a scare-fest with a plucky heroine, an irreverent hot-button twist and just enough narrative ambiguity to give viewers something to argue about."

=== Comparisons to The First Omen ===
Sharing similar premises (and a common Italian setting) and released at about the same time, Immaculate and The First Omen have been dubbed "twin" films. Some reviewers have suggested both films explore the issue of female bodily autonomy, depicting the "systemic control of women's bodies reduced to vessels". Bilge Ebiri of Vulture wrote "why should anyone be surprised that suddenly, in the wake of the Supreme Court's overturning of Roe v. Wade, as state after state attempts to enact religious laws depriving women of bodily agency, America is getting horror movies about people forced into monstrous births by religious institutions worried about their growing irrelevance".

=== Accolades ===
Award	Date of ceremony	Category	Recipient(s)	Result	Ref.
South by Southwest Film Festival	March 16, 2024	Headliners Audience Award	Immaculate	Nominated	
Golden Trailer Awards	May 30, 2024	Best Horror TV Spot (for a Feature Film)	"Mother"	Nominated	
Golden Trailer Awards	May 30, 2024	Best Horror/Thriller TrailerByte for a Feature Film	"Descend"	Nominated	
Golden Trailer Awards	May 30, 2024	Best Horror Poster	"Key Art"	Nominated	
Astra Midseason Movie Awards	July 3, 2024	Best Horror	Immaculate	Nominated	
Fangoria Chainsaw Awards	October 2024	Best Lead Performance	Sydney Sweeney	Nominated	
Fangoria Chainsaw Awards	October 2024	Best Costume Design	Lisa Crescioli	Nominated	
Actors and Actresses Union Awards	March 10, 2025	Best Actor in an International Production	Álvaro Morte	Nominated	

== Themes ==
The film addresses themes of genetic modification and debates surrounding childbirth, abortion, and infanticide. Speaking with Fangoria, director Mohan recited a story wherein his family stopped attending church after hearing a pro-life sermon; however he held that the movie was not intended to have a social message. The article reads

And though the film – which is, at the end of the day, about a forced birth by a religious institution laying claim to a woman's body – is already getting its share of blowback from certain conservative corners of the internet, Mohan is unbothered. "I don't think of it as a problem. I think it's a necessary conversation, and if a film can inspire that conversation, then we've done our job. But I also want to be really clear: I want that conversation to be started by the audience. I don't want them to look at us and go 'Look at those social justice warriors!'" Mohan seems more invested in having Immaculate carry out horror's other important mission: scarring people for life.

Several critics likened Immaculate to a modern revival of the nunsploitation sub-genre. Others noted the aesthetic and thematic influences of 1970s European horror cinema, including directors Dario Argento, Mario Bava, Lucio Fulci, and Roman Polanski.
