= Libero Burro =

- Theatrical release poster
- Directed by: Sergio Castellitto
- Written by: Sergio Castellitto; Giulia Mibelli; Margaret Mazzantini; Piero Bodrato
- Story by: Bruno Gambarotta
- Produced by: Massimo Ferrero
- Starring: Sergio Castellitto
- Cinematography: Gian Filippo Corticelli
- Music by: Angélique Nachon; Jean-Claude Nachon
- Production companies: Intrepido Film; RAI-Radiotelevisione Italiana
- Distributed by: 20th Century Fox
- Release date: 10 September 1999
- Country: Italy
- Language: Italian

Libero Burro is a 1999 Italian comedy film. The film marked the debut as director and screenwriter of Sergio Castellitto. It premiered, out of competition, at 56th Venice Film Festival. The film won the Grand Prix at the Mons International Film Festival.

== Plot ==
Libero Burro is a man of southern origin, with no property and idle, who has decided to pursue a career as a manager in Turin. He decides to take a gamble and tries to grab La Cavallerizza, a central building owned by his friend Marione, horse player and father of the fascinating Rosa. Libero, who has no qualifications, enrolled in evening schools, attended by non-EU citizens, to obtain a surveyor's diploma. On this occasion he meets Caterina, an Italian teacher, with whom he falls in love. But a businessman, Gaetano Novaro, a graduate, opposes him in every way and life becomes difficult for Libero. Libero is no longer able to manage events, and decides to focus on more affordable objectives. Caterina remains with him. Then, for the future, we'll see.

== Cast ==
- Sergio Castellitto as Libero Burro
- Margaret Mazzantini as Caterina Clavarino
- Michel Piccoli as Uncle Toni
- Chiara Mastroianni as Rosa Agnello
- Robert Hundar as Tito
- Giovanni Visentin as Dr. Raffaele Pomba
- Gian Fabio Bosco as Mario Agnello
- Bruno Armando as Gaetano Novaro

== See also ==
- List of Italian films of 1999
