= Filippa Lagerbäck =

Swedish television presenter and model (born 1973)

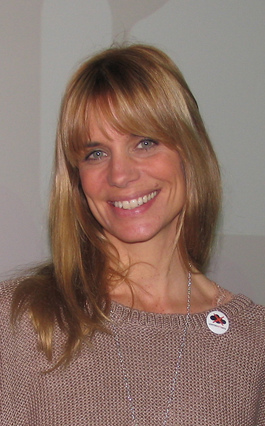
- Filippa Lagerbäck (2011)
- Born: 21 September 1973 (age 53); Stockholm, Sweden
- Occupation: Television presenter

Filippa Lagerbäck (pronounced [fɪˈlɪ̂pːa ˈlɑ̂ːɡɛrˌbɛk]; born 21 September 1973) is a Swedish television presenter and fashion model working and residing in Italy.

== Career ==
Lagerbäck is a television presenter in Italy and has been working in the country since 1998 both for RAI and Italia 1. Starting her career as a model, she moved to Milan where she started working for an Italian television station. In 1996 she starred in the film Silenzio... si nasce, directed by Giovanni Veronesi, and from 1998 to 1999 starred in the television series Fiorello. The following year she hosted the Italian version of Candid Camera on RAI with Marco Balestri, Alessia Merz and Samantha De Grenet and the Italia 1 show Strano ma vero with Gene Gnocchi and Cristina Parodi. Lagerbäck hosted the music show Controvento on Italia 1 in 2001 and Circo Massimo on Rai 3 in 2002.

In 2004, Lagerbäck was approached by Swedish television to host the reality show The Farm on TV4. In 2010, she returned to Swedish television hosting Drömmen om Italien (English: The Dream of Italy), also on the same channel. Since 2005, she has co-hosted the Rai 3 show Che tempo che fa with presenter Fabio Fazio, introducing guests of the show.

In 2012, she began hosting the La7D show That's Italia along with Pino Strabioli.

== Personal life ==
Lagerbäck lives between Milan and Città di Castello with her husband Daniele Bossari and daughter Stella.

== TV ==
- Superboll (Canale 5, 1998–1999)
- Candid Camera (Italia 1, 2000)
- Strano ma vero (Italia 1, 2000)
- Controvento (Italia 1, 2001)
- Circo Massimo (Rai 3, 2002–2010)
- The Farm (Swedish television, 2004)
- Festival internazionale del Circo di Monte Carlo (Rai 3, 2004–2005)
- Che tempo che fa (Rai 3, 2005–2017; Rai 1, 2017–2023; Nove, 2023–present)
- Drömmen om Italien (Swedish television, 2010)
- That's Italia (La7d e La7, 2012)
- Festival di Sanremo (Rai 1, 2013)

== Filmography ==
- Silenzio... si nasce (1996)

== Books ==
- 2013: Io pedalo e tu?, La Feltrinelli Libri e Musica, Milan.
