= Rosebush Pruning =

2026 film by Karim Aïnouz

- Theatrical release poster
- Directed by: Karim Aïnouz
- Screenplay by: Efthimis Filippou
- Based on: Fists in the Pocket by Marco Bellocchio
- Produced by: Michael Weber; Viola Fügen; Simone Gattoni; Annamaria Morelli; Andreas Wentz; Vladimir Zemtsov
- Starring: Callum Turner; Riley Keough; Elle Fanning; Jamie Bell; Lukas Gage; Tracy Letts; Pamela Anderson
- Cinematography: Hélène Louvart
- Edited by: Heike Parplies; Dávid Jancsó; Ilka Janka Nagy
- Music by: Matthew Herbert
- Production companies: The Apartment Pictures; The Match Factory; Sur-Film; In Bloom; Mubi; Fremantle; Kavac Film; Rai Cinema; Metafilms; Anna Films; Crybaby Films; BFI
- Distributed by: Mubi
- Release dates: 14 February 2026 (Berlinale); 23 April 2026 (Germany); 10 July 2026 (United Kingdom)
- Running time: 95 minutes
- Countries: United Kingdom; Italy; Germany; Spain
- Language: English
- Box office: $83,818

Rosebush Pruning is a 2026 satirical tragicomedy thriller film directed by Karim Aïnouz, written by Efthimis Filippou and loosely based on the 1965 film Fists in the Pocket by Marco Bellocchio. It stars Callum Turner, Riley Keough, Elle Fanning, Jamie Bell, Lukas Gage, Tracy Letts and Pamela Anderson.

The film had its world premiere at the main competition of the 76th Berlin International Film Festival on 14 February 2026, where it was nominated for the Golden Bear. It was released theatrically by Mubi in Germany on 23 April, followed by the United Kingdom on 10 July. The film received generally negative reviews from critics.

== Plot ==
A satirical black comedy centring on an affluent but perverse family, Rosebush Pruning opens on a Spanish beach, where Edward is lecturing his new-found friend, George, on the tenets of fashion. From here, Edward introduces the audience to his family, which has recently moved from New York City to Catalonia, where its matriarch, Mother, was ripped apart by wolves; the household now comprises Father and his children Anna, Robert, Jack, and Edward. When Jack brings home a girlfriend, tensions rise in the family, all of whom are incestuously involved with Jack.

== Cast ==
- Callum Turner as Ed
- Riley Keough as Anna
- Elle Fanning as Martha, Jack's girlfriend
- Jamie Bell as Jack, the eldest son
- Tracy Letts as the Father
- Pamela Anderson as the Mother
- Elena Anaya as Emma
- Lukas Gage as Robert
- Yorgos Stefanakos as George

== Production ==
=== Development ===
The film is produced by The Apartment Pictures in partnership with Match Factory Productions, Mubi, Kavac Film and Rai Cinema, and is directed by Karim Aïnouz. It is written by Efthimis Filippou and inspired by Marco Bellocchio's debut feature Fists in the Pocket.

Viola Fügen and Michael Weber produced for The Match Factory, also handling worldwide sales. Simone Gattoni produced for Kavac Film, alongside Annamaria Morelli for The Apartment and Vladimir Zemtsov for Gold Rush Pictures. Spanish co-producers included Andreas Wentz and Juan Cano “Nono” for SUR FILM, while Rachel Dargavel served as co-producer for the UK's Crybaby. The executive producers were Lota Dascioraite, Mitch Oliver, Catherine Boily, Kateryna Merkt, Matthew E Chausse, Pietro Caracciolo, Lorenza Veronica, Alessandro Del Vigna, Guilherme Cezar Coelho, Fernando Loureiro, Gabriel Amaral, and Morwin Schmookler.

Rosebush Pruning is Aïnouz's second English language feature film following Firebrand (2023).

=== Casting ===
Kristen Stewart, Josh O'Connor and Elle Fanning joined the cast of Rosebushpruning in May 2023. In September 2024, it was announced Riley Keough and Callum Turner had replaced Stewart and O'Connor due to scheduling conflicts. Also joining the cast at this time were Jamie Bell, Lukas Gage, Tracy Letts, Elena Anaya and Pamela Anderson with the title format changing to Rosebush Pruning.

=== Filming ===
Principal photography began in Spain on 26 September 2024 and wrapped 9 November, lasting approximately 35 days. Shooting locations included Castellterçol, Catalonia, and Barcelona.

== Release ==
It had its world premiere at the 76th Berlin International Film Festival on 14 February 2026. It is scheduled to be released in Germany by Mubi on 23 April. Mubi will also handle distribution in Italy, North America, UK & Ireland.

== Reception ==
On the review aggregator website Rotten Tomatoes, 16% of 57 critics' reviews are positive, with an average rating of 3.9/10. The website's consensus reads: "Visually polished but dramatically hollow, Rosebush Pruning pairs strong performances with stylish excess yet never matches its satirical ambitions with genuine wit or insight." Metacritic, which uses a weighted average, assigned the film a score of 46 out of 100, based on 11 critics, indicating "mixed or average" reviews.

Indiewire's David Opie describing it as "wearying and amusing in equal measure", and The Hollywood Reporter's David Rooney summarising it as "shallowness with style in mixed-bag satire".
