= Anne Donnelly =

Irish painter

- Born: 1932 (age 93–94); Belfast, Northern Ireland, United Kingdom
- Education: National College of Art
- Spouse: Carlo Mazzantini (m. 1957; died 2006)
- Children: 4, including Margaret Mazzantini and Giselda Volodi
- Relatives: Pietro Castellitto (grandson)
- Website: www.anne-donnelly.com

Anne Donnelly (born 1932) is an Irish artist living in Italy.

== Life ==
Born in Belfast, Donnelly grew up in County Carlow. She studied in the National College of Art in Dublin graduating in 1953 and then went on to the Escuela de Bellas Artes in Madrid before finishing at the Ecole Julienne in Paris in 1956. While in Paris, Donnelly met her husband Carlo Mazzantini who died in 2006. They had four daughters, including the novelist Margaret Mazzantini and the actress Giselda Volodi.

The whole family spent time travelling in France, Spain, Ireland and Morocco through the late 50s and early 60s. They settled initially in Tuscany and finally in Tivoli.

== Career ==
Donnelly has exhibited since the 50s in public and private collections throughout Ireland, Italy, Great Britain, France, Spain, Greece, Argentina, Switzerland, USA and Australia. She has received praise from critics such as Elena Pontiggia, Seamus Heaney, Guido Giuffrè, and Paul Cahill. Exhibitions include : 2007 Riflessi Diversi: Artist and Irish poets, in Torre di Magione, 2008 Equus, semper. Art Hippodrome in Rome, The Museum of Modern Art (M.O.M.A), New York and regularly in the Peppercanister Gallery in Dublin and the Claremorris Gallery, County Mayo.

She is a member of DUNA (part of the International Association of Women Artists)
