= Silenzio... si nasce =

- Directed by: Giovanni Veronesi
- Written by: Ugo Chiti; Giovanni Veronesi
- Produced by: Aurelio De Laurentiis
- Starring: Sergio Castellitto; Paolo Rossi
- Cinematography: Roberto Forza
- Edited by: Nino Baragli
- Music by: Giancarlo Bigazzi
- Release date: 1996
- Running time: 90 minutes
- Country: Italy
- Language: Italian

Silenzio... si nasce is a 1996 Italian comedy film directed by Giovanni Veronesi.

== Cast ==
- Sergio Castellitto
- Paolo Rossi
- Filippa Lagerbäck
- Ermanno Veglietti
