= Fremont (film) =

- Directed by: Babak Jalali
- Written by: Carolina Cavalli; Babak Jalali
- Produced by: Marjaneh Moghimi; Sudnya Shroff; Rachael Fung; George Rush; Chris Martin; Laura Wagner
- Starring: Anaita Wali Zada; Gregg Turkington; Jeremy Allen White
- Cinematography: Laura Valladao
- Edited by: Babak Jalali
- Music by: Mahmood Schricker
- Production companies: A Butimar Productions; Extra A Productions; Blue Morning Pictures
- Distributed by: Music Box Films
- Release dates: January 20, 2023 (Sundance); August 25, 2023 (United States)
- Running time: 92 minutes
- Country: United States
- Languages: English; Dari; Cantonese
- Box office: $598,522

Fremont is a 2023 American drama film directed by Babak Jalali and co-written by Carolina Cavalli. It premiered at the Sundance Film Festival in the NEXT section on January 20, 2023, and screened at the 2023 SXSW Film Festival.

== Plot ==
Donya is an Afghan refugee living in Fremont, California after working as a translator for the United States Army in Afghanistan. She is struggling with insomnia and loneliness as she has only been in the United States for eight months.

She spends her day in nearby San Francisco working at a fortune cookie factory run by a married couple, the kind and outgoing Ricky and his wife, Lin, who appears to dislike Donya. Donya and her co-worker, Joanna, package the cookies while their older colleague, Fan, writes the fortunes.

The only people Donya interacts with are her neighbors, colleagues, and Aziz, who is the owner of a local Middle Eastern restaurant. One of her neighbors, Salim, is also an Afghan refugee. Salim offers Donya coffee, which she refuses for the reason that it would be even harder for her to sleep if she drank it.

Salim, knowing that Donya has been on the waitlist for a therapy session, gives her his therapist appointment card so she can go instead. She is disappointed when the therapist, Dr. Anthony, explains that he is unable to give her a prescription for sleeping pills until she attends several therapy sessions.

At work, Donya is tasked with writing the fortunes for the cookies after Fan unexpectedly dies. Though initially excited by the new opportunity, Donya soon starts to struggle to come up with fortunes due to her unhappiness.

As her sessions with Dr. Anthony continue, it is revealed that her insomnia is largely due to her survivor's guilt over leaving her family and others behind in Kabul. She explains that she was one of three translators in her base and was the only one who made it out of Afghanistan. One translator was killed while waiting for his visa to get approved and the other was still waiting for his paperwork to be processed when Donya left. Dr. Anthony suggests that her parents must have been proud of her for being the only female translator, but Donya explains that she was instead considered a traitor by people in their neighborhood and her family started receiving death threats.

Aziz can see how lonely Donya is and encourages her to start dating. She initially laughs it off, but later admits to Salim that she longs for a romantic partner, but feels it would be unfair if she met someone who made her happy since many are still suffering in her hometown. Salim agrees with Aziz and tells her to stop holding herself back because of something she cannot control.

Encouraged by their conversation, Donya impulsively writes down her phone number on one of the fortunes and puts it in a cookie. She is nearly fired after Lin discovers what Donya did, but Ricky refuses to fire her. To her surprise, Donya later receives a text from someone in Bakersfield asking to meet her at a pottery shop. He asks her to drive to Bakersfield so they can meet. Though initially hesitant, she grows increasingly excited by the idea that someone responded to her note after speaking to Joanna. She is sent an address and instructed to ask for “the Deer” when she arrives.

On her way to Bakersfield, Donya stops at an auto repair shop where she meets Daniel, the kind mechanic who owns the shop. Though they are clearly attracted to each other, Donya reluctantly rejects his attempts at forming a deeper connection since she is set on meeting the man from Bakersfield. Before leaving, she tries to pay for the cup of coffee he gave her, but Daniel doesn't accept her money and tells her that if she ever comes back, the coffee will still be free of charge for her.

Once Donya arrives at the pottery shop in Bakersfield, she is surprised when the employee simply hands her a small statue of a deer. Lin had given him Donya's number so he could make arrangements for her to pick up the statue Lin ordered for her office.

On her way back to Fremont, Donya returns to Daniel's auto shop. She gives him the deer statue, which he happily accepts, and she agrees to have another cup of coffee with him.

== Cast ==
- Anaita Wali Zada as Donya
- Gregg Turkington as Dr. Anthony
- Jeremy Allen White as Daniel
- Hilda Schmelling as Joanna
- Avis See-tho as Fan
- Siddique Ahmed as Salim
- Taban Ibraz as Mina
- Timur Nusratty as Suleyman
- Eddie Tang as Ricky
- Jennifer McKay as Lin
- Boots Riley as himself
- Alina Hubbard-Riley as herself

== Soundtrack ==
The sparsely scored, "moody" soundtrack by the Iranian-born Canadian composer Mahmood Schricker features himself playing the Persian setar, Scott Peterson on double bass, and Leandro Joaquim on baritone horn.

== Release ==
The film premiered at the Sundance Film Festival on January 20, 2023. It was released in theaters on August 25, 2023.

== Reception ==
On the review aggregator website Rotten Tomatoes, 97% of 36 critics' reviews are positive, with an average rating of 7.1/10. Metacritic, which uses a weighted average, assigned the film a score of 72 out of 100, based on 11 critics, indicating "generally favorable" reviews.

Reviewing the film for Variety, Tomris Laffry wrote, "The biggest achievement of Jalali here is the precise tone that he strikes with his mild-mannered movie: never cutesy...and always several feet deeper in its themes and deliberations around human isolation than meets the eye. Communicating with expressively wide-set eyes and the resolute gaze of someone who always knows and observes more than they admit, Zada's performance helps achieve the film's tricky balance...As the film's wistful lead, Zada gives the minor-key impression of an intriguing personality worth getting to know better and, who knows, maybe even solve the mysteries of the universe together." Laffry concluded, "In its final moments, the potency of Fremont sneaks up on you. You go in reluctant and even skeptical, and come out wondering how and why you're moved to tears."

The Observer's Wendy Ide described it as "admirably understated film-making" and praised Jeremy Allen White's performance which "tears out our hearts with two immaculate scenes of inarticulate longing."

Time Out included the film at 16th in their '48 Best Movies of 2023', arguing that it's not flattered by comparisons to the work of Jim Jarmusch and that it "deserves to be discovered on streaming."
