= Enea (film) =

2023 film by Pietro Castellitto

- Directed by: Pietro Castellitto
- Written by: Pietro Castellitto
- Produced by: Lorenzo Mieli; Luca Guadagnino
- Starring: Pietro Castellitto; Benedetta Porcaroli; Giorgio Quarzo Guarascio; Chiara Noschese; Sergio Castellitto
- Cinematography: Radek Ladczuk
- Edited by: Gianluca Scarpa
- Music by: Niccolò Contessa
- Production companies: The Apartment Pictures; Vision Distribution; Frenesy Film Company; Giovane Film
- Distributed by: Vision Distribution
- Release dates: 5 September 2023 (Venice); 11 January 2024 (Italy)
- Running time: 117 minutes
- Country: Italy
- Language: Italian
- Box office: $1.2 million

Enea is a 2023 Italian drama film written and directed by Pietro Castellitto, and starring Pietro Castellitto and Benedetta Porcaroli.

The film was selected to compete for the Golden Lion at the 80th Venice International Film Festival, where it premiered on 5 September 2023.

== Plot ==
The adventures of two young Italian men, Enea and Valentino, set against the hedonist backdrop of drugs and parties.

== Cast ==
- Pietro Castellitto as Enea
- Giorgio Quarzo Guarascio as Valentino
- Benedetta Porcaroli as Eva
- Chiara Noschese as Marina
- Giorgio Montanini as Oreste Dicembre
- Adamo Dionisi as Giordano
- Matteo Branciamore as Gabriel
- Cesare Castellitto as Brenno
- Sergio Castellitto as Celeste

== Release ==
Enea was selected to compete for the Golden Lion at the 80th Venice International Film Festival, where it had its world premiere on 5 September 2023. The film received a standing ovation of eight minutes. At the 2023 Zurich Film Festival, the film was invited to the Feature Film Competition. Vision Distribution theatrically released the film in Italy on 11 January 2024.

== Reception ==
=== Critical response ===
On the review aggregator website Rotten Tomatoes, 67% of 6 critics' reviews are positive, with an average rating of 5/10.

=== Accolades ===
Award	Date of ceremony	Category	Recipient(s)	Result	Ref.
Nastro d'Argento	27 June 2024	Best Director	Pietro Castellitto	Nominated	
Nastro d'Argento	27 June 2024	Best Screenplay	Pietro Castellitto	Nominated	
Nastro d'Argento	27 June 2024	Best Supporting Actress	Chiara Noschese	Nominated	
Nastro d'Argento	27 June 2024	Best Supporting Actor	Sergio Castellitto	Nominated	
Nastro d'Argento	27 June 2024	Best Production Design	Massimiliano Nocente	Nominated	
Nastro d'Argento	27 June 2024	Best Casting Director	Francesco Vedovati	Won	
Nastro d'Argento	27 June 2024	Best Score	Niccolò Contessa	Nominated	
Venice Film Festival	9 September 2023	Golden Lion	Pietro Castellitto	Nominated	
