= Twice Born =

2012 film by Sergio Castellitto

- Italian: Venuto al mondo
- Directed by: Sergio Castellitto
- Screenplay by: Sergio Castellitto; Margaret Mazzantini
- Story by: Margaret Mazzantini
- Produced by: Sergio Castellitto; Roberto Sessa
- Starring: Penélope Cruz; Emile Hirsch; Adnan Hasković; Saadet Aksoy; Pietro Castellitto; Luca De Filippo; Jane Birkin
- Distributed by: Entertainment One
- Release dates: 13 September 2012 (Toronto); 8 November 2012 (Italy); 11 January 2013 (Spain)
- Running time: 127 minutes
- Countries: Italy; Spain
- Languages: English; Italian; Bosnian
- Budget: €13 million

Twice Born (Italian: Venuto al mondo) is a 2012 drama film directed by Sergio Castellitto, which stars Penélope Cruz and Emile Hirsch. It is based on the novel Venuto al mondo by Margaret Mazzantini which won the Premio Campiello literary prize in 2009. Castellitto also co-wrote the screenplay.

== Plot ==
Oft-married Gemma visits Sarajevo with her only child, Pietro. The two of them had escaped the city sixteen years ago, just days after his birth during the Bosnian War. Diego, her second husband and Pietro's father, remained behind and later died. As they travel with her wartime friend Gojko, she tries to repair her relationship with Pietro, asking her third husband (by phone) if she should tell Pietro that she did not give birth to him. Gemma is later stunned by the revelation that Pietro's real mother, Aska, is still alive and married to Gojko. Aska reveals that, contrary to Gemma's long held belief, Diego was not Pietro's father, as she had been a sex slave to a garrison of the Serb Volunteer Guard. Gemma must face loss, the cost of war and the redemptive power of love.

== Cast ==
- Penélope Cruz as Gemma
- Emile Hirsch as Diego
- Adnan Hasković as Gojko
- Saadet Aksoy as Aska
- Pietro Castellitto as Pietro
- Luca De Filippo as Armando
- Sergio Castellitto as Giuliano
- Vinicio Marchioni as Fabio
- Mira Furlan as Velida
- Jane Birkin as Psychologist
- Branko Đurić as Doctor
- Isabelle Adriani as Giornalista
- Moamer Kasumović as Zoran
- Milan Pavlović

== Production ==
The film was shot over 15 weeks in digital using the Arri Alexa system.

== Release ==
The film had its world premiere at the 2012 Toronto International Film Festival. It was theatrically released in Spain on 11 January 2013.

== Reception ==
The film received negative critic reviews. It holds a 17% rating on Rotten Tomatoes based on 23 reviews.

About the film, The Hollywood Reporter wrote, "Dripping with floridly phony dialogue that no actor should be forced to speak, this paternity mystery uses the Bosnian conflict as the manipulative backdrop to a preposterously overwrought and overlong melodrama." Variety added that the film had "little to offer beyond some pitiful twists." Screen International went on to write, "director Sergio Castellitto’s adaptation of Margaret Mazzantini’s novel leaves no cliché unturned, yearning for big emotions that are consistently flattened by the lumbering storytelling."

== See also ==
- List of Italian films of 2012
- List of Spanish films of 2013
