= Bérénice Bejo =

Argentine-born French actress

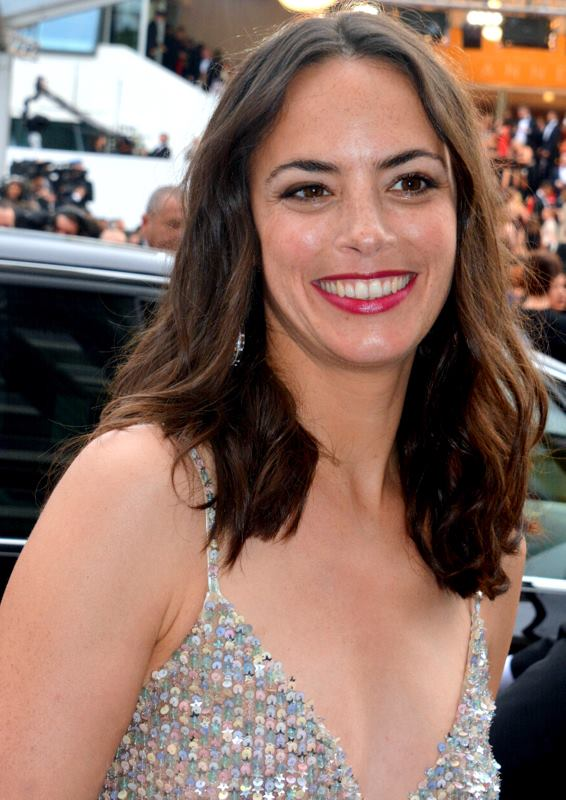
- Bejo in 2016
- Born: 7 July 1976 (age 50); Buenos Aires, Argentina
- Years active: 1993–present
- Spouse: Michel Hazanavicius
- Children: 2

Bérénice Bejo (French pronunciation: [beʁenis beʒo]) is a French-Argentine actress best known for playing Christiana in A Knight's Tale (2001) and Peppy Miller in The Artist (2011). Her work in the latter earned her a nomination for the Academy Award for Best Supporting Actress and won her the César Award for Best Actress. For her performance in The Past, she won Best Actress at the Cannes Film Festival in 2013 and was nominated for a César. She plays Alice Guy-Blaché, the first female film director, in the upcoming six-part drama series Alice.

== Early life and education ==
Bérénice Bejo was born in Buenos Aires, Argentina, and is the daughter of Argentine filmmaker Miguel Bejo and his wife Silvia, a lawyer. When she was three, her family moved to France, escaping from Argentina's most recent civil-military dictatorship (1976–1983).

== Career ==
In 2001 Bejo made her American film debut, playing the role of Christiana in A Knight's Tale opposite Heath Ledger. Christiana is a lady-in-waiting to Jocelyn (Shannyn Sossamon).

In 2002 she toured in France with Marie-France Pisier and Guillaume Depardieu.

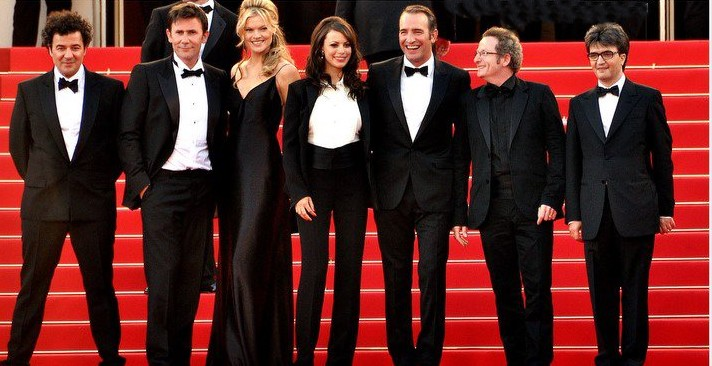
Selected cast and crew of The Artist at the 2011 Cannes Film Festival; (left to right) Ludovic Bource (composer), Michel Hazanavicius (director), Missi Pyle (actress), Bérénice Bejo (actress), Jean Dujardin (actor), Guillaume Schiffman (cinematographer), and Thomas Langmann (producer)

In 2003 Bejo starred as Olivia in 24 Hours in the Life of a Woman by Laurent Bouhnik.

Under the direction of Steve Suissa, she seduces Stephane Freiss and Titoff in The Grand Role (2004), a comedy about the world of actors, and she also starred in Cavalcade (2005), a drama dealing with the theme of disability.

In 2006 she appeared alongside Jean Dujardin in OSS 117: Cairo, Nest of Spies by Michel Hazanavicius. This was the first collaboration of the trio.

In 2007 she made an appearance in the short film La Pomme d'Adam.

In 2008 she appeared in two romantic comedies: Modern Love Bouquet and Stéphane Kazandjian. That same year, she gave birth to her first child by Hazanavicius.

In 2009 she participated in the documentary by Serge Bromberg, Henri-Georges Clouzot's Inferno. The documentary reconstructs Clouzot's film, alternating between scenes from the 1964 film and dialogue readings between Jacques Gamblin (for Serge Reggiani) and Bejo (for Romy Schneider).

In the 2011 film The Artist, which was directed by Hazanavicius and stars Dujardin, Bejo plays Peppy Miller, a 1920s film actress. Her performance was critically acclaimed, receiving the César Award for Best Actress and several award nominations: the Screen Actors Guild Award for Outstanding Performance by a Female Actor in a Supporting Role, the Golden Globe Award for Best Supporting Actress – Motion Picture award, the BAFTA Award for Best Actress in a Leading Role, and the Academy Award for Best Supporting Actress.

In 2012 she was announced as the host of the opening and closing ceremonies at the 2012 Cannes Film Festival. Also in 2012, she voiced the role of Mérida in the French dub of the Disney/Pixar animated film Brave. In June 2012 Bejo was invited to join the Academy of Motion Picture Arts and Sciences.

She has been announced to star as Alice Guy-Blaché, the first female film director, in the upcoming six-part Wild Bunch TV / HBO / France Télévisions drama series Alice. The series is co-created by Irish playwright Tim Loane and along with Claire Lemaréchal, and co-written by Loane, Lemaréchal, and André Gulluni. It is due for release in 2026.

== Recognition and awards ==
Bejo received the Prix Romy Schneider in 2012.

For her performance in The Past, she won Best Actress at the Cannes Film Festival in 2013.

== Personal life ==
In 2006 Bejo met director Michel Hazanavicius when she was acting in OSS 117: Cairo, Nest of Spies, whom she later married. They have two children.

== Filmography ==
Year	Title	Role	Notes
1993	Pain perdu		Short
1996	Les sœurs Hamlet	Karine	
1996	Histoires d'hommes	Laurence	TV movie
1996	L'amour est à réinventer	The girl	TV series (1 Episode)
1997	Julie Lescaut	Lila	TV series (1 Episode)
1997	Le juge est une femme	Raphaëlle Fauvet-Colombin	TV series (1 Episode)
1997	Un et un font six	Sophie	TV series (6 Episodes)
1999	Sapajou contre Sapajou	Emma Verdier	TV movie
2000	Most Promising Young Actress	Laetitia Rance	Nominated – César Award for Most Promising Actress
2000	La Captive	Sarah	
2000	Passionnément	Faustine	
2000	Les redoutables		TV series (1 Episode)
2000	Sauvetage	Valentine	TV series (6 Episodes)
2001	A Knight's Tale	Christiana	
2002	24 Hours in the Life of a Woman	Olivia	
2002	Comme un avion	Lola	
2002	Une petite fée	The young woman	Short
2002	Vertiges	Margo	TV series (1 Episode)
2003	Dans le rouge du couchant	The girl on the boat	
2003	Dissonances	Margo	
2003	Sem Ela	Fanfan Vieira	
2003	Jeux de plage	Marthe	Short
2004	Le grand rôle	Perla Kurtz	
2004	Ciao bambino	Liccia	Short
2004	Sans douleur		Short
2005	Cavalcade	Manon	
2006	OSS 117: Cairo, Nest of Spies	Larmina El Akmar Betouche	
2006	Nuages	Cécile Marsac	TV movie
2007	La maison	Cloé	
2007	13 m²	Sophie	
2007	Un homme peut en cacher un autre	Inès / Adèle	Short
2008	Modern Love	Elsa	
2008	Bouquet final	Claire	
2008	Le courrier du parc	The young woman	Short
2008	Sa raison d'être	Fabienne	TV movie
2009	La pomme d'Adam	Girl on the metro	Short
2010	La Traque	Claire	
2010	Love Me Baby	Marie	Short
2011	The Artist	Peppy Miller	César Award for Best Actress; Capri Actress Award; Hollywood Film Festival Spotlight Award; Phoenix Film Critics Soc. Award: Best Supporting Actress; Santa Barbara International Film Festival – Cinema Vanguard Award; St. Louis Gateway Film Critics Association Award for Best Supporting Actress; Women Film Critics Cicle Award for Best Screen Couple (with Jean Dujardin); Lumière Award for Best Actress; Nominated – Academy Award for Best Supporting Actress; Nominated – Golden Globe Award for Best Supporting Actress – Motion Picture; Nominated – BAFTA Award: Best Actress in a Leading Role; Nominated – Screen Actors Guild Award for Outstanding Performance by a Female Actor in a Supporting Role; Nominated – Screen Actors Guild Award for Outstanding Performance by a Cast in a Motion Picture; Nominated – Alliance of Women Film Journalists Award for Best Supporting Actress; Nominated – ALMA Award for Favorite Movie Actress - Comedy/Musical; Nominated – Broadcast Film Critics Association Award for Best Supporting Actress; Nominated – Broadcast Film Critics Association Award for Best Cast; Nominated – Dallas–Fort Worth Film Critics Association Award for Best Supporting Actress; Nominated – Detroit Film Critics Society Award for Best Supporting Actress; Nominated – Georgia Film Critics Association Award for Best Supporting Actress; Nominated – San Diego Film Critics Society Award for Best Supporting Actress; Nominated – Washington D.C. Area Film Critics Association Award for Best Supporting Actress
2012	Populaire	Marie Taylor	
2012	Aujourd'hui	Louise	Short
2012	Brave	Mérida's voice	European French Version
2013	The Past	Marie Brisson	Cannes Film Festival Award for Best Actress; FIPRESCI Prize for Best Actress of the Year in a Foreign-Language Film; Nominated – César Award for Best Actress; Nominated – CinEuphoria Award for Best Actress; Nominated – CinEuphoria Award for Best Ensemble
2013	Au bonheur des ogres	Aunt Julia	
2014	The Search	Carole	
2014	Le Dernier Diamant	Julia	
2014	Frères d'armes	Voice	TV Mini-Series
2016	The Childhood of a Leader	The Mother	
2016	After Love	Marie	
2016	Sweet Dreams	Elisa	
2016	Eternity	Gabrielle	
2017	Redoubtable	Michèle Rosier	
2017	Three Peaks	Lea	
2018	The Extraordinary Journey of the Fakir	Nelly Marnay	
2018	Funan	Chou (voice)	
2018	La Quietud	Eugenia	
2018	Le Jeu	Marie	
2020	Le Prince oublié	La voisine / La femme à la porte	
2020	Le Bonheur des uns...	Léa Monteil	
2021	A Bookshop in Paris	Yolande	
2021	Shake Your Cares Away	Alma	
2021	The Man in the Basement	Hélène Sandberg	
2022	Final Cut	Nadia	
2022	The Hummingbird	Luisa Lattes	
2023	The Movie Teller	María Magnolia	
2024	Another End	Ebe	
2024	Under Paris	Sophia	Netflix Original

== Theatre ==
Year	Title	Author	Director	Theater
1999	The Threepenny Opera	Bertolt Brecht	Steve Kalfa	Théâtre des Champs-Élysées
2016	Tout ce que vous voulez	Matthieu Delaporte, Alexandre de La Patellière	Bernard Murat	Théâtre Édouard VII
