= Annamaria Morelli =

Italian producer and screenwriter

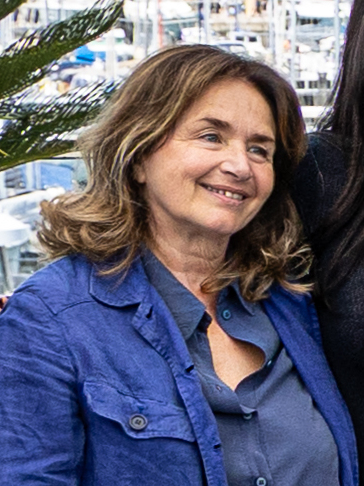
- Morelli at the 2025 Cannes Film Festival
- Occupations: Producer; screenwriter
- Years active: 2001–present

Annamaria Morelli is an Italian film and television producer and screenwriter.

== Career ==
Morelli began her career as a story editor for RAI. In 2017, she was named head of production of TIMvision, a position she held until her resignation in 2019. That year, she launched the production company Elsinore Film, which entered into a development and production agreement with StudioCanal in 2022.

In February 2024, she was named CEO of The Apartment, a subsidiary of Fremantle. Later that year, she participated in the L'ascesa delle donne nell'industria tv e cinematografica italiana panel at the 81st Venice International Film Festival. The following year, she participated in the Il cinema e le serie tv per il territorio panel at the 82nd Venice International Film Festival.

== Filmography ==
=== Film ===
Year	Title	Producer	Writer	Ref.
2001	Se fossi in te	No	Yes	
2014	Nottetempo	Yes	Yes	
2018	Bob & Marys - Criminali a domicilio	Yes	Yes	
2019	Bangla	Yes	No	
2019	Il colpo del cane	Yes	No	
2019	Bellissime	Yes	No	
2021	Anima bella	Yes	No	
2022	Amanda	Yes	No	
2022	Ghost Night	Yes	No	
2025	Fuori	Yes	No	
2025	La grazia	Yes	No	
2025	The Kidnapping of Arabella	Yes	No	
2025	Father Mother Sister Brother	Executive	No	
2026	Rosebush Pruning	Yes	No	
TBA	Föa	Yes	No	
TBA	Ketticè	Yes	No	

=== Television ===
Year	Title	Network	Notes	Ref.
2018	Dark Polo Gang - La serie	TIMvision	Producer; 12 episodes	
2018–2019	Skam Italia	TIMvision	Producer; 32 episodes	

== Awards and nominations ==
Award	Year	Category	Nominated work	Result	Ref.
David di Donatello	2020	Best Producer	Bangla	Nominated	
