= 18 Presents =

2020 Italian drama film directed by Francesco Amato

- Film poster
- Italian: 18 regali
- Directed by: Francesco Amato
- Written by: Francesco Amato; Massimo Gaudioso; Davide Lantieri; Alessio Vincenzotto
- Starring: Vittoria Puccini; Benedetta Porcaroli; Edoardo Leo
- Music by: Andrea Farri
- Production companies: Lucky Red; 3 Marys Entertainment; Rai Cinema
- Distributed by: Vision Distribution
- Release date: 2 January 2020
- Running time: 115 minutes
- Country: Italy
- Language: Italian

18 Presents (Italian: 18 regali) is a 2020 Italian drama film written and directed by Francesco Amato, with Vittoria Puccini, Benedetta Porcaroli and Edoardo Leo in lead roles. The film is based on an actual Italian woman, Elisa Girotto, who had planned and allocated 17 years of birthday gifts for her daughter Anna before her death in September 2017 due to a terminal breast cancer. Girotto had been diagnosed with cancer at the time that she gave birth to her daughter, in August 2016 at the age of 40. The film was released on 2 January 2020, and received positive reviews for its emotional screenplay. Elisa's husband Alessio Vincenzotto was also credited for his story about his wife. It was also streamed on Netflix on 8 May 2020, which was Mothers' Day in the United States.

== Plot ==
A pregnant mother Elisa (Vittoria Puccini) gives birth to her baby daughter Anna (Benedetta Porcaroli) and attempts to be part of her life by allocating 18 sentimental emotional gifts for her unborn daughter, soon after realising that she has breast cancer. Elisa does this during her remaining days, to allow Anna to receive her birthday gifts every year on her birthday until age 18. Elisa dies shortly after giving birth and Anna gets to know about her mother's love and sacrifice after growing up and feels guilty.

== Cast ==
- Vittoria Puccini as Elisa Girotto
- Benedetta Porcaroli as Anna Vincenzotto
- Edoardo Leo as Alessio Vincenzotto
- Sara Lazzaro as Carla
- Marco Messeri as Nonno
- Betty Pedrazzi as Nonna

== Production ==
Principal photography commenced in 2019 and was produced jointly by Lucky Red, 3 Marys Entertainment and Rai Cinema. The film's trailer was released on 11 December 2019.

== Reception ==
As of October 2021, the film holds a 60% approval rating on Rotten Tomatoes, based on five reviews with an average rating of 6.2/10.

User-generated website "Bechdel Test" lists '18 Presents' as one of the 2020 women-oriented films.
