= Che tempo che fa =

Italian late-night talk show

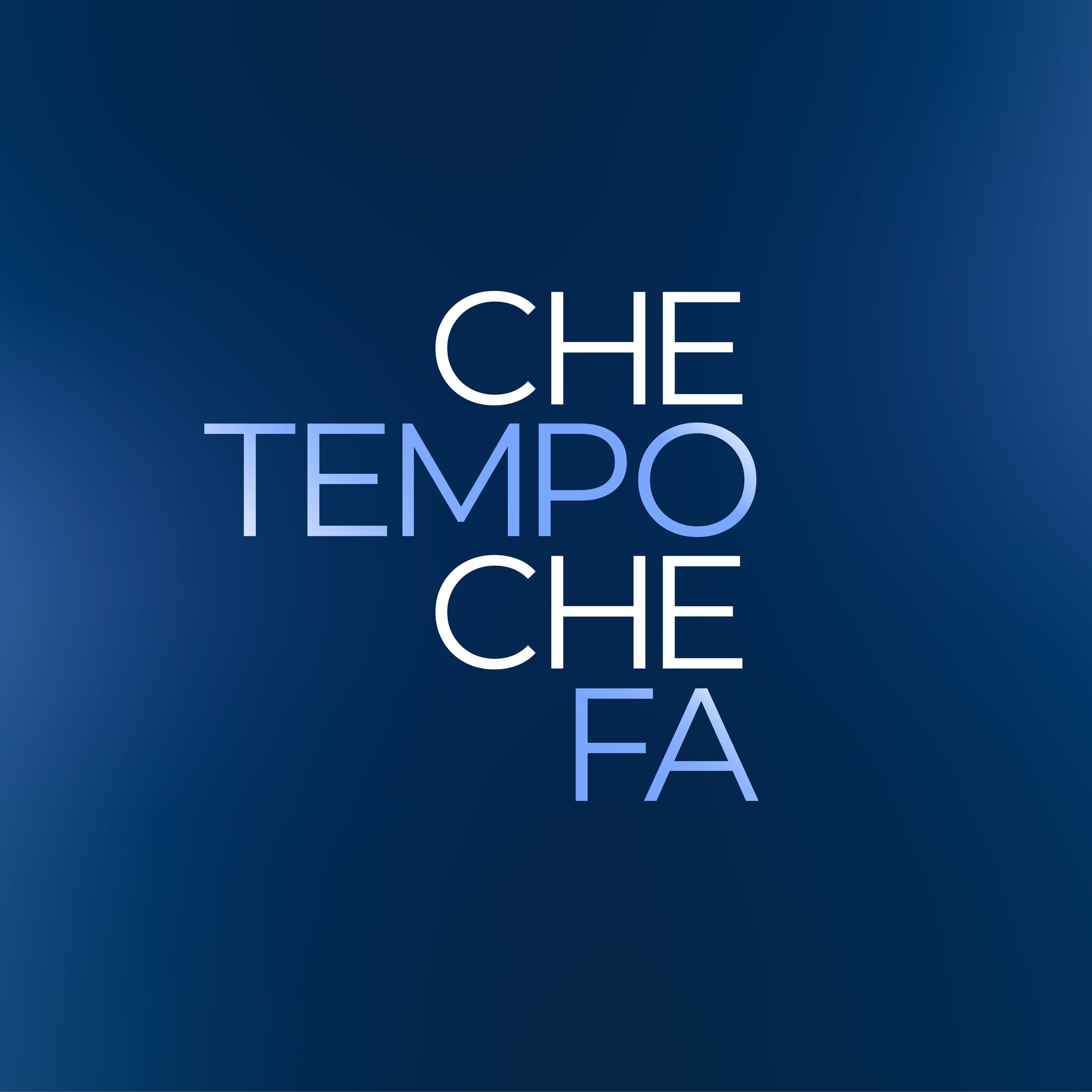
- Presented by: Fabio Fazio; Luciana Littizzetto; Filippa Lagerbäck
- Country of origin: Italy
- Original language: Italian
- No. of seasons: 21

Production
- Executive producers: Enrico Rimoldi (2003–06); Duccio Forzano (2006–16); Cristian Biondani (2016–21); Stefano Vicario (2021–22); Cristiano d'Alisera (since 2022)
- Production locations: Milan's Rai studios (2003–23); Milan's Soul Movie Centro di Produzione 6 (since 2023)
- Running time: 180 minutes 270 minutes (since 2023)

Original release
- Network: Rai 3 (2003–17; 2020–23); Rai 1 (2017–19); Rai 2 (2019–20); Nove (since 2023)
- Release: 13 September 2003 – present

Che tempo che fa (Italian for 'What the weather is like' / 'What the times are like', pronounced [ke tˈtɛmpo ke fˈfa]) is an Italian television late-night talk show hosted by Fabio Fazio, supported by Luciana Littizzetto and Filippa Lagerbäck. It has been broadcast live on Saturdays and Sundays on the Italian TV since 2003.

The show has been aired since 13 September 2003 on Rai 3 up to 4 June 2017. On 24 September 2017 it moved to Rai 1, until 2 June 2019. On 29 September 2019 the show moved to Rai 2, and in September 2020 it went back on Rai 3. In May 2023, public broadcaster RAI decided to not renew the show for a new season. On 15 October 2023 the show premiered for its 21st season on Nove.

Che tempo che fa is a one-to-one talk show with guests every weekend night. Current events, political, economic, sporting, musical, literary, cinematic, scientific, nature and environmental issues of topical interest are discussed. Fazio's feature is having friendly conversations rather than formal interviews. During its permanence on Rai 3, its prime-time share was of 15%, with an audience of 3,500,000 people, which raised up to 21% (around 5,000,000 people) with its first venue on Rai 1.

== Notable guests ==
Through years the show hosted many Italian and international guests. Amongst them there are: Pope Francis, Mikhail Gorbachev, John Landis, Bill Gates, Coldplay, Gustavo Dudamel, Daniel Barenboim, Claudio Abbado, Mark Knopfler, Kylie Minogue, Oasis, Cherie Blair, Condoleezza Rice, Pedro Almodóvar, Hugh Grant, Vandana Shiva, Tony Blair, Phil Collins, Robert Plant, Annie Lennox, Ricky Martin, Zygmunt Bauman, Lou Reed, James Taylor, Penélope Cruz, Diego Armando Maradona, Jean Dujardin, Matt Damon, George Clooney, Stromae, Novak Djokovic, U2, Jane Fonda, Madonna, Noel Gallagher, Yanis Varoufakis, Adele, Charlize Theron, Dua Lipa, Russell Crowe, Ryan Gosling, LP, Tony Hawk, Naomi Campbell, Ed Sheeran, Olivia O'Brien, Carl Lewis, Anastacia, Vincent Cassel, Lewis Hamilton, Tom Hanks, Meryl Streep, Boris Becker, Alice Merton, Alain Delon, Rowan Atkinson, Michael Bublé, Emmanuel Macron, Jean-Claude Juncker, John Travolta, Ron Howard, John Bercow, Uma Thurman, Charles Leclerc, Sebastian Vettel, Anthony Fauci, Ken Follett, Whoopi Goldberg, Dan Brown, Greta Thunberg, Michael Houghton, Glenn Close, Robbie Williams, Susan Sarandon, Barack Obama, Nancy Pelosi, Pelé, Matthew McConaughey, Woody Allen, Sharon Stone, Brian May, Quentin Tarantino, Lady Gaga, Christine Lagarde, Roberta Metsola, Sean Penn, Jens Stoltenberg, Carlo Rovelli, Rafael Nadal, Richard Gere, Austin Butler, Magic Johnson, Timothée Chalamet, Daniel Pennac, Emmanuel Carrère, Ben Affleck, Steve Martin, Anthony Hopkins, David Grossman, Willem Dafoe, Wim Wenders, Martin Scorsese, António Guterres, Josh O'Connor, Mike Faist, Zendaya, Ursula von der Leyen, Pep Guardiola, Al Pacino, Johnny Depp, Sting, Angela Merkel, Michael Bublé, Adrien Brody, Daniel Craig and Usain Bolt.

== Series overview ==
Series	Episodes	Originally released		
Series	Episodes	First released	Last released	Network
1	102 (Note: On season 1 the show aired on Friday from 8.10 pm to 8.30 pm, and on Saturday and Sunday from 8.10 pm to 9 pm.)	13 September 2003	30 May 2004	Rai 3
2	82 (Note: From season 2 the show aired on Saturday and Sunday from 8.10 pm to 9 pm.)	2 October 2004	22 May 2005	Rai 3
3	60	10 September 2005	28 May 2006	Rai 3
4	61	1 October 2006	27 May 2007	Rai 3
5	66	29 September 2007	25 May 2008	Rai 3
6	66	4 October 2008	31 May 2009	Rai 3
7	64	3 October 2009	6 June 2010	Rai 3
8	65	2 October 2010	29 May 2011	Rai 3
9	70	17 September 2011	27 May 2012	Rai 3
10	65	30 September 2012	26 May 2013	Rai 3
11	66	28 September 2013	25 May 2014	Rai 3
12	34 (Note: From season 12 the show aired only on Sunday from 8 pm to 9.45 pm, while on Saturday it was substituted by the spin-off Che Fuori Tempo Che Fa hosted by Fabio Fazio.)	28 September 2014	13 June 2015	Rai 3
13	34	27 September 2015	12 June 2016	Rai 3
14	35 (Note: From season 14 the show aired on Sunday from 8 pm to 9.30 pm and Che Fuori Tempo Che Fa moved on Sunday from 9.30 pm to 10.45 pm.)	25 September 2016	4 June 2017	Rai 3
15	32 (Note: From season 15 the show aired on Sunday from 8.30 pm to 12 am, while Che Fuori che Tempo Che Fa moved on Monday from 11 pm to 12 am.)	24 September 2017	3 June 2018	Rai 1
16	31	23 September 2018	2 June 2019	Rai 1
17	31 (Note: From season 17 the show aired on Sunday from 9 pm to 12 am.)	29 September 2019	24 May 2020	Rai 2
18	31 (Note: From season 18 the show has aired on Sunday from 8 pm to 12 am.)	27 September 2020	30 May 2021	Rai 3
19	30	3 October 2021	29 May 2022	Rai 3
20	31	9 October 2022	28 May 2023	Rai 3
21	26	15 October 2023	12 May 2024	Nove
22	28	6 October 2024	18 May 2025	Nove
23	28	5 October 2025	24 May 2026	Nove
24	TBA	11 October 2026	TBA	Nove
