= Amanda (2022 film) =

2022 film by Carolina Cavalli

- Theatrical release poster
- Directed by: Carolina Cavalli
- Written by: Carolina Cavalli
- Produced by: Moreno Zani; Malcom Pagani; Mario Gianani; Lorenzo Gangarossa; Antonio Celsi; Annamaria Morelli
- Starring: Benedetta Porcaroli; Galatea Bellugi; Michele Bravi; Monica Nappo; Margherita Maccapani Missoni; Giovanna Mezzogiorno
- Cinematography: Lorenzo Levrini
- Edited by: Babak Jalali
- Music by: Niccolò Contessa
- Production companies: Elsinore Film; Wildside; Tenderstories; Charades; I Wonder Pictures
- Distributed by: I Wonder Pictures
- Release dates: 5 September 2022 (Venice); 13 October 2022 (Italy)
- Running time: 94 minutes
- Country: Italy
- Language: Italian
- Box office: $133,108

Amanda is a 2022 Italian coming-of-age comedy-drama film written and directed by Carolina Cavalli in her feature directorial debut. It stars Benedetta Porcaroli as the title character, a lonely and socially awkward young woman from a wealthy family who becomes determined to reconnect with a childhood friend (played by Galatea Bellugi). Michele Bravi, Monica Nappo, Margherita Maccapani Missoni and Giovanna Mezzogiorno appear in supporting roles.

The film premiered in the Horizons Extra section of the 79th Venice International Film Festival, and was later screened at the 2022 Toronto International Film Festival. It was released theatrically in Italy on 13 October 2022 by I Wonder Pictures.

== Plot ==
In the 2000s, Amanda is an aimless 25-year-old Italian woman who feels alienated from her wealthy family—particularly her mother and her older sister—and struggles to form meaningful social connections after finishing school in Paris. Despite having the opportunity to work in her family's pharmacy business, she instead spends her time wandering the city, frequenting the local cinematheque and raves in search of friends, trying to forge online connections via video chat rooms while staying in a hotel room funded by her parents, and visiting an aging horse tied up at a nearby farm.

At her mother's suggestion, Amanda visits Rebecca, the daughter of her mother's friend Viola and a childhood friend she has not seen for many years. A former athlete, Rebecca lives a reclusive life, rarely leaving her room and regularly attending psychotherapy sessions at home. After Rebecca slams her bedroom door on Amanda without saying a word, Amanda learns from Viola that she and Rebecca were inseparable as toddlers before Amanda's family moved away. Convinced that she and Rebecca could have been best friends all along, Amanda becomes determined to rekindle their friendship.

After Amanda repeatedly tries to force her way into Rebecca's room, Rebecca finally lets Amanda in and they warm up to each other. At a rave, Amanda meets a boy whom she suspects is a drug dealer, but he clarifies he hands out free condoms at raves. The two go out to eat and become acquainted, after which Amanda saves his contact as "My Boyfriend" on her phone. When the boy invites Amanda to his upcoming birthday party, telling her she can bring someone, she invites Rebecca to accompany her. As the two girls continue to spend time together, Amanda moves in temporarily with Rebecca, though Amanda becomes jealous of Rebecca's therapist, Ann.

The boy from the rave tells Amanda to stop texting him incessantly as he is dating another girl, leaving her heartbroken. Back at Rebecca's house, Ann instructs Amanda to tell Rebecca that she is leaving for Paris, before declaring that Amanda's borderline personality traits are not good for Rebecca. In despair, Amanda flees, steals the horse and returns to Rebecca's house with the horse, leaving it in the garden. She then goes to Rebecca's room and tries to persuade her to run away with her, but Rebecca agrees with Ann's assessment and reveals that Viola made Rebecca befriend Amanda when they were children because everyone felt sorry for Amanda. Devastated, Amanda leaves.

Amanda moves back into her family's villa, and her relationship with her mother and sister gradually improves. Viola approaches Amanda, asking her to reunite with Rebecca. Amanda tells Viola that Rebecca can find her at the local cinematheque, but Rebecca never shows up. Later, the boy from the rave accuses Amanda of crashing his party the previous night and setting off firecrackers in his living room, but she denies it. Realizing that this was Rebecca's doing, Amanda goes to her house and thanks her. Rebecca confesses that she rode to the party on horseback, but the firecrackers scared off the horse. Amanda and Rebecca set off in search of the horse, suggesting a tentative reconciliation.

== Cast ==
- Benedetta Porcaroli as Amanda
- Galatea Bellugi as Rebecca
- Michele Bravi as Dude
- Monica Nappo as Sofia, Amanda's mother
- Margherita Maccapani Missoni as Marina, Amanda's older sister
- Ana Cecilia Ponce as Judy, the housekeeper
- Amelia Elisabetta Biuso as Stella, Marina's eight-year-old daughter
- Giovanna Mezzogiorno as Viola
- Giorgia Favoti as Ann

== Production ==
Amanda was shot entirely in Turin over five weeks, with locations including the neighborhood of San Salvario, Cinema Maffei, the Hotel Gardenia, Poveri Vecchi, along the panoramic road of Via dei Colli in Pino Torinese, Royal Pet Shop in Chivasso, Borgo Cornalese in Villastellone, and the Circolo Ippico in San Raffaele Cimena.

== Reception ==
On the review aggregator website Rotten Tomatoes, the film holds an approval rating of 95% based on 44 reviews, with an average rating of 7.3/10. The website's critics consensus reads, "A is for Amanda, an amusingly absurd coming-of-age comedy that offers poignant observations and positions director Carolina Cavalli as a talent to watch." Metacritic, which uses a weighted average, assigned the film a score of 81 out of 100, based on 10 critics, indicating "universal acclaim".

Peter Bradshaw of The Guardian described it as "a film of style and surface, and these are cleverly created and maintained." Wendy Ide of Screen Daily called the film "a refreshingly unconventional and acidic deadpan comic portrait of an offbeat female friendship." Beatrice Loayza of The New York Times selected the film as "New York Times Critics' Pick", writing, "Amanda is absurd and abrasive, but also sympathetic thanks to Porcaroli's performance."
