= Benedetta Porcaroli =

Italian actress (born 1998)

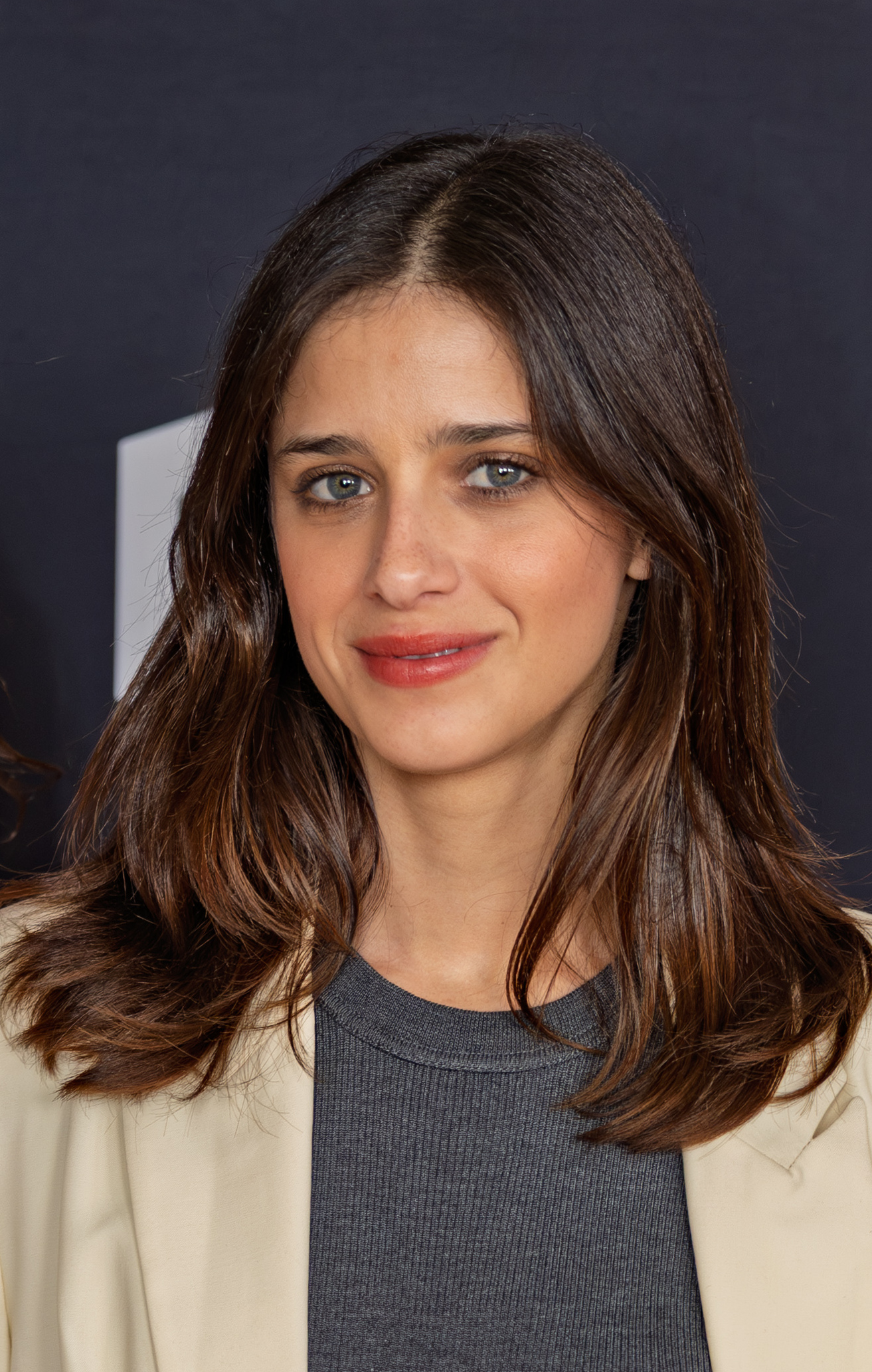
- Porcaroli in 2026
- Born: 11 June 1998 (age 28); Rome, Italy
- Occupation: Actress
- Years active: 2015–present
- Partner: Riccardo Scamarcio (2021–present)

Benedetta Porcaroli (born 11 June 1998) is an Italian actress. She drew international attention for portraying Chiara Altieri in the Netflix teen drama series Baby (2018–2020). She subsequently starred in the drama films 18 Presents (2020) and The Catholic School (2021), in the comedy-drama film Amanda and in the horror film Immaculate (2024). She was also featured as a series regular in the historical drama miniseries The Leopard (2025).

For her performance in The Kidnapping of Arabella (2025), Porcaroli won the Orizzonti award for Best Actress at the 82nd Venice International Film Festival.

== Early life and education ==
Benedetta Porcaroli was born in Rome, Italy. She has a younger brother named Guglielmo. She studied at the liceo classico Mamiani di Roma, then entered the University of Rome to study philosophy.

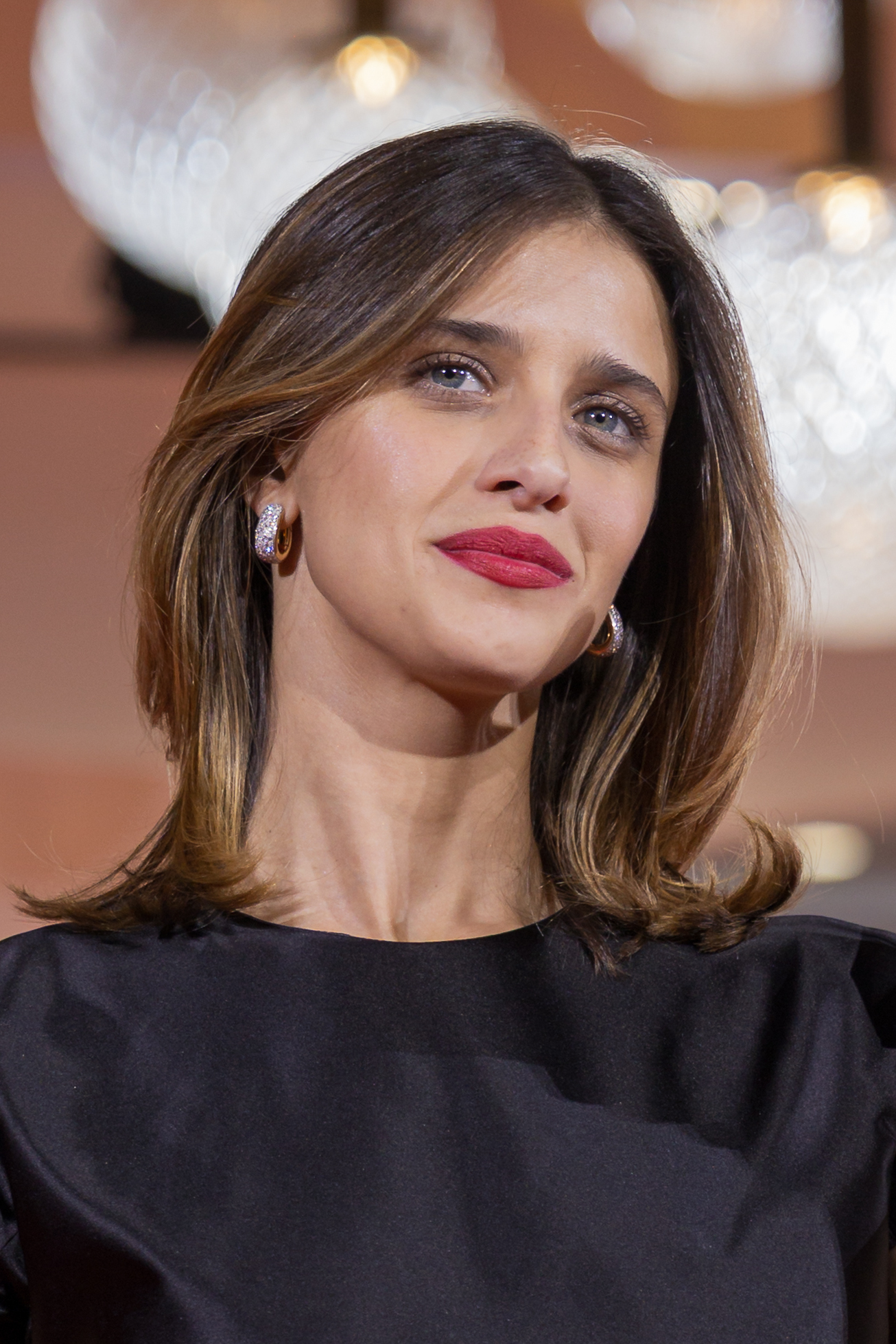
Porcaroli at 82nd Venice International Film Festival

== Career ==
Porcaroli's debut on TV was in Rai 1 series Tutto può succedere (2015–18) where she played Federica Ferraro.

== Personal life ==
She dated Italian actor and director Michele Alhaique from 2018 to 2021. Since 2021, she has been in a relationship with Italian actor and producer, Riccardo Scamarcio.

== Filmography ==
=== Film ===
Year	Title	Role	Notes
2016	Perfect Strangers	Sofia	Feature film debut
2018	Sconnessi	Stella	
2018	As Needed	Giulietta	
2018	Reckless	The Young Star	
2018	Tutte le mie notti	Sara	
2020	18 Presents	Anna	
2020	The Croods: A New Age	Dawn Betterman	Voice, Italian dub
2021	The Catholic School	Donatella Colasanti	
2021	7 Women and a Murder	Caterina	
2022	The Shadow of the Day	Anna	
2022	Amanda	Amanda	
2022	The Hummingbird	Adele Carrera	
2023	Enea	Eva	
2023	Vangelo secondo Maria	Maria	
2024	Immaculate	Sister Gwen	
2025	The Kidnapping of Arabella	Holly	

=== Television ===
Year	Title	Role	Notes
2015–2018	Tutto può succedere	Federica Ferraro	42 episodes
2018	Thou Shalt Not Kill	Alice	Episode: "Episodio 17"
2018–2020	Baby	Chiara Altieri	18 episodes
2025	The Leopard	Concetta	6 episodes
2026	The Gentlemen	Isabella "Bella" Soranza de Parme	6 episodes

=== Music videos ===
Year	Title	Role	Notes
2019	"Maradona y Pelé"	Thegiornalisti	
2020	"16 marzo"	Achille Lauro	

== Awards and nominations ==
Year	Award	Category	Nominated work	Result
2019	Nastro d'Argento	Prize "Guglielmo Biraghi"	Baby	Won
2020	Nastro d'Argento	Best Supporting Actress	18 Presents	Nominated
2021	David di Donatello	Best Supporting Actress	18 Presents	Nominated
2023	David di Donatello	Best Actress	Amanda	Pending
2025	Orizzonti Award	Best Actress	The Kidnapping of Arabella	Won

== Bibliography ==
- Hipkins, Danielle (2025). "Benedetta Porcaroli: "Don't Call Me Baby"". In Barra, Luca; Formenti, Cristina; Pierini, Mariapaola; Pitassio, Francesco (eds.). Italian Contemporary Screen Performers. Training, Production, Prestige. Palgrave Macmillan. pp. 65–72. doi:10.1007/978-3-031-67310-8. ISBN 978-3-031-67309-2.
