= Sergio Castellitto =

Italian actor, film director, and screenwriter (born 1953)

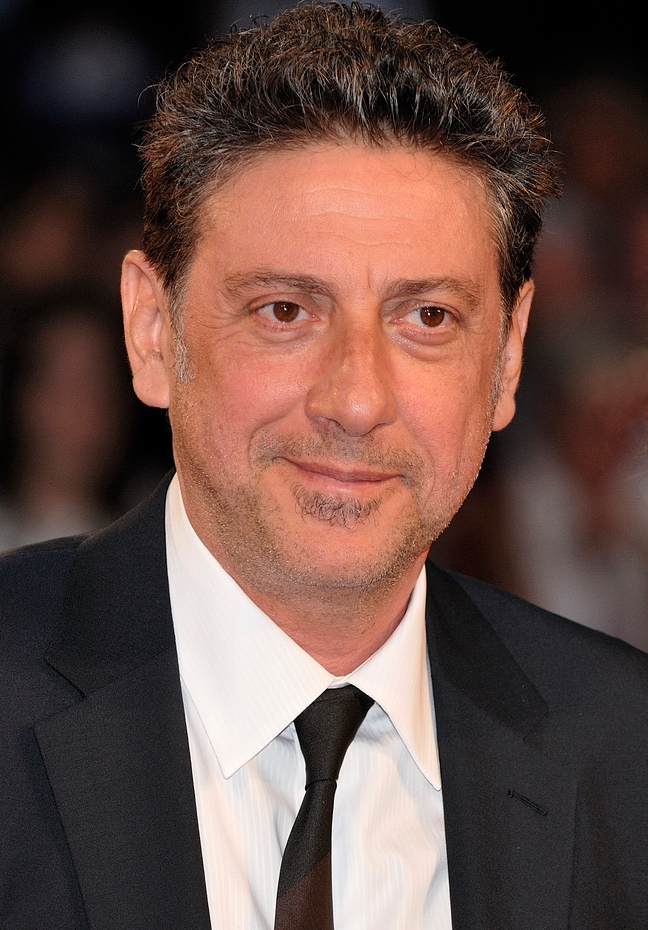
- Castellitto at the 66th Venice International Film Festival, September 2009
- Born: 18 August 1953 (age 73); Rome, Italy
- Occupations: Actor; filmmaker
- Years active: 1981–present
- Spouse: Margaret Mazzantini (m. 1987)
- Children: 4, including Pietro Castellitto

Sergio Castellitto (born 18 August 1953) is an Italian actor and filmmaker whose career spans more than four decades, having appeared in more than 70 films across comedy, drama, adventure, and other genres. He has starred in dramas such as My Mother's Smile (2002), Don't Move (2004), and Twice Born (2012), while also reaching international audiences with roles in Mostly Martha (2001) and The Chronicles of Narnia: Prince Caspian (2008). He has often collaborated with his wife, author and screenwriter Margaret Mazzantini, who wrote several films he directed and starred in. In addition to multiple Italian film honors, Castellitto has been recognized with European and North American awards, and in 2024 he was part of the ensemble cast of Conclave, which won the 2025 Screen Actors Guild Award.

== Biography ==
Sergio Castellitto was born in Rome in 1953, to parents from Molise and Abruzzo, Southern Italy. After graduating from the Silvio D'Amico National Academy of Dramatic Art in 1978, he began his theatrical career in Italian public theater with Shakespeare's Measure for Measure at the Teatro di Roma and with roles in other plays such as La Madre by Brecht, Merchant of Venice, and Candelaio by Giordano Bruno. At the Teatro di Genova he starred in the roles of Tuzenbach in Chekhov's Three Sisters and Jean in Strindberg's Miss Julie, both under the direction of Otomar Krejča. In the coming years, he also starred in such theatrical productions as L'infelicità senza desideri and Piccoli equivoci at the Festival dei Due Mondi in Spoleto. He also appeared in Barefoot in the Park by Neil Simon. During his years in the theatre, he worked alongside many famous actors, including Luigi Squarzina, Aldo Trionfo, and Enzo Muzii.

Castellitto began his film career in 1983 beside Marcello Mastroianni and Michel Piccoli in The General of the Dead Army by Luciano Tovoli. He appeared in many films including Sembra morto...ma è solo svenuto directed by Felice Farina, Little Misunderstandings by Ricky Tognazzi and Stasera a casa di Alice by Carlo Verdone. He became more famous with the films The Great Pumpkin by Francesca Archibugi and The Star Maker by Giuseppe Tornatore.

In the late 1980s, Castellitto appeared in several Italian television miniseries, including Un siciliano in Sicilia (1987), Cinque storie inquietanti (1987), Piazza Navona (1988), Cinéma (1988), and Come stanno bene insieme (1989). He also appeared in the miniseries Victoire, ou la douleur des femmes (2000).

Success arrived with the films La famiglia, L'ultimo bacio, Caterina in the Big City, My Mother's Smile, Mostly Martha, and especially with Don't Move, written by his wife Margaret Mazzantini. Other films that he interpreted include Il regista di matrimoni by Marco Bellocchio and La stella che non c'è by Gianni Amelio.

In France, Castellitto played the male lead opposite Jeanne Balibar in Jacques Rivette's Va savoir (2001). His most recent accomplishment as an actor has been in his role as Padre Pio: Miracle Man, arguably the defining role of his career.

The first film that he directed is Libero Burro, followed by Don't Move. He played the role of the antagonist, King Miraz, in the film The Chronicles of Narnia: Prince Caspian.

His other films as director are Twice Born, which played at the Toronto Film Festival (2012), Lucky, which played at the Cannes Film Festival, La bellezza del somaro, Nessuno si salva da solo, Il materiale emotivo.

Castellitto appeared in the television series In Treatment in the role of Giovanni.

Most recently, Castellitto portrayed the archconservative Cardinal Tedesco in Conclave, in a performance largely applauded by film critics.

Castellitto is married to Margaret Mazzantini with four children, including Pietro, an actor and film director himself. Castellitto also speaks English and French.

== Awards ==
- 1990 David di Donatello Award for Best Supporting Actor (for Tre colonne in cronaca)
- 1993 David di Donatello Award for Best Actor (for Il grande cocomero)
- 1993 Italian Golden Globe Award for Best Actor (for Il grande cocomero)
- 1995 Venice Film Festival Pasinetti Award for Best Actor (for The Star Maker)
- 1996 Italian National Syndicate of Film Journalists Silver Ribbon for Best Actor (for The Star Maker)
- 2000 Mons International Festival Grand Prize (for Libero Burro)
- 2002 European Film Award for Best Actor (for Mostly Martha)
- 2002 Flaiano Film Festival Audience Award for Best Actor (for My Mother's Smile)
- 2002 Italian Golden Globe Award for Best Actor (for My Mother's Smile)
- 2002 Italian National Syndicate of Film Journalists Silver Ribbon for Best Actor (for My Mother's Smile)
- 2002 Mons International Festival Award for Best Actor (for Mostly Martha)
- 2003 Flaiano International Prize Golden Pegasus for Best Television Actor (for Ferrari)
- 2003 Sant Jordi Award for Best Foreign Actor (for Mostly Martha, Unfair Competition, and Who Knows?)
- 2004 David di Donatello Award for Best Actor (for Don't Move)
- 2004 Flaiano Film Festival Audience Award for Best Film (for Don't Move)
- 2004 Italian Golden Globe Award for Best Film (for Don't Move)
- 2005 Italian National Syndicate of Film Journalists Silver Ribbon for Best Screenplay (for Don't Move)
- 2006 Venice Film Festival Pasinetti Award for Best Actor (for The Missing Star)
- 2007 Italian National Syndicate of Film Journalists European Silver Ribbon (for his masterclass at Cannes)
- 2009 Rome Film Fest Award for Best Actor (for Raise Your Head)
- 2020 Prix Iris for Best Supporting Actor (for Mafia Inc.)
- 2024 Screen Actors Guild Award for Outstanding Performance by a Cast in a Motion Picture (for Conclave)

== Filmography ==
=== Film ===
Key
†	Denotes films that have not yet been released

Title	Year	Role	Director	Notes
Three Brothers	1981	Terrorist	Francesco Rosi	Uncredited
Carcerato	1981	Scapriciatiello	Alfonso Brescia	
The General of the Dead Army	1983	The Expert	Luciano Tovoli	
Magic Moments	1984	Roberto	Luciano Odorisio	
Giovanni Senzapensieri	1986	Giovanni Senzapensieri	Marco Colli	
Sembra morto… ma è solo svenuto	1986	Romano Duranti	Felice Farina	
The Family	1987	Carletto	Ettore Scola	
Love and Fear	1987	Roberto Parini	Margarethe von Trotta	
The Big Blue	1988	Novelli	Luc Besson	
Little Misunderstandings	1989	Paolo	Ricky Tognazzi	
Tre colonne in cronaca	1990	Quinto Cecconi	Carlo Vanzina	
Alberto Express	1990	Alberto Capuana	Arthur Joffé	
Una fredda mattina di maggio	1990	Ruggero Manni	Vittorio Sindoni	
Stasera a casa di Alice	1990	Filippo	Carlo Verdone	
The Flesh	1991	Paolo Bellerio	Marco Ferreri	
Rossini! Rossini!	1991	Gioacchino Rossini (young)	Mario Monicelli	
Nero	1992	Federico Zardo	Giancarlo Soldi	
Nessuno	1992	Elio	Francesco Calogera	
The Great Pumpkin	1993	Arturo	Francesca Archibugi	
Toxic Affair	1993	Mister Ray-Ban	Philomène Esposito	
With Closed Eyes	1994	Alberto	Francesca Archibugi	
The Star Maker	1995	Giuseppe "Joe Morelli" Romolo	Giuseppe Tornatore	
Portrait chinois	1996	Guido	Martine Dugowson	
Hotel Paura	1996	Carlo Ruggeri	Renato De Maria	
Silenzio... si nasce	1996	Iorio "Il Forte"	Giovanni Veronesi	
Quadrille	1997	Carl Herickson	Valérie Lemercier	
For Sale	1998	Luigi Primo	Laetitia Masson	
Libero Burro	1999	Libero Burro	Sergio Castellitto	Directional debut; also co-writer
The Last Kiss	2001	Eugenio Bonetti	Gabriele Muccino	
Unfair Competition	2001	Leone Della Rocca	Ettore Scola	
Laguna	2001	Joe Sollazzo	Dennis Berry	
Va savoir	2001	Ugo	Jacques Rivette	
Mostly Martha	2001	Mario	Sandra Nettelbeck	
My Mother's Smile	2002	Ernesto Picciafuoco	Marco Bellocchio	
Caterina in the Big City	2003	Giancarlo Iacovoni	Paolo Virzì	
Ne quittez pas!	2004	Félix Mandel	Arthur Joffé	
Don't Move	2004	Timoteo	Sergio Castellitto	Also director and co-writer
The Wedding Director	2006	Franco Elica	Marco Bellocchio	
Paris, je t'aime	2006	The Husband	Isabel Coixet	Segment: "Bastille"
The Missing Star	2006	Vincenzo Buonavolontà	Gianni Amelio	
Arthur and the Minimoys	2006	Le Chef de Gare (voice)	Luc Besson	
The Chronicles of Narnia: Prince Caspian	2008	King Miraz	Andrew Adamson	
Italians	2009	Fortunato Polidori	Giovanni Veronesi	
Around a Small Mountain	2009	Vittorio	Jacques Rivette	
Bets and Wedding Dresses	2009	Franco Campanella	Vincenzo Terracciano	
Raise Your Head	2009	Antonio Mero	Alessandro Angelini	
Love & Slaps	2010	Marcello Sinibaldi	Sergio Castellitto	Also director and co-writer
Twice Born	2012	Giuliano	Sergio Castellitto	Also director and co-writer
A Perfect Family	2012	Leone	Paolo Genovese	
La buca	2014	Oscar	Daniele Ciprì	
You Can't Save Yourself Alone	2015	Alessio Righetti	Sergio Castellitto	Cameo appearance; also director
Piccoli crimini coniugali	2017	Elia	Alex Infascelli	
Fortunata	2017	Nurse	Sergio Castellitto	Cameo appearance; also director
Dreamfools	2018	Sergio	Francesco Miccichè	
Mafia Inc.	2019	Francesco "Frank" Paternò	Daniel Grou	
Nour	2019	Pietro Bartolo	Maurizio Zaccaro	
Il talento del calabrone	2020	Carlo De Mattei	Giacomo Cimini	
The Bad Poet	2020	Gabriele D'Annunzio	Gianluca Jodice	
A Bookshop in Paris	2021	Vincenzo	Sergio Castellitto	Also director and co-writer
Dante	2022	Giovanni Boccaccio	Pupi Avati	
The Best Century of My Life	2023	Gustavo Diotallevi	Alessandro Bardani	
Enea	2023	Celeste	Pietro Castellitto	
Romeo Is Juliet	2024	Federico Landi Porrini	Giovanni Veronesi	
Conclave	2024	Cardinal Goffredo Tedesco	Edward Berger	
Violette †	2026	Sasha	Jean-Pierre Jeunet	Post-production
Regina †	TBA	TBA	Sergio Castellitto	In production

=== Television ===
Title	Year	Role	Network	Notes
10 registi italiani, 10 racconti italiani	1983	Francesco Maria	Rai 3	Episode: "La singolare avventura di Francesco Maria"
Western di cose nostre	1984	Pasqualino	Rai 2	Two-parts television movie
Nontuttorosa	1987	Tazzi	Italia 1	Television movie
Piazza Navona	1988	Leo	Rai 2	Episode: "Amore a cinque stelle"
I pianoforti di Berlino	1988	Rocco	TF1	Miniseries
Un cane sciolto	1990	Judge Dario De Santis	Rai 1	Two-parts television movie
Un cane sciolto 2	1991	Judge Dario De Santis	Rai 1	Television movie
Un cane sciolto 3	1992	Judge Dario De Santis	Rai 1	Television movie
Il grande Fausto	1995	Fausto Coppi	Rai 1	Two-parts television movie
Pronto	1997	Tommy "The Zip" Bucks	Showtime	Television movie
Don Milani – Il priore di Barbiana	1997	Don Lorenzo Milani	Rai 2	Two-parts television movie
Padre Pio: Miracle Man	2000	Pio of Pietrelcina / Father Pio	Canale 5	Two-parts television movie
Ferrari	2003	Enzo Ferrari	Canale 5	Two-parts television movie
Maigret	2004	Detective Jules Maigret	Canale 5	Miniseries
Fuga per la libertà – L'aviatore	2008	Massimo Teglio	Canale 5	Television movie
'O professore	2008	Pietro Filodomini	Canale 5	Miniseries
In Treatment	2013–2017	Dr. Giovanni Mari	Sky Atlantic	Lead role; 105 episodes
Il sindaco pescatore	2016	Angelo Vassallo	Rai 1	Television movie
Rocco Chinnici	2018	Rocco Chinnici	Rai 1	Television movie
Aldo Moro – Il professore	2018	Aldo Moro	Rai 1	Television movie
Pezzi unici	2019	Vanni Bandinelli	Rai 1	Main role; 12 episodes
Natale in Casa Cupiello	2020	Luca Cupiello	Rai 1	Television movie
Crazy for Football – Matti per il calcio	2021	Saverio Lulli	Rai 1	Television movie
Sabato, domenica e lunedì	2021	Peppino Priore	Rai 1	Television movie
Non ti pago	2021	Ferdinando Quagliuolo	Rai 1	Television movie
Il nostro generale	2023	General Officer Carlo Alberto dalla Chiesa	Rai 1	Lead role; 8 episodes
My Family	2026	Gaetano	Netflix	Main role (season 2); 6 episodes
The Gentlemen	2026	Marco Moretti	Netflix	Main role (season 2); 7 episodes
In Utero	2026–present	Dr. Ruggero Gentile	HBO Max	Lead role; 8 episodes
