= Don't Move (2004 film) =

2004 Italian film

- Directed by: Sergio Castellitto
- Written by: Sergio Castellitto (story & screenplay); Margaret Mazzantini (novel, story & screenplay)
- Produced by: Marco Chimenz; Giovanni Stabilini; Riccardo Tozzi
- Starring: Penélope Cruz; Sergio Castellitto; Claudia Gerini
- Cinematography: Gianfilippo Corticelli
- Edited by: Patrizio Marone
- Music by: Lucio Godoy; Vasco Rossi
- Distributed by: Medusa Distribuzione
- Release date: 12 March 2004
- Running time: 125 minutes
- Country: Italy
- Language: Italian

Don't Move (Italian: Non ti muovere) is a 2004 Italian film directed by Sergio Castellitto. It stars Penélope Cruz, Claudia Gerini, Angela Finocchiaro and the director himself. Both Castellitto and Cruz received critical praise for their performances, as well as several awards, including the prestigious David di Donatello. It was screened in the Un Certain Regard section at the 2004 Cannes Film Festival.

== Plot ==
Timoteo, a surgeon, gets the shocking news that his fifteen-year-old daughter Angela has been seriously injured in a motorcycle accident. As she is operated upon, Timoteo looks out of a window to see (or imagines seeing) a woman, her back facing him, proceeding to sit down on a chair in the rain outside. He notices her prominent red heels and turns away in disbelief, indicating he was familiar with them. His subsequent reminiscences about an old affair comprise the remainder of the film.

A subsequent scene shows Timoteo sitting in a bar in an unfamiliar location on a hot day. Italia, a woman of Albanian origin working at the bar and wearing red heels, offers to let him make a seemingly important call from her home. The inebriated Timoteo, having entered her flat, rapes Italia and subsequently pretends to fall in love with her. He learns from her, among other things, she was sexually abused in her childhood by a dress salesman (who is later revealed to be her father). He decides to leave his wife Elsa and conveys this to Italia but, just as he is about to come clean, he discovers that Elsa is pregnant. Meanwhile, Italia also becomes pregnant with his child. Timoteo, now in a real dilemma, cannot gather the courage to confront Elsa in her condition. Italia, unaware of this, interprets Timoteo's hesitation as a lack of commitment on his part and is heartbroken by this perceived betrayal. Later, Timoteo encounters a seemingly unstable Italia dancing frenziedly outside her house. On his chiding her, Italia tells him agitatedly that she has had their child aborted at a nearby gypsy's, adding bitterly it was for the best as she would not have made a good mother anyway. Greatly disturbed by this development, Timoteo leaves and goes home to his pregnant wife.

Some months later, Timoteo, shopping with his wife who is about to deliver, spots Italia in a crowd and rushes after her in the rain. After catching up with her, he profusely apologises to Italia, asking her forgiveness for all the pain he caused. After reacting violently initially, Italia tells him that she knew now why he could not leave his wife and that she understood. He also learns from her that she would be moving to another town shortly.

Next morning, Timoteo offers to drive Italia down to her new town. During the journey, his feelings for Italia grow stronger and he confesses his desire to marry and settle down with her in the new town. While having dinner, Timoteo marries himself off to Italia and refers to her as "my wife" while speaking to a waitress. That night, he is woken by Italia's screams as she is gripped by unbearable pain in her abdomen. She is rushed to the local hospital, where an ultrasound reveals her belly to be full of blood, indicating a botched abortion. A desperate Timoteo then proceeds to operate on Italia. She dies soon after briefly regaining consciousness.

His recollections are interrupted by a nurse who informs him that his daughter's condition has stabilised. He then visits her with his wife. The lady who was shown in the beginning, sitting with her back towards Timoteo is reflected in her hand mirror. She appears to be smiling and has resemblance to Italia.

In the final act, a relieved Timoteo takes out Italia's red shoe, which she had lost on the way to the hospital the day she died, and that the funeral company had refused to put in the closed coffin, and which he had carefully preserved, and kisses it as a gesture of thanks. He takes the single shoe out of his locker room and places it on the exact spot where he had imagined seeing the woman resembling Italia, as if he is returning Italia's shoes to her.

== Cast ==
- Penélope Cruz as Italia
- Sergio Castellitto as Timoteo
- Claudia Gerini as Elsa
- Angela Finocchiaro as Ada
- Marco Giallini as Manlio
- Pietro De Silva as Alfredo
- Vittoria Piancastelli as Raffaella
- Elena Perino as Angela
- Renato Marchetti as Pino
- Gianni Musy as Padre di Elsa
- Paola Cerimele as nurse Molise
- Giorgio Careccia as skinny guy
- Flavio Brunetti as Becchino

== Reception ==
Penélope Cruz, who learned Italian for the role, earned critical acclaim for her performance and won the David di Donatello. She was also awarded the European Film Award for the Best Actress for the film in 2004.
