= Carlo Mazzantini =

Italian writer

Carlo Mazzantini (1925–2006) was an Italian writer. He published a number of books; among the best-known is A cercar la bella morte, which was translated by Simonetta Wenkert into English and published under the title In Search of a Glorious Death.

== Life ==
He was born in Rome, and fought in the Second World War. After the war, he lived in Morocco and Ireland, where he worked as a teacher in Tangier and Galway respectively.

In 1957 he married the Irish painter Anne Donnelly, with whom he had four daughters including the writer Margaret Mazzantini and the actress Giselda Volodi. He died in Tivoli.
