= Margaret Mazzantini =

Italian-Irish writer and actress (born 1961)

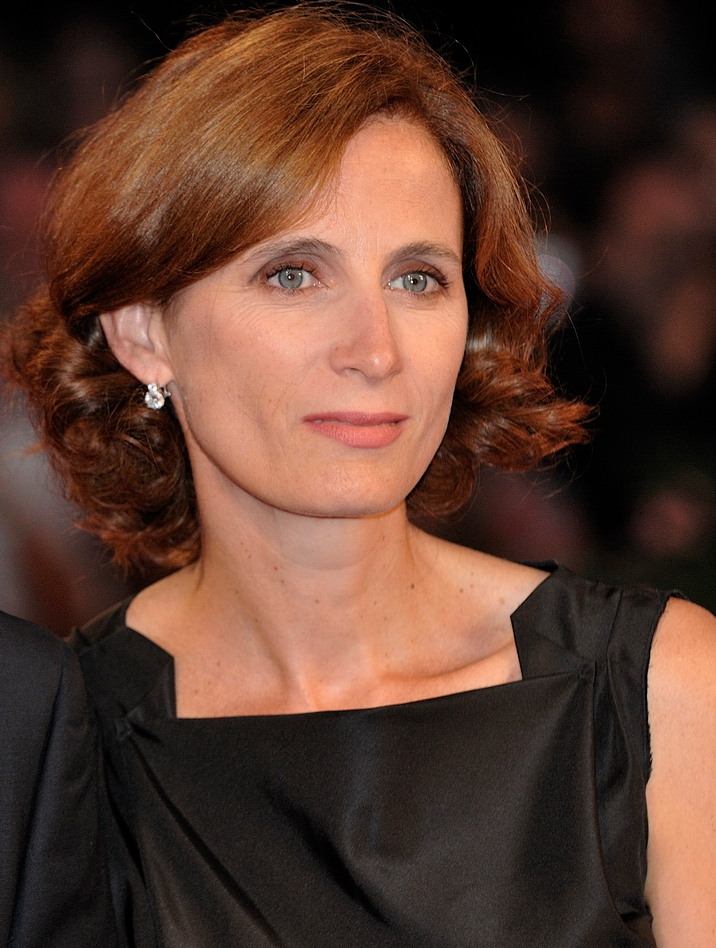
- Born: 27 October 1961 (age 64); Dublin, Ireland
- Other name: Margaret Donnelly
- Citizenship: Italy; Ireland
- Occupations: Writer; actress
- Years active: 1980–present
- Spouse: Sergio Castellitto (m. 1987)
- Children: 4, including Pietro Castellitto
- Parents: Carlo Mazzantini (father); Anne Donnelly (mother)
- Relatives: Giselda Volodi (sister)
- Website: www.margaretmazzantini.com

Margaret Mazzantini (Italian pronunciation: [ˈmarɡaret mattsanˈtiːni]; born 27 October 1961) is an Italian-Irish writer and actress. She became a film, television and stage actor, but is best known as a writer. Mazzantini began her acting career in 1980, starring in the cult horror classic Antropophagus. She has also appeared on television and in the theatre. As a successful writer, her novels include Non ti muovere (Don't Move), which was adapted into the namesake film and is directed by her husband Sergio Castellitto and stars Penélope Cruz. Her career as a writer and actress has earned her several awards and nominations, including Campiello Awards, a Golden Ticket Award, and a Goya Award.

== Early life ==
Mazzantini was born in Dublin, Ireland to Carlo Mazzantini, an Italian writer and artist, and Anne Donnelly, an Irish artist. She has three sisters (one of whom is Giselda Volodi). She spent her childhood around Europe, Spain, and Tangier, until the family settled in Tivoli. In 1982, she graduated from the Academy of Dramatic Arts in Rome.

== Personal life ==
She married Sergio Castellitto in 1987. They have four children, Pietro (b. 1991), Maria (b. 1997), Anna (b. 2001) and Cesare (b. 2006). She lives in Rome.

In 2003, she was awarded the title of Knight of the Order of Merit of the Italian Republic on the initiative of the President of the Republic.

== Filmography ==
Film
Year	Title	Role	Notes
1980	Antropophagus	Henriette 'Rita'	Credited as Margaret Donnelly
1982	La Voce		English: The Voice
1988	Nulla ci può fermare		
1988	Il cuore di mamma	Valeria	
1989	L'assassina		
1994	Quando le montagne finiscono	Anna	
1996	Festival	Carla Melis	
1996	The Barber of Rio	Silvia	
1997	Il cielo è sempre più blu		
1999	Libero Burro	Caterina Clavarino	
2004	Non ti muovere	Ultima donna di questa storia	Uncredited; also writer, English: Don't Move
Television
Year	Title	Role	Notes
1984	Un caso d'incoscienza	Helga	Television film
1984	Un delitto		Television film
1987	Il commissario corso		Mini-series; episode: Senza Prove
1988	Lucas läβt grüβen		Television film
1988	Chéri		Television film
1990	Una fredda mattina di maggio	Lia	Television film
1991	Un cane sciolto 2		Television film
1991	Duel of Hearts	Zara	Television film
1991	Le flic de Moscou	Virginie	2 episodes: Meurtre au monastère, Crime sous hypnose
Writer
Year	Title	Notes	
1993	Libero Burro		
2004	Non ti muovere		

== Theatre ==
- 1982: Ifigenia di Goethe
- 1983-1983: Venezia salvata di T.
- 1984-1985: La tre sorelle di Cechov (The Three Sisters of Cechov)
- 1984-1985: L'onesto Jago di C.
- 1984-1985: L'Alcade di Zalamea di Calderon de la Barca (The Governor of Zalamea Calderon de la Barca)
- 1985-1986: La Signora Giulia di Strindberg
- 1986: Antigone di Sofocle
- 1987: Faust di Goethe
- 1987: Mon Faust di Paul Valéry
- 1988: Bambino di Susan Sontag (Child of Susan Sontag)
- 1989: Praga Magica-Valeria (Magic Prague-Valeria)
- 1992-1993: A piedi nudi nel parco (Barefoot in the Park)
- 1994: Colpi bassi (Low Blows)

== Works ==
- Il Catino Di Zinco, Venezia : Marsilio Editori, 1994. ISBN 88-317-5897-7
- Manola, Milano : Mondadori, 1998. ISBN 88-04-41016-7
- Non ti muovere, Milano : Mondadori, 2001. ISBN 88-04-48947-2
  - translated into English by John Cullen Don't move, London : Chatto & Windus, 2004. ISBN 0-7011-7677-6
  - adapted as the film Non ti muovere (Don't Move), directed by Sergio Castellitto, released 2004
- Zorro. Un eremita sul marciapiede, Milano : Mondadori, 2004. ISBN 88-04-53516-4
- Venuto al mondo, Mondadori, Milano 2008. ISBN 88-04-57370-8
  - translated into English by Ann Gagliardi Twice Born, Oxford : Oneworld, 2011. ISBN 1-85168-844-7
  - adapted as the film Venuto al mondo, directed by Sergio Castellitto, released 2012
- Nessuno si salva da solo, Milano : Mondadori, 2011, ISBN 978-88-046-0865-3
- Mare al mattino, Turino: Einaudi, 2011 ISBN 978-88-062-1113-4
- Splendore, Milano, Mondadori, 2013. ISBN 978-88-04-63808-7

== Awards and nominations ==
- 1984: UBU Award - Best Young Actress
- 1985: Golden Mask IDI
- 1994: Golden Ticket Award
- 1994: Rapallo Carige Prize
- 1994: Campiello Prize Selection
- 2002: Rapallo Carige Prize
- 2002: Premio Strega
- 2002: Grinzane Cavour Prize
- 2002: Bari Award
- 2004: Boccaccio Prize
- 2005: Silver Ribbon - Best Screenplay (for Don't Move shared with Sergio Castellitto)
- 2009: Campiello Prize - for Come to the World
- 2004: Nomination - David Award - Best Screenplay (for Don't Move shared with Sergio Castellitto)
- 2005: Nomination - CEC Award - Best Screenplay, adapted (for Don't Move shared with Sergio Castellitto)
- 2005: Nomination - Goya Award - Best Screenplay, adapted (for Don't Move shared with Sergio Castellitto)
