= Giselda Volodi =

Italian actress

Giselda Volodi (born 1959) is an Italian actress. She was born Giselda Mazzantini, in Tangier, Morocco, to the family of writer Carlo Mazzantini and artist Anne Donnelly. She is the sister of writer/actress Margaret Mazzantini and producer Moira Mazzantini. She made her film debut in Hudson Hawk. Other roles since then include Ocean's Twelve, The Grand Budapest Hotel and A Brief Affair.
