= Walter Fasano =

Italian film editor

- Born: 10 April 1970 (age 56); Bari, Apulia, Italy
- Occupation: Film editor
- Years active: 1995–present

Walter Fasano (born 10 April 1970) is an Italian film editor. Best known for his collaborations with director Luca Guadagnino, he rose to prominence for his work on the universally-acclaimed film Call Me by Your Name (2017), for which he received many awards and nominations.

== Filmography ==
=== Feature films ===
- Cambio di mano (1996)
- Romantico (1997)
- Blood Is Not Fresh Water (1997; documentary)
- Sorrisi asmatici, parte terza (1997)
- Satelliti (1997)
- The Protagonists (1999) – also first assistant director
- 16 45 (1999)
- Vai bello (1999)
- A Deadly Compromise (2000)
- Santa Maradona (2001)
- 500! (2001)
- Giorni (2001)
- Dérive Gallizio (2001; documentary)
- Mundo civilizado (2003; documentary)
- Past Perfect (2003)
- Now or Never (2003)
- The Card Player (2004)
- Roundtrip (2004)
- Melissa P. (2005)
- 4-4-2 - Il gioco più bello del mondo (2006)
- The Mother of Tears (2007) – also screenwriter
- Hermano (2007)
- Il confine (2007; documentary)
- The Man Who Loves (2008)
- I Am Love (2009) – also screenwriter and writer for soundtrack (5 tracks)
- Unlikely Revolutionaries (2010)
- Ritratto di mio padre (2010; documentary)
- One Day More (2011)
- The Perfect Life (2011)
- Magnificent Presence (2012)
- The Landlords (2012)
- A Five Star Life (2013)
- Bertolucci on Bertolucci (2013; documentary) – also co-director
- L'arbitro (2013)
- Bota (2014)
- A Bigger Splash (2015) – also writer for soundtrack (1 track)
- Antonia. (2015)
- Me, Myself and Her (2015)
- La prima volta (di mia figlia) (2015)
- Call Me by Your Name (2017) – also music editor
- Never Here (2017)
- Suspiria (2018)
- Ovunque proteggimi (2018)
- Respiri (2018)
- 5 Is the Perfect Number (2019)
- America Latina (2021)
- Beckett (2021)

=== Television ===
- Do You Like Hitchcock? (2005; television film)
- Il vizio dell'amore (2006; TV series)

=== Short films ===
- L'ultimo uomo (1995)
- Assunta (1995) – also assistant director
- Nastassia (1996)
- Qui (1997)
- Senza piombo (1997)
- La tua lingua sul mio cuore (1999) – also assistant director
- L'uomo risacca (2000)
- Quando si chiudono gli occhi (2000)
- Amateurs 2 (2000)
- Blue Haven (2001)
- Delfinasia (2007)
- Unione europea (2007)
- Diarchia (2010)
- L'Ora (2011)
- La cosa in cima alle scale (2011)
- Destinée (2012)
- L'inganno (2013)
- Io non ti conosco (2013)
- A Rose Reborn (2014)
- The Millionaires (2016)
- Await (2016)
- Closing In (2017)
- The Staggering Girl (2019)

== Awards and nominations ==
- 2017: Nominated— Film Independent Spirit Awards: Best Editing - Call Me by Your Name
- 2017: Silver Ribbon
