= Paz! =

- Directed by: Renato De Maria
- Starring: Claudio Santamaria; Flavio Pistilli; Max Mazzotta; Fabrizia Sacchi
- Cinematography: Gian Filippo Corticelli
- Music by: Riccardo Sinigallia; Francesco Zampaglione; Meme
- Release date: 2002
- Language: Italian

Paz! is a 2002 Italian dark comedy film written and directed by Renato De Maria. Set in 1977 in Bologna, it is based on several comic characters created by Andrea Pazienza.

== Cast ==
- Claudio Santamaria as Pentothal
- Flavio Pistilli as Massimo Zanardi
- Matteo Taranto as Roberto Colasanti
- Max Mazzotta as Enrico Fiabeschi
- Rosalinda Celentano as Gianna
- Fabrizia Sacchi as Lucilla
- Iaia Forte as Prof. Corona
- Cristiano Callegaro as Sergio Petrilli
- Roberto Citran as a professor
- Giampaolo Morelli as Massimone
- Vittoria Puccini as Mirella
- Antonio Rezza as Sprite
- Frankie hi-nrg MC as the gangster
- Ricky Memphis as the guy from Latina
- Giorgio Tirabassi as Freak
- Freak Antoni as the janitor
- Giovanni Lindo Ferretti as the shadow man
