= Alessia Barela =

Italian actress

Alessia Barela (born 13 June 1974) is an Italian actress. Her credits include the television series Carlo & Malik, Tutti pazzi per amore and Inspector Rex and the films Past Perfect, Summer Games and Maximum Velocity (V-Max).

== Early life and career ==
Barela was born in Chieti in southern Italy to a Spanish father and an Italian mother and grew up between Salerno and Madrid.

She attended a liceo linguistico high school in Rome with a focus on theater and entertainment. She studied acting with Marisa Fabbri and Carlo Merlo and, for two years, at a school operated by Beatrice Bracco and Francesca De Sapio. Later, she had an internship with Dominique De Fazio and attended the theater school at the MTM (Manifatture Teatrali Milanesi). She also took singing lessons from tenor Gianluca Terranova.

Barela found early work in small theaters in and about Rome, making her TV debut in 1999 in the TV miniseries All men are equal (Tutti gli uomini sono uguali) and her film debut in 1998 in A Year in the Country (Un anno in campagna).

== Selected filmography ==
- Un anno in campagna (1998)
- Lucignolo (1999)
- Zora the Vampire (1999)
- Maximum Velocity (V-Max) (2001)
- Past Perfect (2002)
- People of Rome (2003)
- Feisbum - Il film (2009)
- Eighteen: The World at My Feet (2010)
- Summer Games (2011)
- Fallo per papà (2012)
- Il venditore di medicine (2012)
- A Five Star Life (2013)
- Il Natale della mamma imperfetta (2013)
- Blame Freud (2014)
- Me, Myself and Her (2015)
- Il ministro (2015)
- Seven Days (2016)
- Alice non lo sa (2017)
- C'è un posto nel mondo (2024)
- Love in Separate Beds (2025)
