= Blood Is Not Fresh Water =

- Directed by: Theo Eshetu
- Produced by: Eve Silvester
- Edited by: Walter Fasano
- Release date: 1997
- Running time: 57 minutes
- Country: Ethiopia

Blood is Not Fresh Water, also known as Il Sangue Non E Acqua Fresca, is an Ethiopian film, made in 1997 and directed by Theo Eshetu.

The film has been called Eshetu's seminal work.

== Synopsis ==
In the film Eshetu traces his family to Ethiopia, where his grandfather lives and which the director uses to discuss Italian colonialism.

== Release ==
The film was originally released in 1997 and since its release, has been curated by African Film Festival, Inc., which screened it at their 2000 film festival. Blood is Not Fresh Water was additionally screened at the Wolfsonian-FIU in 2007 and at the Miami Art Central in 2006.

== Reception ==
Blood is Not Fresh Water has received a positive reception and is considered by Selene Wendt to be Exhetu's seminal work. Stuart Klawans wrote favorably about the movie in The Nation, calling it one of the most absorbing films of the 2000 African Film Festival and that it was "a wryly impressionistic travelogue". Per Mbye B. Cham, the film "uses the filmmaker’s grandfather, Tekle Tsadik Mekouria, a historian in his own right, as the principal narrative vehicle for re-telling the story of Ethiopia across broad time spans, events and achievements. An impressive mosaic of images, archival footage, personal testimonies and humor is mobilized with great skill and imagination to speak about Ethiopia of Solomonic origins, her ancient and proud heritage of culture, religion and art, and the experiences with Italian fascist invasion in 1936, seemingly to avenge their defeat half a century earlier in 1896 at the Battle of Adwa. "
