= The Protagonists (1999 film) =

Film by Luca Guadagnino

- Theatrical release poster
- Directed by: Luca Guadagnino
- Written by: Luca Guadagnino
- Produced by: Fulvio Colombo; Massimo Vigliar
- Starring: Tilda Swinton; Fabrizia Sacchi
- Cinematography: Paolo Bravi
- Edited by: Walter Fasano
- Music by: Andrea Guerra
- Production companies: Surf Film; Medusa Film; Tele+
- Distributed by: Medusa Distribuzione
- Release dates: 8 September 1999 (Venice); 10 September 1999 (Italy)
- Running time: 87 minutes
- Country: Italy
- Languages: English; Italian

The Protagonists is a 1999 Italian crime thriller film written and directed by Luca Guadagnino in his directorial debut. It stars Tilda Swinton and Fabrizia Sacchi.

The film had its world premiere at the 56th Venice International Film Festival on 8 September 1999. It was released in Italy on 10 September 1999 by Medusa Distribuzione.

== Premise ==
The film chronicles an Italian film crew who are in London making a reconstruction of the real-life killing of Egyptian chef Mohamed El-Sayed by the two 19-year-olds Jamie Petrolini and Richard Elsey in 1994.

== Cast ==
- Tilda Swinton as Actress
- Fabrizia Sacchi as herself
- Andrew Tiernan as Mohammed
- Claudio Gioè as Happy
- Paolo Briguglia as Billy
- Michelle Hunziker as Sue
- Jhelisa as herself
- Laura Betti as Judge

== Production ==
Production on the film began in 1998, with principal photography taking place in London.

== Release ==
The Protagonists had its world premiere at the 56th Venice International Film Festival on 8 September 1999. The film was released in Italy on 10 September 1999 by Medusa Distribuzione.

It was released in the United Kingdom on DVD on 13 October 2014 by Argent Films.

=== Critical reception ===
The film received negative reviews from Italian critics.
