= Fabrizia Sacchi =

Italian actress

Fabrizia Sacchi (born 10 February 1971) is an Italian actress.

Sacchi was born in Naples.

She's best known for her role in Maria Sole Tognazzi's comedy-drama film A Five Star Life (2013) for which she was nominated to David di Donatello for Best Supporting Actress. Her other notable film credits include the LGBT-themed comedy Men Men Men (1995), the thriller The Protagonists (1999), the French drama I Prefer the Sound of the Sea (2000), the comedy Paz! (2002), the Luca Guadagnino's erotic drama Melissa P. (2005), the horror film Suspiria (2018) and the biographical drama The Great Ambition (2024). On television, she's best known for playing Gabriella Boschi in Rai 1 medical drama series Medicina generale (2007–2010) and Lidia Sarratore in the HBO and RAI drama series My Brilliant Friend (2018–2024).

== Filmography ==
Film
Year	Title	Role	Notes
1990	Traces of an Amorous Life	Beatrice	
1992	Nessuno	Nora	
1992	Nel continente nero	Federica	
1995	Men Men Men	Anna Farnesi	
1996	Isotta	Anna	
1999	Outlaw	Teresa	
1999	The Protagonists	Herself	
1999	Piccole cose di valore non quantificabile	Francesca	Short film
1999	Il guerriero Camillo	Maria	
2000	I Prefer the Sound of the Sea	Serena	
2000	Tandem	Blanda Tozzi	
2001	Rabid Dogs	Mrs. Giannotto	Cameo appearance; re-issued version of the 1974 film
2001	Jurij	Isabella	
2001	Come si fa un Martini	Rita	
2002	Da zero a dieci	Lara	
2002	Paz!	Lucilla	
2003	Happiness Costs Nothing	Claudia	
2005	Cielo e terra	Lea	
2005	Apnea	Monica	
2005	Melissa P.	Daria	
2007	Part deux	Mother	Short film
2009	Feisbum: The Movie	Gavino's Wife	Segment: "Indian Dream"
2010	The First Beautiful Thing	Sandra	
2011	Questo mondo è per te	Carlotta	
2013	A Five Star Life	Silvia	
2013	Stay Away from Me	Simona	
2015	La prima volta (di mia figlia)	Marina	
2018	Zen sul ghiaccio sottile	Sandra	
2018	Noi soli	Agnese	Short film
2018	Suspiria	Pavia	
2019	Domani è un altro giorno	Gloria	
2019	The Staggering Girl	Dancing Woman	Short film
2020	Maledetta primavera	Nadia	
2023	Fireworks	Carmela	
2024	The Great Ambition	Nilde Iotti	
2024	C'è un posto nel mondo	Laura	
2025	Primavera	Priora	

Television
Year	Title	Role	Notes
1997	L'avvocato delle donne	Cinzia	Episode: "Cinzia"
1997	Un giorno fortunato	Laura	Television movie
2001	La Sindone - 24 ore, 14 ostaggi	Laura	Television movie
2003	Ultima pallottola	Prosecutor Landolfi	Two-part television movie
2007–2010	Medicina generale	Gabriella Boschi	Main role
2009	Tutta la verità	Benedetta Amodio	Television movie
2011	Fuoriclasse	Nadia Mittolò	Main role (season 1)
2015	1992	Marina	3 episodes
2016	Braccialetti rossi	Cris Mother	2 episodes
2017	Sirene	Silvia De Angelis	Main role
2018	Thou Shalt Not Kill	Bianca Giordano	Episode: "Episodio 17"
2018–2024	My Brilliant Friend	Lidia Sarratore	Recurring role; 5 episodes
2019	Pezzi unici	Chiara Fanti	Main role
2019, 2021	Rocco Schiavone	Oriana Berardi	3 episodes
2021–present	Inspector Ricciardi	Lucia Caputo	Main role
2021	Luna Park	Lucia Gabrielli	Main role
2021	Sabato, domenica e lunedì	Rosa Piscopo	Television movie
2024	Deceitful Love	Delia	Main role
