= Past Perfect (2003 film) =

2003 film

- Film poster
- Directed by: Maria Sole Tognazzi
- Written by: Daniele Prato
- Starring: Valentina Cervi; Paola Cortellesi; Claudio Gioè; Ignazio Oliva; Claudio Santamaria
- Cinematography: Giulio Pietromarchi
- Edited by: Walter Fasano
- Music by: Andrea Guerra
- Release date: 28 March 2003
- Running time: 97 minutes
- Country: Italy
- Language: Italian

Past Perfect (Italian: Passato prossimo) is a 2003 Italian comedy film directed by Maria Sole Tognazzi. It was entered into the 25th Moscow International Film Festival.

== Synopsis ==
It is a film in regard to some Italian friends who are having romantic feelings for each other. There are many love triangles involved.

== Cast ==
- Valentina Cervi as Carola Baiardo
- Paola Cortellesi as Claudia
- Claudio Gioè as Giammaria
- Ignazio Oliva as Edoardo Stella
- Claudio Santamaria as Andrea
- Alessia Barela as Monica
- Francesca Figus as Francesca
- Francine Berting as Elisa - Edoardo's Fiancée (as Francina Berting)
- Francesca Borelli as Carola's Friend (as Francesca Haydèe Borelli)
- Giorgio Colangeli as Traffic Policeman
- Stefano Venturi as Vittorio Badaloni - the Assistant Director
- Pierfrancesco Favino as Filippo
- Gianmarco Tognazzi as Alberto
