= Melissa P. (film) =

2005 film by Luca Guadagnino

- Italian theatrical release poster
- Directed by: Luca Guadagnino
- Screenplay by: Barbara Alberti; Cristiana Farina; Luca Guadagnino
- Story by: Luca Guadagnino; Christiana Farina
- Based on: 100 colpi di spazzola prima di andare a dormire by Melissa Panarello
- Produced by: Francesca Neri; Claudio Amendola; José Ibáñez
- Starring: María Valverde; Fabrizia Sacchi; Primo Reggiani; Nilo Mur; Elio Germano; Letizia Ciampa; Davide Pasti; Alba Rohrwacher; Piergiorgio Bellocchio; Giulio Berruti; Marcello Mazzarella; Claudio Santamaria; Geraldine Chaplin
- Cinematography: Mario Amura
- Edited by: Walter Fasano
- Music by: Lucio Godoy
- Production companies: Bess Movie; Pentagrama Films
- Distributed by: Columbia Pictures (though Sony Pictures Releasing International)
- Release dates: 18 November 2005 (Italy); 24 February 2006 (Spain)
- Running time: 100 minutes
- Countries: Italy; Spain
- Language: Italian
- Box office: $7.4 million

Melissa P. is a 2005 Italian-language erotic drama film, co-written and directed by Luca Guadagnino, based on the 2003 semi-autobiographical novel 100 Strokes of the Brush Before Bed by Melissa Panarello. The film stars María Valverde, Fabrizia Sacchi, Primo Reggiani, Nilo Mur, Elio Germano, Letizia Ciampa, Davide Pasti, Alba Rohrwacher, Piergiorgio Bellocchio, Giulio Berruti, Marcello Mazzarella, Claudio Santamaria, and Geraldine Chaplin.

Distributed by Columbia Pictures, Melissa P. was released in Italy on 18 November 2005 and in Spain on 24 February 2006. It placed at number one at the box office in Italy.

== Plot ==
Melissa is a shy 15-year-old girl who lives with her mother Daria and her heavy-smoking grandmother Elvira, while her father is overseas working on an oil rig. She has a close relationship with her grandmother, but feels increasingly distant from her mother. On a summer afternoon, Melissa and her best friend Manuela attend a pool party at the home of Daniele, a wealthy, attractive classmate, on whom Melissa has a crush. Daniele takes Melissa to a secluded spot, where they talk for a while before he has her perform oral sex on him. Despite the less-than-romantic encounter, Melissa's feelings for Daniele only intensify.

After failed attempts to attract Daniele's attention, Melissa goes to a bar where he is with his friends. Daniele then takes Melissa to his place and she loses her virginity to him. She tells him she loves him, but he coldly rejects her. Humiliated, Melissa vows to never let anyone hurt her again and to only think of her own pleasure.

Melissa's parents decide to send Elvira off to a nursing home due to her heart condition, which further drives a wedge between Melissa and her mother. When Elvira comes home for Christmas, she senses that Melissa is going through a difficult time and tries to alert Daria, who remains completely unaware.

One day, Melissa receives a phone call from Daniele, who says he has a surprise and asks her to come over to his place. There, Daniele and his friend Arnaldo goad her into a threesome. Though initially reluctant, Melissa decides to take control of the situation and explore her sexuality. At school, Melissa's diary—in which she details her sexual encounters—falls into the hands of a classmate, who mockingly reads it out loud to other students, including Manuela. Melissa blames Manuela for it and the two have a falling-out.

Arnaldo calls Melissa asking her to meet him. He takes her to an underground basement, where he blindfolds her and has her perform oral sex on him and four other young men. When Daria comes home, she is worried to find that Melissa is not home. She goes into Melissa's room and finds her diary, shocked at its contents. While unsuccessfully trying to call Melissa, Daria goes to the nursing home to see Elvira, but is soon notified of her death.

Meanwhile, Melissa goes to the apartment of an older man she met on a chat room, who takes pleasure in being whipped. However, he soon becomes violent as he starts whipping Melissa, scaring her. She manages to flee and rushes over to the nursing home. When confronted by her mother about her diary, Melissa confirms that the things she wrote in it are true. The two share a tearful embrace, as Daria apologises for being so oblivious.

On the last day of school, Melissa and Manuela rekindle their friendship. Arnaldo confronts Daniele about having sex with his girlfriend, slapping him in the face. A shy, eccentric student named Marco, who has long had a crush on Melissa, finally musters up the courage to approach her. He says he will be transferring to an art school, showing her a notebook with sketches he has made of her. He draws one last sketch of her before they kiss each other on the cheek. After Marco leaves, Daniele invites Melissa to a party at his place that night; she reluctantly accepts. At the party, Melissa jumps off a cliff into the sea as Manuela, Daniele and other partygoers look on in awe. She then emerges to the surface with a smile on her face.

Melissa and her mother bring flowers to Elvira's grave, and the two joyfully hug each other.

== Cast ==
- María Valverde as Melissa
- Fabrizia Sacchi as Daria
- Geraldine Chaplin as Nonna Elvira
- Letizia Ciampa as Manuela
- Primo Reggiani as Daniele
- Elio Germano as Arnaldo
- Giulio Berruti as Roberto
- Alba Rohrwacher as Clelia
- Davide Pasti as Leo
- Nilo Mur as Marco
- Piergiorgio Bellocchio as swimming instructor
- Claudio Santamaria as museum custodian
- Marcello Mazzarella as Chiunque

== Release ==
The film was released by Columbia Pictures in Italy on 18 November 2005 and in Spain on 24 February 2006.

== See also ==
- List of Italian films of 2005
- List of Spanish films of 2006
