= Suspiria (2018 film) =

Film by Luca Guadagnino

- Theatrical release poster
- Directed by: Luca Guadagnino
- Screenplay by: David Kajganich
- Based on: Suspiria by: Dario Argento; Daria Nicolodi
- Produced by: Marco Morabito; Bradley J. Fischer; Luca Guadagnino; David Kajganich; Silvia Venturini Fendi; Francesco Melzi d'Eril; William Sherak; Gabriele Moratti
- Starring: Dakota Johnson; Tilda Swinton; Mia Goth; Angela Winkler; Ingrid Caven; Elena Fokina; Sylvie Testud; Renée Soutendijk; Christine LeBoutte; Fabrizia Sacchi; Małgosia Bela; Jessica Harper; Chloë Grace Moretz
- Cinematography: Sayombhu Mukdeeprom
- Edited by: Walter Fasano
- Music by: Thom Yorke
- Production companies: K Period Media; Frenesy Film Company; Videa; Mythology Entertainment; First Sun; MeMo Films
- Distributed by: Amazon Studios (United States); Videa (Italy)
- Release dates: September 1, 2018 (Venice); October 26, 2018 (United States); January 1, 2019 (Italy)
- Running time: 152 minutes
- Countries: Italy; United States
- Languages: English; German
- Budget: $20 million
- Box office: $8 million

Suspiria is a 2018 supernatural horror film directed by Luca Guadagnino from a screenplay by David Kajganich, inspired by Dario Argento's 1977 Italian film of the same name. It stars Dakota Johnson as an American woman who enrolls at a prestigious dance academy in Berlin run by a coven of witches. Tilda Swinton co-stars in three roles, as the company's lead choreographer, as a male psychotherapist involved in the academy, and as the leader of the coven. Mia Goth, Elena Fokina and Chloë Grace Moretz appear in supporting roles as students, while Angela Winkler, Ingrid Caven, Sylvie Testud, Renée Soutendijk and Christine LeBoutte portray some of the academy's matrons. Jessica Harper, star of the original film, has a cameo appearance.

A remake of Suspiria was first announced in 2008 after Guadagnino had acquired the rights from the original film's writers, Argento and Daria Nicolodi. In September 2015, Guadagnino confirmed his plans to direct, describing his version as an "homage" to the original rather than a straightforward remake. A new screenplay was drafted by Kajganich, who had written Guadagnino's A Bigger Splash the year before. Kajganich set the film during the so-called "German Autumn" of 1977 to explore themes of generational guilt in that country during the Cold War. The film's other themes include motherhood, evil and the dynamics of matriarchies.

Unlike the original film, which used exaggerated colors, Guadagnino conceived the visuals in Suspiria as "winterish" and bleak, absent of primary colors. The film incorporates stylized dance sequences choreographed by Damien Jalet, which form part of its representation of witchcraft. Principal photography took place in late 2016 and early 2017 in Varese, Italy, and in Berlin. The musical score was composed by Radiohead singer Thom Yorke, who took inspiration from krautrock. The film is dedicated to the memories of Vogue Italia editor-in-chief Franca Sozzani, film director Jonathan Demme and Deborah Falzone.

Suspiria premiered at the 75th Venice International Film Festival on September 1, 2018. It was given a limited release by Amazon Studios in Los Angeles and New York on October 26, 2018, where it grossed over $180,000 in its opening weekend, marking the highest screen-average box-office launch of the year. It was screened on October 31 in some US cities before opening in wide release on November 2, 2018. It was released in Italy on January 1, 2019.

The film was a box-office bomb and critical response was polarized; some praised the film for its visual elements and performances, while others criticized its historical-political setting as arbitrary in relation to its other themes.

== Plot ==
During the German Autumn of 1977, Susanna "Susie" Bannion, an American from a Mennonite family in Ohio, is admitted at the Markos Dance Academy in West Berlin. A Markos student, Patricia Hingle, recently disappeared after telling her psychotherapist, Josef Klemperer, that the academy is controlled by a coven of witches. Journals left by Patricia in Klemperer's office detail The Three Mothers, a trio of witches who predate Christianity: Mater Suspiriorum, Mater Tenebrarum and Mater Lachrymarum. Klemperer, initially dismissive of Patricia's claims, becomes suspicious of the academy after her disappearance.

During rehearsal, Soviet student Olga becomes indignant towards Madame Blanc and storms out. Olga attempts to escape with her belongings but finds herself trapped alone in a room lined with mirrors. Blanc, meanwhile, resumes the rehearsal, during which Susie performs an aggressive dance; her movements begin physically afflicting Olga, ravaging her body and damaging her organs and bones. Several of the academy's matrons drag Olga's mangled body away with large hooks. Later, the matrons hold an informal election to vote for the coven's new leader. The vote is between Blanc and Mother Markos, an aged and grossly disfigured witch who has long controlled the coven, and for whom the academy is named; Markos wins the popular vote. Afterwards, Miss Griffith, the most sheepish of the matrons, kills herself.

Susie and her classmate Sara investigate the disappearances of Olga and Patricia, and realize the academy has washed all traces of them. Susie quickly climbs the ranks as Blanc's protégée and is appointed the lead of the academy's upcoming piece, Volk. Meanwhile, Sara grows suspicious of the matrons after a meeting with Klemperer and uncovers clandestine hallways in the building containing esoteric relics. Klemperer attends the performance. Immediately prior, Sara explores a passageway leading into the catacombs where she finds a heavily withering Patricia. Sara flees but the matrons manifest holes in the floor, causing her to fall and fracture her leg. Sara emerges midway through the performance, dancing her part in a hypnotic trance, but collapses in pain before the dance ends. Blanc subsequently chastises Susie for intervening in the matrons' efforts to manipulate Sara's body.

The next day, Susie attends a celebratory dinner with the matrons. Meanwhile, Klemperer encounters Anke, his presumed-deceased wife, at his dacha in East Germany. She reveals she faked her death after fleeing the Nazis and started a new life in England. They walk together, passing through a security checkpoint into West Berlin without being noticed. Klemperer realizes they have arrived at the Markos Academy and that Anke is, in fact, Miss Huller, one of the matrons, and that he has been lured there to bear witness to an impending witches' sabbath.

After the dinner, Susie returns to the academy and is led to a chamber where Blanc and the other matrons await with Mother Markos, for whom Susie is to be a new vessel, and an incapacitated Klemperer. Susie renounces her own mother, who simultaneously dies in Ohio. The matrons disembowel Sara to begin the sabbath, but Blanc senses a discrepancy. Hesitant to proceed, she is nearly decapitated by Markos. As Blanc bleeds profusely, Susie reveals that she, not Markos, is Mother Suspiriorum; she is there to claim the academy and eradicate Markos. Susie summons Death, killing Markos and her most faithful matrons, sparing only those devoted to Blanc. Patricia, Olga, and Sara, each physically ravaged, plead to die, which Susie grants them.

The following day, the academy resumes operations as usual. Miss Vendegast discovers Blanc on the verge of death, and an announcement is made to the students that Blanc has left the academy. Susie meets Klemperer, who was spared and is now confined to his bed, at his home. She apologizes for her coven's actions and recounts to him the fate of Anke, who died at the Theresienstadt concentration camp. After she touches him, he suffers a violent seizure that erases his memories before she leaves. In the present day, a carving of Klemperer and Anke's initials on the wall of their dacha goes unnoticed by its current occupants. In a post-credits scene, Susie stares approvingly at something outside the academy.

== Cast ==
- Dakota Johnson as Susanna "Susie" Bannion/Mother Suspiriorum
- Tilda Swinton as Madame Blanc/Mother Helena Markos/Dr. Josef Klemperer
- Mia Goth as Sara Simms
- Angela Winkler as Miss Tanner
- Ingrid Caven as Miss Vendegast
- Elena Fokina as Olga Ivanova
- Chloë Grace Moretz as Patricia "Pat" Hingle
- Sylvie Testud as Miss Griffith
- Renée Soutendijk as Miss Huller
- Christine LeBoutte as Miss Balfour
- Małgosia Bela as Mrs. Bannion/Death
- Jessica Harper as Anke Meier
- Fabrizia Sacchi as Pavla
- Jessica Batut as Miss Mandel
- Alek Wek as Miss Millius
- Vincenza Modica as Miss Marks
- Vanda Capriolo as Alberta
- Brigitte Cuvelier as Miss Kaplitt
- Gala Moody as Caroline
- Anne-Lise Brevers as Sonia
- Sara Sguotti as Doll
- Halla Thordardottir as Mascia
- Olivia Ancona as Marketa
- Clementine Houdart as Miss Boutaher
- Doris Hick as Frau Sesame
- Mikael Olsson as Agent Glockner
- Fred Kelemen as Agent Albrecht

== Analysis and themes ==
=== Motherhood ===
The theme of motherhood is explored frequently in the film, both within the coven and in Susie's early life and relationship to her own mother. Michael Leader of Sight & Sound considers the film "an extended exercise in metafictional annotation that insists on dragging the original's darkest metaphors into the light."

Michael O'Sullivan of The Washington Post links the film's theme of motherhood (characterized alongside its "discontents" as being "chewed on like a vulture tearing at a carrion") with ethnic nationalism, though he states that "neither subtext goes much of anywhere". Julie Bloom echoed similar sentiments in The New York Times, writing that while the film "revels in gore and gruesome displays of horror... it also delves into the dynamics of a wholly female community, touching on issues of power, manipulation, motherhood and the horrible things some women can do to other women and themselves."

Matt Goldberg of Collider interprets a perfidious form of motherhood as a core theme of the film, as he notes the matrons merely pretend "to be motherly towards the students, [but] they're actually just using them for their power." Madame Blanc's near-decapitation at the hands of Mother Markos when she is resistant to beginning the sabbath demonstrates that Blanc and Markos "do not share the same values", and that Blanc has formed a genuine kinship with Susie. Hannah Ewens of Vice notes: "With coven power transferred to Susie, it's impossible to say where her talent ends and the influence of the mothers begins. Mothers aren't supposed to have favorites, but deep down they often do—and Madame Blanc's is Susie from the moment of her audition."

=== Abuse of power and national guilt ===
For the majority of the film, Susie appears to be an otherwise normal woman who finds her natural talents rewarded and prized by the coven. As the film progresses into its final act, however, it is revealed that Susie is in fact Mother Suspiriorum, one of the Three Mothers whom the coven exalts. Film Crit Hulk, a pseudonymous writer for The New York Observer, interprets Susie's character arc as the discovery of her shadow self: "Initially she seems just a fresh-faced girl from Ohio, eager to make strides into this esteemed dance company. But her shadow self is soon awoken, which we are meant to fear. Susie unleashes her libido as the rapturous demon below claws at the floor. She turns deeply sexual, almost becoming carnal as she writhes to the ground." Similarly to Goldberg, they interpret Susie's unveiling of herself as Mother Suspiriorium to be messianic in nature, as she eradicates the corrupted Mother Markos and the loyal followers who idolize her. Goldberg reads Susie's destruction of Markos and her followers as retribution for their abuse of power:

Guadagnino is repeatedly hitting on a world where power has been abused, and those who feel no guilt or shame are running rampant. We see it in Klemperer's history as a Holocaust survivor; we see it in the current events that pop up in the news during the movie; and we see it inside the coven where the older women who are supposed to be teaching and helping the students are instead preying on them. The movie isn't saying that powerful women are bad; it's saying that anyone who abuses their power to their own ends rather than serving others is perverting that power.

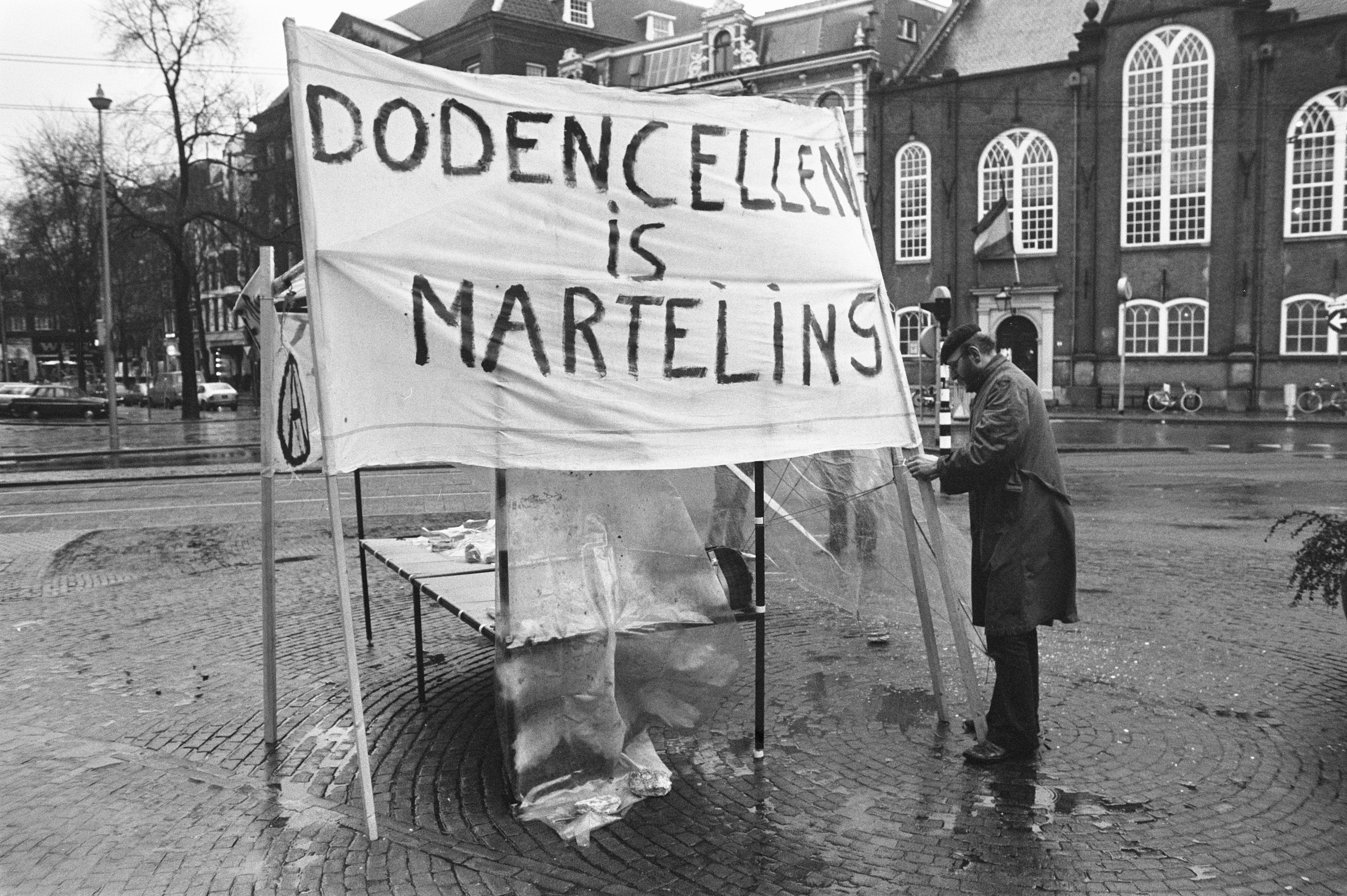
The historical events surrounding the Red Army Faction and Vergangenheitsbewältigung serve as the backdrop for the film's themes of corruption within the coven. (pictured: Dutch RAF supporters, 1974)

While Susie/Mother Suspiriorum shows no mercy for Markos and her followers, Goldberg asserts that she is capable of compassion, citing the fact that she grants the physically devastated Sara, Olga, and Patricia "the sweet release of a gentle death rather than obliterating them." Goldberg extends this interpretation to Susie/Mother Suspiriorum's visit to Klemperer in the epilogue, during which she relates his lost wife's death in a concentration camp, information he had not previously known. Goldberg reads the sequence as an emphasis that "women bonding together have the power to remove the fear of death, and that while the world—especially the powerful—need 'guilt' and 'shame,' Klemperer should not feel those things because he has not abused his power. He's the "witness" and from the perspective of witnessing an authoritarian rise to power—in his case, Nazi Germany—he is responsible for watching and doing nothing. However, it's people in power who need guilt and shame."

Some critics have alternately interpreted the representation of the coven's power as inspiring fear of women's autonomy and linking it solely with violence. Sonia Rao of The Washington Post notes that while "Guadagnino grants these women power", their power "knows no bounds. Madam Blanc... can turn Susie's dreams into bloodcurdling nightmares. She and the other matrons can inflict injuries on dancers whenever and wherever they want. The witches frequently inflict or inspire violence—their actions, after all, are what make this a horror movie. But some critics say this makes it seem like a woman with a great amount of power is someone who should be feared." The Chicago Reader's Andrea Thompson echoes this sentiment, writing that the film adopts a vision where "when women are united, it is always to achieve an evil outcome." Andrew Whalen of Newsweek conversely suggests that the film "decimat[es] typical narrative conventions of good and bad... Evil is disturbingly natural in Suspiria, where sometimes only further violence can make room for good to exist at all." Whalen characterizes the coven as "a working alternative to the patriarchy falling apart outside [the] doors—financially autonomous, beyond the reach of the police... and deeply, powerfully collectivist, both materially and spiritually."

The narrative of the coven and Susie/Mother Suspiriorum's infiltration of it is underpinned by numerous historical incidents, including the hijacking of Lufthansa Flight 181, bombings, and numerous kidnappings perpetrated by the Red Army Faction, a Marxist group whose peak activity occurred in the autumn of 1977 in West Germany. These events occurred in the wake of Vergangenheitsbewältigung, a period referring to Germany's national reflection on their culpability in World War II and the Holocaust, which "echoes constantly throughout" the film. While Goldberg has pointed out correlations between the coven's inner workings and the national events occurring outside of it, others, such as Simon Abrams of The Hollywood Reporter, view them as "surface-level parallels between historic signifiers" that "have the odd effect of subordinating those female-centered themes to a blandly familiar grab bag of sensationalistic headlines." Abrams concludes that the film offers "an underdeveloped, pseudo-Jungian understanding of how historical events kinda/sorta overshadow their protagonists' lives."

== Production ==
=== Development ===
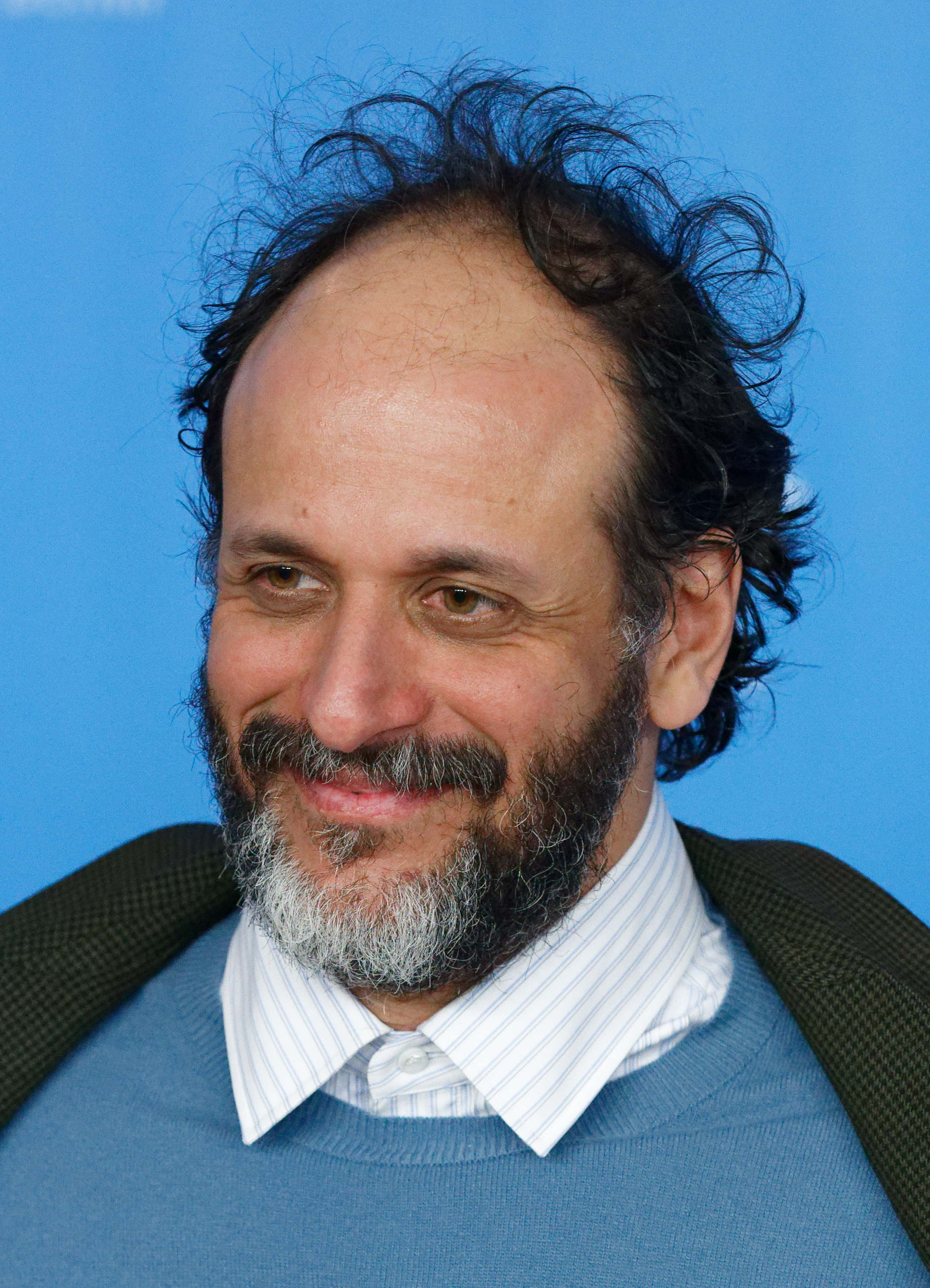
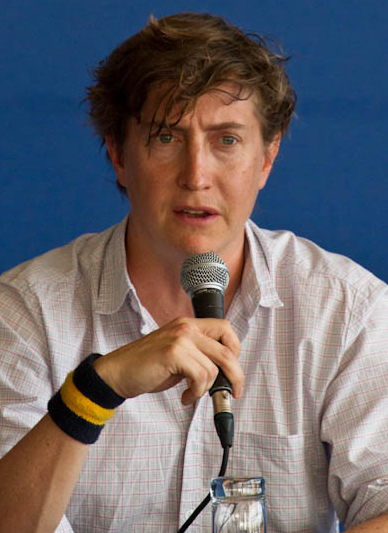
Luca Guadagnino (left) originally optioned the film for David Gordon Green (right) to direct in 2007. After Green's film was canceled, Guadagnino took over directing the project with a new screenplay by David Kajganich.

A remake of Suspiria (1977) was announced in 2008 by director David Gordon Green, who had co-written a script with his sound designer. In 2007, Luca Guadagnino had convinced the original film's creators Dario Argento and Daria Nicolodi to allow him to option a remake of the film. Guadagnino subsequently offered the project to Green, who cast Isabelle Huppert, Janet McTeer, and Isabelle Fuhrman. Green described his screenplay as "operatic", adding, "I love Argento's film and we wrote a very faithful, extremely elegant opera ... I don't mean musical opera, but it would be incredibly heightened music, and heightened and very operatic and elegant sets." According to Green, financing conflicts resulted in the project being scrapped.

In September 2015, at the 72nd Venice Film Festival, Guadagnino announced plans to direct a "remake" of Suspiria with the four main actors of his film A Bigger Splash, which had premiered at the festival. Guadagnino revealed that his version was to be set in Berlin circa 1977, and would have as its main theme "the uncompromising force of motherhood". Guadagnino has since said explicitly that the film is not a remake, but is instead a "homage" to the "powerful emotion" he felt when he first watched the original film:

I was so terrified, but as always with something that terrifies you, I was completely pulled in. I think the process of how that movie influenced my psyche probably has yet to stop, which is something that happens often when you bump into a serious work of art like Suspiria. I think the movie I made, in a way, [represents] some of the layers of [my] upbringing, watching the movie for the first time and thinking of it and being obsessed by it.

Guadagnino said in 2018 that he felt Suspiria was his most personal film to date. The film was a co-production between the United States and Italy.

=== Screenplay ===
The screenplay was written by American writer David Kajganich, who had previously written Guadagnino's A Bigger Splash. Though Kajganich admitted to not being a fan of the original film, he agreed to write a screenplay for Guadagnino. On writing the film, Kajganich stated:

Horror often loses me when it starts to no longer regard real people in a real world. And so, I said to Luca when he asked me would I ever be interested in joining him in this, I did say 'I will take quite a practical approach if you're okay with that. I would want to know how something like this could happen, how it would work, what the hierarchy of the coven would be, you know, all of those practical questions that normally aren't maybe of interest to a typical horror film, whatever that is,' and he was all for it. And so, I did quite a lot of research and to actual witchcraft and covens and we did quite a lot of research into the period that it's set in, what was going on in feminist politics and feminist art then, and how were concerns being exploited from the inside out and how that might look inside of the context of the occult. And so, you know, we did try to ground it and how real people in these fantastical situations might behave.

Kajganich chose to set the film in Berlin in 1977—the year the original film was released—during the series of terrorist events known as the "German Autumn". The film begins shortly after the hijacking of Lufthansa Flight 181, in order to hint at "larger thematic concerns", specifically the response of the youth of the era to the denial by their parents' and grandparents' generations of German culpability in World War II. Kajganich used the political tumult of the time as a means of contextualizing the central plot surrounding the Markos dance academy, "where an American is getting her education in a way in how a modern kind of fascism might look." For inspiration, Kajganich studied women's literature of the period, as well as the films of German contemporary filmmaker Rainer Werner Fassbinder, and "listened to a lot of [German singer] Nico".

Guadagnino was mostly interested in the witchcraft and solidarity among women aspects of Kajganich's script, themes which he said have been "perverted by the official history and the official religions as making a bargain with the devil. The witchcraft that I'm interested in also has a lot to do with what, psychoanalytically, is called the concept of the terrible mother, which you can see also in some religions, particularly in the Kali goddess." Retaining the dance academy locale, Kajganich proposed that the witches would transmit their spells via movement: "It makes total sense why a coven would hide in a dance company, because they could wield their influence in public ways, without the public realizing." Kajganich pitched this concept to Guadagnino early on, and shaped the screenplay using dance as a narrative through-line. Guadagnino was also enthusiastic in response to Kajganich's setting of the film, remarking: "Dario's movie was a sort of self-contained box of fleshy delicacies, which was not in relationship with the moment it was made. It was too much of an opportunity for me and David to actually say, 'It's 1977 – deal with it, let's make it the center of the story.'"

=== Casting ===
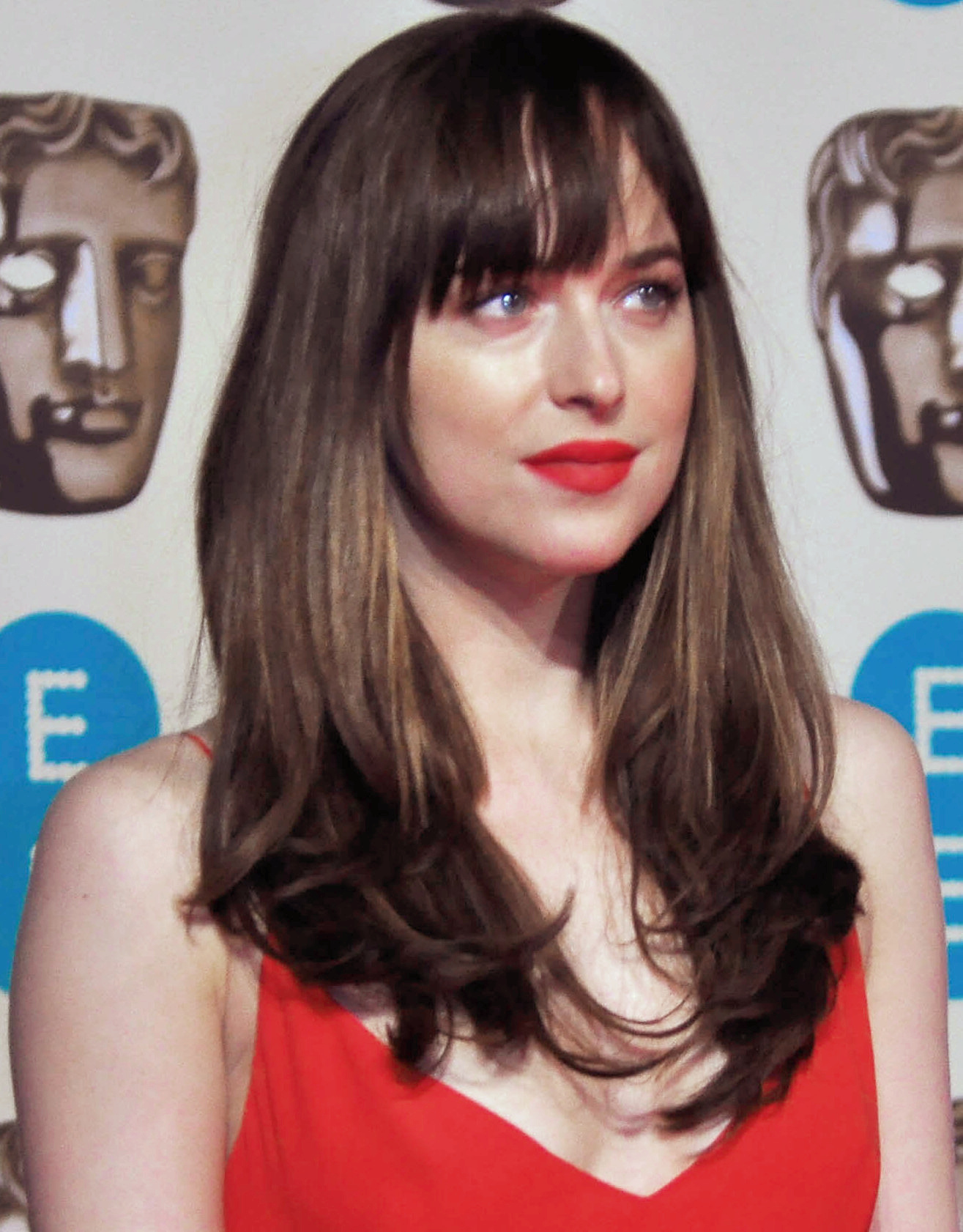
Johnson was cast in the lead after appearing in Guadagnino's A Bigger Splash (2015).

On November 23, 2015, Guadagnino confirmed that Tilda Swinton and Dakota Johnson had been cast in the film and that shooting was scheduled to begin in August 2016, with release set for 2017. Johnson was asked to play the part of Susie Bannion while filming Guadagnino's A Bigger Splash. After watching the original film, Johnson agreed to commit to the project. "I was obviously really invested—really invested in Luca as a person, collaborator, artist", Johnson said. "You just want to go on any adventure with him."

Swinton, a friend and frequent collaborator of Guadagnino who had also co-starred in A Bigger Splash, was cast in three roles: Madame Blanc, the lead choreographer of the academy; Helena Markos, its decrepit matron; and Dr. Josef Klemperer, a psychologist who becomes embroiled in the coven. In the part of Klemperer, Swinton is credited as "Lutz Ebersdorf". Swinton stated that she modeled her portrayal of Madame Blanc after Martha Graham and Pina Bausch, who she felt embodied "the shape Madame Blanc cuts — her silhouette, her barefoot rootedness, the precise choreography of her relationship with cigarette after cigarette."

In October 2016, Chloë Grace Moretz was cast as Patricia Hingle, a student who goes missing from the academy, while Mia Goth was cast as Sara, another one of the academy's dancers. Moretz commented on her participation in the film: "It's unlike any other directing process I have ever been a part of... Luca is Luca and there's kind of no mistaking it for anything else. He'll let you do the craziest stuff on screen and won't bat an eye, he'll tell you to go farther."

Also cast were European actresses Sylvie Testud, Angela Winkler, Fabrizia Sacchi, and Renée Soutendijk, each as matrons of the academy. Fashion models Małgosia Bela and Alek Wek appear in their feature film debuts as Susie's mother and another of the academy matrons, respectively. Jessica Harper, who played Suzy Bannion in the original film, also joined the cast as Anke Meier, the wife of Klemperer who disappeared during the Nazi invasion. Harper was asked to appear in the cameo by Guadaganino, but under the provision that she would be able to perform in German. To prepare, she took German classes at a Berlitz school.

==== Lutz Ebersdorf ====
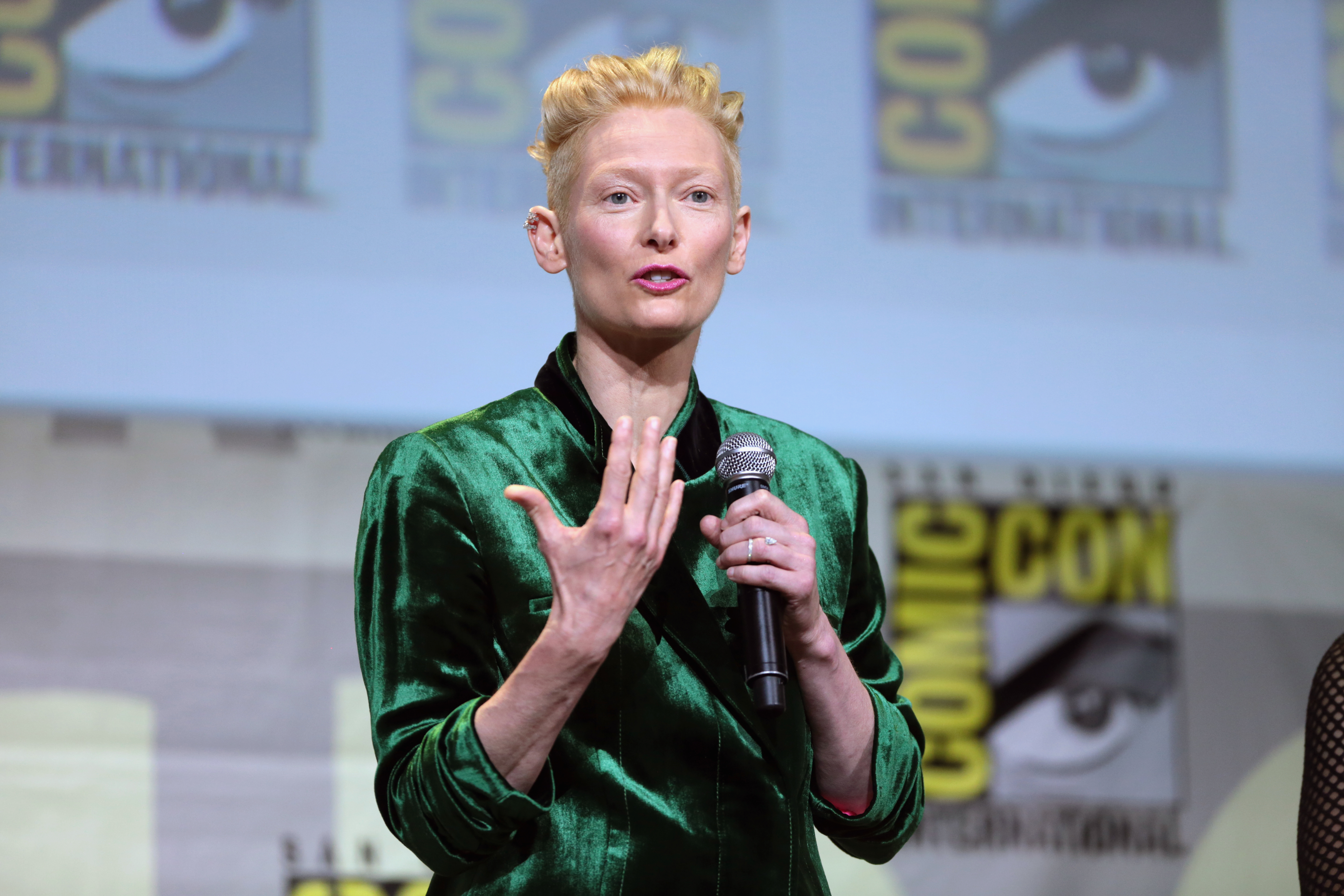
Swinton is credited as "Lutz Ebersdorf" in the role of Josef Klemperer.

The role of Dr. Josef Klemperer is portrayed by Swinton, although it is credited as played by an actor named Lutz Ebersdorf in the film and its promotional material, and the filmmakers maintained that Ebersdorf was a real psychoanalyst until a month after the film's premiere.

In March 2017, photographs of a seemingly old man spotted on the film's set were published online, identifying the man as Swinton in heavy prosthetic makeup. In February 2018, Guadagnino called the claim "complete fake news", saying that the man was not Swinton but in fact a German actor named Lutz Ebersdorf in his screen debut, who plays a psychoanalyst named Josef Klemperer in the film and is a psychoanalyst himself. IndieWire questioned the veracity of Guadagnino's statement because of Ebersdorf's suspicious IMDb profile and otherwise lack of online presence. The film's casting director and executive producer Stella Savino responded to IndieWire, saying, "the character of Dr. Klemperer has been played by Professor Lutz Ebersdorf, a psychoanalyst and not at all a professional actor." During a press conference following the film's September 1, 2018, premiere at Venice, Swinton read a letter purportedly written from Ebersdorf in lieu of his presence, which read: "I am a private individual who prefers to remain private ... Though I strongly suspect Suspiria will be the only film I ever appear in, I like the work, and I do not mind getting up very early."

Writing for Vanity Fair, Joanna Robinson reported that when the film screened at Fantastic Fest in Austin, Texas, on September 23, 2018, the audience was certain that the role of Klemperer was played by Swinton. Robinson speculated that the filmmakers wrote the role and cast Swinton in order for the film to have both an outsider's perspective and a narrative of female power. By September 2018, IMDb had deleted Ebersdorf's profile and credited Swinton as playing Klemperer under the alias "Lutz Ebersdorf".

In October 2018, Swinton told The New York Times that Dr. Klemperer was played by Lutz Ebersdorf and Ebersdorf was played by her. When asked why she played Ebersdorf, she said, "for the sheer sake of fun above all... The intention was never to fool anybody. The genius of [makeup artist] Mark Coulier notwithstanding, it was always our design that there would be something unresolved about the identity of the performance of Klemperer." Swinton asked the makeup department to make a prosthetic penis, which she wore during filming. Swinton wrote Ebersdorf's IMDb biography herself. Guadagnino stated in a subsequent interview in Vulture that several of the actors in the film believed Ebersdorf to be a real person, specifically Ingrid Caven, who was unaware it was Swinton in disguise until after filming wrapped.

=== Filming ===
==== Locations and design ====
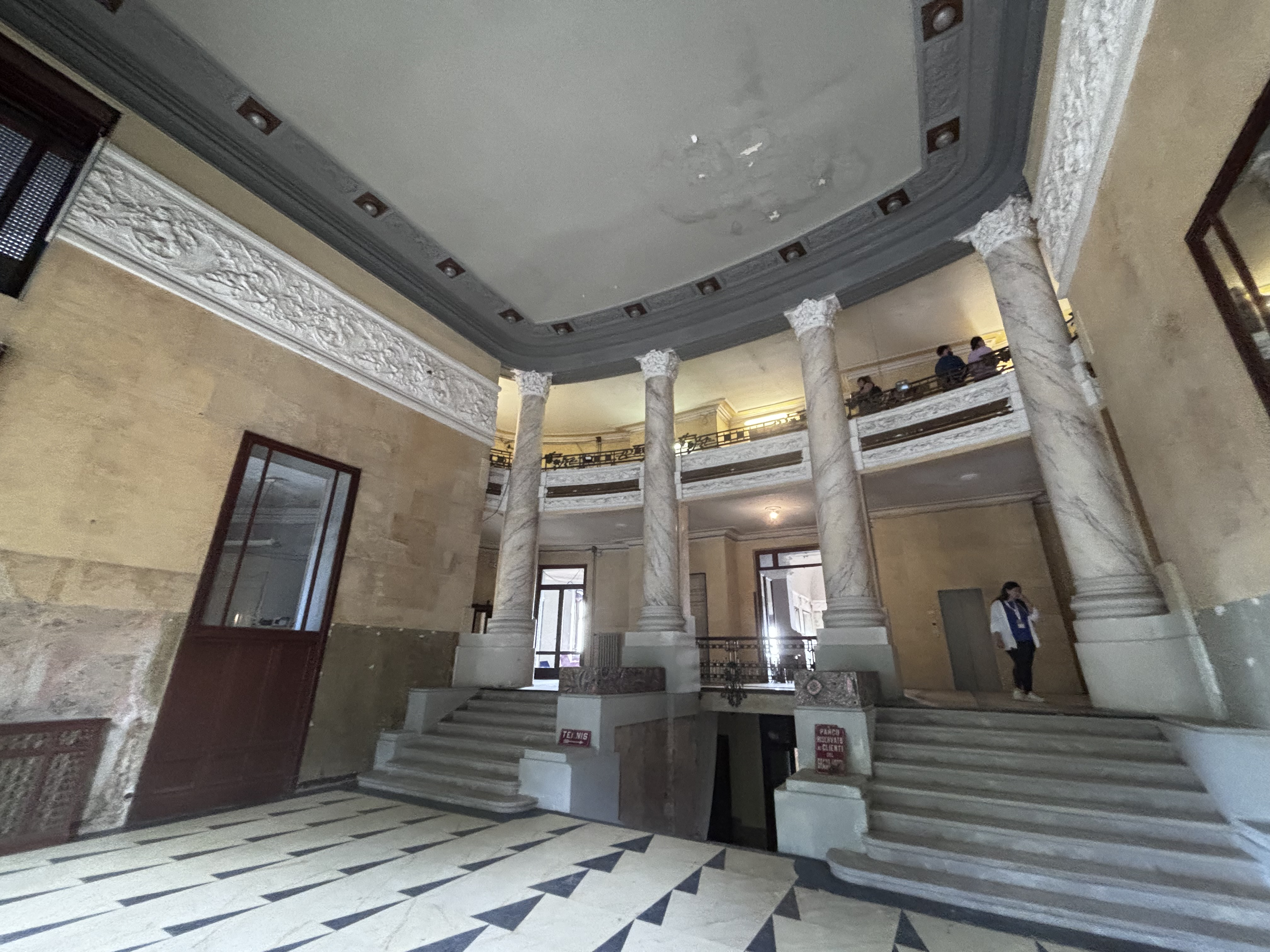
The derelict Grand Hotel Campo dei Fiori in Varese served as the Markos Academy.

While some filming took place at the Palazzo Estense in December 2016, the central shooting location was the Grand Hotel Campo Dei Fiori in Varese, Italy, which served as the Markos Dance Academy. In the film, the hotel appears to be positioned in West Berlin along the Berlin Wall, but the actual location of the building is on a remote mountaintop overlooking Varese.

Inbal Weinberg, the film's production designer, commented: "When we arrived in Italy, we went to scout for alternative places, because this was logistically going to be almost a nightmare... the hotel had so much going for it." Weinberg dressed the Grand Hotel Campo dei Fiori's interiors with dressings and furniture from various decades to give it an "intentionally out-of-time feeling." German Bauhaus geometric designs were used for certain interiors, such as the carpets of Madame Blanc's apartment, while Modernist architecture served as a constant reference point. The Frankfurt kitchen, a mass-produced fitted kitchen introduced in 1926, was the basis for the matrons' kitchen design, as well as the Sonneveld House in Rotterdam. In designing the dancers' dormitories, Weinberg dressed them with posters from contemporaneous underground bands, and "plasticky" furnishings from the 1970s. Costume designer Giulia Piersanti selected vintage clothing from the period that was "colorful, but not necessarily bright." Many of the costumes in the film were purchased from a used clothing warehouse in Prato, Italy.

For the film's climactic sabbath scene, the production used a loggia in the hotel, filling in its arches which were then meticulously covered with braided hair. "It was Luca's idea to use hair", said Weinberg. "We conceptually decided that the texture of the wall is the hair of victims." The process of weaving the artificial hair took the design crew weeks to complete.

==== Principal photography ====
Principal photography began at the Grand Hotel Campo dei Fiori in Varese on October 31, 2016, with a production budget of $20 million. The shoot lasted approximately two months, concluding in December 2016, while the remainder of principal photography was finished in early 2017, concluding in Berlin on March 10, 2017. Approximately two weeks were spent in Berlin, during which filming of the street and U-Bahn sequences took place, as well as those occurring at the police station, which was shot in an abandoned office building in Mitte. The scenes of Klemperer at his dacha were shot in suburban Berlin.

The filming conditions at the Grand Hotel Campo dei Fiori were described as uncomfortable by the cast and crew, as the film was shot in the winter months and the hotel was inefficiently heated with gasoline space heaters. The hotel, which had been abandoned for several decades, had been adorned with cellular towers on the rooftop; Guadagnino recalled a "constant signal coming from the antennas that made all of us very weak and tired", while Johnson stated "there was electricity pulsating through the building, and everyone was shocking each other." She retrospectively commented that the filming process "fucked me up so much that I had to go to therapy". She later expanded on this statement, saying that the filming process "was not traumatic" and instead "the most fun and the most exhilarating and the most joyful that it could be... [but] when you're working sometimes with dark subject matter, it can stay with you and then to talk to somebody really nice about it afterwards is a really nice way to move on from the project." Harper, who worked on the film for only several days but was present during portions of the shoot, likened the locale to a "haunted house... It was cold and dark and scary... which was kind of appropriate, but not ideal shooting circumstances." The production's first assistant director broke his leg early into the shoot after falling on one of the sets.

==== Cinematography ====
Where Argento's film used lavish colors, Guadagnino opted for a muted, "winter-ish" appearance devoid of primary colors.

Like its predecessor, Suspiria was shot on 35mm film stock. Cinematographer Sayombhu Mukdeeprom, who had previously worked on Guadagnino's Call Me by Your Name (2017), shot the film exclusively on Kodak Vision3 500T 5219, without correction filters. To achieve a 1970s-style effect, the film uses slow motion and numerous camera zooms typical of the period, including recurrent use of snap zooms.

In contrast to the original, Guadagnino's film uses primary colors sparingly. He described the film's look as "winter-ish, evil, and really dark." According to Guadagnino, the decision not to use primary colors was made in accordance with the film's bleak setting amidst Germany on "the verge of a civil war". Rather than using lavish color like Argento did in his original film, Guadagnino stated he and Mukdeeprom "went for a different take. Dario Argento and let's face it, Luciano Tovoli, his wonderful D.P., they decided to go for an extremely expressionistic way of decoding horror, which started from the work of Mario Bava. The way in which they made those colors — not just simple gels in front of lights, they were using velvet and they were really sculpting the light — [that] has influenced filmmakers for so long. I think everything that could have been said through that style has been said."

In opting for a more muted color palette, the filmmakers used cinematographer Michael Ballhaus's work in the films of Rainer Fassbinder as reference points, as well as the work of modernist artist Balthus, which Guadagnino felt "created such uncanny eeriness and fear". The compositions, costumes, and set design were all crafted with this in mind, and prominently feature browns, blacks, blues, and greens.

=== Special effects ===
Makeup artist Mark Coulier served as the film's makeup effects coordinator. The bulk of the special effects featured in the film were achieved via practical methods. According to Coulier, the death sequence of Olga, and the final sabbath scene were the most demanding in regard to special effects. For the former, a prosthetic arm, leg, broken ribs, and a protruding dental cast were created for actress Elena Fokina (Olga), allowing her to appear as though the bones in her limbs, abdomen, and jaw were being crushed and broken. Fokina, a professional dancer and contortionist, achieved the majority of the contortions herself, while her actual arm and leg were removed from the footage in post-production via digital processing. In conceiving Olga's broken arm, Coulier was inspired by a stunt performed by Ronny Cox in Deliverance (1972), in which he dislocated his own shoulder in the film.

The witches' sabbath that serves as the climax of the film was technically complicated due to Swinton's portrayal of three roles, each of which required their own unique and extensive makeup effects, as well as full-body prosthetics. Additional prosthetics were created to achieve the disfigured appearance of Patricia, as well as the disembowellment of Sara. "We had so many other makeup effects and full-body prosthetics going on", Coulier recalled. "We had Chloë Moretz in her dead-Patricia makeup, we had the intestines being pulled out, we had all sorts of stuff. It was a big challenge, and we had about 20 people on set, all applying makeups for that long sequence." The wound which Susie tears open on her chest in the climax was also achieved with prosthetics, though it was digitally enhanced in post-production.

=== Choreography ===
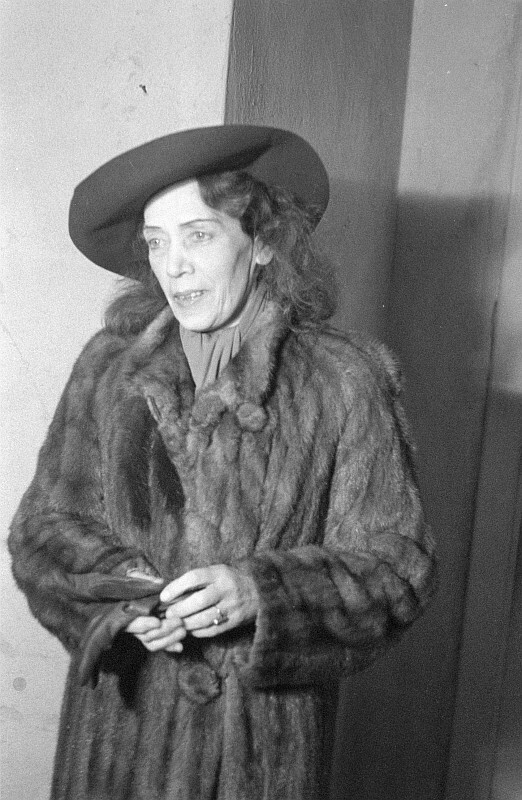
Expressionist dancer Mary Wigman (pictured here in 1946) served as an influence on the film's dance sequences.

Unlike the original film, which, though set at a ballet academy, featured very little on-screen dancing, Guadagnino's Suspiria uses dance as a key plot device. Congruous to the period in which it is set, contemporary dance was a central influence on the dance style depicted in the film. Kajganich commented that German expressionist dancers Mary Wigman and Pina Bausch were specific influences on his conceptualization of the dance routines. While writing the screenplay, Kajganich shadowed choreographer and dancer Sasha Waltz to gain further insight into the technicalities of the profession. The work of Isadora Duncan was also an influence.

Damien Jalet choreographed the elaborate dance sequences in the film. Guadagnino hired him after seeing a live performance of Jalet's Les Médusées (transl. "The Bewitched"), at the Louvre. Incidentally, Jalet had drawn inspiration from Argento's Suspiria when choreographing Les Médusées. Jalet subsequently used Les Médusées as the basis for the film's six-minute climactic dance sequence called "Volk". For the last sabbath scene, Jalet said: "We wanted to go from something pretty technical, mathematical, with a certain sense of elegance to something where the body becomes wilder and more and more distorted", Jalet commented. "The scene described something very chaotic, but I felt we needed to create something still very ritualized." Indonesian dance also served as a reference point for the sequence, which features movements that are "staccato, with harsh stops and starts, and an arm styling that is both intimate—in moments when the dancers hold on to each other—and harshly linear."

Aside from Johnson and Goth, all of the actresses in the on-screen dance scenes were professional dancers. Johnson trained extensively in the year leading up to the shoot to achieve the body type and technique of a dancer, spending two hours each day training at a dance studio in Vancouver while filming Fifty Shades Freed (2018). She trained in various forms of dance ranging from ballet to contemporary dance, as her character is that of a formally untrained, yet broadly proficient, dancer. Johnson also studied the work of Wigman, and listened to various musical acts of the 1970s, such as The Carpenters, Jefferson Airplane, and Nina Simone, artists she felt would have informed her character's instinctive movements. In the early autumn of 2016, roughly two months before the shoot began, both Johnson and Goth began rehearsing the film's choreography on location in Varese for six to eight hours per day.

=== Music ===
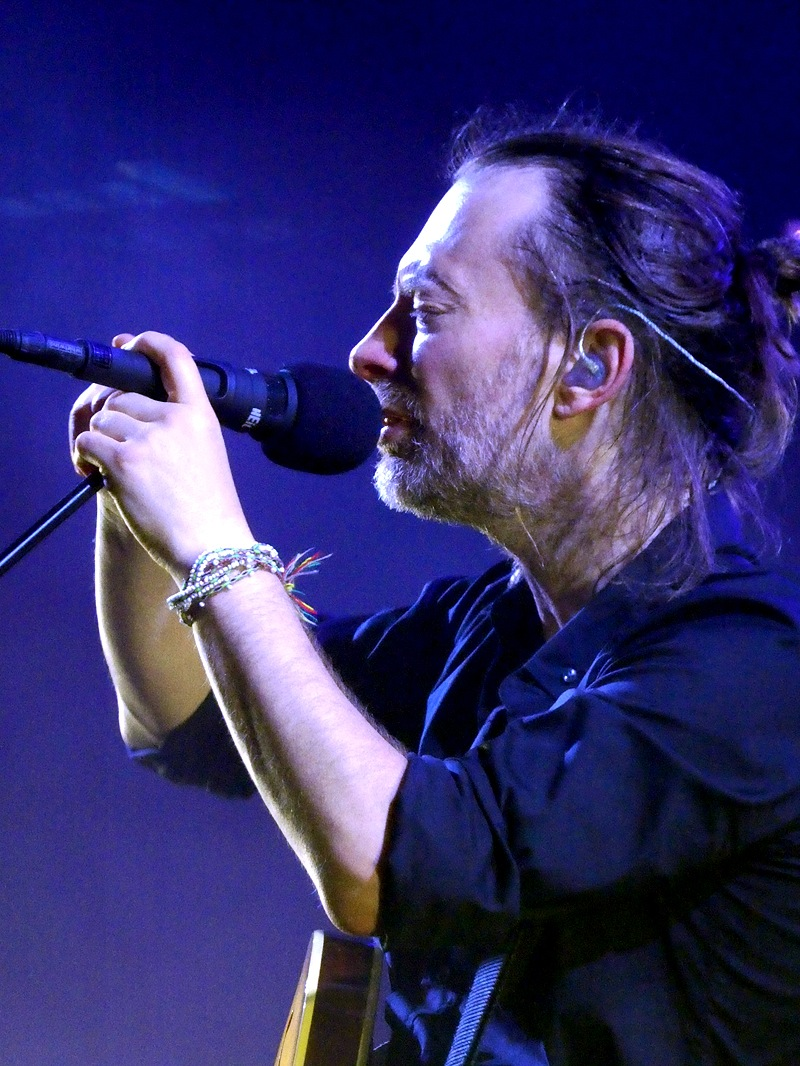
Thom Yorke (pictured 2016) composed the score.

Radiohead singer Thom Yorke composed the score, his first feature film soundtrack. It features the London Contemporary Orchestra and Yorke's son Noah on drums. He initially refused the offer, but accepted after months of requests from Guadagnino. Much of the score was completed prior to the film shoot, giving Guadagnino the opportunity to play it on set during filming.

Yorke cited inspiration from the 1982 Blade Runner soundtrack, musique concrète artists such as Pierre Henry, modern electronic artists such as James Holden, and music from the film's 1977 Berlin setting, such as krautrock. He said: "There's a way of repeating in music that can hypnotise. I kept thinking to myself that it's a form of making spells. So when I was working in my studio I was making spells. I know it sounds really stupid, but that's how I was thinking about it." The soundtrack was released on October 26, 2018, by XL Recordings.

== Release ==
In promotion for the film, a scene was screened during a luncheon at the 2018 CinemaCon in Las Vegas, Nevada, in April 2018. It was reported that the footage was so intense it "traumatized" those present. The scene presented was that in which Olga is contorted and mangled via movements made during Susie's improvisational dance. Peter Sciretta of /Film described the scene as "very gruesome and hard to watch. This film will make most people feel uneasy." In May 2018, Videa acquired Italian distribution rights to the film.

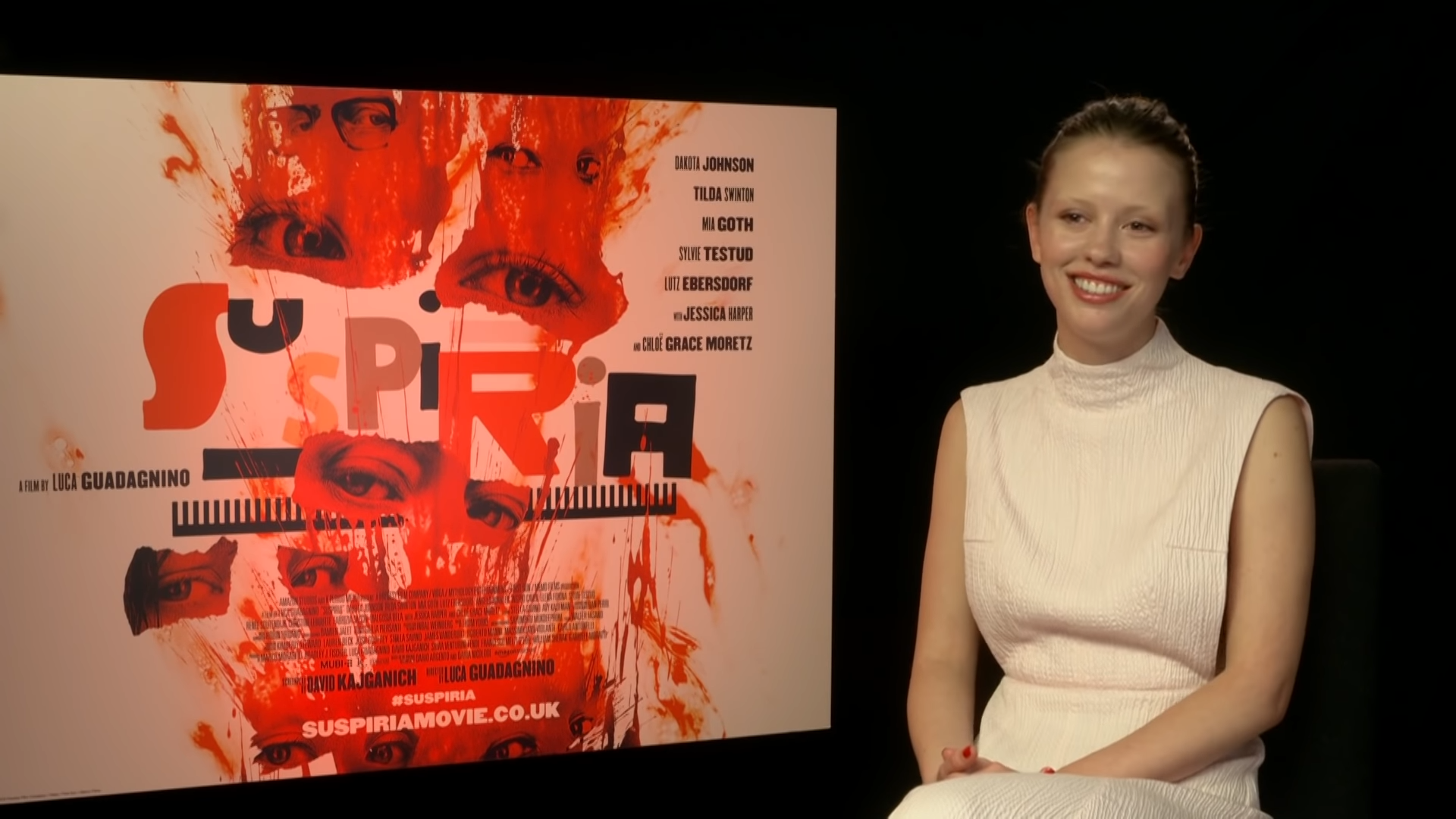
Goth promoting the film at the Venice Film Festival

Suspiria held its world premiere at the 75th Venice International Film Festival on September 1, 2018. It opened in a limited release in Los Angeles and New York on October 26, 2018. Guadagnino held an exclusive Q&A session during the film's opening weekend in Los Angeles. Limited screenings began on Halloween night in various US cities, including Dallas, Denver, Portland, San Francisco, Seattle, Springfield, and Tempe. The US release expanded to a total of 311 screens on November 2, 2018. It was released in the United Kingdom by Mubi on November 16, 2018. It was released in Italy on January 1, 2019.

=== Home media ===
Suspiria was released in the United States on digital platforms on January 15, 2019, and on Blu-ray on January 29, through Lionsgate. The digital and Blu-ray releases include three behind-the-scenes featurettes. As of July 2019, the film has made $1.1 million in Blu-ray sales.

== Reception ==
=== Box office ===
Suspiria grossed a total of $179,806 during its opening weekend playing at the ArcLight Hollywood and Regal Union Square in Los Angeles and New York, respectively. This marked an average of $89,903 per screen, the highest screen-average box office launch of the year. Upon its expansion the following week, the film grossed $964,722 between November 2 and 4, ranking number 19 at the US box office. The film had closed on December 20 after it grossed $5,169,833 internationally, and $2,483,472 in the United States, making for a worldwide gross of $7,653,305. In 2020, Guadagnino said Suspiria had "made absolutely nothing. It was a disaster at the box office."

=== Critical response ===
The critical responses to Suspiria were strongly polarized upon its release. Peter Travers of Rolling Stone stressed that "polarizing" served as "too tame a word" to describe the reactions to the film. On review aggregator Rotten Tomatoes, the film has an approval rating of 65% based on 335 reviews, with an average rating of 6.9/10. The website's critical consensus reads: "Suspiria attacks heady themes with garish vigor, offering a viewing experience that's daringly confrontational—and definitely not for everyone." On Metacritic, the film has an average weighted score of 64 out of 100, based on 56 critics, indicating "generally favorable reviews".

"Guadagnino, who has said he wanted to remake Suspiria since he first saw it more than 30 years ago, signals both his reverence and his seriousness by departing from it in every way imaginable — visually, sonically, dramatically, emotionally."

— Justin Chang of the Los Angeles Times

Commenting on the horror elements of the film, Andrew Whalen of Newsweek deemed it "a powerful and dread-inducing experience even before it reveals itself to be not just an arthouse exploration of a horror aesthetic." He also compared the body horror in the film to that of the works of David Cronenberg. Like Whalen, Kristen Kim of The Nation observed similar elements, and wrote that it took "the body horror of the original to an unsightly new level. If the blood runs pretty in the old Suspiria, it's urine here that trickles down the legs of a painfully contorted ballerina." Writing in Variety, Owen Gleiberman compared certain visual elements of the film to The Exorcist (1973) and summarized it as a "gory but imperiously lofty matriarchal horror film", though he noted that the film would have benefited from more shocks. The Boston Globe's Ty Burr described the film's finale as "Lovecraftian" but concluded that what it "mostly leaves behind is an acrid taste of having experienced something stylish but unfulfilling."

The Los Angeles Times's Justin Chang felt that the reimagining of witchcraft is "boldly absurd" and concluded: "By the time the phantasmagorical finale arrives, you are flooded with blood and viscera, yes, but also something even more unsettling — a sudden onrush of feeling, a deep, overpowering melancholy. It's the most startling of the movie's transfigurations, and it returns us to the primordial theme of motherhood." Anthony Lane of The New Yorker wrote a favorable review of the film, concluding: "The first time I saw Guadagnino's Suspiria, I came out pretty much covered in gore, and confounded by the surfeit of stories. Can a splash be so big that it drowns the senses? How does such a film cohere? The second time around, I followed the flow, and found that what it led to was not terror, or disgust, but an unexpected sadness." David Ehrlich, who gave the film an A−, commented in IndieWire that "Suspiria is a film of rare and unfettered madness, and it leaves behind a scalding message that's written in pain and blood: The future will be a nightmare if we can't take responsibility for the past." Slant Magazine's Greg Cwik praised the cinematography, but expressed disappointment for what he felt was a lack of cohesion: "Suspiria is a largely befuddling accumulation of shots and sounds that never coalesce."

The film's length and pacing were noted by several critics who had varying opinions: David Rooney of The Hollywood Reporter criticized the film for being "unnecessarily drawn out" with "too many discursive shifts to build much tension", while Peter Bradshaw of The Guardian described it as "more an MA thesis than a remake... determinedly upscale and uppermiddlebrow, with indigestible new layers of historical meaning added." Manohla Dargis of The New York Times criticized the pacing and runtime, writing: "As the first hour of Suspiria grinds into the second and beyond (the movie runs 152 minutes), it grows ever more distended and yet more hollow. Unlike Argento, who seemed content to deliver a nastily updated fairy tale in 90 or so minutes, Guadagnino continues casting about for meaning, which perhaps explains why he keeps adding more stuff, more mayhem, more dances." Telegraph critic Robbie Collin, however, praised the film for being a "slow burner", awarding it five out of five and stating that he considered it a better film than the original. Chris Klimek of NPR alternately deemed the film "a confounding and often punishing experience... simply keeping up with the plot, despite its pokey pace, is ultimately exhausting." William Bibbiani of IGN echoed this sentiment, summarizing the film as "an interesting intellectual exercise, too ambitious to be ignored yet too overbearing to be enjoyed." Travers conceded that "Guadagnino's reach far exceeds his grasp", but concluded: "to watch him excavate evil to find a sorrowful truth is something you won't want to miss."

"Guadagnino is so busy directing a movie about women in the abstract, witchcraft in the abstract, dance in the abstract, terrorism in the abstract, the Holocaust in the abstract, Berlin and Germany in the abstract, that he doesn't see the people, the places, the characters that he's filming. His camera sees nothing."

— Richard Brody, writing in The New Yorker

Numerous critics commented on the themes of German history and the Holocaust. Brian Truitt of USA Today wrote that the subtext and subplots were "bound to alienate some", but that "those with a penchant for the new wave of psychological horror and a healthy respect for B-movie camp will love this thing to the crazy last dance", while Stephanie Zacharek of Time criticized the political backdrop as "an extra layer of needless complication." This sentiment was reiterated by Richard Brody, writing for The New Yorker, who felt that the filmmakers "shoehorn the Holocaust into the film with a conspicuously effortful shove... The movie has nothing to say about women's history, feminist politics, civil violence, the Holocaust, the Cold War, or German culture. Instead, Guadagnino thrusts some thusly labelled trinkets at viewers and suggests that they try to assemble them. The result is sordid, flimsy Holocaust kitsch, fanatical chic, with all the actual political substance of a designer Che T-shirt."

Commenting on the performances of the cast, Kim Selling and Joule Zelman of The Stranger praised that of Swinton, but deemed Johnson miscast in the role of Susie, while Chang noted Swinton's performance as "one of her more restrained". Michael O'Sullivan of The Washington Post alternately considered Swinton's performance a "tour-de-force". Klimek praised the performances of all involved, while Ehrlich found Johnson's performance "thrillingly unrepentant". Truitt noted that Johnson "navigates [her role] with grace, and... captures just the right physicality in the various modern dances that ground the movie with a primordial weight and sexual energy." Sandy Schaefer of Screen Rant described Johnson's performance as "engaging" and Goth as "equally strong".

The film's elaborate dance sequences were largely praised by critics. Gleiberman praised the dances, writing that they have "so much snap and thrust and rhythm you might call it an art-conscious cousin of the pop choreography of Bob Fosse... the movement is even more jutting and explosive, but it erupts from the women's souls." The New York Times stated in an article about the film's choreography: "finally, a film that gets dance right", while BBC reviewer Nicholas Barber says "the company's choreography is woven into the story. It's all deeply impressive." Alonso Duralde of TheWrap, however, negatively compared them to the dance sequences in Showgirls (1995) and Lost Horizon (1973), deeming the sequences "unintentionally hilarious pieces of choreography. The ludicrous terpsichorean display isn't helped by the costuming; the dancers all wear bright-red ropes tied in what appear to be Japanese Shibari bondage knots." Burr alternately praised the choreography, describing it as "propulsive... and ripe with the sight and sounds of exploding body parts."

Argento was critical of the film, stating that "it did not excite me, it betrayed the spirit of the original film: there is no fear, there is no music. The film [underwhelmed] me", but he did call the film's design "beautiful".

=== Lawsuit ===
On September 27, 2018, it was reported that the film's American distributor, Amazon Studios, was being sued for copyright infringement by the estate of artist Ana Mendieta. The suit, filed in a federal court in Seattle, Washington, alleged that two images present in the film's teaser trailer were plagiarized from Mendieta's work. The first is an image of a woman's hands bound with rope on a white table, allegedly derived from Mendieta's Untitled (Rape Scene), and the other is the red silhouette of a body imprinted on a bedsheet, which was claimed to have been derived from her Silueta series.

A cease-and-desist letter had been delivered to Amazon in July over the images, and they were not included in the subsequent theatrical trailer released the following month. According to the suit, both images had been excised from the film, but an alleged eight others bore notable similarities to other works by Mendieta. On October 24, 2018, two days before the film's US release, it was reported that Amazon Studios and the Mendieta estate had reached an undisclosed settlement.

== Accolades ==
Award/association	Date of ceremony	Category	Recipient(s) and nominee(s)	Result	Ref.
Venice Film Festival	September 8, 2018	Golden Lion	Luca Guadagnino	Nominated	
Venice Film Festival	September 8, 2018	Queer Lion	Luca Guadagnino	Nominated	
Venice Film Festival	September 8, 2018	Premio Soundtrack Stars for Best Original Song	"Suspirium" by Thom Yorke	Won	
Venice Film Festival	September 8, 2018	La Pellicola d'Oro Award for Special Effects	Franco Ragusa	Won	
Independent Spirit Awards	February 23, 2019	Best Cinematography	Sayombhu Mukdeeprom	Won	
Independent Spirit Awards	February 23, 2019	Robert Altman Award	Luca Guadagnino, Avy Kaufman, Stella Savino, Małgosia Bela, Ingrid Caven, Elena Fokina, Mia Goth, Jessica Harper, Dakota Johnson, Gala Moody, Chloë Grace Moretz, Renée Soutendijk, Tilda Swinton, Sylvie Testud and Angela Winkler	Won	
Washington D.C. Area Film Critics Association	December 3, 2018	Best Original Score	Thom Yorke	Nominated	
Chicago Film Critics Association	December 8, 2018	Best Original Score	Thom Yorke	Nominated	
Los Angeles Online Film Critics Society	December 7, 2018	Best Sci-Fi/Horror Film	Suspiria	Nominated	
Indiana Film Journalists Association	December 17, 2018	Best Picture	Suspiria	Runner-up	
Indiana Film Journalists Association	December 17, 2018	Best Adapted Screenplay	David Kajganich	Runner-up	
Indiana Film Journalists Association	December 17, 2018	Best Director	Luca Guadagnino	Runner-up	
Indiana Film Journalists Association	December 17, 2018	Best Actress	Dakota Johnson	Runner-up	
Indiana Film Journalists Association	December 17, 2018	Best Supporting Actress	Tilda Swinton	Runner-up	
Indiana Film Journalists Association	December 17, 2018	Best Musical Score	Thom Yorke	Won	
Philadelphia Film Critics Circle	December 9, 2018	Best Score/Soundtrack	Thom Yorke	Won	
New Mexico Film Critics Association	December 9, 2018	Best Original Song	"Suspirium" by Thom Yorke	Won	
Seattle Film Critics Society	December 17, 2018	Best Costume Design	Giulia Piersanti	Nominated	
Seattle Film Critics Society	December 17, 2018	Best Picture	Suspiria	Nominated	
Critics' Choice Awards	January 13, 2019	Best Sci-Fi or Horror Movie	Suspiria	Nominated	
Critics' Choice Awards	January 13, 2019	Best Hair and Makeup	Suspiria	Nominated	
Phoenix Critics Circle Awards	December 15, 2018	Best Horror Film	Suspiria	Nominated	
Phoenix Critics Circle Awards	December 15, 2018	Best Score	Thom Yorke	Nominated	
Las Vegas Film Critics Society Awards	December 14, 2018	Best Score	Thom Yorke	Won	
Houston Film Critics Society Awards	January 3, 2018	Best Score	Thom Yorke	Nominated	
Houston Film Critics Society Awards	January 3, 2018	Best Poster	Suspiria	Nominated	
Music City Film Critics Association Awards	January 10, 2019	Best Horror Film	Suspiria	Nominated	
Austin Film Critics Association Awards	January 7, 2019	Best Film	Suspiria	Nominated	
Austin Film Critics Association Awards	January 7, 2019	Best Score	Thom Yorke	Nominated	
Capri Hollywood International Film Festival	January 2, 2019	Producer of The Year	Bradley J. Fischer (for Suspiria and other films)	Won	
Online Film Critics Society Awards	January 2, 2019	Best Score	Thom Yorke	Nominated	
Dorian Awards	January 8, 2019	Campy Flick of the Year	Suspiria	Nominated	
Georgia Film Critics Association Awards	January 12, 2019	Best Original Song	"Suspirium" by Thom Yorke	Nominated	
London Critics Circle Film Awards	January 20, 2019	Technical Achievement Award	Thom Yorke (music)	Nominated	
Chicago Indie Critics	February 2, 2019	Best Costume Design & Make-Up	Giulia Piersanti (costumes), Fernanda Perez (makeup)	Nominated	
International Cinephile Society Awards	February 3, 2019	Best Score	Suspiria	Nominated	
Fangoria Awards	February 25, 2019	Best Limited Release Movie	Suspiria	Nominated	
Fangoria Awards	February 25, 2019	Best Supporting Actress	Tilda Swinton	Won	
Fangoria Awards	February 25, 2019	Best Score	Thom Yorke	Nominated	
Fangoria Awards	February 25, 2019	Best Makeup FX	Mark Couiler	Won	
Grammy Awards	January 26, 2020	Best Song Written for Visual Media	"Suspirium" by Thom Yorke	Nominated	

== Proposed sequel ==
Suspiria had the working title of Suspiria: Part One, with Guadagnino and Kajganich conceiving it as the first half of a bigger story. They planned Part Two to explore the origins of Madame Blanc and Helena Markos and the future of Susie Bannion. The subtitle was dropped so that Suspiria would be thought of as a standalone work.

Guadagnino said he would be interested in developing Part Two if the film were a commercial success. He expressed interest in making a prequel about Markos, set hundreds of years before the first film, saying, "I have this image in my mind of Helena Markos in solitude in the year 1212 in Scotland or in Spain. Wandering through a village and trying to find a way on how she can manipulate the women of the village. I know she was there. I know it was six to seven hundred years before the actual storyline of this film."

In 2020, Guadagnino said a sequel was impossible, as Suspiria had been "a disaster at the box office".
