= A Five Star Life =

2013 film directed by Maria Sole Tognazzi

- Directed by: Maria Sole Tognazzi
- Starring: Margherita Buy; Stefano Accorsi; Fabrizia Sacchi; Gianmarco Tognazzi; Alessia Barela; Lesley Manville
- Cinematography: Arnaldo Catinari
- Edited by: Walter Fasano
- Music by: Gabriele Roberto
- Release date: 2013
- Running time: 85 minutes
- Box office: $2,440,993

A Five Star Life (Italian: Viaggio sola, also known as I Travel Alone) is a 2013 Italian comedy-drama film directed by Maria Sole Tognazzi. For her performance, Margherita Buy won the David di Donatello for Best Actress. The film also won the Nastro d'Argento for Best Comedy.

== Cast ==
- Margherita Buy: Irene
- Stefano Accorsi: Andrea
- Fabrizia Sacchi: Silvia
- Gianmarco Tognazzi: Tommaso
- Alessia Barela: Fabiana
- Lesley Manville: Kate Sherman
- Henry Arnold: Director

== Reception ==
=== Critical response ===
A Five Star Life has an approval rating of 62% on review aggregator website Rotten Tomatoes, based on 34 reviews, and an average rating of 6/10. The website's critical consensus states: "Modest to a fault, A Five Star Life is worth seeing chiefly for Margherita Buy's marvelous work in the central role". Metacritic assigned the film a weighted average score of 51 out of 100, based on 14 critics, indicating "mixed or average reviews".

=== Accolades ===
List of Accolades
Award / Film Festival	Category	Recipient(s)	Result
67th Silver Ribbon Awards	Best Comedy	Maria Sole Tognazzi	Won
67th Silver Ribbon Awards	Best Producer	Donatella Botti	Nominated
67th Silver Ribbon Awards	Best Story	Ivan Cotroneo Francesca Marciano and Maria Sole Tognazzi	Nominated
67th Silver Ribbon Awards	Best Actress	Margherita Buy	Nominated
67th Silver Ribbon Awards	Best Supporting Actress	Fabrizia Sacchi	Nominated
67th Silver Ribbon Awards	Best Costumes	Daniela Ciancio	Nominated
58th David di Donatello Awards	Best Script	Ivan Cotroneo Francesca Marciano and Maria Sole Tognazzi	Nominated
58th David di Donatello Awards	Best Actress	Margherita Buy	Won
58th David di Donatello Awards	Best Supporting Actor	Stefano Accorsi	Nominated
58th David di Donatello Awards	Best Supporting Actress	Fabrizia Sacchi	Nominated
58th David di Donatello Awards	Best Editing	Walter Fasano	Nominated
28th Ciak d'oro	Best Actress	Margherita Buy	Won
28th Ciak d'oro	Best Supporting Actor	Stefano Accorsi	Nominated
28th Ciak d'oro	Best Screenwriter	Ivan Cotroneo, Francesca Marciano and Maria Sole Tognazzi	Nominated
