= Summer Games (2011 film) =

2011 film

- Film poster
- Italian: Giochi d'estate
- Directed by: Rolando Colla
- Written by: Rolando Colla; Roberto Scarpetti; Pilar Anguita-MacKay
- Produced by: Elena Pedrazzoli; Ilann Girard; Amedeo Pagani
- Starring: Fiorella Campanella
- Cinematography: Lorenz Merz
- Edited by: Rolando Colla; Didier Ranz
- Music by: Bernd Schurer; Nikolaj Grandjean
- Distributed by: Look Now! Distribution (Switzerland)
- Release date: September 2011
- Running time: 101 minutes
- Countries: Switzerland; Italy
- Language: Italian

Summer Games (Italian: Giochi d'estate) is a 2011 Swiss drama film written and directed by Rolando Colla. Set in Tuscany, it follows 12-year-olds Nic and Marie while Nic’s parents try to save their marriage. The film was selected as Switzerland’s entry for the Academy Award for Best Foreign Language Film at the 84th Academy Awards, and won Best Fiction Film at the 2012 Swiss Film Awards.

== Synopsis ==
Set during summer on a campsite in the Maremma, a beach region of Tuscany, the film follows 12-year-old Nic, who struggles to express his feelings for Marie, a girl his own age, while his parents make a last effort to save their marriage.

== Cast ==
The cast includes:

- Armando Condolucci as Nic
- Fiorella Campanella as Marie
- Alessia Barela as Adriana
- Antonio Merone as Vincenzo
- Francesco Huang as Lee
- Chiara Scolari as Patty
- Marco D'Orazi as Agostino
- Roberta Fossile as Irene
- Aaron Hitz as archeologist

== Release ==
In September 2011, the film was selected as Switzerland’s entry for the Academy Award for Best Foreign Language Film. The decision was announced at Delémont-Hollywood, where the jury selected the film unanimously. Its selection was accompanied by 60,000 Swiss francs in promotional support, comprising 50,000 francs from the Federal Office of Culture and 10,000 francs from the city of Delémont. The film did not advance to the nine-film shortlist.

== Reception ==
At the 2012 Swiss Film Awards, the film won Best Fiction Film, Best Cinematography, and Best Screenplay. It also won the Zürich Film Prize in 2011, the Golden Guepard for Best Film Director at UZ Art Week in 2012, and the screenplay prize at the Fünf Seen Filmfestival in 2012.

== Festival screenings ==
The film premiered in September 2011. It was later screened at the Locarno Film Festival, the San Francisco International Film Festival, the Los Angeles Film Festival, and Camerimage in 2012, and the Ciné-Rencontres Festival de Cinéma in 2013.

== See also ==
- List of submissions to the 84th Academy Awards for Best Foreign Language Film
- List of Swiss submissions for the Academy Award for Best Foreign Language Film
