= 40th César Awards =

2015 French film awards ceremony

- The official César Award poster features French actress Fanny Ardant, in the 1983 film Vivement dimanche !
- Date: 20 February 2015
- Site: Théâtre du Châtelet, Paris, France
- Hosted by: Édouard Baer

Highlights
- Best Film: Timbuktu
- Best Actor: Pierre Niney
- Best Actress: Adèle Haenel
- Most awards: Timbuktu (7)
- Most nominations: Saint Laurent (10)

Television coverage
- Network: Canal+

The 40th César Awards ceremony, presented by the Académie des Arts et Techniques du Cinéma, honoured the best films of 2014 in France and took place on 20 February 2015 at the Théâtre du Châtelet in Paris. The ceremony was chaired by actor-director Dany Boon, with actor Édouard Baer acting as master of ceremonies for the second time.

The nominations were announced on 28 January 2015 by Édouard Baer and Academy President Alain Terzian. Saint Laurent received the most nominations with ten, followed by Love at First Fight with nine nominations.

In related events, the Médaille d'Or was awarded for the first time at a ceremony held at Monnaie de Paris on 19 January 2015. Luc Besson was honoured by the Academy for his outstanding artistic and entrepreneurial contribution to the French cinema for the past 3 decades. On 16 February 2015, in a ceremony at the Four Seasons Hotel George V, Sylvie Pialat, who produced Timbuktu via Les Films du Worso, was awarded the Prix Daniel Toscan du Plantier for producer of the year for the second consecutive year.

Timbuktu won seven awards including Best Film and Best Director for Abderrahmane Sissako. Other winners included Love at First Fight with three awards, and Yves Saint Laurent, Hippocrate, Clouds of Sils Maria, La Famille Bélier, Diplomacy, Saint Laurent, Beauty and the Beast, The Salt of the Earth, Minuscule: Valley of the Lost Ants, Les Petits Cailloux, La Femme de Rio and Mommy with one.

== Winners and nominees ==
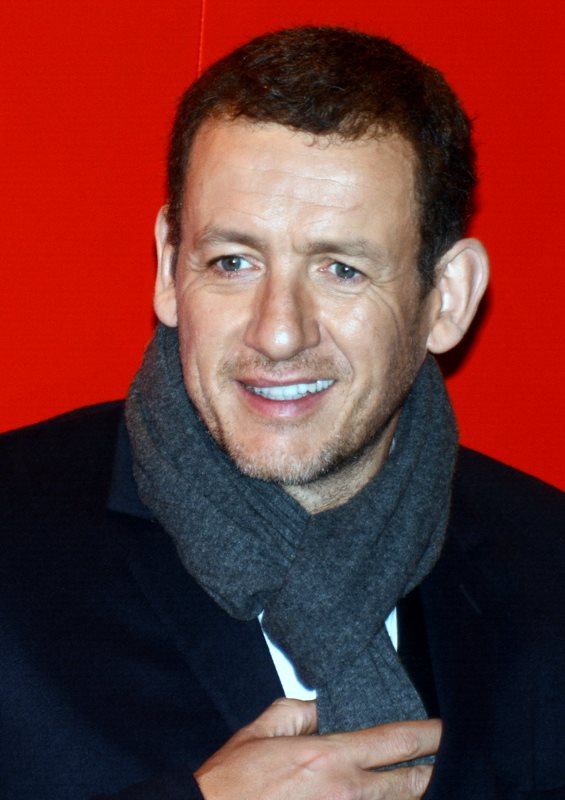
Dany Boon, President of the ceremony.

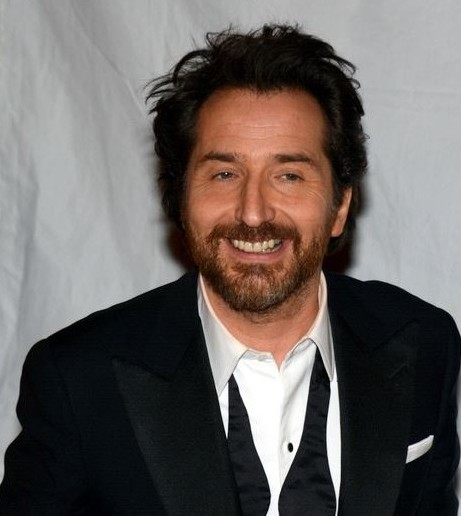
Édouard Baer hosted the ceremony.

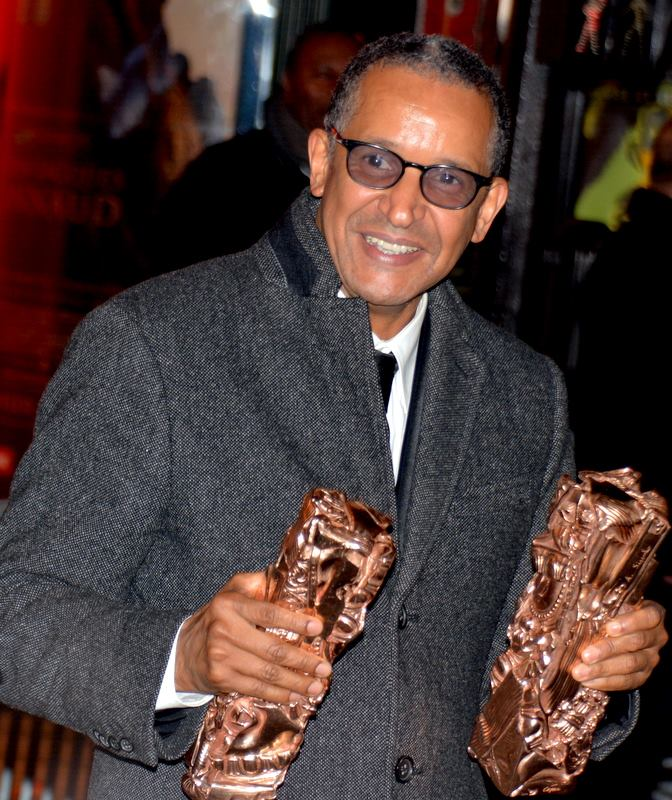
Abderrahmane Sissako, director and writer of Timbuktu, won the César Awards for Best Film, Best Director and Best Original Screenplay.

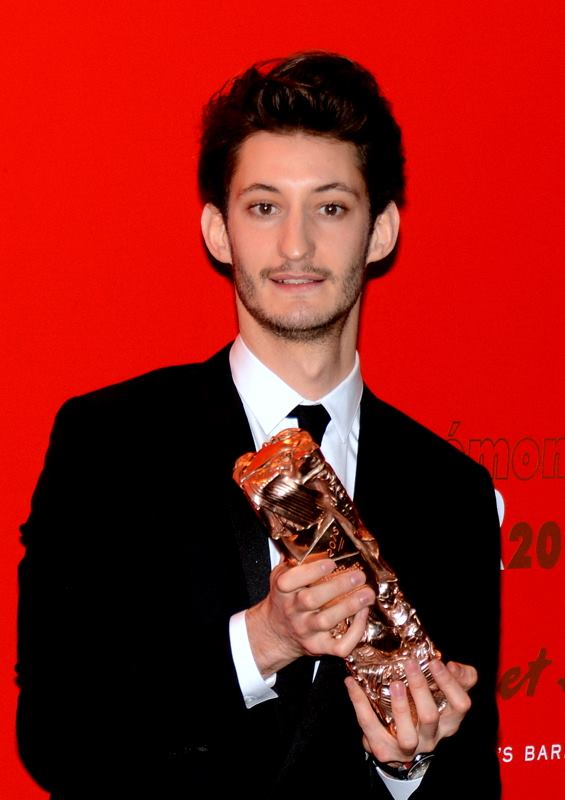
Pierre Niney, Best Actor winner.

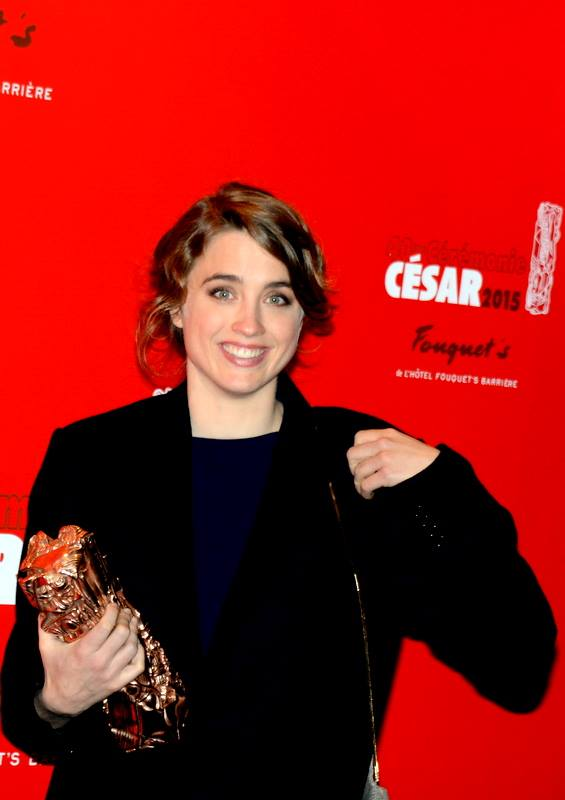
Adèle Haenel, Best Actress winner.

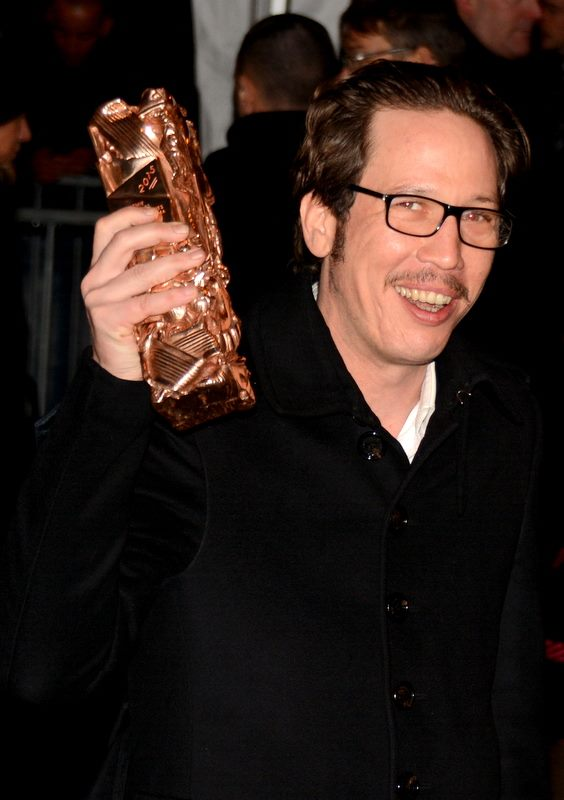
Reda Kateb, Best Supporting Actor winner.

| Best Film Timbuktu: Love at First Fight; Eastern Boys; La Famille Bélier; Hippocrate; Saint Laurent; Clouds of Sils Maria | Best Director Abderrahmane Sissako – Timbuktu: Céline Sciamma – Girlhood; Thomas Cailley – Love at First Fight; Robin Campillo – Eastern Boys; Thomas Lilti – Hippocrate; Bertrand Bonello – Saint Laurent; Olivier Assayas – Clouds of Sils Maria |
| Best Actor Pierre Niney – Yves Saint Laurent as Yves Saint Laurent: Niels Arestrup – Diplomacy as General Dietrich von Choltitz; Guillaume Canet – Next Time I'll Aim for the Heart as Franck; François Damiens – La Famille Bélier as Rodolphe Bélier; Romain Duris – The New Girlfriend as David / Virginia; Vincent Lacoste – Hippocrate as Benjamin Barois; Gaspard Ulliel – Saint Laurent as Yves Saint Laurent | Best Actress Adèle Haenel – Love at First Fight as Madeleine: Juliette Binoche – Clouds of Sils Maria as Maria Enders; Marion Cotillard – Two Days, One Night as Sandra; Catherine Deneuve – In the Courtyard as Mathilde; Émilie Dequenne – Not My Type as Jennifer; Sandrine Kiberlain – Elle l'adore as Muriel Bayen; Karin Viard – La Famille Bélier as Gigi Bélier |
| Best Supporting Actor Reda Kateb – Hippocrate as Abdel Rezzak: Éric Elmosnino – La Famille Bélier as M. Thomasson; Guillaume Gallienne – Yves Saint Laurent as Pierre Bergé; Louis Garrel – Saint Laurent as Jacques de Bascher; Jérémie Renier – Saint Laurent as Pierre Bergé | Best Supporting Actress Kristen Stewart – Clouds of Sils Maria as Valentine: Marianne Denicourt – Hippocrate as Dr. Denormandy; Claude Gensac – Lulu femme nue as Marthe; Izïa Higelin – Samba as Manu; Charlotte Le Bon – Yves Saint Laurent as Victoire Doutreleau |
| Most Promising Actor Kévin Azaïs – Love at First Fight as Arnaud Labrède: Ahmed Dramé – Once in a Lifetime as Malik; Kirill Emelyanov – Eastern Boys as Marek / Rouslan; Pierre Rochefort – Going Away as Baptiste Cambière; Marc Zinga – May Allah Bless France! as Régis / Abd Al Malik | Most Promising Actress Louane Emera – La Famille Bélier as Paula Bélier: Lou de Laâge – Respire as Sarah; Joséphine Japy – Respire as Charlie; Ariane Labed – Fidelio, l'odyssée d'Alice as Alice; Karidja Touré – Girlhood as Marieme / Vic |
| Best Original Screenplay Timbuktu – Abderrahmane Sissako, Kessen Tall: La Famille Bélier – Victoria Bedos, Stanislas Carré de Malberg, Eric Lartigau, Thomas Bidegain; Love at First Fight – Thomas Cailley and Claude Le Pape; Hippocrate – Thomas Lilti, Baya Kasmi, Julien Lilti, Pierre Chosson; Clouds of Sils Maria – Olivier Assayas | Best Adaptation Diplomacy – Cyril Gely, Volker Schlöndorff: The Blue Room – Mathieu Amalric, Stéphanie Cléau; Lulu femme nue – Sólveig Anspach, Jean-Luc Gaget; Not My Type – Lucas Belvaux; Next Time I'll Aim for the Heart – Cédric Anger |
| Best First Feature Film Love at First Fight: Elle l'adore; Fidelio, l'odyssée d'Alice; Party Girl; May Allah Bless France! | Best Cinematography Sofian El Fani – Timbuktu: Christophe Beaucarne – Beauty and the Beast; Josée Deshaies – Saint Laurent; Yorick Le Saux – Clouds of Sils Maria; Thomas Hardmeier – Yves Saint Laurent |
| Best Editing Nadia Ben Rachid – Timbuktu: Lilian Corbeille – Love at First Fight; Christel Dewynter – Hippocrate; Frédéric Baillehaiche – Party Girl; Fabrice Rouaud – Saint Laurent | Best Sound Philippe Welsh, Roman Dymny and Thierry Delor – Timbuktu: Pierre André and Daniel Sobrino – Girlhood; Jean-Jacques Ferran, Nicolas Moreau and Jean-Pierre Laforce – Bird People; Jean-Luc Audy, Guillaume Bouchateau and Niels Barletta – Love at First Fight; Nicolas Cantin, Nicolas Moreau and Jean-Pierre Laforce – Saint Laurent |
| Best Music Written for a Film Amine Bouhafa – Timbuktu: Jean-Baptiste de Laubier – Girlhood; Béatrice Thiriet – Bird People; Lionel Flairs, Benoît Rault and Philippe Deshaies – Love at First Fight; Ibrahim Maalouf – Yves Saint Laurent | Best Costume Design Anaïs Romand – Saint Laurent: Pierre-Yves Gayraud – Beauty and the Beast; Carine Sarfati – The Connection; Pascaline Chavanne – The New Girlfriend; Madeline Fontaine – Yves Saint Laurent |
| Best Production Design Thierry Flamand – Beauty and the Beast: Jean-Philippe Moreaux – The Connection; Katia Wyszkop – Saint Laurent; Sébastien Birchler – Timbuktu; Aline Bonetto – Yves Saint Laurent | Best Documentary Film The Salt of the Earth: Cartoonists - Foot Soldiers of Democracy; Les Chèvres de ma mère; School of Babel; National Gallery |
| Best Animated Feature Film Minuscule: Valley of the Lost Ants: Song of the Sea; Jack and the Cuckoo-Clock Heart | Best Animated Short Film Les Petits Cailloux: Bang Bang!; La Bûche de Noël; Anatole's Little Saucepan |
| Best Short Film La Femme de Rio: Aïssa; Inupiluk; The Days Before; My Sense of Modesty; La Virée à Paname | Best Foreign Film Mommy: 12 Years a Slave; Boyhood; Two Days, One Night; Ida; The Grand Budapest Hotel; Winter Sleep |
Honorary César Sean Penn
Prix Daniel Toscan du Plantier Sylvie Pialat
Académie des Arts et Techniques du Cinéma – Médaille d'Or Luc Besson

== Films with multiple nominations and awards ==
The following films received multiple nominations:

| Nominations | Film |
|---|---|
| 10 | Saint Laurent |
| 9 | Love at First Fight |
| 8 | Timbuktu |
| 7 | Hippocrate |
| 7 | Yves Saint Laurent |
| 6 | La Famille Bélier |
| 6 | Clouds of Sils Maria |
| 4 | Girlhood |
| 3 | Eastern Boys |
| 3 | Beauty and the Beast |
| 2 | Diplomacy |
| 2 | Next Time I'll Aim for the Heart |
| 2 | The New Girlfriend |
| 2 | Two Days, One Night |
| 2 | Not My Type |
| 2 | Elle l'adore |
| 2 | Lulu femme nue |
| 2 | Respire |
| 2 | Fidelio, l'odyssée d'Alice |
| 2 | May Allah Bless France! |
| 2 | Party Girl |
| 2 | Bird People |
| 2 | The Connection |

The following films received multiple awards:

| Awards | Film |
|---|---|
| 7 | Timbuktu |
| 3 | Love at First Fight |

== Presenters ==
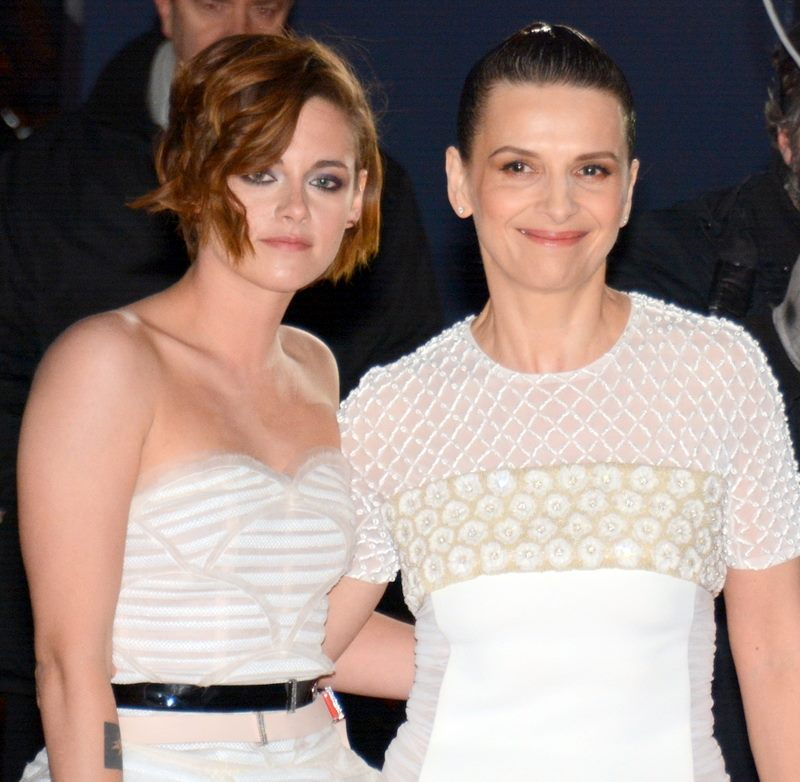
Kristen Stewart (left), Best Supporting Actress winner, and Juliette Binoche, Best Actress nominee, presented the award for Best Actor.

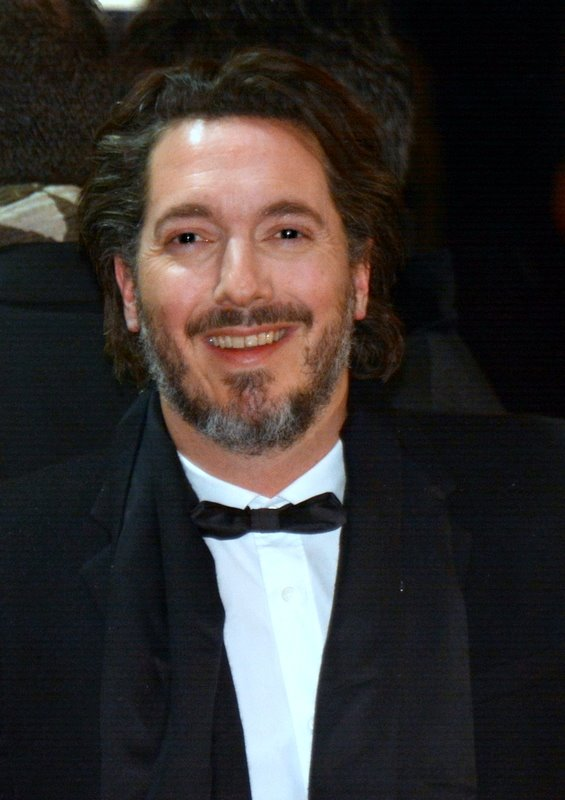
Guillaume Gallienne presented the award for Best Actress.

The following individuals, listed in order of appearance, presented awards at the ceremony.

| Name(s) | Role |
|---|---|
| Cécile de France and Cédric Klapisch | Presenters of the award for Most Promising Actress |
| Alex Lutz and Stéphane De Groodt | Presenters of the awards for Best Cinematography and Best Sound |
| Zabou Breitman and Pierre Deladonchamps | Presenters of the award for Best First Feature Film |
| Leïla Bekhti and Géraldine Nakache | Presenters of the award for Best Supporting Actor |
| Cécile Cassel and Étienne Daho | Presenters of the award for Best Music Written for a Film |
| Laura Smet and Joann Sfar | Presenters of the awards for Best Animated Feature Film & Best Animated Short Film |
| Julie Gayet and Denis Podalydès | Presenters of the award for Most Promising Actor |
| Marilou Berry and Jean-Paul Gaultier | Presenters of the award for Best Costume Design |
| Pascal Elbé | Presenter of the award for Best Original Screenplay |
| Franck Gastambide and Léa Drucker | Presenters of the awards for Best Production Design and Best Editing |
| Charlotte Le Bon and Jalil Lespert | Presenters of the award for Best Documentary Film |
| Marion Cotillard | Presenter of the Honorary César |
| Sabrina Ouazani and Félix Moati | Presenters of the award for Best Short Film |
| Céline Sallette and Joey Starr | Presenters of the award for Best Supporting Actress |
| Nathalie Baye and Guillaume Canet | Presenters of the award for Best Director |
| Emilie Dequenne and Lambert Wilson | Presenters of the award for Best Foreign Film |
| Juliette Binoche and Kristen Stewart | Presenters of the award for Best Actor |
| Sylvie Testud and Abd al Malik | Presenters of the award for Best Adaptation |
| Guillaume Gallienne | Presenter of the award for Best Actress |
| Dany Boon | Presenter of the award for Best Film |

== Viewers ==
The show was followed by 2.3 million viewers. This corresponds to 13.6% of the audience.

== See also ==
- 20th Lumière Awards
- 5th Magritte Awards
- 27th European Film Awards
- 87th Academy Awards
- 68th British Academy Film Awards
- 30th Goya Awards
- 60th David di Donatello
