= 20th Lumière Awards =

2015 French film awards ceremony

- Date: 2 February 2015
- Site: Espace Pierre Cardin, Paris, France
- Hosted by: Estelle Martin and Patrick Fabre

Highlights
- Best Film: Timbuktu
- Best Director: Abderrahmane Sissako
- Best Actor: Gaspard Ulliel
- Best Actress: Karin Viard
- Most awards: Timbuktu, La Famille Bélier and Love at First Fight (2)
- Most nominations: Saint Laurent (5)

The 20th Lumière Awards ceremony, presented by the Académie des Lumières, was held on 2 February 2015, at the Espace Pierre Cardin in Paris. Nominations were announced on 12 January 2015. Saint Laurent garnered the most nominations with a total of five. Timbuktu, La Famille Bélier and Love at First Fight won two awards each.

== Winners and nominees ==
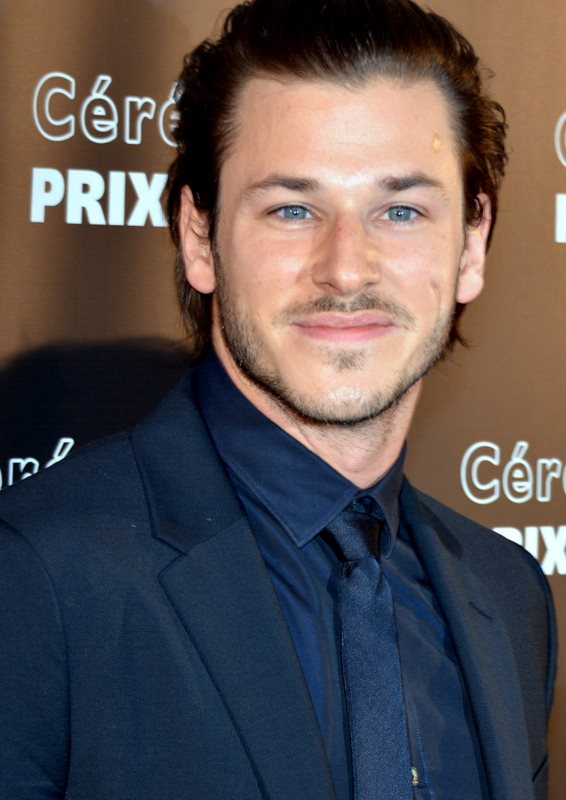
Gaspard Ulliel, Best Actor winner.

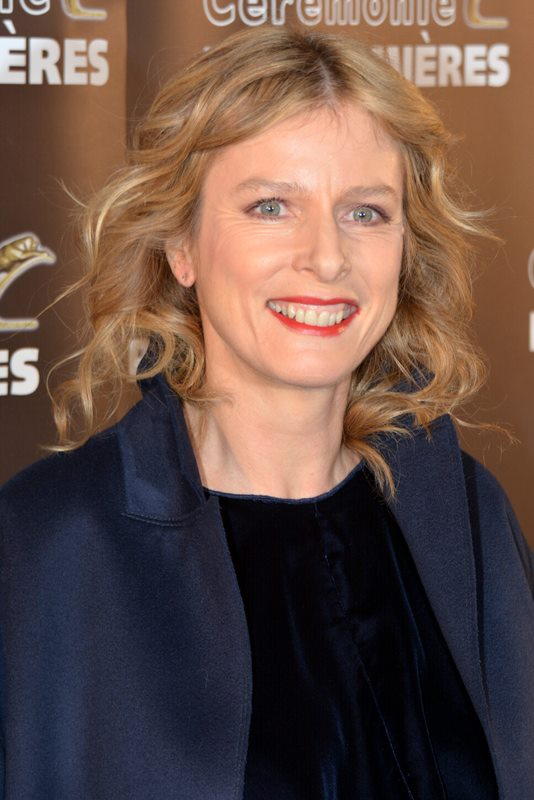
Karin Viard, Best Actress winner.

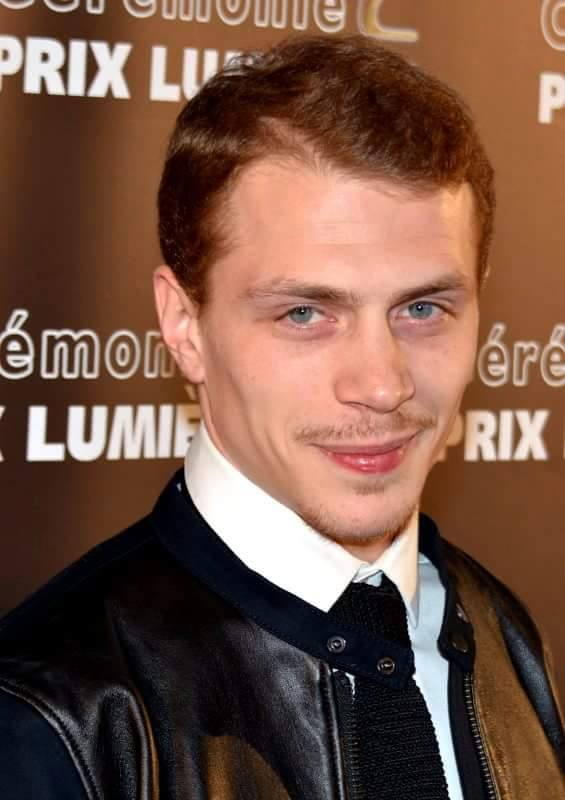
Kévin Azaïs, Best Male Revelation winner.

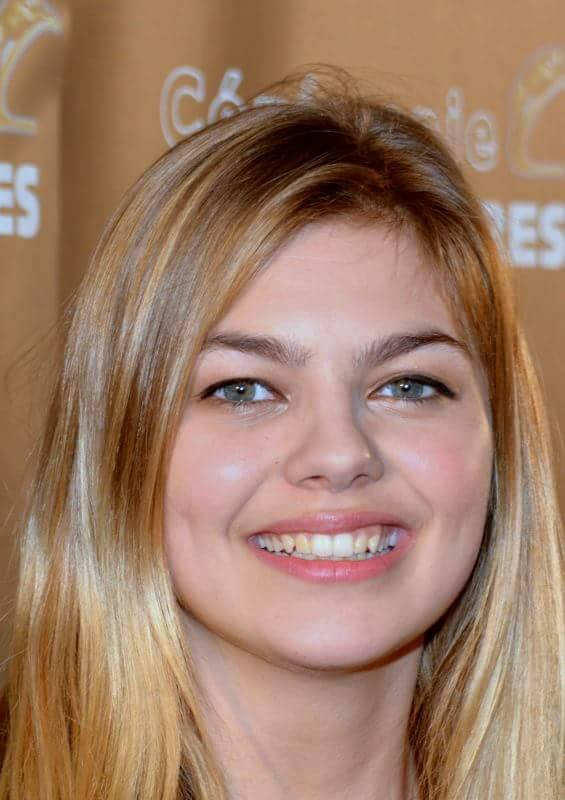
Louane Emera, Best Female Revelation winner.

Best Film	Best Director
Timbuktu: Girlhood; La Famille Bélier; Not My Type; Saint Laurent; Three Hearts	Abderrahmane Sissako — Timbuktu: Lucas Belvaux — Not My Type; Bertrand Bonello — Saint Laurent; Benoît Jacquot — Three Hearts; Cédric Kahn — Wild Life; Céline Sciamma — Girlhood
Best Actor	Best Actress
Gaspard Ulliel — Saint Laurent: Guillaume Canet — Next Time I'll Aim for the Heart & In the Name of My Daughter; Romain Duris — The New Girlfriend; Mathieu Kassovitz — Wild Life; Pierre Niney — Yves Saint Laurent; Benoît Poelvoorde — Three Hearts	Karin Viard — La Famille Bélier & Lulu femme nue: Juliette Binoche — Clouds of Sils Maria; Emilie Dequenne — Not My Type; Charlotte Gainsbourg — Three Hearts & Samba; Adèle Haenel — Love at First Fight & In the Name of My Daughter; Sandrine Kiberlain — Number One Fan
Best Male Revelation	Best Female Revelation
Kévin Azaïs — Love at First Fight: Thomas Blumenthal — La Crème de la crème; Jean-Baptiste Lafarge — La Crème de la crème; Bastien Bouillon — High Society; Didier Michon — Fièvres; Pierre Rochefort — Going Away; Marc Zinga — May Allah Bless France!	Louane Emera — La Famille Bélier: Joséphine Japy — Respire; Lou de Laâge — Respire; Alice Isaaz — La Crème de la crème; Ariane Labed — Fidelio, l'odyssée d'Alice; Karidja Touré — Girlhood; Ana Girardot — High Society & Next Time I'll Aim for the Heart
Best First Film	Best Screenplay
Love at First Fight: Party Girl; Number One Fan; We Did It on a Song; May Allah Bless France!; Fool Circle	Serial (Bad) Weddings — Philippe de Chauveron and Guy Laurent: Hippocrate — Thomas Lilti, Julien Lilti, Baya Kasmi and Pierre Chosson; La French — Audrey Diwan and Cédric Jimenez; Number One Fan — Jeanne Herry and Gaëlle Macé; Saint Laurent — Thomas Bidegain and Bertrand Bonello; La Famille Bélier — Stanislas Carré de Malberg and Victoria Bedos
Best French-Language Film	Best Cinematography
Two Days, One Night: C'est eux les chiens...; Fièvres; L'Oranais; Mommy; Run	Rémy Chevrin — À la vie: Yves Cape — Wild Life; Josée Deshaies — Saint Laurent; Sofian El Fani — Timbuktu; Darius Khondji — Magic in the Moonlight; Arnaud Potier — Respire
Special Jury Prize
Girlhood — Céline Sciamma
Honorary Lumières
Jean-Pierre Mocky

== Films with multiple nominations and awards ==
The following films received multiple nominations:

Nominations	Film
5	Saint Laurent
4	Three Hearts
4	La Famille Bélier
3
3	Timbuktu
3	Love at First Fight
3	Girlhood
3	Not My Type
3	Wild Life
3	Number One Fan
3	Respire
3	La Crème de la crème
2
2	Next Time I'll Aim for the Heart
2	In the Name of My Daughter
2	High Society
2	May Allah Bless France!
2	Fièvres

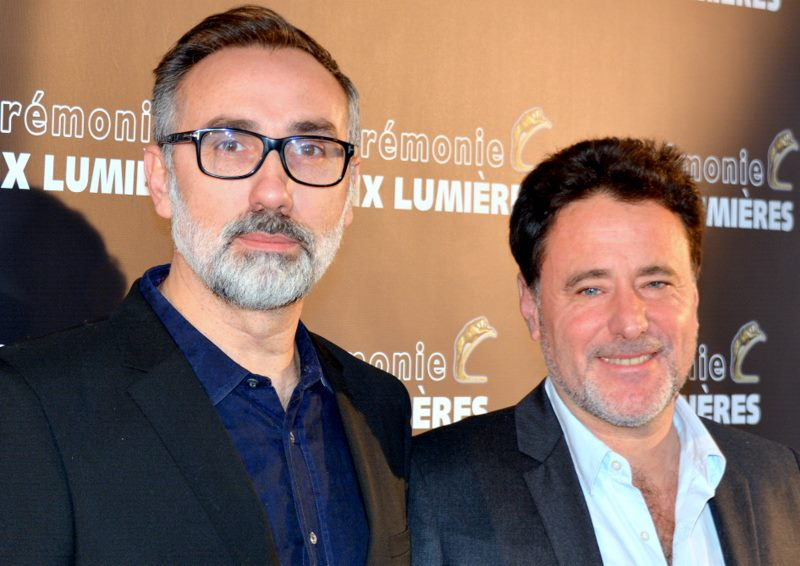
Guy Laurent and Philippe de Chauveron, Best Screenplay winners.

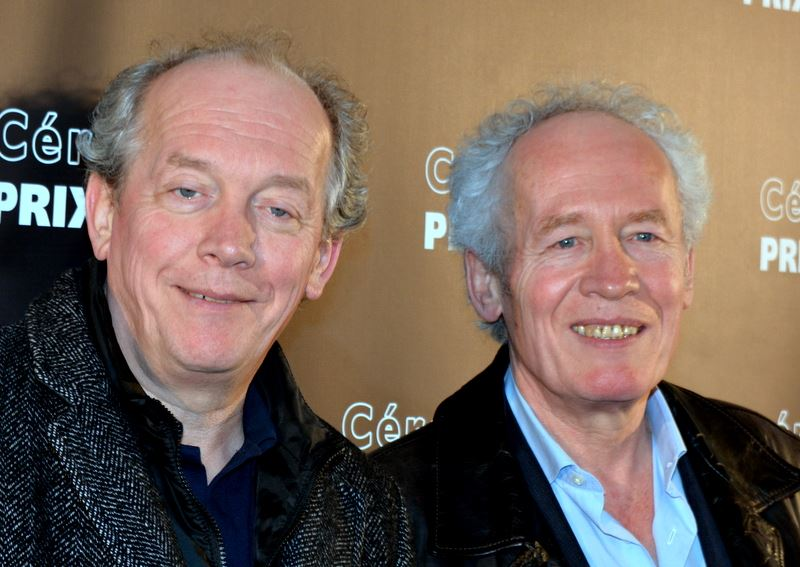
The Dardenne Brothers, directors of the Best French-Language Film winner Two Days, One Night.

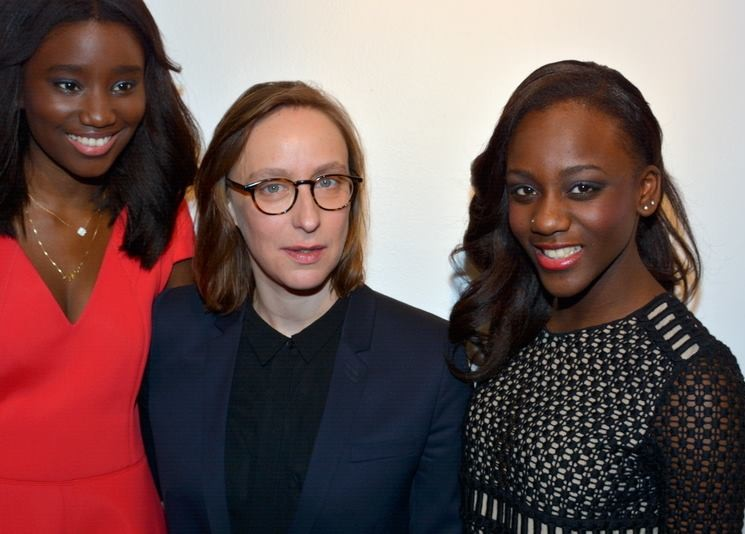
Karidja Touré, Céline Sciamma and Assa Sylla, cast and director of the Special Jury Prize winner Girlhood.

The following films received multiple awards:

Awards	Film
2
2	Timbuktu
2	La Famille Bélier
2	Love at First Fight

== See also ==
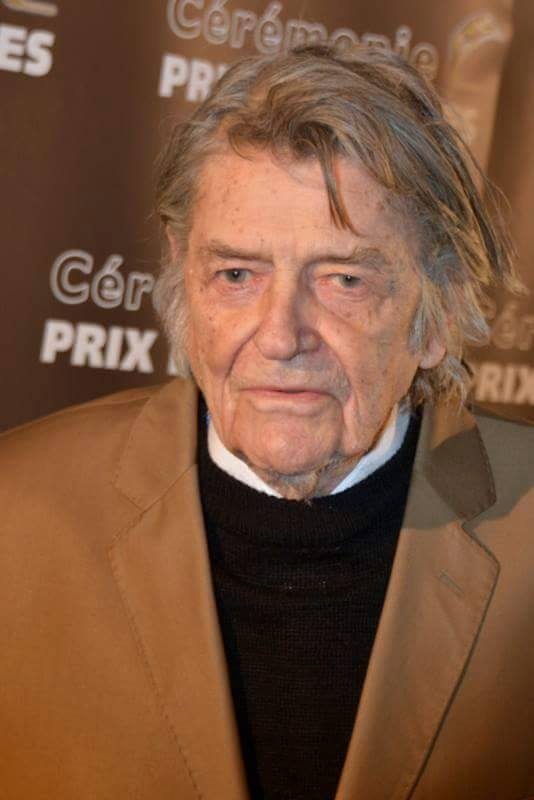
Jean-Pierre Mocky, Honorary Lumière recipient.

- 40th César Awards
- 5th Magritte Awards
