= 2014 Cannes Film Festival =

- Official poster of the 67th Cannes Film Festival featuring a photo of Marcello Mastroianni from Federico Fellini's 1963 film 8½
- Opening film: Grace of Monaco
- Closing film: A Fistful of Dollars
- Location: Cannes, France
- Founded: 1946
- Awards: Palme d'Or: Winter Sleep
- Hosted by: Lambert Wilson
- No. of films: 18 (In Competition)
- Festival date: 14–25 May 2014
- Website: festival-cannes.com/en

Cannes Film Festival
- 2015 2013

The 67th Cannes Film Festival took place from 14 to 25 May 2014. New Zealand filmmaker Jane Campion was the head of the jury for the main competition. Turkish filmmaker Nuri Bilge Ceylan won the Palme d'Or, the festival's top prize, for the drama film Winter Sleep.

The festival poster featured Italian actor Marcello Mastroianni from Federico Fellini's 1963 film 8½, which was presented in the Out of Competition section of the 1963 Cannes Film Festival. French actor Lambert Wilson hosted the opening and closing ceremonies.

Due to European Parliament elections which took place on 25 May 2014, the closing ceremony took place on 24 May.

The festival opened with Grace of Monaco by Olivier Dahan, and closed with a restored 4K version of Sergio Leone's 1964 western A Fistful of Dollars.

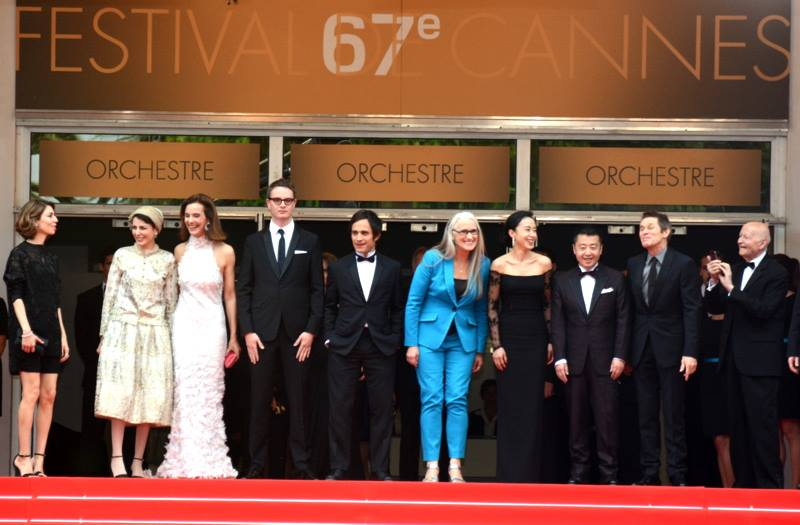
The main competition jury

== Juries ==
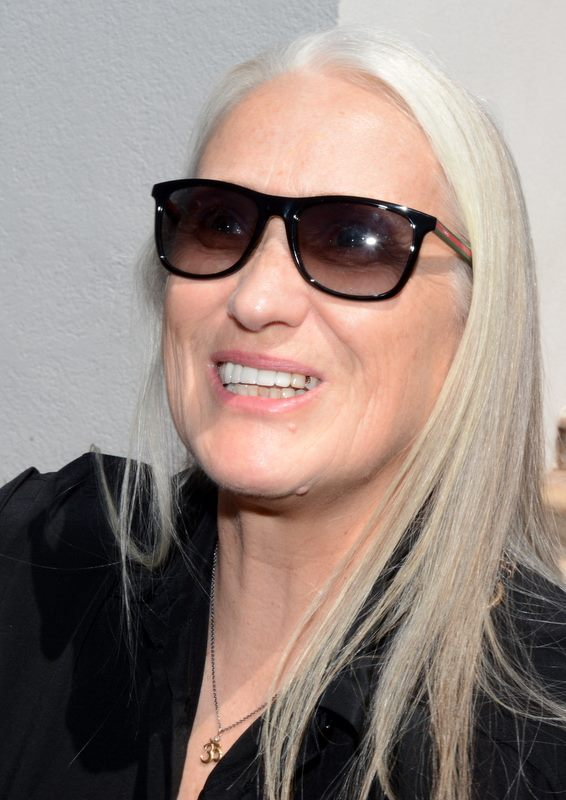
Jane Campion, Main Competition Jury President

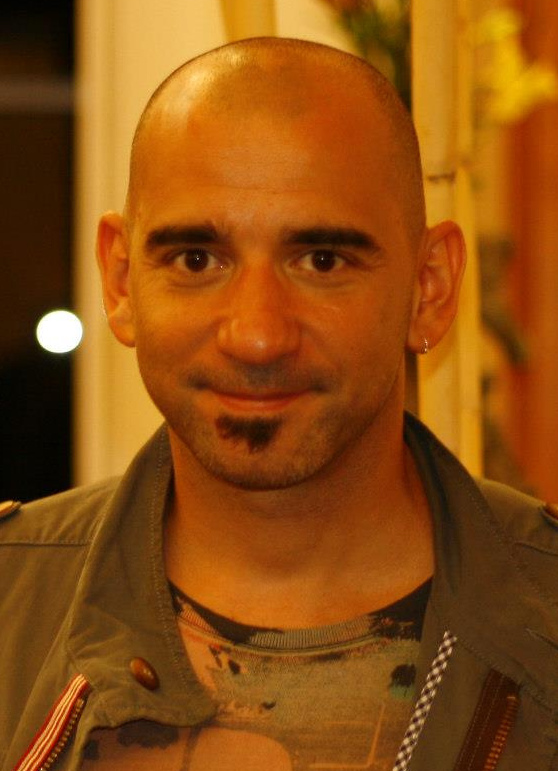
Pablo Trapero, Un Certain Regard Jury President

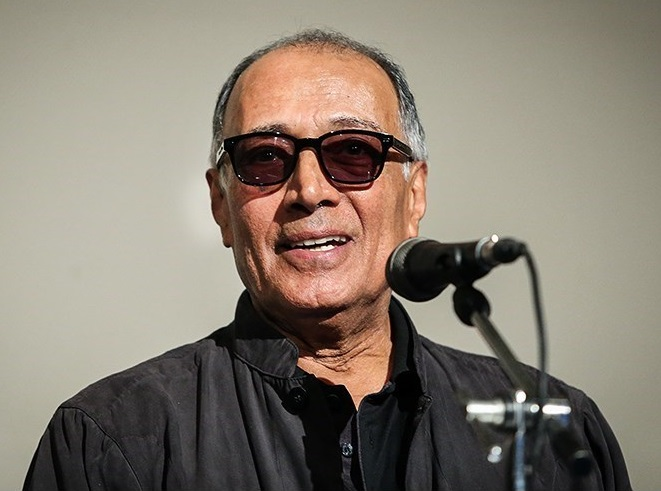
Abbas Kiarostami, Cinéfondation & Short films Jury President

=== Main competition ===
- Jane Campion, New Zealand filmmaker – Jury President
- Gael García Bernal, Mexican actor and filmmaker
- Carole Bouquet, French actress
- Sofia Coppola, American filmmaker
- Willem Dafoe, American actor
- Leila Hatami, Iranian actress
- Jeon Do-yeon, South Korean actress
- Jia Zhangke, Chinese filmmaker
- Nicolas Winding Refn, Danish filmmaker

=== Un Certain Regard ===
- Pablo Trapero, Argentine filmmaker – Jury President
- Peter Becker, American president of The Criterion Collection
- Maria Bonnevie, Norwegian-Swedish actress
- Géraldine Pailhas, French actress
- Moussa Touré, Senegalese filmmaker

=== Caméra d'or ===
- Nicole Garcia, French actress and filmmaker – Jury President
- Richard Anconina, French actor
- Gilles Gaillard, French technician
- Sophie Grassin, French journalist and film critic
- Héléna Klotz, French filmmaker
- Lisa Nesselson, American journalist and film critic
- Philippe Van Leeuw, Belgian filmmaker

=== Cinéfondation and short films ===
- Abbas Kiarostami, Iranian filmmaker – Jury President
- Mahamat Saleh Haroun, Chadian filmmaker
- Noémie Lvovsky, French filmmaker
- Daniela Thomas, Brazilian filmmaker
- Joachim Trier, Norwegian filmmaker

=== Independent juries ===
==== Nespresso Grand Prize (Critics' Week) ====
- Andrea Arnold, English filmmaker – Jury President
- Fernando Ganzo, Spanish film journalist
- Daniela Michele, Mexican film journalist and founding director of the Morelia International Film Festival
- Jordan Mintzer, American film critic
- Jonathan Romney, English film critic

==== Sony CineAlta Discovery Award for Short Film (Critics' Week) ====
- Rebecca Zlotowski, French filmmaker – Jury President
- Benny Dreschel, German film producer
- Tine Fischer, Danish founder and director of the Copenhagen International Documentary Festival (CPH:DOX)
- Pablo Giorgelli, Argentine film director
- Abi Sakamoto, Japanese head of cinema at the French Institute of Japan

==== France 4 Visionary Award (Critics' Week) ====
- Rebecca Zlotowski, French filmmaker – Jury President
- Louise Riousse, French film critic
- Sergio Huidobro, Mexican film critic
- Andrei Rus, Romanian film critic
- Guido Segal, Argentine film critic

==== Queer Palm ====
- Bruce LaBruce, Canadian filmmaker – Jury President
- Anna Margarita Albelo, Cuban-American filmmaker
- João Ferreira, Portuguese artistic director of the Queer Lisboa International Queer Film Festival
- Charlotte Lipinska, French journalist and actress
- Ricky Mastro, Brazilian film festival programmer of Recifest

== Official Selection ==
=== In Competition ===
The following films were selected to compete for the Palme d'Or:

English Title	Original Title	Director(s)	Production Country
The Captive		Atom Egoyan	Canada
Clouds of Sils Maria	Sils Maria	Olivier Assayas	Germany, France, Switzerland
Foxcatcher		Bennett Miller	United States
Goodbye to Language	Adieu au Langage	Jean-Luc Godard	France, Switzerland
The Homesman		Tommy Lee Jones	United States
Jimmy's Hall		Ken Loach	United Kingdom, Ireland, France
Leviathan	Левиафан	Andrey Zvyagintsev	Russia
Maps to the Stars		David Cronenberg	Canada, United States
Mommy		Xavier Dolan	Canada
Mr. Turner		Mike Leigh	United Kingdom
Saint Laurent		Bertrand Bonello	France
The Search		Michel Hazanavicius	France
Still the Water	2つ目の窓	Naomi Kawase	Japan
Timbuktu		Abderrahmane Sissako	Mauritania
Two Days, One Night	Deux jours, une nuit	Jean-Pierre and Luc Dardenne	Belgium, Italy, France
Wild Tales	Relatos Salvajes	Damián Szifron	Argentina, Spain
Winter Sleep	Kış Uykusu	Nuri Bilge Ceylan	Turkey
The Wonders	Le Meraviglie	Alice Rohrwacher	Italy, Switzerland, Germany

=== Un Certain Regard ===
The following films were selected to compete in the Un Certain Regard section:

English Title	Original Title	Director(s)	Production Country
Amour Fou		Jessica Hausner	Austria, Luxembourg, Germany
Bird People		Pascale Ferran	France
The Blue Room	La chambre bleue	Mathieu Amalric	France
Charlie's Country		Rolf de Heer	Australia
Beautiful Youth	Hermosa juventud	Jaime Rosales	Spain, France
The Disappearance of Eleanor Rigby (CdO)		Ned Benson	United States
Fantasia	幻想曲	Wang Chao	China, France
Force Majeure	Turist	Ruben Östlund	Sweden
A Girl at My Door (CdO)	도희야	July Jung	South Korea
Jauja		Lisandro Alonso	Denmark, United States, Argentina
Lost River (CdO)		Ryan Gosling	United States
Misunderstood	Incompresa	Asia Argento	Italy, France
Party Girl (CdO)		Marie Amachoukeli, Claire Burger and Samuel Theis	France
Run (CdO)		Philippe Lacôte	France, Ivory Coast
The Salt of the Earth	Le sel de la terre	Wim Wenders and Juliano Ribeiro Salgado	France, Italy, Brazil
Snow in Paradise (CdO)		Andrew Hulme	United Kingdom
That Lovely Girl	הרחק מהיעדרו	Keren Yedaya	Israel, France
Titli (CdO)		Kanu Behl	India
White God	Fehér isten	Kornél Mundruczó	Hungary, Germany, Sweden
Xenia	Ξενία	Panos H. Koutras	Greece, France, Belgium

(CdO) indicates film eligible for the Caméra d'Or as directorial debut feature.

=== Out of Competition ===
The following films were screened out of competition:

English Title	Original Title	Director(s)	Production Country
Coming Home	歸來	Zhang Yimou	China
How to Train Your Dragon 2		Dean DeBlois	United States
Grace of Monaco (opening film)		Olivier Dahan	United States, France
In the Name of My Daughter	L'homme qu'on aimait trop	André Téchiné	France
Midnight Screenings
The Rover		David Michôd	Australia
The Salvation		Kristian Levring	Denmark
The Target	표적	Chang	South Korea

=== Special Screenings ===
The following films were presented in the Special screenings section:

English Title	Original Title	Director(s)	Production Country
The Ardor	El Ardor	Pablo Fendrik	Argentina, Brazil, France, United States
Bridges of Sarajevo	Les Ponts de Sarajevo	Aida Begić, Isild Le Besco, Leonardo Di Costanzo, Jean-Luc Godard, Kamen Kalev, Sergei Loznitsa, Vincenzo Marra, Ursula Meier, Vladimir Perišić, Cristi Puiu, Marc Recha, Angela Schanelec and Teresa Villaverde	Bulgaria, Germany, Italy, Portugal, Bosnia and Herzegovina, France
Cartoonists – Foot Soldiers of Democracy	Caricaturistes – Fantassins de la démocratie	Stéphanie Valloatto	France
Geronimo	Géronimo	Tony Gatlif	France
Maidan	Майдан	Sergei Loznitsa	Ukraine
Of Men and War	Des hommes et de la guerre	Laurent Bécue-Renard	France, Switzerland
The Owners		Adilkhan Yerzhanov	Kazakhstan
Red Army		Gabe Polsky	United States
Silvered Water, Syria Self-Portrait	ماء الفضة	Ossama Mohammed and Wiam Simav Bedirxan	Syria
70th Anniversary Celebration of Le Monde
People of the World	Les Gens du Monde	Yves Jeuland	France

=== Cinéfondation ===
The Cinéfondation section focuses on films made by students at film schools. The following 16 entries (14 fiction films and 2 animation films) were selected, out of more than 1,631 submissions from 320 different schools. Half of the films selected have been directed by women.

English Title	Original Title	Director(s)	School
The Aftermath of the Inauguration of the Public Toilet at Kilometer 375	ما حدث بعد وضع حجز الأساس لمشروع الحمام بالكيلو 375	Omar El Zohairy	High Cinema Institute, Academy of Arts, Egypt
The Bigger Picture		Daisy Jacobs	National Film and Television School, United Kingdom
Breath	Soom	Hyun Ju Kwon	Chung-Ang University, South Korea
Home Sweet Home		Pierre Clenet, Alejandro Diaz, Romain Mazevet and Stéphane Paccolat	Supinfocom Arles, France
Last Trip Home		Han FengYu	Ngee Ann Polytechnic, Singapore
Moonless Summer	Leto bez meseca	Stefan Ivančić	Faculty of Dramatic Arts, Serbia
Niagara		Chie Hayakawa	ENBU Seminar, Japan
Oh Lucy!		Atsuko Hirayanagi	NYU Tisch School of the Arts Asia, Singapore
Our Blood		Max Chan	Hampshire College, United States
Provincia		György Mór Kárpáti	University of Theatre and Film Arts, Hungary
A Radiant Life	Une vie radieuse	Meryll Hardt	Le Fresnoy, France
Skunk		Annie Silverstein	University of Texas at Austin, United States
Sourdough	Lievito madre	Fulvio Risuleo	Centro Sperimentale di Cinematografia, Italy
Stone Cars		Reinaldo Marcus Green	NYU Tisch School of the Arts, United States
Thunderbirds	Les Oiseaux-Tonnerre	Léa Mysius	La Fémis, France
The Visit		Inbar Horesh	Minshar for Art, School and Center, Israel

=== Short Films Competition ===
Out of 3,450 submissions, the following films were selected to compete for the Short Film Palme d'Or. Italian film A passo d'uomo by Giovanni Aloi was removed from the selection because Aloi broke the regulations for the selection.

English Title	Original Title	Director(s)	Production Country
The Administration of Glory		Ran Huang	China
Aïssa		Clement Tréhin-Lalanne	France
Les corps étrangers		Laura Wandel	Belgium
The Execution	A kivégzés	Petra Szőcs	Hungary, Romania
Happo-en		Masahiko Sato, Takayoshi Ohara, Yutaro Seki, Masayuki Toyota, and Kentaro Hirase	Japan
Invisible Spaces	Ukhilavi Sivrtseebi	Déa Kulumbegashvili	Georgia
The Last One	Sonuncu	Sergey Pikalov	Azerbaijan
Leidi		Simón Mesa Soto	Colombia, United Kingdom
Yes We Love	Ja, vi elsker	Hallvar Witzø	Norway

=== Cannes Classics ===
The line-up for the Cannes Classics section was announced on 4 April 2014. Italian actress Sophia Loren was announced as the guest of honour.

English Title	Original Title	Director(s)	Production Country
Restored Prints
8½ (1963)		Federico Fellini	Italy, France
Blind Chance (1987)	Przypadek	Krzysztof Kieślowski	Poland
Blue Mountains, or Unbelievable Story (1983)	ცისფერი მთები ანუ დაუჯერებელი ამბავი	Eldar Shengelaia	Soviet Union
La Chienne (1931)		Jean Renoir	France
The Color of Pomegranates (1969)	Sayat Nova	Sergei Parajanov	Soviet Union
Cruel Story of Youth (1960)	青春残酷物語	Nagisa Ōshima	Japan
Daybreak (1939)	Le jour se lève	Marcel Carné	France
Dragon Inn (1967)	龍門客棧	King Hu	Taiwan
Fear (1954)	La Paura	Roberto Rossellini	Italy, West Germany
A Fistful of Dollars (1964) (closing film)	Per un pugno di dollari	Sergio Leone	Italy, Spain, West Germany
How Yukong Moved the Mountains (1976)	Regards sur une revolution: Comment Yukong déplaça les montagnes	Joris Ivens and Marceline Loridan	France
Jamaica Inn (1939)		Alfred Hitchcock	United Kingdom
The Last Metro (1980)	Le Dernier Métro	François Truffaut	France
Léolo (1992)		Jean-Claude Lauzon	France, Canada
Lost Horizon (1937)		Frank Capra	United States
Marriage Italian Style (1964)	Matrimonio all'italiana	Vittorio De Sica	Italy, France
A Matter of Resistance (1966)	La vie de château	Jean-Paul Rappeneau	France
Overlord (1975)		Stuart Cooper	United Kingdom
Paris, Texas (1984)		Wim Wenders	West Germany, France, United Kingdom, United States
Tokyo Olympiad (1965)	東京オリンピック	Kon Ichikawa	Japan
Violins at the Ball (1974)	Les violons du bal	Michel Drach	France
Wooden Crosses (1932)	Les croix de bois	Raymond Bernard	France
Tribute
Human Voice	Voce umana	Edoardo Ponti	Italy, United States
Documentaries about Cinema
Life Itself		Steve James	United States
The Go-Go Boys: The Inside Story of Cannon Films		Hilla Medalia	Israel

=== Cinéma de la Plage ===
The Cinéma de la Plage is a part of the Official Selection of the festival. The outdoors screenings at the beach cinema of Cannes are open to the public.

English Title	Original Title	Director(s)	Production Country
8½ (1963)	Otto e mezzo	Federico Fellini	Italy, France
Delusions of Grandeur (1971)	La folie des grandeurs	Gérard Oury	France
For a Few Dollars More (1965)	Per qualche dollaro in più	Sergio Leone	Italy, Spain
The Good, The Bad and The Ugly (1966)	Il buono, il brutto, il cattivo	Sergio Leone	Italy, Spain, West Germany, United States
Polyester (1981)		John Waters	United States
Pulp Fiction (1994)		Quentin Tarantino	United States
Purple Rain (1984)		Albert Magnoli	United States
Seconds (1966)		John Frankenheimer	United States
United Passions (2014)		Frédéric Auburtin	France
The Warriors (1979)		Walter Hill	United States

== Parallel sections ==
=== Critics' Week ===
The line-up for the Critics' Week (Semaine de la Critique) was announced on 21 April at the section's website. FLA by Djinn Carrénard, and Hippocrate by Thomas Lilti, were selected as the opening and closing films of the Semaine de la Critique section.

English title	Original title	Director(s)	Production country
In Competition
Darker Than Midnight (CdO)	Più buio di mezzanotte	Sebastiano Riso	Italy
Gente de bien (CdO)		Franco Lolli	Colombia
Hope		Boris Lojkine	France
It Follows		David Robert Mitchell	United States
Self Made	בורג	Shira Geffen	Israel
The Tribe (CdO)	Плем'я	Myroslav Slaboshpytskyi	Ukraine, Netherlands
When Animals Dream (CdO)	Når dyrene drømmer	Jonas Alexander Amby	Denmark
Special Screenings
Breathe	Respire	Mélanie Laurent	France
FLA (opening film)	Faire: L'amour	Djinn Carrénard	France
Hippocrate (closing film)		Thomas Lilti	France
The Kindergarten Teacher	הגננת	Nadav Lapid	Israel
Short Films Competition
Back Alley	La Contre-allée	Cécile Ducrocq	France
A Blue Room	Un chambre bleue, Niebieski pokój	Tomasz Siwinski	France, Poland
The Chicken		Una Gunjak	Germany, Croatia
Crocodile		Gäelle Denis	United Kingdom
Les Fleuves m'ont Laissée Descendre où je Voulais		Laurie de Lassale	France
Goodnight Cinderella	Boa Noite Cinderela	Carlos Conceição	Portugal
Little Brother	Petit frère	Rémi St-Michel	Canada
Safari		Gerardo Herrero	Spain
True Love Story		Gitanjali Rao	India
Young Lions of Gypsy	A Ciambra	Jonas Carpignano	Italy, France

(CdO) indicates film eligible for the Caméra d'Or as directorial debut feature.

=== Directors' Fortnight ===
The line-up for the Directors' Fortnight was announced on 22 April. Girlhood by Céline Sciamma and Pride by Matthew Warchus, were selected as the opening and closing films of the Directors' Fortnight section.

English title	Original title	Director(s)	Production country
Alleluia		Fabrice Du Welz	Belgium, France
Catch Me Daddy (CdO)		Daniel Wolfe	United Kingdom
Cold in July		Jim Mickle	United States
Eat Your Bones	Mange tes morts	Jean-Charles Hue	France
Gett: The Trial of Viviane Amsalem	גט – המשפט של ויויאן אמסלם	Ronit Elkabetz and Shlomi Elkabetz	Israel, France, Germany
Girlhood (opening film)	Bande de filles	Céline Sciamma	France
A Hard Day	끝까지 간다	Kim Seong-hun	South Korea
Love at First Fight (CdO)	Les combattants	Thomas Cailley	France
National Gallery		Frederick Wiseman	United States, France
Next to Her (CdO)	את לי לילה	Asaf Korman	Israel
Pride (closing film)		Matthew Warchus	United Kingdom
Queen and Country		John Boorman	United Kingdom, Ireland
Refugiado		Diego Lerman	Argentina, France, Germany
The Tale of the Princess Kaguya	かぐや姫の物語	Isao Takahata	Japan
These Final Hours (CdO)		Zak Hilditch	Australia
Whiplash		Damien Chazelle	United States
You're Sleeping Nicole	Tu dors Nicole	Stéphane Lafleur	Canada
Special Screenings
Li'l Quinquin	P'tit Quinquin	Bruno Dumont	France
The Texas Chain Saw Massacre (1974)		Tobe Hooper	United States
Short Films
8 Bullets		Frank Ternier	France
Cambodia 2099		Davy Chou	France
Fragments	Fragmenty	Aga Woszczyńska	Poland
Guy Moquet	Guy Môquet	Demis Herenger	France
Heartless	Sem Coração	Nara Normande and Tião	Brazil
In August	En août	Jenna Hass	Switzerland
It Can Pass Through the Wall	Trece şi prin perete	Radu Jude	Romania
Jutra		Marie-Josée Saint-Pierre	Canada
Man on the Chair		Dahee Jeong	South Korea
The Revolution Hunter	A Caça Revoluções	Margarida Rego	Portugal
Torn		Elmar Imanov, Engin Kundag	Azerbaijan

(CdO) indicates film eligible for the Caméra d'Or as directorial debut feature.

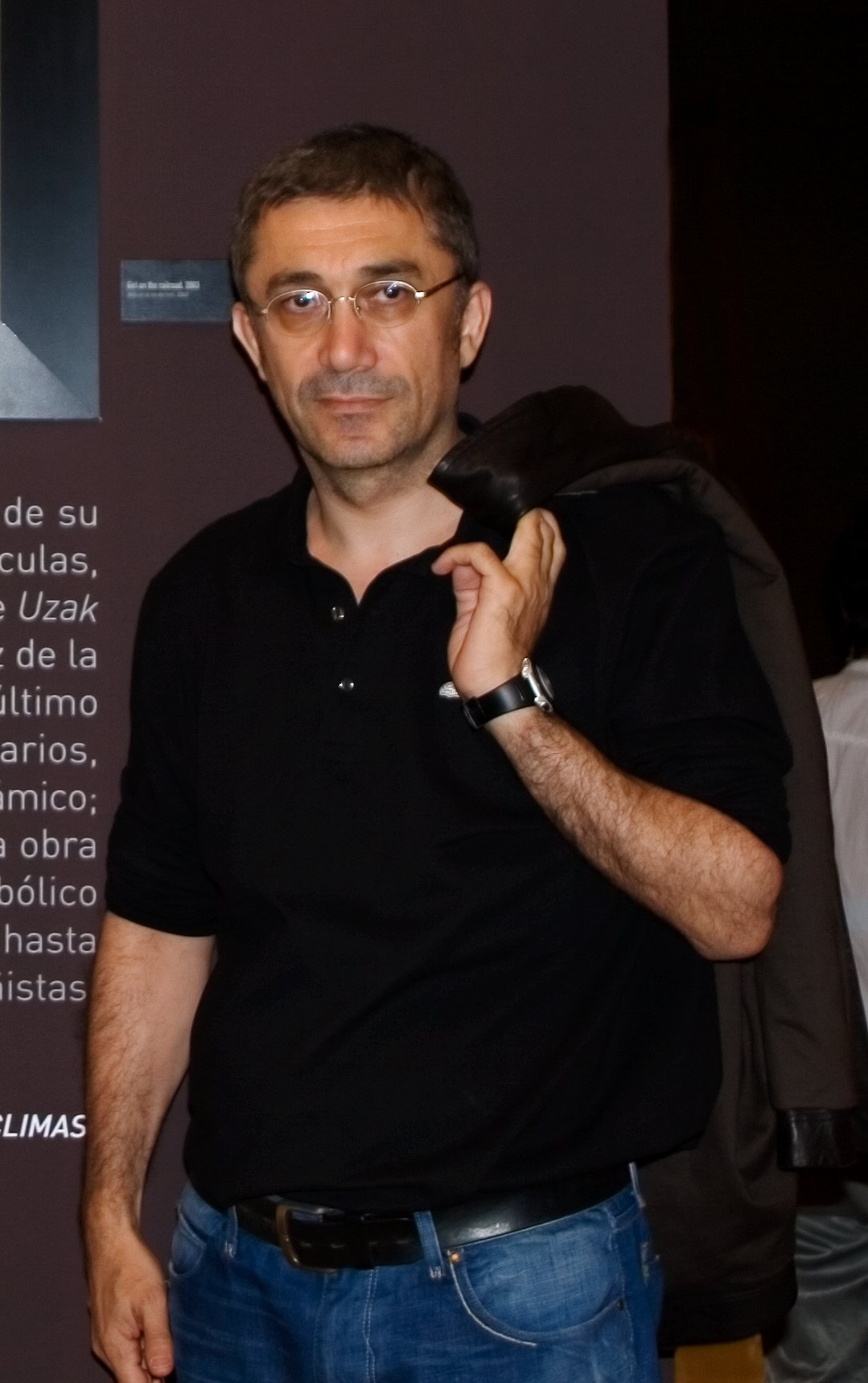
Nuri Bilge Ceylan, winner of the Palme d'Or

== Official Awards ==
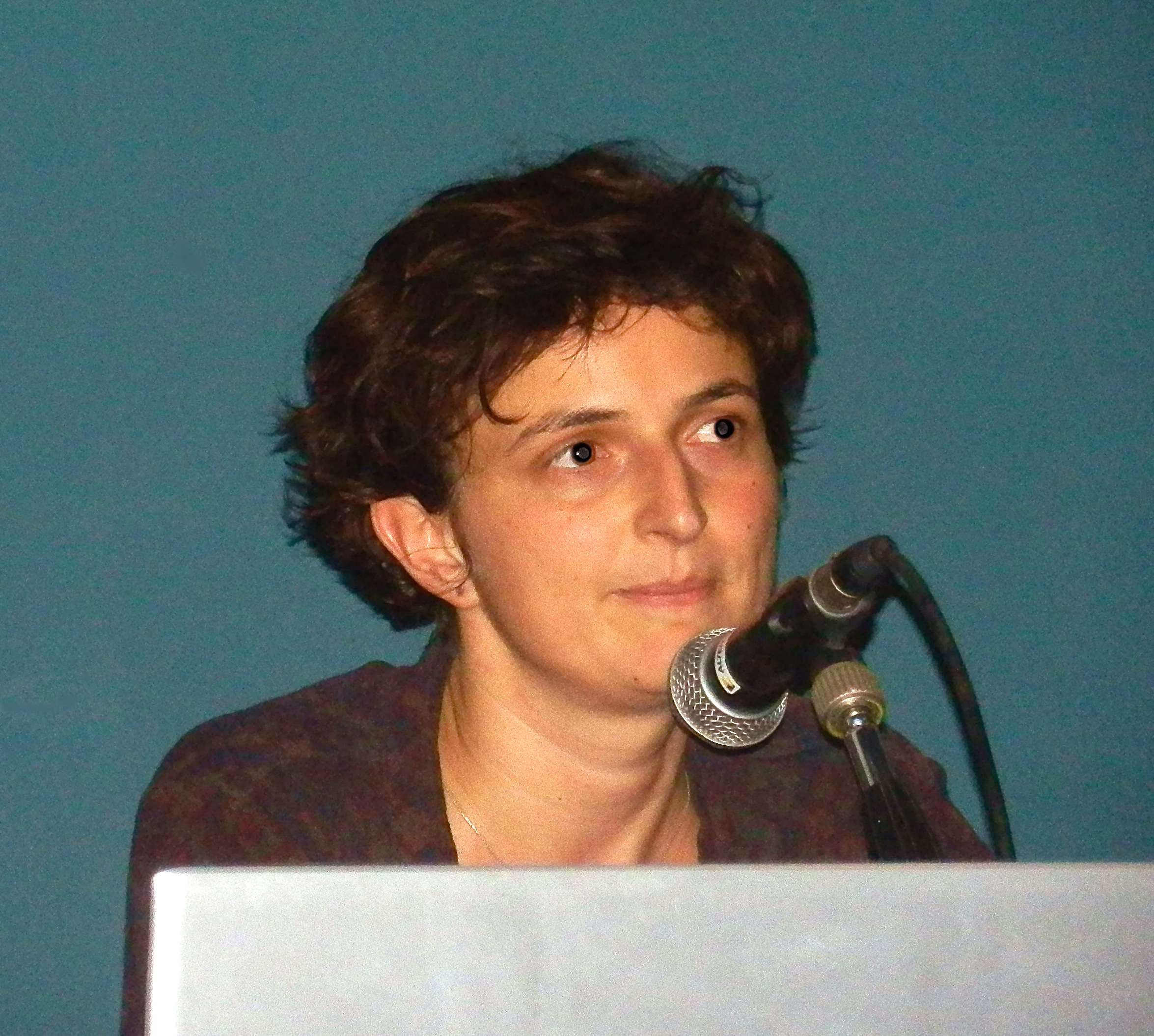
Alice Rohrwacher, winner of the Gran Prix

Winter Sleep became the first Turkish film to win the Palme d'Or since Yol won in 1982. Director Nuri Bilge Ceylan called the win "a great surprise for me" and dedicated the win to the youth of Turkey as the country undergoes political turmoil and to the victims of the Soma mine disaster. Prior to the start of Cannes, Winter Sleep was considered the favorite to win the Palme d'Or, but when it was shown it met with mixed critical reaction. Some found it to be too long (at 3 hours 16 minutes, it was the longest film at the festival) and difficult to finish, while others called it a great revelation. The jury, however, loved the film. Jury president Jane Campion said "If I had the guts to be as honest about his characters as this director is, I'd be very proud of myself."

=== In Competition ===
- Palme d'Or: Winter Sleep by Nuri Bilge Ceylan
- Grand Prix: The Wonders by Alice Rohrwacher
- Best Director: Bennett Miller for Foxcatcher
- Best Screenplay: Andrey Zvyagintsev and Oleg Negin for Leviathan
- Best Actress: Julianne Moore for Maps to the Stars
- Best Actor: Timothy Spall for Mr. Turner
- Jury Prize:
  - Mommy by Xavier Dolan
  - Goodbye to Language by Jean-Luc Godard

=== Un Certain Regard ===
- Prix Un Certain Regard: White God by Kornél Mundruczó
- Un Certain Regard Jury Prize: Force Majeure by Ruben Östlund
- Un Certain Regard Special Prize: The Salt of the Earth by Wim Wenders and Juliano Ribeiro Salgado
- Un Certain Regard Ensemble Prize: The cast of Party Girl
- Un Certain Regard Award for Best Actor: David Gulpilil for Charlie's Country

=== Caméra d'Or ===
- Party Girl by Marie Amachoukeli, Claire Burger and Samuel Theis

=== Cinéfondation ===
- 1st Prize: Skunk by Annie Silverstein
- Second Prize: Oh Lucy! by Atsuko Hirayanagi
- Third Prize:
  - Sourdough by Fulvio Risuleo
  - The Bigger Picture by Daisy Jacobs

=== Short Films Competition ===
- Short Film Palme d'Or: Leidi by Simón Mesa Soto
  - Special Mention:
  - Aïssa by Clément Trehin-Lalanne
  - Yes We Love by Hallvar Witzø

== Independent Awards ==
=== FIPRESCI Prize ===
- Winter Sleep by Nuri Bilge Ceylan (In Competition)
- Jauja by Lisandro Alonso (Un Certain Regard)
- Love at First Fight by Thomas Cailley (Director's Fortnight)

=== Vulcan Award of the Technical Artist ===
- Vulcan Award: Dick Pope for Mr. Turner (cinematography)

=== Prize of the Ecumenical Jury ===
- Timbuktu by Abderrahmane Sissako
  - Special mention:
    - The Salt of the Earth by Wim Wenders & Juliano Ribeiro Salgado
    - Beautiful Youth by Jaime Rosales

=== Critics' Week ===
- Nespresso Grand Prize: The Tribe by Myroslav Slaboshpytskyi
- France 4 Visionary Award: The Tribe by Myroslav Slaboshpytskyi
- SACD Award: Hope by Boris Lojkine
- Sony CineAlta Discovery Award for Short Film: Young Lions of Gypsy by Jonas Carpignano
- Canal+ Award: Crocodile by Gäelle Denis
- Gan Foundation Support for Distribution Award: The Tribe by Myroslav Slaboshpytskiy

=== Directors' Fortnight ===
- Art Cinema Award: Love at First Fight by Thomas Cailley
- SACD Prize: Love at First Fight by Thomas Cailley
- Europa Cinemas Label Award: Love at First Fight by Thomas Cailley
- Illy Prize for Short Film: Heartless by Nara Normande and Tião
  - Special Mention: It Can Pass Through the Wall by Radu Jude

=== Queer Palm ===
- Pride by Matthew Warchus

=== Palm Dog Jury ===
- Palm Dog Award: the canine cast of White God

=== Prix François Chalais ===
- Timbuktu by Abderrahmane Sissako
  - Special mention: The Salt of the Earth by Wim Wenders & Juliano Ribeiro Salgado

=== Cannes Soundtrack Award ===
- Howard Shore for Maps to the Stars
