= Heat Wave (2011 film) =

- Film poster
- Directed by: Jean-Jacques Jauffret
- Written by: Jean-Jacques Jauffret
- Produced by: Antonin Dedet; Nadège Hasson; Jean-Stéphane Sauvaire
- Starring: Adèle Haenel; Sylvie Lachat; Ulysse Grosjean; Yves Ruellan
- Cinematography: Samuel Dravet
- Edited by: Lise Beaulieu
- Production companies: Neon Productions; Explicit Films
- Distributed by: Jour2Fête
- Release dates: 19 May 2011 (Cannes); 12 October 2011 (France)
- Running time: 88 minutes
- Country: France
- Language: French

Heat Wave (French: Après le sud) is a 2011 French drama film and the directorial debut of Jean-Jacques Jauffret. It was screened in the Directors' Fortnight section at the 2011 Cannes Film Festival.

== Cast ==
- Adèle Haenel as Amélie
- Sylvie Lachat as Anne
- Ulysse Grosjean as Luigi
- Yves Ruellan as Georges
- Julien Bodet as Stéphane
