= Adèle Haenel =

French actress (born 1989)

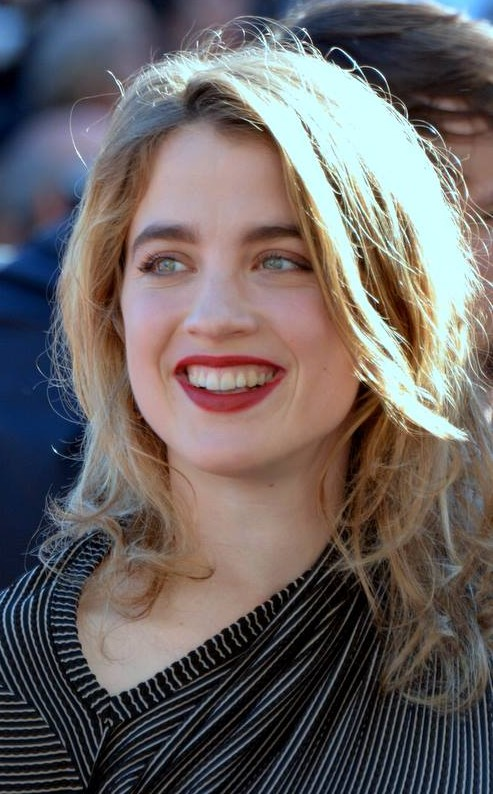
- Haenel at the 2017 Cannes Film Festival
- Born: 11 February 1989 (age 37); Paris, France
- Occupation: Actress / activist
- Years active: 2002–present (Note: Haenel retired from the French film industry in 2023, but she is still active in theatre.)

Adèle Haenel (French: [adɛl enɛl]; born 11 February 1989) is a French actress and political activist. She is the recipient of several accolades, including two César Awards from seven nominations and one Lumière Award from two nominations.

Haenel began her career as a child actress, making her film debut with Les Diables (2002) at the age of 12, and quickly rose to prominence in the French entertainment industry as a teenager. She received her first César Award nomination for her performance in Water Lilies (2007), which also marked the beginning of her long professional and personal relationship with director Céline Sciamma. In 2014, Haenel received her first César Award for Best Supporting Actress for her supporting role in Suzanne, and in 2015 won the César Award for Best Actress for Love at First Fight. She continued to garner recognition for her performances in BPM (Beats per Minute) (2017), The Trouble with You (2018), and Portrait of a Lady on Fire (2019). In 2023, she retired from the film industry in protest against its sexism and patriarchy. She has since focused on stage work and political activism.

== Early life ==
Haenel was born on 11 February 1989 in Paris. Her mother is a teacher and her father a translator. She grew up in Montreuil, Seine-Saint-Denis, in what she has called "a very left-wing, artistic neighborhood". She has Austrian heritage through her father and speaks fluent German. Haenel started acting at age 5 and was involved in local theatre. As a child, she mimicked cartoon characters, particularly those of Tex Avery.

Haenel studied economics and social sciences at the Lycée Montaigne. She had planned to attend HEC Paris and took a preparatory course, but failed the entrance exam. Haenel continued her studies in economics and sociology, eventually receiving a master's degree. She also pursued studies in physics and marine biology.

== Career ==
Haenel made her film debut in 2002 at age 12, playing an autistic girl in Christophe Ruggia's film Les Diables. She had been chosen for the lead role after accompanying her brother to the audition. After Les Diables, Haenel took a five-year break from acting. In 2007, casting director Christel Baras, who had cast her in her film debut, persuaded her to resume her film career, taking the part of a synchronised swimmer in Céline Sciamma's debut feature, Water Lilies. Manohla Dargis of The New York Times highlighted Haenel's performance in an otherwise mixed review of the film, writing that she had "the makings of a real star". For her role in the film, Haenel was nominated for the César Award for Most Promising Actress in 2008. In 2012, she was nominated in the same category for House of Tolerance (2011), a period film directed by Bertrand Bonello, in which she played a prostitute at an upscale Parisian brothel at the turn of the 20th century. She also received the Lumière Award for Most Promising Actress along with her co-stars Céline Sallette and Alice Barnole.

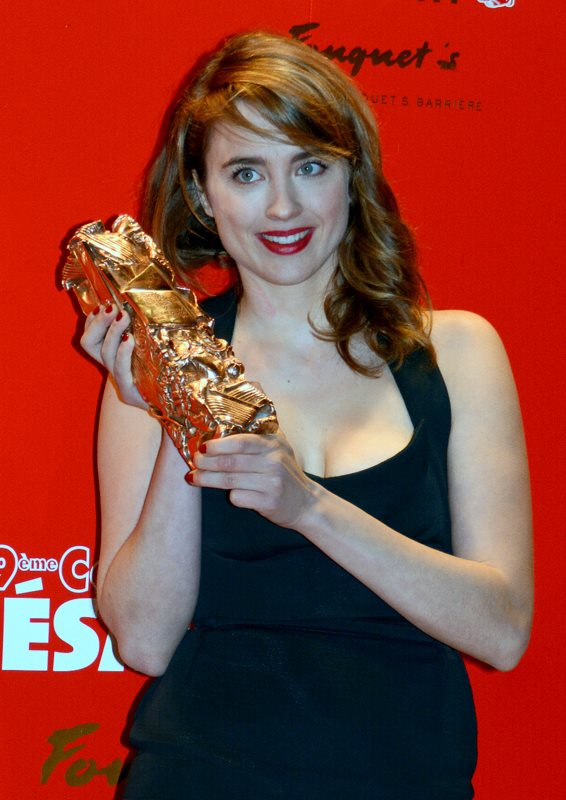
Haenel in 2014, receiving her first César Award for Suzanne

Haenel played one of the two sisters in Katell Quillévéré's Suzanne (2013), for which she received the César Award for Best Supporting Actress. In 2014, Haenel starred in the Thomas Cailley romantic comedy Love at First Fight as Madeleine, a graduate-school dropout and survivalist. She won the César Award for Best Actress for her performance. The same year, Haenel co-starred with Catherine Deneuve in André Téchiné's crime drama In the Name of My Daughter, playing the daughter of a casino owner. Writing for The Village Voice, Melissa Anderson compared her performance to Isabelle Adjani in the 1970s and '80s, and declared her a worthy successor to Deneuve in French cinema. For her roles in both films, Hanael received a Best Actress nomination at the 20th Lumière Awards.

In 2016, Haenel made her German-language debut in the film The Bloom of Yesterday, playing the French descendant of German Holocaust survivors. In the 2017 Robin Campillo film BPM (Beats per Minute), Haenel portrayed Sophie, a headstrong HIV/AIDS activist of the Paris chapter of ACT UP. She received a nomination for the César Award for Best Supporting Actress for her performance.

Haenel starred in the 2018 Pierre Salvadori crime comedy The Trouble with You, playing a widowed detective based on the French Riviera. David Rooney of The Hollywood Reporter said her performance evoked the "classic screwball heroine", a departure from her more serious roles, and complimented the "grace and buoyancy" she brought to the character. She was again nominated for the César Award for Best Actress.

In 2019, Haenel appeared in three films that played at the Cannes Film Festival: Quentin Dupieux's Deerskin, Aude Léa Rapin's Heroes Don't Die, and Sciamma's Portrait of a Lady on Fire. In Portrait of a Lady on Fire, Haenel portrayed Héloïse, a young aristocrat in 18th-century Brittany who is to be married off to a nobleman from Milan. The New Yorker's Richard Brody noted her chemistry with co-star Noémie Merlant and called the two "relentlessly graceful, endowed with physical aplomb, contemplative insight, and strong emotion". A. O. Scott of The New York Times considered Haenel's performance worthy of an Oscar nomination for Best Actress, and Bilge Ebiri of Vulture described the climax of the film (which features Haenel) as "one of the finest pieces of acting and one of the most moving images I've seen in eons." Haenel was nominated for the César Award for Best Actress for her performance, her seventh César nomination.

Since 2019, Haenel and co-star Ruth Vega Fernandez have prepared to perform director Gisèle Vienne's adaptation of Robert Walser's L'Etang (The Pond) for theatres in France and Switzerland. After performances were repeatedly delayed or canceled by restrictions necessitated by the COVID-19 pandemic, the play premiered at the Théâtre Vidy-Lausanne in Switzerland in May 2021.

=== Retirement from the film industry ===
In May 2022, during an interview for German magazine FAQ, Haenel said that she was stepping away from film acting as "I tried to change something from within. [...] I don't want to be part of that anymore”. She said the industry defended "a capitalist, patriarchal, racist, sexist world of structural inequality. This means that this industry works hand in hand with the global economic order, in which all lives are not equal". Haenel's last project was to be The Empire, written and directed by Bruno Dumont, but she explained that she left the film as "it was a dark, sexist and racist world that was defended. The script was full of jokes about cancel culture and sexual violence. I tried to discuss it with Dumont, because I thought a dialogue was possible. I wanted to believe for the umpteenth time that it was not intentional. But it's intentional. [...] Just as they make fun of the victims, of people in a situation of weakness. The intention was to make a sci-fi film with an all-white cast – and therefore a racist narrative. I didn't want to support this." Haenel said she was focused on theatre.

In May 2023, Haenel announced her retirement from the film industry in a letter published in French magazine Télérama, citing "complacency" over those accused of being sexual predators, including Gérard Depardieu, Roman Polanski and Dominique Boutonnat. She has since appeared in experimental theatre.

== Political stance ==
Since retiring from acting, Haenel has been mostly known for her far-left, socialist, feminist, LGBT+, and anti-racist political positions, as well as her involvement in social justice causes. She believes that discrimination is intertwined with the framework of bourgeois and patriarchal systems, leading to gender violence, gender discrimination, and racism, especially in the academic and artistic fields she has distanced herself from. Haenel advocates an alternative model in theater creation and is dedicated to opposing gender violence and sexual assault against women and young girls. She connects these issues to the fundamental concerns of Marxist radical feminism and actively participates in discussions on police violence, anti-colonialism, environmentalism, and the Israeli-Palestinian conflict.

During the 2022 French presidential election, Haenel publicly supported the socialist party "Permanent Revolution" and participated in the campaign of the party's candidate, Anasse Kazib, who failed to obtain enough nominations to qualify for the election. Subsequently, she attended several meetings of the party. In May 2022, she declared herself a supporter of anti-capitalism: initially focusing on feminist issues, she views these systems as interconnected, as "liberation cannot be achieved within the framework of capitalism."

In September 2025, Haenel announced that she would join the Global Sumud Flotilla from Tunis to the Gaza Strip, with aim of delivering food and medicine to Gaza. Haenel also denounced the ongoing famine which she claimed was perpetrated by Israel, and emphasised what she characterized as the need to act "peacefully to open a humanitarian corridor and break the illegal blockade imposed by the Israeli state on Gaza".

== Personal life ==
In 2014, Haenel came out as a lesbian during her César award acceptance speech and acknowledged her relationship with director Céline Sciamma, whom she met in 2007 on the set of Water Lilies. The couple amicably split in 2018, before they began work on Portrait of a Lady on Fire. Haenel and Sciamma have remained close.

Haenel identifies as a feminist. She is a prominent face of France's #MeToo movement, and was the first prominent actress to speak publicly about abuse in the French film industry. In a November 2019 Mediapart interview, Haenel accused director Christophe Ruggia of sexually harassing her from the time she was 12 to 15 after casting her in his film Les Diables. Following the experience, she considered abandoning acting altogether. Haenel's account was backed up by many people who had worked on the film and noted Ruggia's inappropriate behaviour towards her, along with letters he wrote her at the time proclaiming his love for her. As a result, Ruggia was expelled from the Société des réalisateurs de films, the French directors' guild. Though Haenel deliberately chose not to go to the police with her accusations, citing the justice system as "usually condemning so few sexual offenders" and "only one rape out of a hundred" and saying, "the justice ignores us, we ignore the justice", the publicity her interviews brought to the abuse led the Paris prosecutor's office to announce it was investigating Ruggia. Haenel later changed her mind about working with the police and officially filed a complaint against Ruggia in November 2019. In January 2020, the police charged Ruggia with "sexual assaults on a 15-year-old minor by a person having authority." In February 2025, Ruggia was convicted of sexually assaulting Haenel as a minor and sentenced to two years in prison suspended; he was also required to wear an electronic monitor for two years of house arrest.

On 28 February 2020, Haenel, Céline Sciamma, Noémie Merlant, and Aïssa Maïga walked out of the 45th César Awards ceremony after Roman Polanski, who was convicted of raping thirteen-year old Samantha Geimer in 1977, won the award for Best Director for his film An Officer and a Spy. As Haenel left, she waved her fist and shouted "La honte!" ("Shame!"), and after exiting the auditorium, she was filmed clapping sarcastically and shouting "Bravo la pédophilie!" ("Bravo, paedophilia!").

== Filmography ==
| Year | Title | Role | Notes |
|---|---|---|---|
| 2002 | Les Diables | Chloé | |
| 2007 | Le bel esprit | | Short film |
| 2008 | Water Lilies | Floriane | |
| 2009 | Déchaînées | Lucie | Television film |
| 2009 | Les Grandes Forêts | Lise | Short film |
| 2010 | Adieu Molitor | La copine de Paulin | Short film |
| 2010 | Pauline | | Short film |
| 2011 | Une heure avec Alice | Alice | Short film |
| 2011 | Les Enfantants de la Nuit | Heriette | Short film |
| 2011 | Iris in Bloom | Isabelle | |
| 2011 | House of Tolerance | Léa | |
| 2011 | Heat Wave | Amélie | |
| 2011 | Goldman | Jeanne | Television film |
| 2012 | Folks | | Short film |
| 2012 | Aliyah | Jeanne | |
| 2012 | Three Worlds | Marion Testard | |
| 2012 | La Mouette | Macha | Television film |
| 2013 | Suzanne | Maria | |
| 2014 | Love at First Fight | Madeleine | |
| 2014 | In the Name of My Daughter | Agnès Le Roux | |
| 2014 | Truffaut au présent: Actrices | | Short film |
| 2015 | The Forbidden Room | The Mute Invalid | |
| 2015 | Les Ogres | Mona | |
| 2016 | Seances | | |
| 2016 | The Unknown Girl | Dr. Jenny Davin | |
| 2016 | Nocturama | Girl with a bike | |
| 2016 | Orphan | Renée | |
| 2016 | The Bloom of Yesterday | Zazie | |
| 2017 | BPM (Beats per Minute) | Sophie | |
| 2018 | The Trouble With You | Yvonne | |
| 2018 | One Nation, One King | Françoise | |
| 2019 | Deerskin | Denise | |
| 2019 | Heroes Don't Die | Alice | |
| 2019 | Portrait of a Lady on Fire | Héloïse | |

== Theatre ==
| Year | Production | Director | Venue |
|---|---|---|---|
| 2012 | The Seagull | Arthur Nauzyciel | Festival d'Avignon |
| 2013 | Le Moche / Voir Clair / Perplexe | Maïa Sandoz | Théâtre La Générale, Paris |
| 2016 | Old Times | Benoît Giros | Théâtre de l'Atelier |
| 2016 | The Ritual Slaughter of Gorge Mastromas | Maïa Sandoz | CDN d'Orléans |
| 2018 | Zaï Zaï Zaï Zaï | Paul Moulin | Ferme du Buisson |
| 2021 | L'Etang (The Pond) | Gisèle Vienne | Théâtre Vidy-Lausanne (premiere; various venues in Europe thereafter) |
| 2022 | Le Voyage sans Fin (Monique Wittig) | mise en scène Adèle Haenel et Gisèle Vienne | Maison de la Poésie, Paris |
| 2023 | EXTRA LIFE | Gisèle Vienne | premiere at Ruhrtriennale Festival der Künste 2023 |

== Bibliography ==
=== Essays ===
- Dorlin, Elsa, ed. (2021). Feu! Abécédaire des féminismes présents. France: Éditions Libertalia. ISBN 9782377292233.
- Le Taillandier, Agathe, ed. (2021). Une bibliothèque féministe. France: Groupe Margot. ISBN 9782378802639.

== Awards and nominations ==
| Year | Award | Category | Nominated work | Result | Ref |
|---|---|---|---|---|---|
| 2008 | César Awards | Most Promising Actress | Water Lilies | Nominated | |
| 2012 | Berlin International Film Festival | Shooting Stars Award | —N/a | Won | |
| 2012 | Lumière Awards | Most Promising Actress | House of Tolerance | Won | |
| 2012 | César Awards | Most Promising Actress | House of Tolerance | Nominated | |
| 2014 | César Awards | Best Supporting Actress | Suzanne | Won | |
| 2014 | Prix Suzanne Bianchetti | —N/a | —N/a | Won | |
| 2015 | César Awards | Best Actress | Love at First Fight | Won | |
| 2015 | Cairo International Film Festival | Best Actress | Love at First Fight | Won | |
| 2015 | Lumière Awards | Best Actress | Love at First Fight | Nominated | |
| 2015 | Lumière Awards | Best Actress | In the Name of My Daughter | Nominated | |
| 2015 | Prix Romy Schneider | —N/a | —N/a | Won | |
| 2015 | Globes de Cristal Awards | Best Actress | Love at First Fight | Nominated | |
| 2016 | Festival International du Film Francophone de Namur | Best Actress | Orphan | Won | |
| 2018 | César Awards | Best Supporting Actress | BPM (Beats per Minute) | Nominated | |
| 2019 | César Awards | Best Actress | The Trouble with You | Nominated | |
| 2019 | Globe de Cristal Awards | Best Actress – Comedy | The Trouble with You | Nominated | |
| 2019 | European Film Awards | Best Actress | Portrait of a Lady on Fire | Nominated | |
| 2019 | IndieWire Critics Poll | Best Actress | Portrait of a Lady on Fire | 10th Place | |
| 2019 | IndieWire Critics Poll | Best Supporting Actress | Portrait of a Lady on Fire | 13th Place | |
| 2019 | Austin Film Critics Association | Best Supporting Actress | Portrait of a Lady on Fire | Nominated | |
| 2020 | César Awards | Best Actress | Portrait of a Lady on Fire | Nominated | |
