= Fidelio: Alice's Odyssey =

- Film poster
- Directed by: Lucie Borleteau
- Written by: Lucie Borleteau; Clara Bourreau; Mathilde Boisseleau
- Produced by: Pascal Caucheteux; Marine Arrighi de Casanova; Olivier Père
- Starring: Ariane Labed; Melvil Poupaud; Anders Danielsen Lie
- Cinematography: Simon Beaufils
- Edited by: Guy Lecorne
- Music by: Thomas De Pourquery
- Production companies: Why Not Productions; Apsara Films; Arte France Cinéma
- Distributed by: Pyramide Distribution
- Release dates: 29 August 2014 (Locarno Film Festival); 24 December 2014
- Running time: 97 minutes
- Country: France
- Languages: French; Romanian; English; Tagalog; Norwegian
- Budget: $4 million
- Box office: $440,000

Fidelio: Alice's Odyssey (French: Fidelio, l'odyssée d'Alice), also titled Fidelio: Alice's Journey, is a 2014 French drama film directed by Lucie Borleteau.

== Cast ==
- Ariane Labed as Alice
- Melvil Poupaud as Gaël
- Anders Danielsen Lie as Felix
- Pascal Tagnati as Antoine
- Jean-Louis Coulloc'h as Barbereau
- Nathanaël Maïni as Frédéric
- Bogdan Zamfir as Vali
- Corneliu Dragomirescu as Constantin
- Manuel Ramirez as Felizardo
- Laure Calamy as Nadine Legall
- Jan Privat as Patrick Legall
- Luc Catania as Patrick Legall (voice)

== Accolades ==
Award / Film Festival	Category	Recipients and nominees	Result
40th César Awards	Most Promising Actress	Ariane Labed	Nominated
40th César Awards	Best First Feature Film		Nominated
Les Arcs Film Festival	Press Prize		Won
Les Arcs Film Festival	Women in Film Prize	Lucie Borleteau	Won
Locarno International Film Festival	Best Actress	Ariane Labed	Won
Locarno International Film Festival	Europa Cinemas Label Award		Won
20th Lumière Awards	Best Female Revelation	Ariane Labed	Nominated
