= The Blue Room (2014 film) =

2014 film

- Film poster
- Directed by: Mathieu Amalric
- Screenplay by: Mathieu Amalric; Stéphanie Cléau
- Based on: The Blue Room by Georges Simenon
- Produced by: Paulo Branco
- Starring: Léa Drucker; Mathieu Amalric; Stéphanie Cléau; Laurent Poitrenaux; Serge Bozon; Blutch
- Cinematography: Christophe Beaucarne
- Edited by: François Gédigier
- Music by: Grégoire Hetzel
- Distributed by: Alfama Films
- Release dates: 16 May 2014 (Cannes); 16 May 2014 (France)
- Running time: 76 minutes
- Country: France
- Language: French
- Budget: $1.2 million
- Box office: $1.1 million

The Blue Room (French: La Chambre bleue, pronounced [la ʃɑ̃bʁ blø]) is a 2014 French erotic thriller film directed by and starring Mathieu Amalric. It is based on a novel by Georges Simenon. It was screened in the Un Certain Regard section at the 2014 Cannes Film Festival.

== Plot ==
Julien is a farming machine rep married to Delphine, and together they share daughter Suzanne.

At the local pharmacy, Julien reconnects with Esther Despierre, with whom he was acquainted in school. Her husband Nicolas is seriously ill, including recurring seizures, and lives full time in the hospital. Julien and Esther embark on a passionate affair, irregularly meeting in the blue room of a local hotel. One day, Esther asks Julien if he could see himself being with her forever, and he says yes.

After nearly being caught by Nicolas, Julien ceases contact with Esther for months. He receives letters from her with short notes, which he perceives as increasingly menacing.

Julien learns that Nicolas has died. Though Nicolas had a poor prognosis, Julien suspects his death was not natural. Julien soon receives a further letter from Esther that simply reads "À toi!". Shocked, he burns the letter and disposes of it in a nearby canal, as he had all of the others.

Some time later, Delphine asks Julien to travel to the pharmacy to pick up a prescription for Suzanne. There, Julien sees Esther, who fills the prescription and also hands over a box of plum jam Delphine regularly receives from the other pharmacy rep, Nicolas' mother. Julien delivers the jam home and departs for a work appointment. When he returns, he finds his home full of police and his wife dead — seemingly from poisoned plum jam. Julien is immediately arrested.

During the investigation into Delphine's death, police determine Julien made a pit stop on the way home to pick up a FedEx package after obtaining Suzanne's prescription and the box of plum jam. Eyewitnesses from the FedEx facility claim he spent as long as 10 minutes in a remote area of the parking lot between picking up his package and driving home, and prosecutors argue that during this time Julien secretly poisoned the jam. Both Julien and Esther are sentenced to life imprisonment over the deaths of Nicolas and Delphine. Leaving the blue courtroom, Esther smiles at Julian, stating, "See, Julien, they haven't parted us."

== Cast ==
- Mathieu Amalric as Julien Gahyde
- Léa Drucker as Delphine Gahyde
- Stéphanie Cléau as Esther Despierre
- Laurent Poitrenaux as The judge
- Serge Bozon as The cop
- Blutch as The psy
- Mona Jaffart as Suzanne Gahyde
- Véronique Alain as Nicolas's mother
- Paul Kramer as Julien's lawyer
- Alain Fraitag as Esther's lawyer

== Critical response ==
On Rotten Tomatoes, the film holds an approval rating of 88%, based on 76 reviews, with an average rating of 7/10. The site's critical consensus reads, "The Blue Room proves a sobering study of the dark side of human nature, as well as a coolly assured directorial effort from star and co-writer Mathieu Amalric." On Metacritic the film has a score of 72 out of 100, based on 25 critics, indicating "generally favorable reviews".

== Accolades ==
Award / Film Festival	Category	Recipients and nominees	Result
Cannes Film Festival	Prix Un certain regard		Nominated
César Awards	Best Adaptation	Mathieu Amalric and Stéphanie Cléau	Nominated
Mar del Plata International Film Festival	Best Director	Mathieu Amalric	Won

== See also ==
- The Blue Room (2002)
