= Jenna Thiam =

Belgian actress (born 1990)

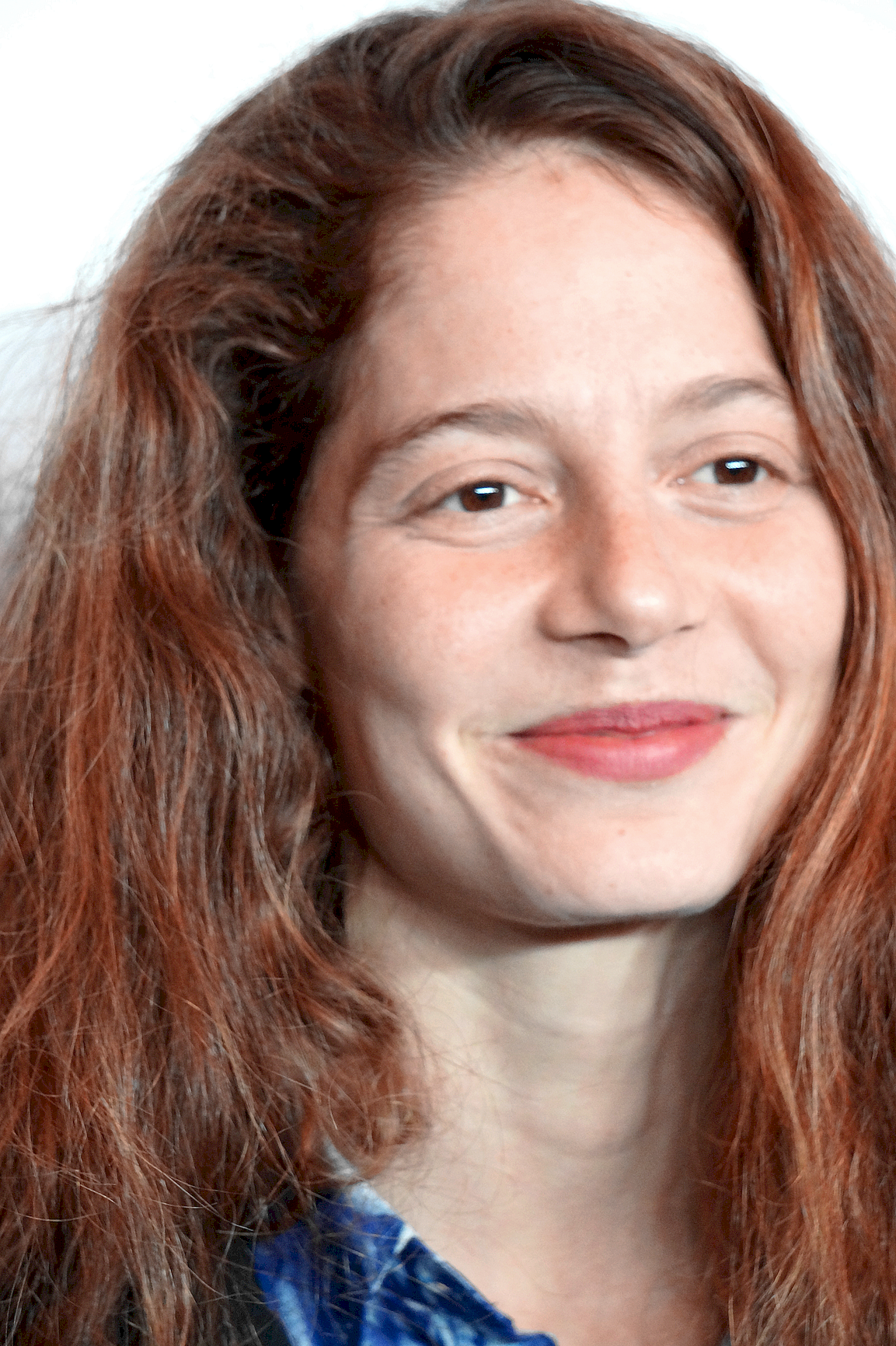
- Born: 19 December 1990 (age 35); Brussels, Belgium
- Occupation: Actress
- Years active: 2009–present
- Spouse: Salvador Sobral (m. 2018)

Jenna Thiam (born 19 December 1990) is a Belgian actress. She is known for the French series The Returned.

== Early life ==
Thiam was born in Brussels. She wanted to be an actress from the age of four. She took a course in acting in New York at the Lee Strasberg Theatre & Film Institute, staying only two months of a year-long course.

Her mother is half-Armenian and half-Belgian. Her father is half-Senegalese, one-quarter English and one-quarter French; he was born in Dakar. Her father is a percussionist and once toured with Nina Simone. Her mother worked as an agent in Paris and Brussels for small fashion brands. She has one younger brother. Thiam modelled from the age of 4 and throughout her childhood and adolescence. She lived in the Paris neighbourhood, Montmartre with her English grandmother, cousin, and family. Later, she was a student at the drama school, Cours Florent.

== Career ==
She started modelling for a clothing company before she left her career in fashion to become an actress. She was studying at National Conservatory of Dramatic Arts of Paris, when she was cast in The Returned. The French edition of Grazia reported that she rejected a role in Pirates of the Caribbean: Dead Men Tell No Tales to complete her studies. She has also appeared in the French film Salaud, on t'aime.

== Personal life ==
Thiam married Portuguese singer Salvador Sobral in a small ceremony in Lisbon on 29 December 2018.

== Filmography ==
Year	Title	Role	Notes
2009	Le Chant des sirènes	Marine	Short film
2010	Clem	Léna	TV series
2010	R.I.S, police scientifique		TV series
2010	Le Rollerboy	VRP Robotscan 3000	Short film
2010	Bienvenue		Short film
2011	O		Short film
2012–2015	The Returned	Léna Séguret	TV series
2014	Salaud, on t'aime	Hiver Kaminsky	
2014	La Crème de la crème	Photocopy shop girl	
2014	Next Year	Aude	
2014	Wild Life	Céline	
2014	Anton Tchékhov 1890	Lika Mizinova	
2015	Jeanne d'Arc	Jeanne	Short film
2016	Daydreams	Axèle	
2016	The Collection	Nina	TV series
2018	A Paris Education	Valentina	
2018	Capri-Revolution	Lilian	
2018	The Black Book	Suzanne Monfort	
2020	Love Affair(s)	Sandra	
2025	Stereo Girls	Lulu	

== Theatre ==
Year	Title	Director	Location
2011	La Fiancée aux yeux bandés	Daniel Mesguich	Espace Pierre Cardin
2012	Caligula	Sébastien Dpommier	CNSAD
2013	Love Me or Kill Me	Philippe Calvario	CNSAD
2014	À l'Ouest des terres sauvages	Pauline Bayle	Théâtre 13
2016	Danton's Death	François Orsoni	Théâtre de la Bastille
