= Directors' Fortnight =

Independent section held in parallel to the Cannes Film Festival

Directors' Fortnight (Quinzaine des cinéastes)
- Location: Théâtre Croisette, J. W. Marriott, Cannes, France
- Founded: 1969
- Language: French, English
- Website: www.quinzaine-cineastes.fr

The Directors' Fortnight (French: Quinzaine des cinéastes, formerly Quinzaine des réalisateurs) is an independent section held in parallel to the Cannes Film Festival. It was started in 1969 by the French Directors Guild after the events of May 1968 resulted in cancellation of the Cannes festival as an act of solidarity with striking workers.

The Directors' Fortnight showcases a programme of shorts and feature films and documentaries worldwide.

== Artistic directors ==
Programming is overseen by an artistic director. The current artistic director is Julien Rejl who has programmed Director's Fortnight since 2023.

Past artistic directors include Pierre-Henri Deleau (1969–1999), Marie-Pierre Macia (1999-2003), Olivier Père (2004–2009), Frédéric Boyer (2009–2011), Édouard Waintrop (2012–2018) and Paolo Moretti (2018-2022).

== Awards ==
=== Audience Award ===
In partnership with The Fondation Chantal Akerman, for the first time ever, the audience will award one of the films in the main selection with the "Audience Award" or "Choix du Public" in 2024. It's the first ever official award presented by the section, since its creation in 1969:

| Year | English title | Original title | Director(s) | Production country | Ref. |
|---|---|---|---|---|---|
| 2024 | Universal Language | Une Langue universelle | Matthew Rankin | Canada | |
| 2025 | The President's Cake | مملكة القصب | Hasan Hadi | Iraq, Qatar, United States | |
| 2026 | I See Buildings Fall Like Lightning | | Clio Barnard | United Kingdom, France, United States | |

=== Europa Cinemas Label Award Winners ===
The award was created in 2003, and highlights European productions screened at the Directors Fortnight section:

| Year | English title | Original title | Director(s) | Production country |
|---|---|---|---|---|
| 2003 | The Mother | | Roger Michell | United Kingdom |
| 2003 | Kitchen Stories | Salmer fra kjokkenet | Bent Hamer | Norway, Sweden |
| 2004 | In the Battlefields | معارك حب | Danielle Arbid | Lebanon, France, Belgium, Germany |
| 2005 | The Moustache | La moustache | Emmanuel Carrère | France |
| 2006 | 12:08 East of Bucharest | A fost sau n-a fost? | Corneliu Porumboiu | Romania |
| 2007 | Control | | Anton Corbijn | United Kingdom, Australia |
| 2008 | Eldorado | | Bouli Lanners | Belgium, France |
| 2009 | La Pivellina | | Tizza Covi and Rainer Frimmel | Italy, Austria |
| 2010 | Le Quattro Volte | | Michelangelo Frammartino | Italy, Germany, Switzerland |
| 2011 | Breathing | Atmen | Karl Markovics | Austria |
| 2012 | The Repentant | التائب | Merzak Allouache | Algeria |
| 2013 | The Selfish Giant | | Clio Barnard | United Kingdom |
| 2014 | Love at First Fight | Les Combattants | Thomas Cailley | France |
| 2015 | Mustang | | Deniz Gamze Ergüven | France, Germany, Turkey |
| 2016 | Mercenary | Mercenaire | Sacha Wolff | France |
| 2017 | A Ciambra | | Jonas Carpignano | Italy |
| 2018 | Lucia's Grace | Troppa Grazia | Gianni Zanasi | Italy |
| 2019 | Alice and the Mayor | Alice et le Maire | Nicolas Pariser | France |
| 2021 | A Chiara | | Jonas Carpignano | Italy, France, United States, Sweden |
| 2022 | One Fine Morning | Un beau matin | Mia Hansen-Løve | France, Germany |
| 2023 | Creatura | | Elena Martín Gimeno | Spain |
| 2024 | The Other Way Around | Volveréis | Jonás Trueba | Spain, France |
| 2025 | Wild Foxes | La danse des renards | Valéry Carnoy | France, Belgium |
| 2026 | Too Many Beasts | l'Espèce Explosive | Sarah Arnold | Germany, France |

=== SACD Coup de Cœur Prize ===
Awarded to the best French-language feature of the sidebar.

| Year | English title | Original title | Director(s) | Production country | Ref. |
|---|---|---|---|---|---|
| 2025 | Wild Foxes | La danse des renards | Valéry Carnoy | France, Belgium | |
| 2026 | Shana | | Lila Pinell | France | |

=== Carrosse d'Or ===
| Year | Director(s) | Nationality |
|---|---|---|
| 2002 | Jacques Rozier | France |
| 2003 | Clint Eastwood | United States |
| 2004 | Nanni Moretti | Italy |
| 2005 | Ousmane Sembène | Senegal |
| 2006 | David Cronenberg | Canada |
| 2007 | Alain Cavalier | France |
| 2008 | Jim Jarmusch | United States |
| 2009 | Naomi Kawase | Japan |
| 2010 | Agnès Varda | France |
| 2011 | Jafar Panahi | Iran |
| 2012 | Nuri Bilge Ceylan | Turkey |
| 2013 | Jane Campion | New Zealand |
| 2014 | Alain Resnais (posthumous) | France |
| 2015 | Jia Zhangke | China |
| 2016 | Aki Kaurismäki | Finland |
| 2017 | Werner Herzog | Germany |
| 2018 | Martin Scorsese | United States |
| 2019 | John Carpenter | United States |
| 2021 | Frederick Wiseman | United States |
| 2022 | Kelly Reichardt | United States |
| 2023 | Souleymane Cissé | Mali |
| 2024 | Andrea Arnold | United Kingdom |
| 2025 | Todd Haynes | United States |
| 2026 | Claire Denis | France |

== Retired awards ==
=== Art Cinema Award ===
| Year | English title | Original title | Director(s) | Production country | Ref. |
|---|---|---|---|---|---|
| 2014 | Love at First Fight | Les Combattants | Thomas Cailley | France | |
| 2015 | Embrace of the Serpent | El abrazo de la serpiente | Ciro Guerra | Colombia, Venezuela, Argentina | |
| 2016 | Wolf and Sheep | | Shahrbanoo Sadat | Denmark, Afghanistan | |
| 2017 | The Rider | | Chloé Zhao | United States | |
| 2018 | Climax | | Gaspar Noé | Belgium, France | |

=== Other Awards ===
- Illy Prize

== See also ==
- Critics' Week
- ACID

== Bibliography ==
- Pierre-Henri Deleau: La Quinzaine des réalisateurs à Cannes: Cinéma en liberté : 1969-1993 (Broché), Editions de La Martinière, 1993
- Olivier Thévenin: Sociologie d'une institution cinématographique : La S.R.F. et la Quinzaine des réalisateurs (Broché), Paris: l'Harmattan, 2009, ISBN 2-296-09457-0

== Documentaries ==
- 40x15.Les Quarante Ans de la Quinzaine des Réalisateurs, directed by Olivier Jahan, 97 min, 2008 details
