= La Crème de la crème =

2014 film directed by Kim Chapiron

- Film poster
- Directed by: Kim Chapiron
- Written by: Kim Chapiron; Noé Debré
- Produced by: Benjamin Elalouf; Pierre-Ange Le Pogam; Brahim Chioua; Vincent Maraval
- Starring: Thomas Blumenthal; Alice Isaaz; Jean-Baptiste Lafarge
- Cinematography: Crystel Fournier
- Edited by: Benjamin Weill
- Music by: Ibrahim Maalouf
- Production companies: Moonshaker; Stone Angels; Wild Bunch
- Distributed by: Wild Bunch Distribution
- Release date: 2 April 2014
- Running time: 90 minutes
- Country: France
- Language: French
- Budget: €4 million
- Box office: $1.1 million

La Crème de la crème (also titled Smart Ass) is a 2014 French comedy-drama film directed by Kim Chapiron. The film received three nominations at the 20th Lumière Awards, where Thomas Blumenthal and Jean-Baptiste Lafarge were nominated for Best Male Revelation and Alice Isaaz for Best Female Revelation.

Filming took place from 20 August to 5 October 2012.

== Plot ==
The quiet-natured Kelia has just joined a prestigious business school in France (some media will consider this to be HEC Paris). At a party, she meets Dan, an unpopular second-year student whose intelligence is ruled by a cold assessment of the commercial value of every thing. Dan’s room-mate, Jaffar, is continually unsuccessful with girls.

Kelia and Dan then engage a young woman and pay her to accompany Jaffar to a soirée in order to increase his seductive capital with the girls at the school. This is remarked by Louis, a student from Versailles, who proposes to Dan and Kelia that they collaborate and extend the strategy to all those students who wish to increase their 'seduction capital'. This consists of setting up a prostitution club, Les amateurs de Cigares.

The sub-heading of the film refers to their respecting the rules of the marketplace; they rent young people to attend parties. Kelia recruits clients, Louis takes care of them, and Dan handles the accounts. Kelia, who pretends to be a lesbian with her friends, is attracted to Louis, who is confident of his charm, unlike Dan. For his birthday, Kelia and Louis offer Dan Eulalie, recruited in a perfume shop.

Dan refuses the gift, although they end up seeing each other even if Eulalie is working for them. Business goes well, and they expand into an engineering college. However, they are called out and accused of procuring.

Eulalie distances herself from Dan, who is overly jealous. Kelia tries to prove to the principal that they are the best students on campus since they have successfully applied the methods they were taught. At the disciplinary council, Louis and Kelia kiss.

== Cast ==
- Thomas Blumenthal as Dan
- Alice Isaaz as Kelly
- Jean-Baptiste Lafarge as Louis
- Karim Ait M'Hand as Jaffar
- Marine Sainsily as Eulalie
- Marianne Denicourt as Louis' mother
- Bruno Abraham-Kremer as Dan's father
- Jenna Thiam as Photocopy shop girl
- Noémie Merlant as The redhead
- Lucas Bravo as Antoine Mufla
- Jonathan Cohen as Dan's brother
