= Wild Life (2014 film) =

- Film poster
- Directed by: Cédric Kahn
- Screenplay by: Cédric Kahn; Nathalie Najem
- Based on: Hors système, onze ans sous l'étoile de la liberté by Xavier Fortin, Okwari Fortin, Shahi'Yena Fortin and Laurence Vidal
- Produced by: Kristina Larsen; Jean-Pierre Dardenne; Luc Dardenne; Delphine Tomson
- Starring: Mathieu Kassovitz; Céline Sallette
- Cinematography: Yves Cape
- Edited by: Simon Jacquet
- Music by: Mathias Duplessy
- Production companies: Les Films du Lendemain; Les Films du Fleuve; France 2 Cinéma; Belgacom
- Distributed by: Le Pacte
- Release dates: 29 October 2014 (France & Belgium)
- Running time: 106 minutes
- Countries: France; Belgium
- Language: French
- Budget: $6 million
- Box office: $518.000

Wild Life (French: Vie sauvage) is a 2014 French-Belgian drama film directed by Cédric Kahn and adapted from the 2010 book Hors système, onze ans sous l'étoile de la liberté by Xavier Fortin, Okwari Fortin, Shahi'Yena Fortin and Laurence Vidal. The film won the Special Jury Prize at the 62nd San Sebastián International Film Festival. In January 2015, the film received three nominations at the 20th Lumière Awards.

== Cast ==
- Mathieu Kassovitz as Paco (Philippe Fournier)
- Céline Sallette as Nora (Carole Garcia)
- David Gastou as Tsali Fournier (9-year-old)
- Sofiane Neveu as Okyesa Fournier (8-year-old)
- Romain Depret as Tsali Fournier (teenager)
- Jules Ritmanic as Okyesa Fournier (teenager)
- Jenna Thiam as Céline
- Tara-Jay Bangalter as Thomas (11-year-old)
- Amandine Dugas as Clara
- Michaël Dichter as Gaspard
- Brigitte Sy as Geneviève
- Julien Thiou as Clovis
- Judith Simon as Dom
- Ali Marhyar
