= Irreplaceable (film) =

- Theatrical release poster
- Médecin de campagne
- Directed by: Thomas Lilti
- Written by: Baya Kasmi; Thomas Lilti
- Produced by: Emmanuel Barraux; Agnès Vallée
- Starring: François Cluzet; Marianne Denicourt
- Cinematography: Nicolas Gaurin
- Edited by: Christel Dewynter
- Music by: Alexandre Lier; Sylvain Ohrel; Nicolas Weil
- Production companies: 31 Juin Films; Cinéfrance; Le Pacte; France 2 Cinéma
- Distributed by: Le Pacte
- Release date: 23 March 2016
- Running time: 102 minutes
- Country: France
- Language: French
- Budget: $5.8 million
- Box office: $15.1 million

Irreplaceable (original title: Médecin de campagne), released in some countries as The Country Doctor, is a 2016 French dramedy film directed and co-written by Thomas Lilti. It stars François Cluzet and Marianne Denicourt.

== Synopsis ==
Jean-Pierre Werner, a country doctor who has lived his life devoted to his job, finds out he is suffering from an inoperable brain tumor. His doctor advises him to retire and rest. Soon thereafter, a lady doctor from the city arrives to help him with his practice, but the arrangement unsettles Jean-Pierre, who considers himself indispensable.

== Cast ==
- François Cluzet as Jean-Pierre Werner
- Marianne Denicourt as Nathalie Delezia
- Isabelle Sadoyan as Werner's mother
- Félix Moati as Vincent Werner
- Patrick Descamps as Francis Maroini
- Christophe Odent as Norès
- Guy Faucher as Mr Sorlin
- Margaux Fabre as Ninon
- Julien Lucas as Ninon's boyfriend
- Yohann Goetzmann as Alexis
- Philippe Bertin as Guy
- Géraldine Schitter as Fanny

== Release ==
The film was released in France in 2016.

It was released in Australian cinemas as The Country Doctor in March 2017.

== Accolades ==
Award / Film Festival	Category	Recipients and nominees	Result
César Awards	Best Actor	François Cluzet	Nominated
