= The Bloom of Yesterday =

2016 film

- Directed by: Chris Kraus
- Starring: Lars Eidinger; Adèle Haenel
- Release date: 27 October 2016 (Tokyo)
- Running time: 125 minutes
- Countries: Austria; Germany
- Language: German

The Bloom of Yesterday (German: Die Blumen von gestern) is a 2016 German-Austrian comedy film directed by Chris Kraus.

== Cast ==
- Lars Eidinger as Totila Blumen
- Adèle Haenel as Zazie Lindeau
- Jan Josef Liefers as Balthasar Thomas
- Hannah Herzsprung as Hannah Blumen
- Sigrid Marquardt as Tara Rubinstein
- Bibiane Zeller as Lisbeth Blumen
- Rolf Hoppe as Professor Norkus
- Eva Löbau as Anita Koldewey

== Reception ==
The film won the Grand Prize and the Audience Award at the 2016 Tokyo International Film Festival and subsequently won several awards and nominations. Martin Schwickert, of Zeit Online, said the dialogue had "almost Woody Allen's brilliance and speed."
