= Love at First Fight (film) =

2014 film

- French theatrical poster
- Directed by: Thomas Cailley
- Written by: Thomas Cailley; Claude Le Pape
- Produced by: Pierre Guyard
- Starring: Adèle Haenel; Kévin Azaïs
- Cinematography: David Cailley
- Edited by: Lilian Corbeille
- Music by: Lionel Flairs; Benoît Rault; Philippe Deshaies
- Distributed by: Haut et Court
- Release dates: 17 May 2014 (Cannes); 20 August 2014 (France)
- Running time: 98 minutes
- Country: France
- Language: French
- Budget: $3 million
- Box office: $2.3 million

Love at First Fight (French: Les Combattants) is a 2014 French romantic comedy film directed by Thomas Cailley. It was screened as part of the Directors' Fortnight section of the 2014 Cannes Film Festival, where it won the FIPRESCI Prize in the Parallel Section. In January 2015, the film received nine nominations at the 40th César Awards, winning Best Actress, Most Promising Actor and Best First Feature Film.

== Cast ==
- Adèle Haenel as Madeleine
- Kévin Azaïs as Arnaud Labrède
- Antoine Laurent as Manu Labrède
- Brigitte Roüan as Hélène Labrède
- William Lebghil as Xavier
- Thibault Berducat as Victor
- Nicolas Wanczycki as Lieutenant Schliefer
- Steve Tientcheu as Adjudant Ruiz

== Production ==
Filming locations included Mimizan, Lit-et-Mixe, Biscarrosse, Pau, Pissos, Lacanau, Maubuisson (Carcans), Langon, Pessac and Bizanos. Filming also took place at the Camp de Ger of the 1st Parachute Hussar Regiment, which straddles two departments, Hautes-Pyrénées and Pyrénées-Atlantiques.

== Accolades ==
Award / Film Festival	Category	Recipients and nominees	Result
Cabourg Film Festival	Male Revelation	Kévin Azaïs	Won
2014 Cairo International Film Festival	Best Actress	Adèle Haenel	Won
2014 Cannes Film Festival	FIPRESCI Prize (Directors' Fortnight)	Thomas Cailley	Won
2014 Cannes Film Festival	Art Cinema Award	Thomas Cailley	Won
2014 Cannes Film Festival	SACD Prize (Directors' Fortnight)	Thomas Cailley	Won
2014 Cannes Film Festival	Europa Cinemas Label Award	Thomas Cailley	Won
2014 Cannes Film Festival	Caméra d'Or	Thomas Cailley	Nominated
40th César Awards	Best Film	Love at First Fight	Nominated
40th César Awards	Best Director	Thomas Cailley	Nominated
40th César Awards	Best Actress	Adèle Haenel	Won
40th César Awards	Most Promising Actor	Kévin Azaïs	Won
40th César Awards	Best Original Screenplay	Thomas Cailley and Claude Le Pape	Nominated
40th César Awards	Best First Feature Film	Love at First Fight	Won
40th César Awards	Best Editing	Lilian Corbeille	Nominated
40th César Awards	Best Sound	Jean-Luc Audy, Guillaume Bouchateau and Niels Barletta	Nominated
40th César Awards	Best Music Written for a Film	Lionel Flairs, Benoît Rault and Philippe Deshaies	Nominated
Globes de Cristal Award	Best Film	Love at First Fight	Nominated
Globes de Cristal Award	Best Actress	Adèle Haenel	Nominated
2014 Louis Delluc Prize	Best First Film	Thomas Cailley	Won
20th Lumière Awards	Best Actress	Adèle Haenel	Nominated
20th Lumière Awards	Best Male Revelation	Kévin Azaïs	Won
20th Lumière Awards	Best First Film	Love at First Fight	Won
Prix du Syndicat Français de la Critique de Cinéma	Best First Film	Love at First Fight	Won
