= Marianne Denicourt =

French actress, film director and screenwriter

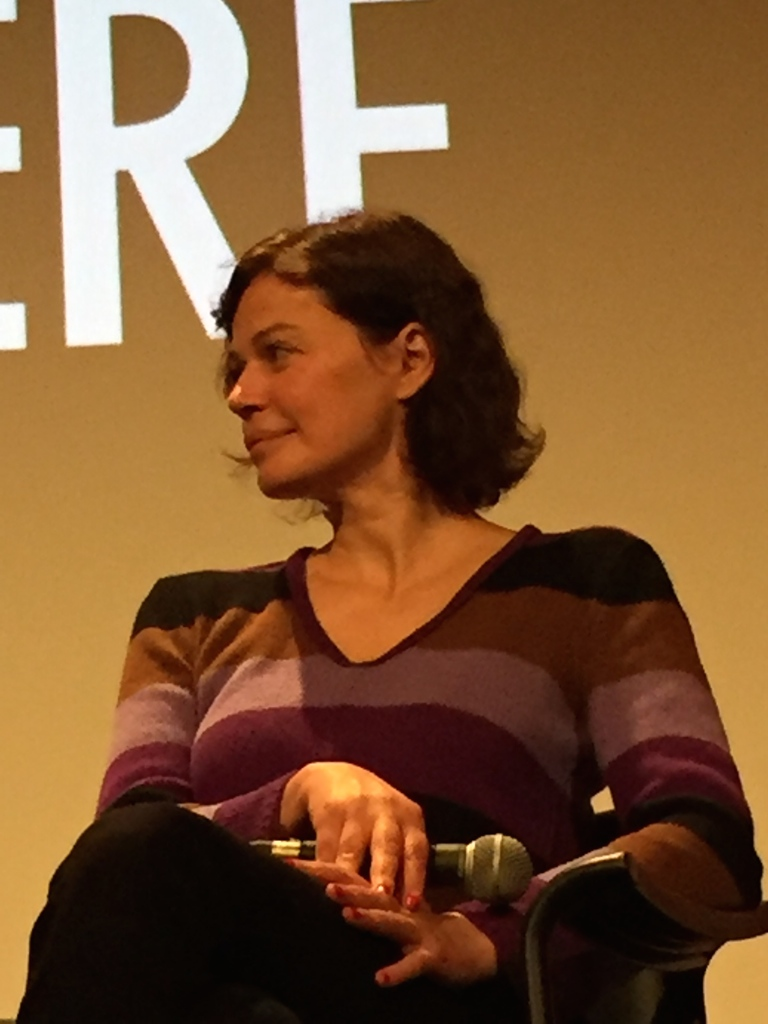
- Denicourt in 2017
- Born: Marianne Cuau; 14 May 1966 (age 59); Paris, France
- Occupation(s): Actress, director, screenwriter
- Years active: 1987–present

Marianne Denicourt (née Cuau; born 14 May 1966) is a French actress, director and screenwriter who has appeared in more than 50 films and television productions since 1986.

She studied under Patrice Chéreau in 1985–86 at the Ecole du Théâtre des Amandiers in the western Paris suburb of Nanterre.

== Filmography ==
Year	Title	Role	Director	Notes
1987	Hôtel de France	Catherine	Patrice Chéreau	
1987	Cinéma 16	Marie	Jean-Louis Comolli & Jacques Doillon	TV series (2 episodes)
1988	The Reader	Bella	Michel Deville	
1989	Vanille fraise	Gloria	Gérard Oury	
1989	Comme d'habitude		Bruno Herbulot	Short
1989	Le conte d'hiver	Émilia	Pierre Cavassilas	TV movie
1990	Aventure de Catherine C.	Flore	Pierre Beuchot	
1990	Déminage	Jeanne	Pierre-Oscar Lévy	Short
1991	La Belle Noiseuse	Julienne	Jacques Rivette	
1991	La vie des morts	Pascale Mac Gillis	Arnaud Desplechin	
1991	Pierre qui roule	Marie	Marion Vernoux	TV movie
1991	Le gang des tractions		Josée Dayan & François Rossini	TV mini-series
1992	The Sentinel	Marie Barillet	Arnaud Desplechin (2)	
1992	Divertimento	Julienne	Jacques Rivette (2)	
1992	L'échange		Vincent Pérez	Short
1992	Siblings, ce qu'on ne peut traduire		Bénédicte Brunet	Short
1992	Navarro	Christine	Patrick Jamain	TV series (1 episode)
1993	L'instinct de l'ange	Léa	Richard Dembo	
1993	Julie Lescaut	Isabelle	Caroline Huppert	TV series (1 episode)
1994	Bête de scène	The Girl	Bernard Nissile	Short
1994	Doomsday Gun	Monique	Robert Young	TV movie
1994	Pas si grand que ça !	Camille	Bruno Herbulot	TV movie
1994	3000 scénarios contre un virus		Benoît Jacquot	TV series (1 episode)
1994	Ferbac	Josy	Christian Faure	TV series (1 episode)
1995	Up, Down, Fragile	Louise	Jacques Rivette (3)	
1995	Innocent Lies	Maud Graves	Patrick Dewolf	
1996	My Sex Life... or How I Got into an Argument	Sylvia	Arnaud Desplechin (3)	
1996	Le bel été 1914	Blanche Pailleron	Christian de Chalonge	
1996	Passage à l'acte	Nathalie	Francis Girod	
1996	Le masseur	The Woman	Vincent Ravalec	Short
1997	Day and Night	Ariane	Bernard-Henri Lévy	
1998	Rider of the Flames	Susette Gontard	Nina Grosse	
1999	The Lost Son	Nathalie	Chris Menges	
1999	One 4 All	Irina Colbert	Claude Lelouch	
1999	Le plus beau pays du monde	Lucie	Marcel Bluwal	
1999	À mort la mort !	Hermeline	Romain Goupil	
1999	L'homme de ma vie	Céline	Stéphane Kurc	
1999	Balzac	Adèle Hugo	Josée Dayan (2)	TV movie
2000	Sade	Sensible	Benoît Jacquot (2)	
2001	Me Without You	Isabel	Sandra Goldbacher	
2001	Heidi	Dete Caduff	Markus Imboden	
2002	Quelqu'un de bien	Marie	Patrick Timsit	
2002	Monique	Claire	Valérie Guignabodet	
2002	La merveilleuse odyssée de l'idiot Toboggan		Vincent Ravalec (2)	
2004	L'américain	Murielle	Patrick Timsit (2)	
2005	The Lost Domain	Ivonne	Raúl Ruiz	
2006	Djihad !	Delphine	Felix Olivier	TV movie
2009	La sainte Victoire	Françoise Gleize	François Favrat	
2009	Folie douce	Françoise	Josée Dayan (3)	TV movie
2009	Reporters	Marie Clément	Gilles Bannier & Jean-Marc Brondolo	TV series (7 episodes)
2011	Une folle envie	Lili Magellan	Bernard Jeanjean	
2012	Bankable	Sophie Brun	Mona Achache	TV movie
2013	Nicolas Le Floch	Belle Aglae	Philippe Bérenger	TV series (1 episode)
2014	Hippocrate	Denormandy	Thomas Lilti	Nominated – César Award for Best Supporting Actress
2014	L'Affaire SK1	The Crim's Chief	Frédéric Tellier	
2014	La Crème de la crème	Louis's Mother	Kim Chapiron	
2016	Irreplaceable	Nathalie Delezia	Thomas Lilti (2)	
2017	Chacun sa vie et son intime conviction		Claude Lelouch (2)	
2019	The Best Years of a Life		Claude Lelouch	

== Theatre ==
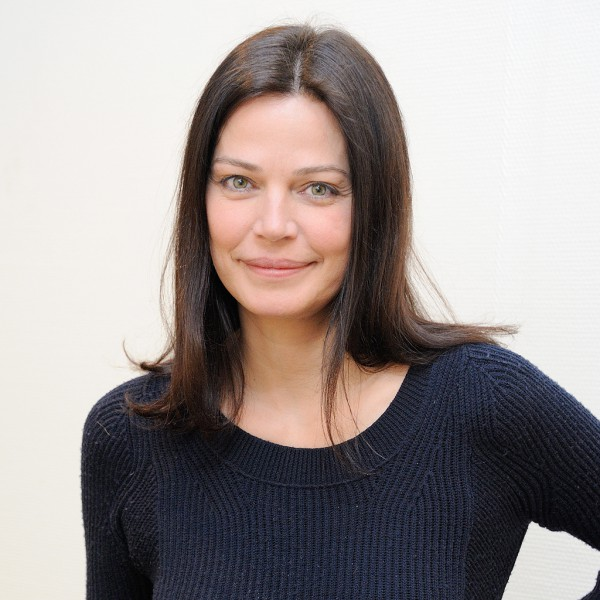
Marianne Denicourt in 2012

Year	Title	Author	Director	Notes
1987	Platonov	Anton Chekhov	Patrice Chéreau	Théâtre Nanterre-Amandiers
1987	Penthesilea	Heinrich von Kleist	Pierre Romans	Festival d'Avignon
1988	The Winter's Tale	William Shakespeare	Luc Bondy	Théâtre Nanterre-Amandiers
1988–89	Hamlet	William Shakespeare	Patrice Chéreau (2)	Festival d'Avignon
1995	Anatol	Arthur Schnitzler	Louis-Do de Lencquesaing	Théâtre de Nice
1998	Skylight	David Hare	Bernard Murat	Théâtre de la Gaîté-Montparnasse
1999	The Blue Room	Arthur Schnitzler	Bernard Murat (2)	Théâtre Antoine-Simone Berriau
2004	A Spanish Play	Yasmina Reza	Luc Bondy (2)	Théâtre de la Madeleine
2006	La Musica	Marguerite Duras	Nicole Aubry	Théâtre de l'Atelier
2007	Jeanne d'Arc au bûcher	Arthur Honegger		Opéra de Bâle
2009	The City	Martin Crimp	Marc Paquien	Théâtre des Célestins
2013	Camus l'humaniste	Albert Camus	Gauthier Morax	
