= Faire: L'amour =

- Directed by: Djinn Carrénard
- Written by: Djinn Carrénard
- Produced by: Djinn Carrénard
- Starring: Azu; Laurette Lalande
- Cinematography: Djinn Carrénard
- Distributed by: ARP Sélection
- Release dates: 15 May 2014 (Cannes); 3 September 2014 (France)
- Running time: 165 minutes
- Country: France
- Language: French

Faire: L'amour, also known as FLA, is a 2014 French drama film directed by Djinn Carrénard. It was the opening film of the Critics' Week section at the 2014 Cannes Film Festival.

== Cast ==
- Azu as Oussmane
- Laurette Lalande as Laure
- Maha as Kahina
- Axel Philippon as Ramon
