= Hippocrate =

- Film poster
- Directed by: Thomas Lilti
- Written by: Thomas Lilti; Baya Kasmi; Julien Lilti; Pierre Chosson
- Produced by: Agnès Vallée; Emmanuel Barraux
- Starring: Vincent Lacoste; Reda Kateb; Jacques Gamblin; Marianne Denicourt
- Cinematography: Nicolas Gaurin
- Edited by: Christel Dewynter
- Music by: Alexandre Lier; Sylvain Ohrel; Nicolas Weil; LOW Entertainment
- Production companies: 31 juin Films; France 2 Cinéma; Canal+ Ciné+ Le Pacte
- Distributed by: Le Pacte
- Release dates: 22 May 2014 (Cannes); 3 September 2014 (France)
- Running time: 102 minutes
- Country: France
- Language: French
- Budget: $4.3 million
- Box office: $7.4 million

Hippocrate (also known as Hippocrates and Hippocrates: Diary of a French Doctor) is a 2014 French drama film directed by Thomas Lilti. It was screened as part of the Critics' Week section at the 2014 Cannes Film Festival. The film received seven nominations at the 40th César Awards, winning Best Supporting Actor for Reda Kateb. In 2018 Lilti created a related television series of the same name, which follows interns in a French hospital. It was renewed for a second season in 2021.

== Plot ==
Benjamin Barois (Vincent Lacoste) starts his medical internship in the service led by his father, Dr. Barois (Jacques Gamblin). Feeling enthusiastic, at first, he meets Abdel Rezzak (Reda Kateb), another fellow intern who's from Algeria. However, he is soon caught up by the harsh reality of the hospital work. Indeed, during a night shift, Benjamin visits Jean-Michel Lemoine, a homeless patient who has abdominal pains. Benjamin tries his best to reassure him and prescribes him analgesics but, because of the misfunctions of the device, he cannot do an ECG. The morning after, a colleague tells him that Mr Lemoine is dead.

Benjamin is, then, summoned by his superior, Dr. Denormandy (Marianne Denicourt) to review with her about what happened yesterday. Benjamin confesses he couldn't do the ECG. Dr. Denormandy tells him that, if someone were to ask him about the matter, he must reply that he actually did the ECG and didn't notice anything abnormal. This case put a strain on Benjamin's relationship with Abdel, as Benjamin told Mr Lemoine's widow that it was actually Abdel who took care of her husband, not him.

Meanwhile, Benjamin and Abdel are also taking care of another patient, Mrs Richard (Jeanne Cellard), an 80-year-old woman, who used to be a gymnast, and now, has a metastatic cancer and had to go recently through a femur neck surgery. While they are discussing about the appropriate treatment to deliver as well as the level of pain Mrs Richard feels, Abdel decides to install a morphine pump so that she won't suffer anymore. However, it appears that the patient doesn't eat much, which could put her life at risk. Abdel disagrees with Dr. Denormandy concerning the procedure to be followed and accepts reluctanctantly the removal of the morphine pump.

During another night shift of Benjamin, the latter is called after Mrs Richard has lost consciousness. As he enters the room, he sees his colleagues trying to resuscitate the patient, which provokes his anger. When Mrs Richard's family, who has been informed by a nurse, arrives, Abdel and Benjamin discuss with them about the possibility to put an end to the life of the patient, in accordance with the Leonetti law. The family accepts, as there is no point in persisting any further and making Mrs Richard suffer.

However, Abdel and Benjamin were not supposed to take this decision by themselves, in the middle of the night. Consequently, they are summoned for a disciplinary hearing, attended by Dr. Denormandy, Dr. Barois and the critical care team leader. After discussion, it was decided that Benjamin won't be punished due to his age as well as his emotional state during the events. However, a misconduct statement will be added to Abdel's file, much to the latter's dismay. Indeed, it could probably prevent him from doing other internships, putting an end to his goal of obtaining a certificate of equivalence for his Algerian qualification and so, being allowed to practice as a doctor in France.

Benjamin, who, meanwhile, has ended up befriending Abdel, is distraught by this decision, claiming that everything is his fault. One night, after getting drunk, he goes to Mrs Lemoine's place and confesses that they haven't conducted all the necessary examinations that could have prevented the death of her late husband. He then goes to the hospital and starts wrecking the equipments and disturbing the patients before running away from the nurses and security guards. However, after leaving the hospital, he ends up getting hit by a truck. The morning after, after gathering the interns, Dr. Barois and the hospital director inform them that Benjamin has woken up and that Mrs Lemoine is suing the hospital for medical malpractice. Appalled by the news, the medical staff blames the director, claiming that these kinds of errors happen because they are understaffed and that they only have defective equipments. For the very same reasons, they demand the withdrawal of Abdel's sanction, which they obtain.

Eventually, Benjamin recovers from his injuries and is happy to learn that Abdel will be able to continue practising. He personally changes service and joins the neurology one, gaining back the enthusiastic attitude he had when he started his internship.

== Cast ==
- Vincent Lacoste as Benjamin Barois
- Reda Kateb as Abdel Rezzak
- Jacques Gamblin as Dr. Barois
- Marianne Denicourt as Dr. Denormandy
- Félix Moati as Stéphane
- Carole Franck as Myriam
- Philippe Rebbot as Guy
- Julie Brochen as Mrs Lemoine
- Jeanne Cellard as Mrs Richard
- Fanny Sidney as Estelle
- Thierry Levaret as Mr Lemoine
