= Lulu femme nue =

- Film poster
- Directed by: Sólveig Anspach
- Screenplay by: Sólveig Anspach; Jean-Luc Gaget
- Based on: Lulu femme nue by Étienne Davodeau
- Produced by: Jean Labadie; Caroline Roussel
- Starring: Karin Viard; Bouli Lanners; Claude Gensac
- Cinematography: Isabelle Razavet
- Edited by: Anne Riegel
- Music by: Martin Wheeler
- Production companies: Arturo Mio; Le Pacte; Orange Cinéma Séries
- Distributed by: Le Pacte
- Release dates: 31 July 2013 (Lama Film Festival); 22 January 2014 (France)
- Running time: 90 minutes
- Country: France
- Language: French
- Budget: $2.2 million
- Box office: $3.7 million

Lulu femme nue (festival title: Lulu in the Nude) is a 2013 French comedy-drama film directed by Sólveig Anspach and based on the comic book Lulu femme nue by Etienne Davodeau.

== Cast ==
- Karin Viard as Lulu
- Bouli Lanners as Charles
- Claude Gensac as Marthe
- Pascal Demolon as Richard
- Philippe Rebbot as Jean-Marie
- Marie Payen as Cécile
- Solene Rigot as Morgane
- Nina Meurisse as Virginie
- Corinne Masiero as The café owner

== Accolades ==
Karin Viard won the Lumière Award for Best Actress at the 20th Lumière Awards.
