= Kévin Azaïs =

French actor

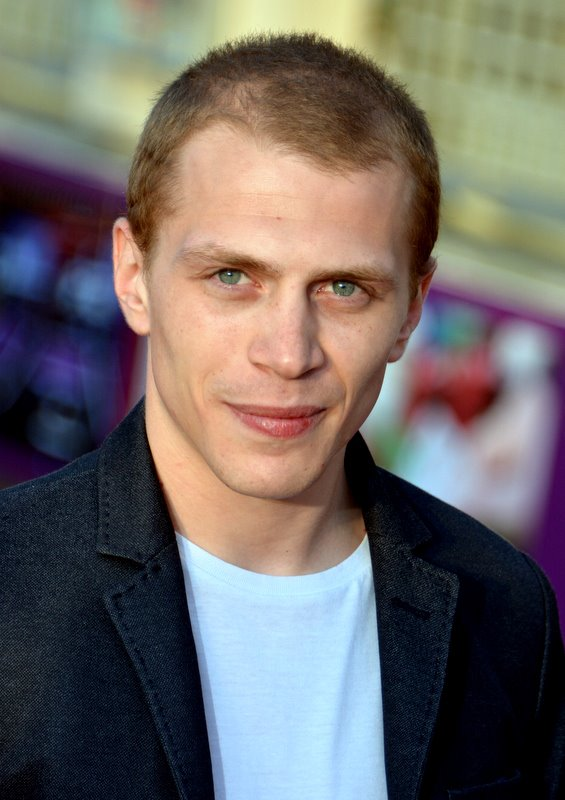
- Azaïs at the 2015 Cabourg Film Festival
- Born: (age 31)
- Occupation: Actor
- Years active: 2008–present

Kévin Azaïs is a French actor. He is best known for his performance in the film Love at First Fight (Les Combattants), for which he won a César Award for Most Promising Actor and a Lumière Award for Best Male Revelation.

He is the brother of actor Vincent Rottiers.

== Filmography ==
Year	Title	Role	Notes
2008	La Journée de la jupe	Sébastien	
2012	Comme un homme	Greg	
2012	Le Père Noël et le Cowboy	Le Père Noël	Short film
2013	Je fais le mort	Ludo	
2013	Vandal	Johan	
2013	The Marchers	Rémi	
2013	Animal sérénade	Sacha	Short film
2014	Love at First Fight	Arnaud Labrède	Cabourg Film Festival Award for Male Revelation; César Award for Most Promising Actor; Lumière Award for Best Male Revelation
2014	L'Année prochaine	Sébastien	
2015	The Wakhan Front	William Denis	
2015	Summertime	Antoine	
2016	The Young One	Zico	
2016	Souvenir	Jean	
2017	A Taste Of Ink	Vincent	Stockholm International Film Festival Award for Best Actor; Saint-Jean-de-Luz Film Festival Award for Best Actor; Aubagne International Film festival Award for Best Male Performance
2017	C'est la vie!	Patrice	
