= May Allah Bless France! =

- French theatrical release poster
- Directed by: Abd al Malik
- Written by: Abd al Malik
- Starring: Marc Zinga; Sabrina Ouazani
- Release date: 25 August 2014 (Angoulême)
- Running time: 95 minutes
- Country: France
- Language: French
- Budget: $2.5 million
- Box office: $1.3 million

May Allah Bless France! (French: Qu'Allah bénisse la France) is a French biographical drama film, released in 2014. The directorial debut of French hip hop musician Abd al Malik, the film is a dramatization of his own childhood memoir Qu'Allah bénisse la France, which was first published in 2004.

The film stars Marc Zinga as the young al Malik.

== Cast ==
- Marc Zinga as Régis
- Sabrina Ouazani as Nawel
- Larouci Didi as Samir
- Mickaël Nagenraft as Mike
- Matteo Falkone as Pascal
- Stéphane Fayette-Mikano as Bilal
- Mireille Perrier as Miss Schaeffer
- Gianni Giardinelli as The gangster

== Accolades ==
The film won the FIPRESCI Discovery Prize at the 2014 Toronto International Film Festival.
