= Thomas Cailley =

French screenwriter and film director

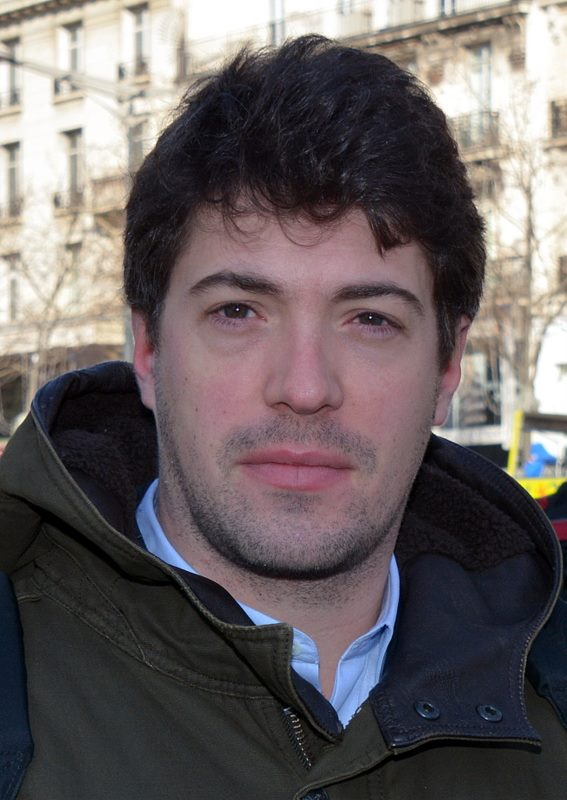
- Thomas Cailley in 2015
- Born: 29 April 1980 (age 46); Clermont-Ferrand, France
- Occupations: Screenwriter, director
- Years active: 2009–present

Thomas Cailley (French: [tɔmɑ kajɛ]; born 29 April 1980) is a French screenwriter and film director. In 2014, he made his feature directorial debut with Love at First Fight, which won three César Awards including Best First Film. In 2023 he made his second movie The Animal Kingdom.

== Biography ==
Born in Clermont-Ferrand Cailley, studied at Sciences Po Bordeaux. After completing general studies, he spent three years working in a company producing television documentaries. In 2007, he entered La Fémis, studying in the screenwriting department.

He is a member of the Collectif 50/50, which aims to promote gender equality and diversity in cinema and audiovisual.

== Filmography ==
Year	Title	Role	Notes	Ref(s)
2009	À domicile	Writer	Short directed by Bojina Panayotova	
2011	Paris Shanghai	Director/Writer/Composer	Short; IndieLisboa International Independent Film Festival - Best Short Film; Molodist International Film Festival - Best Film	
2012	Baba Noël	Writer	Short directed by Walid Mattar	
2012	Le premier pas	Writer	Short directed by Jonathan Lennuyeux-Comnène	
2014	Love at First Fight	Director/Writer	César Award for Best First Film; Cannes Film Festival - C.I.C.A.E. Award; Cannes Film Festival - FIPRESCI Award; Cannes Film Festival - Label Europa Cinemas; Cannes Film Festival - SACD Prize; Louis Delluc Prize - Best First Film; French Syndicate of Cinema Critics - Best First Film; Nominated - César Award for Best Original Screenplay; Nominated - César Award for Best Director; Nominated - César Award for Best Film; Nominated - Cannes Film Festival - Golden Camera; Nominated - Cannes Film Festival - Queer Palm; Nominated - Globes de Cristal Award - Best Film; Nominated - Lumière Award for Best First Film	
2015	Louise Attaque: "Anomalie"	Director	Music video	
2016	Ma révolution	Writer	Directed by Ramzi Ben Sliman	
2016	Trepalium	Writer	TV Mini-Series, directed by Vincent Lannoo	
2018	Ami-ami	Writer	Directed by Victor Saint Macary	
2018	Ad Vitam	Director/Writer	TV Mini-Series, co-directed 3 episodes with Manuel Schapira	
2023	The Animal Kingdom	Director/Writer	Lumière Award for Best Director; Nominated – César Award for Best Director	

== Decorations ==
- Chevalier of the Order of Arts and Letters (2015)
