= Thomas Lilti =

French filmmaker (born 1976)

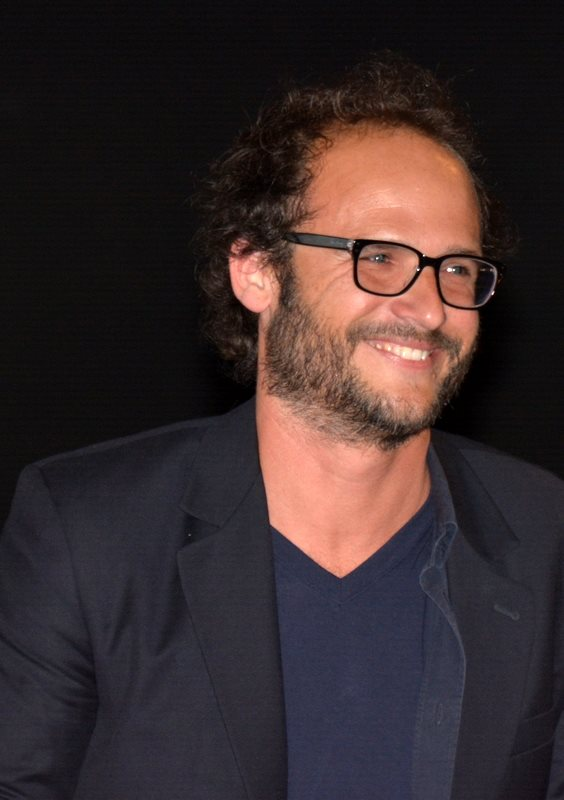
- Lilti in 2015
- Born: 30 May 1976 (age 49); France
- Occupations: Doctor; film director; screenwriter
- Years active: 1999–present

Thomas Lilti (born 30 May 1976) is a French doctor and filmmaker.

== Filmography ==
Year	Title	Role	Notes
1999	Quelques heures en hiver	Director / Writer	Short
2002	Après l'enfance	Director / Writer	Short
2003	Roue libre	Director / Writer	Short
2007	Les yeux bandés	Director / Writer	Nominated — Montreal World Film Festival - Golden Zenith
2012	Mariage à Mendoza	Writer	Directed by Edouard Deluc
2012	Télé gaucho	Writer	Directed by Michel Leclerc
2014	Hippocrate	Director / Writer	Nominated — César Award for Best Film; Nominated — César Award for Best Director; Nominated — César Award for Best Original Screenplay; Nominated — Globes de Cristal Award for Best Film; Nominated — Lumière Award for Best Screenplay
2016	Irreplaceable	Director / Writer	
2018	The Freshmen	Director / Writer	Nominated — Lumière Award for Best Screenplay
2018, 2021	Hippocrate	Creator, director, writer	TV series based on his 2014 film
2023	A Real Job	Director / Writer	
