= Lola Le Lann =

French actress (born 1996)

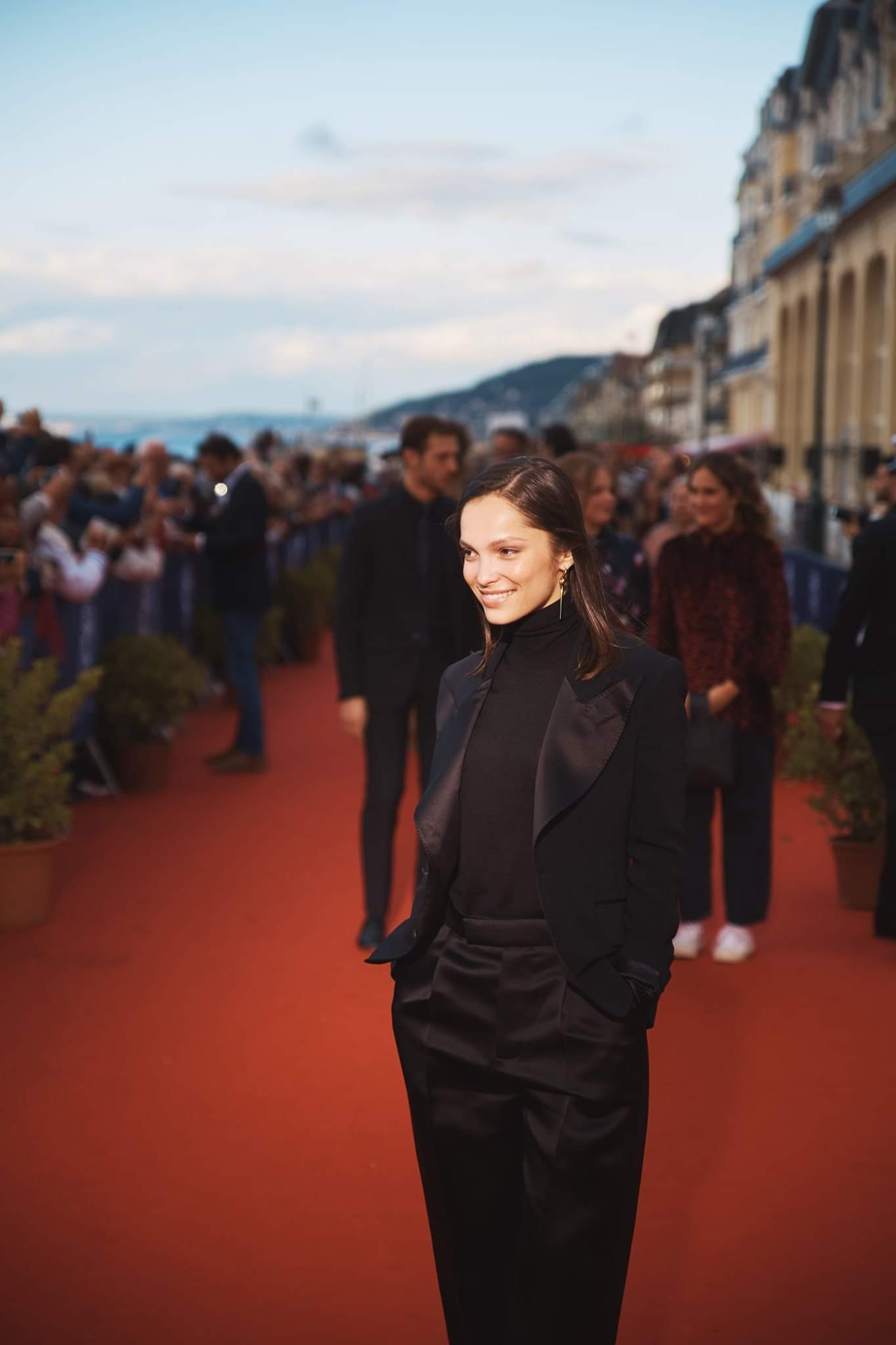
- Le Lann at the 2019 Cabourg Film Festival
- Born: 9 February 1996 (age 30); France
- Occupations: Actress, singer-songwriter, musician, model
- Years active: 2015–present
- Father: Éric Le Lann
- Musical career
- Instrument: piano

Lola Le Lann (born 9 February 1996) is a French actress and singer-songwriter. She is known for her roles in One Wild Moment (2015), A Bluebird in My Heart (2018) and Versus (2019).

== Early life ==
She is the daughter of jazz trumpeter Éric Le Lann and actress and filmmaker Valérie Stroh.

== Music ==
Albums

- Glaz (2020)
- Odeur PMU (2021)

In 2020, Le Lann delayed the launch of her new album after one of her collaborators was accused of sexual misconduct.

== Filmography ==
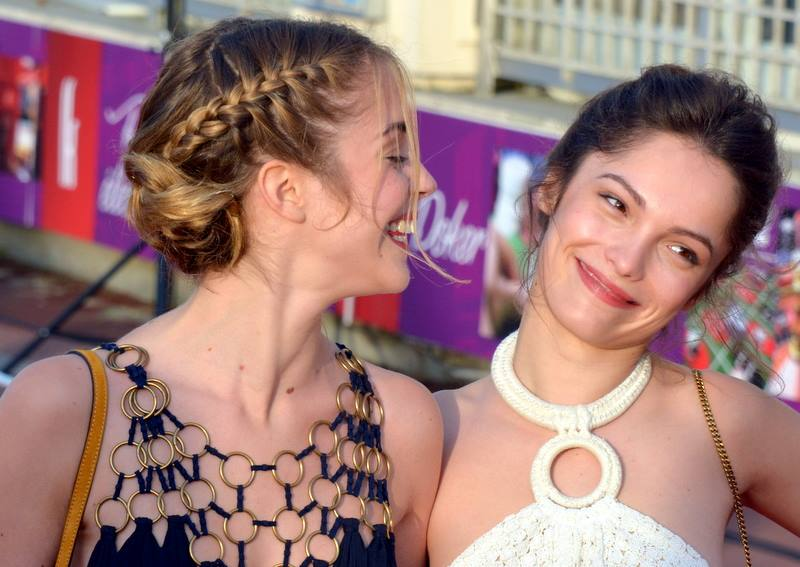
Le Lann (right) with her One Wild Moment co-star Alice Isaaz at the 2015 Cabourg Film Festival

Le Lann made her acting debut in Jean-François Richet's 2015 comedy, One Wild Moment starring alongside Vincent Cassel, François Cluzet and Alice Isaaz, where she portrayed a 17-year-old girl who falls in love with her friend's father. In 2018, she starred in A Bluebird in My Heart and the television series War on Beasts. In 2019, she appeared in her third film, Versus. In 2023 she appeared in season 2 of Ganglands (Braqueurs).

Year	Title	Role	Notes
2015	Le grand journal de Canal+	Herself	
2015	One Wild Moment	Louna	Film debut, directed by Jean-François Richet, starring Vincent Cassel and François Cluzet
2015	Vivement dimanche prochain	Herself	
2015	Días de cine	Herself	
2017	Addict		TV series (Episode:Casting Pervers)
2018	A Bluebird in My Heart	Clara	Directed by Jérémie Guez, starring Roland Møller, Veerle Baetens and Lubna Azabal
2018	War on Beasts (Aux animaux la guerre)	Lydie Duruy	TV series, directed by Alain Tasma, starring Roshdy Zem and Michel Subor
2019	Les Terriens du samedi!	Herself	
2019	Versus	Léa / Camille's friend	Directed by François Valla, starring Jules Pelissier and Karidja Touré
2021	Lino	Charly	Short film directed by Aurélien Vernhes
2022	Le Mur des morts	Juliette	Directed by Eugène Green
2022	Astrid et Raphaëlle	Abigaël	TV series (Episode: Natifs)
2023	Ganglands (Braqueurs)	Kelly	TV series (three episodes)
