= Karma Police (disambiguation) =

Karma Police is a 1997 song by Radiohead.

Karma Police or variant may also refer to:

- Karma Police (surveillance programme), operated by the United Kingdom's Government Communications Headquarters
- Karmapolice, a 2023 French film
- "Karma Police", a song by Cumgirl8 from The 8th Cumming
