= Youssef Hajdi =

French actor

Youssef Hajdi, born 8 June 1979 in Tarascon, is a French actor.

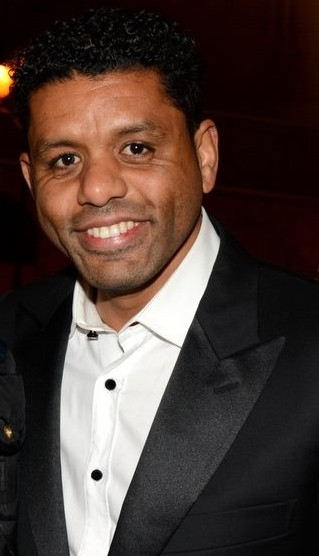
Youssef Hajdi in 2014

== Biography ==
Born in Tarascon in Bouches-du-Rhône to Moroccan parents, he grew up in Beaucaire. He went to Paris at age 20, where he worked in cafe-theatre and at the théâtre de l’Avancée. Then from 2002 to 2005, he studied acting with Jack Waltzer, a lifetime member of the Actors Studio.

His first film role was in 13 m² by Barthélémy Grossmann, which earned him a 2008 nomination for the Césars award in 2008. He acted in The Extraordinary Adventures of Adèle Blanc-Sec by Luc Besson and in Micmacs by Jean-Pierre Jeunet. In 2012, he joined Omar Sy and Laurent Lafitte in On the Other Side of the Tracks, a film by David Charhon. As well, he appeared with Éric Judor in the film Mohamed Dubois by Ernesto Ona in 2013.

In 2014, he acted in La Dernière Échappée, a film by Fabien Onteniente, in which Hajdi played Eddy Clavel, a doctor who treated Laurent Fignon (Samuel Le Bihan). In 2015, he did voice acting for the animated film Pourquoi j'ai pas mangé mon père by Jamel Debbouze.

== Filmography ==
=== Films ===
- 2007 : Paris Lockdown by Frédéric Schoendoerffer
- 2007 : 13 m² by Barthélémy Grossmann
- 2007 : L'invité by Laurent Bouhnik
- 2008 : La Première Étoile by Lucien Jean-Baptiste
- 2008 : Black by Pierre Laffargue
- 2009 : Micmacs by Jean-Pierre Jeunet
- 2010 : The Extraordinary Adventures of Adèle Blanc-Sec by Luc Besson
- 2011 : Halal police d'État by Rachid Dhibou
- 2011 : La Ligne droite by Régis Wargnier
- 2011 : Low Cost by Maurice Barthélemy
- 2011 : Free Men by Ismaël Ferroukhi
- 2012 : On the Other Side of the Tracks by David Charhon
- 2013 : Mohamed Dubois by Ernesto Ona
- 2013 : The Informant by Julien Leclercq
- 2013 : Au bonheur des ogres by Nicolas Bary
- 2014 : Vincent n'a pas d'écailles by Thomas Salvador
- 2014 : Face Down by Kamen Kalev
- 2015 : The New Adventures of Aladdin by Arthur Benzaquen
- 2015 : The Crew by Julien Leclercq
- 2017 : Problemos by Éric Judor
- 2018 : Larguées by Éloïse Lang
- 2018 : Pupille by Jeanne Herry
- 2019 : Deerskin by Quentin Dupieux
- 2019 : Damien veut changer le monde by Xavier de Choudens
- 2019 : Blonde Animals by Maxime Matray, Alexia Walther
- 2019 : Divorce Club by Michaël Youn
- 2019 : C'est la vie by Julien Rambaldi
- 2022 : Bigbug by Jean-Pierre Jeunet
- 2023 : Disparition inquiétante: Retour aux sources by Stéphanie Pillonca
