= Catherine Haduca =

Belgian model and actress

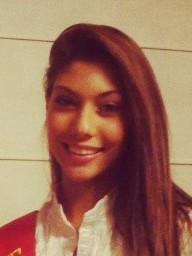
- Catherine Haduca in 2014
- Born: Belgium
- Education: IAFT
- Occupations: Model, actress
- Height: 173 cm (5 ft 8 in)

Catherine Haduca is a Belgian-Filipina model, actress and beauty pageant titleholder who was crowned Miss Liège 2014. She represented her province at Miss Belgium 2014. At the age of 15, Catherine won the public award at Top Model Belgium 2006. She was crowned 2nd runner-up at Miss Philippine-Europe Supermodel 2007 held in Antwerp, Belgium and won the best in swimsuit award. Catherine became Miss Philippine Europe International 2009 in Germany and Miss photogenic. She joined Ford Models Supermodel of the World Philippines 2013 in Manila, Philippines and won the photogenic award together with Masters School for models classes. She became the 1st runner up at the Hair Asia 23rd national open championship in the Philippines. Ms. Haduca won several model competitions such as GINI, the ultimate ice breaker and Jack Link's Europe model search. In 2013, she became GINI's new face and Jack's girl brand ambassador 2015. She was selected as a national finalist to represent Belgium at the World Championships of Performing Arts 2015 in Los Angeles, United States. In 2018, Ms. Haduca was crowned Miss World Beauty & Talent 3rd runner-up in South-Korea and received the Miss waves award. Haduca appeared in French features films such as J'ai perdu Albert, Rattrapage, Le jour attendra and Raid Dingue. She also starred in the film The Bouncer with Jean-Claude Van Damme.

== Early life and education ==
Catherine Haduca was born on 12 May 1991 in Liège, Belgium. She speaks English and French. Her father is Belgian and her mother Filipina. Catherine has French, German and Italian origins from her father and Thaï, Myanmar origins from her mother. She attended baby jazz and ballet classes when she was three and took drama classes in primary school. At the age of 13, Haduca called herself a modeling agency saying she wanted to become a model. She then walked her first runway and worked for l'Oréal. In 2014, she received a scholarship and moved to London, United Kingdom to study musical theater. In 2016, she graduated in acting for film and television from the IAFT academy. Her hobbies are modeling, acting, dancing, singing and traveling. In December 2018, Catherine was granted an O-1 extraordinary ability artist visa by the USCIS. She is now based in New York City.

== Miss Belgium 2014 ==
Haduca crowned Miss Liège won the bikini award in Miss Belgium 2014 and represented the province of Liège. She was in the top 12 finalists.

== Filmography ==
| Year | Title | Role | Director |
|---|---|---|---|
| 2011 | La Chance de ma vie | Guest | Nicolas Cuche |
| 2013 | Le jour attendra | Flight attendant | Edgar Marie |
| 2013 | Marge d'erreur | Barman | Joël Santoni |
| 2014 | Être | Customer | Fara Sene |
| 2014 | Supercondriaque | Neighbour | Dany Boon |
| 2017 | Raid dingue | Waitress | Dany Boon |
| 2017 | Rattrapage | Student | Tristan Seguela |
| 2018 | A girl from Mogadishu | Flight attendant | Mary McGuckian |
| 2018 | The bouncer | Girlfriend | Julien Leclercq |
