= Amare amaro =

2018 film by Julien Paolini

- Theatrical release poster
- Directed by: Julien Paolini
- Written by: Samy Baaroun; Julien Paolini
- Produced by: Julien Paolini; Clément Lecomte; Angelo Laudisa; Syrus Shahidi
- Starring: Syrus Shahidi; Celeste Casciaro; Tony Sperandeo
- Cinematography: Tristan Chenais
- Edited by: Gwen Ghelid
- Music by: Pasquale Filastò
- Production companies: La Réserve; Rosebud Entertainment Pictures; Scirocco Films; Picseyes; Soldats; 1050 Partners; Wattson
- Distributed by: DHR Distribution / À Vif Cinémas (France); 102 Distribution (Italy)
- Release dates: 2 October 2018 (Saint-Jean-de-Luz); 19 February 2020 (France)
- Running time: 90 minutes
- Countries: France; Italy
- Language: Italian

Amare amaro is a 2018 drama film co-written and directed by Julien Paolini in his feature-length directorial debut. A modern retelling of the tragedy of Antigone, it stars Syrus Shahidi as a man who fights to bury his brother in a Sicilian village. The supporting cast includes Celeste Casciaro and Tony Sperandeo. The film is a French and Italian co-production and was shot on location in Sicily.

== Plot ==
Gaetano is a taciturn young man who has returned to his native Sicily to run the family bakery. He cares for his ailing father but receives no help from his older brother Giosuè, a local petty criminal. Due to their half-French background, they are regarded as outsiders by locals, who nickname Gaetano "il francese". Giosuè is killed one day in an incident which causes the deaths of two others, including the village priest. Gaetano nonetheless decides he must give his brother a proper burial. He is confronted with the town's powerful mayor Enza, who refuses him permission to enter Giosuè into the family tomb. His stubborn personality pushes him to defy their orders and to honor his family instead, regardless of any dangerous consequences. The inevitable conflict is further complicated by Gaetano's romantic relationship with Anna, the mayor's daughter.

== Cast ==
- Syrus Shahidi as Gaetano
- Celeste Casciaro as Enza
- Tony Sperandeo as Maresciallo
- Ciro Petrone as Bebeto
- Dino Favuzza as Giani
- Fosco Perinti as The Father
- Virginia Perroni as Anna
- Francesco Russo as Vaniglia
- Giuditta Perriera as Lucia
- Gabriele Arena as Carlo
- Paolo Brancati as Tonio
- Giuseppe Lo Nardo as Giuseppe
- Lorenzo Randazzo as Andrea

== Production ==
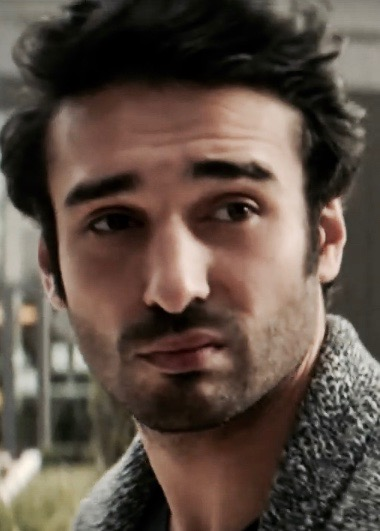
Syrus Shahidi

Amare amaro is the feature-length debut of French-Italian filmmaker Julien Paolini. The film combines elements of the crime and thriller genres with a nocturnal atmosphere and with characteristics reminiscent of Western films. The role of Gaetano was imagined for Syrus Shahidi. It was developed to highlight the character's imposing presence contrasted with his taciturn and stubborn qualities.

The film was produced by La Réserve, Rosebud Entertainment Pictures and Scirocco Films, in co-production with Picseyes, Soldats, 1050 Partners and Wattson. The production received financial support from the Sicilia Film Commission. The film was shot on location in the Metropolitan City of Palermo, where principal photography began on 30 January 2018 in the town of Balestrate. Other filming locations included Belmonte Mezzagno, Carini, Capaci, Terrasini, the city of Palermo and Cinisi. Filming continued until 18 February 2018. It was produced under the working title Amare la terra amara.

== Release ==
Amare amaro was presented in competition at the Saint-Jean-de-Luz International Film Festival, where it had its world premiere on 2 October 2018. Later that same month, Amare amaro won the Grand Prix at the Festival Polar de Cognac. In July 2019, it was screened as an international premiere at the 65th Taormina Film Fest. In October 2019, it screened at the Villerupt Italian Film Festival. It was also selected as a Focus on Italy screening at the 2019 Vancouver International Film Festival.

The film was theatrically released in France on 19 February 2020, distributed by DHR. It was released on Prime Video on 14 February 2021, distributed by 102 Distribution.

== Reception ==
Amare amaro received an average rating of 3.3 out of 5 stars on the French website AlloCiné, based on 8 reviews. Télérama critic Pierre Murat hailed the film as a great success. Guillemette Odicino, also of Télérama, praised the film's "unique humor" and deemed Paolini to be a "young director to follow". L'Express agreed, writing, "Dry and without an ounce of embellishment, Amare amaro reveals the talents of Julien Paolini as a filmmaker. A director to watch carefully."

Xavier Leherpeur of L'Obs praised the screenplay as skilled and daring, but felt the film's mise-en-scène was "a little too rigid and austere". Le Figaro wrote that "Bits of Greek tragedy, vaguely mafia drama and Italian comedy are not enough to make a film that holds up. A shame, because the actors are good and the cinemaphotography attractive." Bruno Deruisseau of Les Inrockuptibles wrote, "Despite an awkward soundtrack and an exceedingly obvious desire to "craft beautiful shots", the mise-en-scène is illustrated by an asceticism which suits the tragedy well. The film is particularly worthy for the revelation of the Franco-Syrian actor Syrus Shahidi in the role of Antigone." Stéphanie Belpêche of Le Journal du Dimanche criticised the pacing as dragging on and the screenplay for being "not very original", but wrote that "it has the merit of revealing the ridiculousness of a situation which will inevitably end in blood".
