= Un moment d'égarement =

Un moment d'égarement may refer to:

- Un moment d'égarement (1977 film), directed by Claude Berri
- Un moment d'égarement (2015 film), directed by Jean-François Richet
