= Sabrina Ouazani =

French actress of Algerian descent (born 1988)

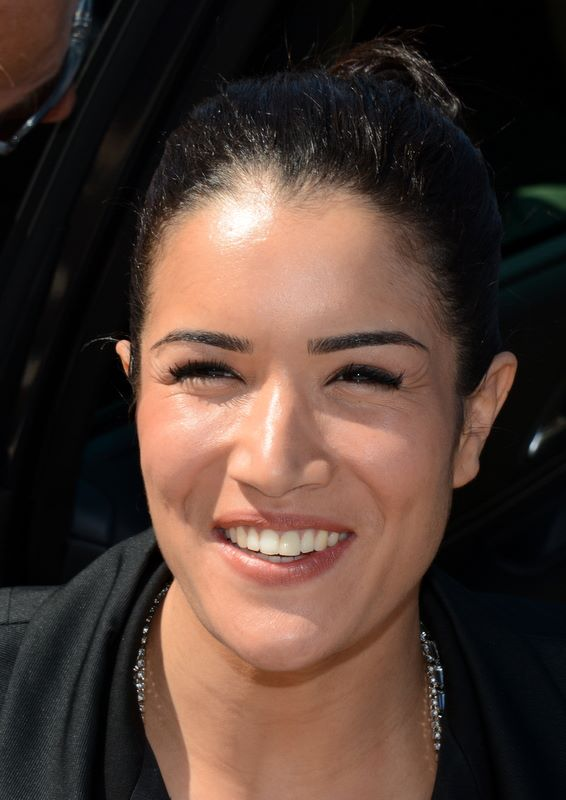
- Ouazani at the 2013 Cannes Film Festival
- Born: 6 December 1988 (age 36); Saint-Denis, Seine-Saint-Denis, France
- Occupation: Actress
- Years active: 2003–present

Sabrina Ouazani (born 6 December 1988) is a French actress of Algerian descent. She is best known internationally for her performance as Frida in Games of Love and Chance and as Charlotte Ben Smires in Netflix's hit rom-com series The Hook Up Plan.

== Career ==
Joined by her mother in the casting of Games of Love and Chance, Sabrina Ouazani was featured by director Abdellatif Kechiche, who shot this movie in the neighborhood of Franc-Moisin, a few hundred meters from his city of residence, Balzac apartment block 4000 in La Courneuve (a Paris suburb). For this first role, she was nominated for a César Award for Most Promising Actress in 2005.

== Filmography ==
| Year | Title | Role | Director | Notes |
|---|---|---|---|---|
| 2003 | Games of Love and Chance | Frida | Abdellatif Kechiche | International Istanbul Film Festival - Special Prize - Ensemble acting Mons International Festival of Love Films - Best Actress; Nominated - César Award for Most Promising Actress |
| 2004 | 3 petites filles | Lilia | Jean-Loup Hubert | |
| 2005 | Temps morts | | Éléonore Weber | Short |
| 2005 | Louis Page | Yasmine Toualbi | Badreddine Mokrani | TV series (1 episode) |
| 2006 | Avenue Montaigne | Rachida | Danièle Thompson | |
| 2007 | The Secret of the Grain | Olfa | Abdellatif Kechiche (2) | |
| 2007 | J'attends quelqu'un | Farida | Jérôme Bonnell | |
| 2007 | Nuits d'Arabie | Yamina | Paul Kieffer | |
| 2007 | Ravages | Radhija | Christophe Lamotte | TV movie |
| 2007 | Une histoire à ma fille | Fadela | Chantal Picault | TV movie |
| 2007 | Reporters | Assia | Suzanne Fenn & Ivan Strasburg | TV series (1 episode) |
| 2008 | Paris | Khadija | Cédric Klapisch | |
| 2008 | Tangerine | Amira | Irene von Alberti | |
| 2008 | Le soleil des ternes | Touria | Eric Bu | Short |
| 2008 | Garçon manqué | Nadia | David Delrieux | TV movie |
| 2009 | Adieu Gary | Nejma | Nassim Amaouche | |
| 2009 | I'm Glad My Mother Is Alive | The cashier | Claude Miller & Nathan Miller | |
| 2009 | L'année de l'Algérie | Myriam | May Bouhada | Short |
| 2009 | Commissaire Magellan | Nadia | Laurent Levy | TV series (1 episode) |
| 2010 | Of Gods and Men | Rabbia | Xavier Beauvois | |
| 2010 | Tout ce qui brille | Sandra | Géraldine Nakache & Hervé Mimran | |
| 2010 | Dom Juan's Street | Leila | Jérôme Maldhé | Short |
| 2010 | Strike | | Saadi Belgaid | Short |
| 2010 | Frères | Farida | Virginie Sauveur | TV movie |
| 2010 | Histoires de vies | Samra | Julia Cordonnier | TV series (1 episode) |
| 2010 | Marion Mazzano | Aïcha Nahit | Marc Angelo | TV series (2 episodes) |
| 2010 | Les vivants et les morts | Saïda | Gérard Mordillat | TV series (8 episodes) |
| 2011 | The Source | Rachida | Radu Mihăileanu | |
| 2011 | Haram | Leïla | Benoît Martin | Short |
| 2011 | La fille de sa mère | Norah | Eric Bu (2) | Short |
| 2011 | Le chant des sirènes | Samia | Laurent Herbiet | TV movie |
| 2011 | 5 fois Nathalie Baye | Rosa | Edouard Deluc | TV series (1 episode) |
| 2012 | Inch'Allah | Rand | Anaïs Barbeau-Lavalette | Jutra Award for Best Supporting Actress; Nominated - Genie Award for Best Performance by an Actress in a Supporting Role |
| 2012 | On the Other Side of the Tracks | Yasmine | David Charhon | |
| 2012 | Fat Bottomed Girls Rule the World | Leila | Flora Desprats | Short |
| 2012 | La place du Maure | Nuria | Lisa Diaz | Short |
| 2012 | Passage du Désir | Khadija | Jérôme Foulon | TV movie |
| 2012 | Manipulations | Philippine Maklouf | Laurent Herbiet (2) | TV movie |
| 2012 | La collection donne de la voi(e)x | Yasmine | Ernesto Oña | TV series (1 episode) |
| 2012 | Rupture mode d'emploi | Samia | Sébastien Onomo | TV series (1 episode) |
| 2013 | The Past | Naïma | Asghar Farhadi | Nominated - CinEuphoria Award for Best Ensemble |
| 2013 | Mohamed Dubois | Sabrina Kherab | Ernesto Oña (2) | |
| 2014 | May Allah Bless France! | Nawel | Abd al Malik | |
| 2014 | L'Oranais | Nawel | Lyes Salem | |
| 2014 | De guerre lasse | Katia | Olivier Panchot | |
| 2015 | The Squad | Nadia | Benjamin Rocher | |
| 2015 | Under My Skin | Élisa Corone | Stéphane Caput & Loïc Pottier | Short |
| 2016 | Pattaya | Lilia | Franck Gastambide | |
| 2016 | Team Spirit | Sofia | Christophe Barratier | |
| 2016 | Toril | | Laurent Teyssier | |
| 2016 | Vole comme un papillon | | Jérôme Maldhé (2) | |
| 2016 | Trainee Day | Nadia Choukri | Marc Fitoussi | |
| 2016 | Open at Night | Faeza | Édouard Baer | |
| 2017 | The Blue Mauritius | Celine | | |
| 2018 | Taxi 5 | Samia | Franck Gastambide | Produced by Luc Besson |
| 2018 | The Hook Up Plan | Charlotte | Noémie Saglio, Julien Teisseire, Chris Lang | Netflix TV Series |
| 2021 | You Resemble Me | Adult Hasna #2 | Dina Amer | |
| 2022 | Kung Fu Zohra | Zohra Hamidi | Mabrouk El Mechri | |
| 2022 | The Takedown | Yasmine | Louis Leterrier | |
| 2022 | Les Folies fermières | Bonnie | Jean-Pierre Améris | |
| 2023 | Karmapolice | Maman | Julien Paolini | |
| 2024 | Kali | Lisa | Julien Seri | |

== Theatre ==
| Year | Title | Author | Director | Notes |
|---|---|---|---|---|
| 2009 | Ruptures | Caroline Nietsweski | Caroline Nietsweski | Théâtre Montmartre Galabru |
| 2013 | Amour sur place ou à emporter | Noom Diawara & Amelle Chahbi | Fabrice Eboué | Théâtre du Gymnase Marie Bell |
