= Julien Paolini =

French-Italian film director and screenwriter

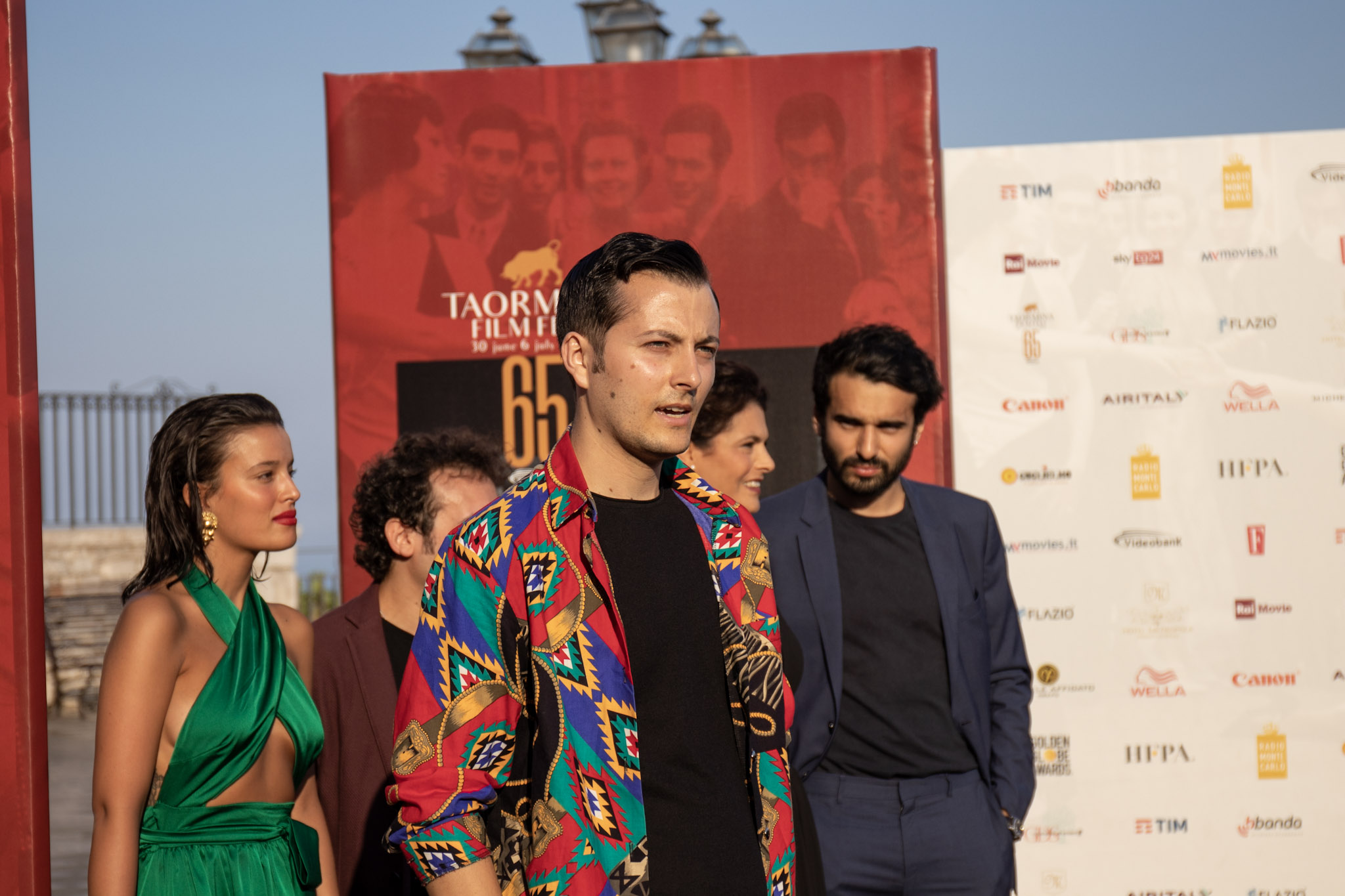
- Paolini at the 2019 Taormina Film Fest
- Born: 20 June 1986 (age 39); Florence, Italy
- Occupations: Film director; screenwriter
- Years active: 2009–present

Julien Paolini (born 20 June 1986) is a French-Italian film director and screenwriter. In 2018, he made his feature directorial debut with Amare amaro. His second feature, Karmapolice, was released in 2023.

== Early life ==
Paolini was born on 20 June 1986 in Florence, Italy, to a Sicilian father and a French mother. He moved to Colombes, a northwestern suburb of Paris. He began writing at a very young age, starting with short stories.

== Career ==
Between 2008 and 2015, he wrote and directed a series of short films shot in France, Africa and the United States. He directed actors such as Shiloh Fernandez, Hugo Becker, Bernie Bonvoisin and Christophe Salengro. The films received several awards and was screened at international festivals such as the Clermont-Ferrand International Short Film Festival, Panafrican Film and Television Festival of Ouagadougou, International Film Festival Rotterdam, Montreal World Film Festival and were purchased and broadcast by France Télévisions, Canal+ and Orange Cinéma Séries. In 2012, he screened his short film African Race at Les Pépites du Cinéma in La Courneuve, a festival sponsored by Michel Gondry.

In October 2018, he presented his feature-length directorial debut Amare amaro in competition at the Saint-Jean-de-Luz International Film Festival. Shot in Sicily, the Italian-language film recounts the journey of a French baker who fights to bury his murdered brother in a Sicilian village which forbids him from doing so. In the film, he directed actors Syrus Shahidi, Tony Sperandeo and Celeste Casciaro. The drama is a reimagining of the tragedy of Antigone in the form of a nocturnal crime thriller with elements reminiscent of Western films. Télérama critic Pierre Murat hailed the film as a great success. L'Express compared it to the gangster films of Martin Scorsese. Amare amaro won the Grand Prix at the Festival Polar de Cognac. In July 2019, it was screened as an international premiere at the 65th Taormina Film Fest, where Paolini said, "As an Italian emigrant in France who grew up between the two countries, my films all tell the story of modern multi-identity".

His second feature film, Karmapolice, was written in collaboration with Manolis Mavropoulos and Syrus Shahidi. Shot in French, it stars Shahidi as a policeman consumed by guilt who works in the Château Rouge neighbourhood of Paris when his neighbor is allegedly kidnapped by a slumlord. Alexis Manenti and Karidja Touré star in the supporting roles. Paolini drew inspiration from French comics, including those by Charles Burns, Lewis Trondheim, Joann Sfar and Emmanuel Larcenet. The film premiered in competition at the Festival Polar de Cognac in October 2023, where it earned Paolini his second Grand Prix. It was theatrically released in France on 17 July 2024. Critics praised Karmapolice, and saw it as "the legacy of a certain New York underground cinema, from early Scorsese to the Safdie brothers, via Lynch's Blue Velvet". Cineuropa wrote that Paolini confirmed his "singularity" as a director.

In October 2024, Julien served as a jury member for the Festival Polar de Cognac.

== Filmography ==
=== Feature films ===
Year	Title	Director	Writer	Producer	Notes
2018	Amare amaro	Yes	Yes	Yes	Co-written with Samy Baaroun; Co-produced with Clément Lecomte, Angelo Laudisa, Syrus Shahidi
2023	Karmapolice	Yes	Yes	Yes	Co-written with Manolis Mavropoulos and Syrus Shahidi; Co-produced with Marie Etchegoyen, Syrus Shahidi, Yann Girard

=== Short films ===
Year	Title
2009	Réveil d'un mouton
2010	On braque pas les banques avec des fourchettes en plastique
2011	Tuer l'ennui
2012	African Race
2014	The Hitchiker (L'Autostoppeur)
2015	Bangs in My Chest
