= Versus (2019 film) =

- Theatrical release poster
- Directed by: François Valla
- Screenplay by: Erwan Augoyard; Nicolas Journet; Sophie Kovess-Brun; François Valla
- Produced by: Nicolas Journet; François Valla
- Starring: Jules Pélissier; Jérémie Duvall; Karidja Touré; Lola Le Lann; Michaël Cohen
- Cinematography: Tristan Tortuyaux; Romain Wilhelm
- Edited by: Walter Mauriot
- Music by: Benoît de Villeneuve; Benjamin Morando
- Production company: Playground Films
- Distributed by: Wayna Pitch
- Release date: May 8, 2019
- Running time: 80 minutes
- Country: France
- Language: French

Versus is a 2019 French drama-thriller film directed by François Valla. The movie stars Jules Pélissier, Jérémie Duvall, Karidja Touré and Lola Le Lann.

== Synopsis ==
Inspired by a true story, Achille, a handsome Parisian teenager from a wealthy family, is the victim of a violent assault. He is sent to his aunt's, Brigitte for a vacation by the sea to rebuild. There he meets an angry young man, Brian who works for the golf club. From their confrontation will spring their true nature, from their struggle will be born a killer.

== Cast ==
- Jérémie Duvall as Achille
- Jules Pélissier as Brian
- Karidja Touré as Camille
- Lola Le Lann as Léa
- Victor Belmondo as Kevin
- Matilda Marty-Giraut as Noémie
- Rani Bheemuck as Kali
- Michaël Cohen as Léa's father
- Benjamin Baffie as Gabriel
- Nathalie Sportiello as Brigitte
- Inès Melab as Policewoman
