= Earth and Blood =

2020 French-language film

- Film poster
- Directed by: Julien Leclercq
- Starring: Sami Bouajila; Eriq Ebouaney; Samy Seghir
- Production companies: Labyrinthe Films; Umedia
- Distributed by: Netflix
- Release date: April 17, 2020
- Running time: 80 minutes
- Countries: France; Belgium
- Language: French

Earth and Blood (French: La Terre et le Sang) is a 2020 French action thriller film directed by Julien Leclercq and starring Sami Bouajila, Eriq Ebouaney and Samy Seghir. The film is about a violent showdown at an isolated sawmill that occurs when a young employee hides eight kilos of a gang's stolen cocaine at the mill. When the heavily armed gang members come to recover their drugs, the sawmill owner stages a last stand to protect his teenage daughter.

It was released on April 18, 2020, by Netflix.

== Plot ==
During a heist at a police station's evidence room, two out of four criminals end up dead. The remaining two escape with eight kilos of cocaine. Meanwhile, sawmill owner Saïd goes through a CT scan and finds out he has carcinoma and not long to live. He visits his sister-in-law and tells her about his plans to sell his sawmill that was owned previously by her father, and assures her she'll get her share. One of his employees, a young man named Yanis who is out on parole, meets up with his half-brother and one of the criminals who survived the heist. Deciding not to hand over the stolen drugs to the drug lord Adama, the half-brother tells Yanis to hide the drugs at the sawmill. Yanis switches cars with him and hides the drugs at the sawmill.

Saïd tells his speech-and hearing-impaired teenage daughter Sarah about his plans to use the money from selling the sawmill for her postsecondary studies. He meets a buyer and shows him the sawmill. Meanwhile, an enraged Adama captures the two criminals who survived the heist and kills one of them on the spot by snapping his neck. Saïd starts to suspect Yanis is up to something and after interrogating him, he finds the drugs hidden in a truck at the sawmill. Locking Yanis inside the sawmill and telling Sarah to stay indoors, he takes a shotgun and drives away for help. He circles back when he learns that the gang is on its way.

Noticing Saïd, Adama's brother Moussa goes to the sawmill to retrieve the drugs. Sarah goes near the spot where Yanis is locked, and Adama's brother threatens them with a gun, before being shot by Saïd. Freeing Yanis, Saïd takes him and Sarah inside their house. Adama arrives, and one of his men cuts off the telephone lines, severing their contact with the cops. Yanis tells Saïd the cops will take 20 minutes to arrive. Adama watches his brother die in his arms, kills the second criminal who betrayed him and starts looking for the trio.

Saïd hands Yanis a shotgun and sends Sarah to escape through the woods with Yanis while he plans to distract the gang. Seeing the two run, one of the henchmen chases after them. Saïd, on the other hand, lures many of the gang into traps and eliminates them one by one. However, he finds himself locked inside the sawmill which the gang soon sets on fire. Saïd escapes from the sawmill and gets a heavy log-loading vehicle, and flees into the woods. When a gang member chases him in a car, Saïd uses the sawmill vehicle's weight to destroy the car and kill the gang member.

Meanwhile, Yanis and Sarah continue to flee in the woods, pursued by a henchman. Yanis and Sarah hide in a shed. When the henchman finds their hiding spot, Yanis tries to strangle the henchman, but Yanis gets stabbed. Sarah runs to a nearby farmhouse for help. When Saïd rushes into help Yanis, Saïd incapacitates the henchman, but Yanis dies. When Adama and another henchman arrive, Saïd uses the tied up henchman to distract them and kills the new henchman, but Adama returns fire, seriously wounding Saïd.

Adama holds Saïd at gunpoint, before revealing his plans for avenging his brother's death by killing Sarah. Leaving Saïd lying wounded in the shed, Adama goes to the farmhouse. Adama shoots the old man in the farmhouse who was helping Sarah. Pursued by Adama, she is cornered in an upper floor and jumps from the building. Adama captures her and tries to snap her neck, before Saïd arrives and kills him with an axe. Saïd falls down and Sarah holds him as the police helicopter arrives.

== Cast ==
- Sami Bouajila as Saïd
- Eriq Ebouaney as Adama
- Samy Seghir as Yanis
- Sofia Lesaffre as Sarah
- Redouanne Harjane as Mehdi
- Oumar Diolo as Alassane
- Eric Kabongo as Yao
- Anis Benbatoul as Kouame
- Blaise Afonso as Koffi
- Mario Stasseyns as Drissa
- Gaëtan Lejeune as Eric
- Lionël Ruzindana as Süleyman
- Eric De Staercke as Lefèvre
- Edson Anibal as Moussa
- Luc Van Grunderbeeck as Moriott

== Release ==
Earth and Blood was released on April 17, 2020 on Netflix.

== Reception ==
John Serba's review in Decider calls it another example of director Leclercq's "minimalist thrillers" and says it is like a French take on Rambo: Last Blood. He praises Bouajila and Lesaffre's acting but says the film lacks a "decent screenplay". He says the film is "[s]o lean, it feels like it's missing a few scenes" and notes that it focuses on a "display of somewhat tedious sadistic bloodlust that could all have been avoided" if Said had been logical and called the police. He criticizes the "indulgent slo-mo" during action scenes, the "pulsing" soundtrack, and the flat, bland characters, leading him to give a "skip it" recommendation with a C-minus rating.

Peter Bradshaw from The Guardian says this "heavy artillery action flick runs out of ammo", suggesting that Leclerq "seems to run out of ideas". Bradshaw says that when the "inevitable" deployment of the sawmill's motorized blades against the attackers occurs, "it isn't sufficiently ingenious or climactic". Bradshaw says the characters are "sketched in too quickly" and it is cut so short that it plays "like the truncated version of a much longer and more thought-through film".

Fabien Lemercier's review in Cineuropa says the film is fast-paced and "punchily transpos[es] the codes of the western to a story about gangs and a solitary hero, boss of a sawmill...". He notes that the "viril[e] universes of lumberjacks and thugs was already explored in a different manner in Robert Enrico’s The Wise Guys (1965). He says the director "efficiently explores" the story using realism, creating a "visual mood", the sawmill setting, suspense and an accelerating rhythm and pacing.
