= Welcome to Germany (2016 film) =

- Theatrical release poster
- Directed by: Simon Verhoeven
- Written by: Simon Verhoeven
- Produced by: Quirin Berg; Stefan Gärtner; Max Wiedemann; Michael Verhoeven
- Starring: Senta Berger; Heiner Lauterbach; Florian David Fitz; Palina Rojinski; Elyas M'Barek; Eric Kabongo; Esther Kuhn
- Cinematography: Jo Heim
- Edited by: Denis Bachter; Stefan Essl
- Music by: Gary Go
- Production companies: Wiedemann & Berg Filmproduktion GmbH & Co. KG; Sentana Film; Seven Pictures Film
- Distributed by: Warner Bros. Pictures
- Release date: 3 November 2016
- Running time: 116 minutes
- Country: Germany
- Language: German
- Box office: $28 million

Welcome to Germany (German: Willkommen bei den Hartmanns) is a 2016 German comedy film written and directed by Simon Verhoeven.

The film was released on November 3, by Warner Bros. Pictures. it grossed more than US$20 million in Germany.

== Plot ==
The Hartmanns, an upper-middle-class Munich family, include Angelika, a former school principal, and her husband Richard, a prominent orthopedic surgeon, both in their sixties; their daughter Sofie, 31, an unmarried permanent student currently studying psychology; her older brother Philipp, a successful business lawyer undergoing a messy divorce, and his 12-year-old son Bastian (Basti). They live in a large house in a posh suburb.

Richard has difficulty facing the aging process. He refuses to retire and undergoes face-lifting procedures performed by his friend, the cosmetic surgeon and philanderer Dr. Sascha Heinrich. Angelika is criticized by her husband for her starry-eyed idealism.

One day, at a refugee center set up in a container structure, Angelika donates used clothes and encounters her former colleague Heike Broscher, who teaches German language courses. Since no additional volunteers are needed in the center, Angelika decides to adopt a refugee. She discusses the plan with her family over dinner. Initially, Richard and Philipp reject the idea categorically, but Sofie takes her mother's side. Angelika has already made an appointment with Bernd Bader, the head of the refugee center. Richard reluctantly accompanies her, and after several families are presented to them, they finally agree to take in Diallo, a lone Nigerian in his 20s.

Meanwhile, Richard is annoyed at work; he repeatedly snubs one of his subordinates, the ambitious and handsome young Dr. Tarek Berger, eventually leading to an explosive dispute within earshot of other employees. Richard grabs his heart with a distorted face after each of his tantrums. Tarek, in turn, leads a group of refugees in a weekly jogging and workout session, in which Diallo also participates. Richard and Tarek discover they had actually met two decades before, at a birthday party of Sofie's, when the nine-year-old Tarek accidentally destroyed a valuable vase. Richard is resentful and unforgiving toward Tarek.

Diallo, who willingly works in the garden and around the house, develops a good relationship with Angelika. Still, he cannot understand many things about the Germans, such as the fact that Sofie is unmarried and childless at 31. When Basti makes a hip-hop video with his friends at school, Diallo acts as a full-time supervisor. Shooting the video almost gets Basti expelled, but Philipp is able to prevent that. Basti also has bad grades, something Philipp deplores but does little about. Otherwise, Philipp has no time for his son, as he has to constantly fly to Shanghai, where he is heading an important project. Rushing to his flight yet again, he defies airport security and ends up in psychiatric care, where he's diagnosed with burnout.

Basti gives a presentation on refugee issues at school, including Diallo, who describes how his village was destroyed and his family killed by Boko Haram.

Heike has organized a celebration for Diallo at the Hartmanns’ home, to which she invites members of an African group and a circus, complete with a zebra. A neighbor calls the police because of the noise. The officers notice that the wild party was being thrown for the asylum seeker Diallo.

Meanwhile, Sofie has been stalked by Kurt, a cab driver who had picked her up after spotting her being harassed on the street by some immigrants. Kurt thinks Diallo is an Islamist. With a few friends, Kurt pickets the Hartmann house with torches and "security" calls. A fight erupts between the two, and after the police are summoned by the neighbors again, Sofie has Kurt hauled away as an intruder.

Diallo wants to fix up the two singles, Sofie and Tarek, but each tells him that they want to find a partner themselves, as is customary in Germany. The two eventually meet by chance and fall in love with each other. At a disco, they encounter Richard, who declares he "wants to enjoy life" and is introduced to younger women by Sascha. Richard has since moved out after differences with Angelika at home. Diallo meets him by the river and tells him to go home to Angelika, who belongs to him. Richard corrects Diallo, saying that at the most she belongs with him.

Diallo's asylum application is rejected. Bernd Bader files an appeal for him, and a court hearing is scheduled. Basti calls his father in Shanghai and pleads with him to fly home to represent Diallo. At first, Philipp refuses, but then he has a change of heart, leaving his assistant to lead the contract negotiations and heading straight to the court when the judge wants to deliver the verdict.

Philipp still works on Diallo's behalf and proposes viewing the video of Basti's presentation on the smartphone. But this had already happened, as Basti had this idea, and the judge was prepared to decide in favor of recognizing Diallo's asylum petition anyway. When Richard returns to Angelika, while Tarek introduces himself to her, once again there is a demonstration of right-wing extremists outside the house. Meanwhile, Richard suffers a heart attack, and Tarek provides First Aid. Diallo is now being monitored by an anti-terrorist unit using a drone camera. They misjudge the situation and send a task force to storm the house. When the commanders see that Diallo is helpful and not threatening, the raid is canceled. Diallo's asylum petition is granted, and he celebrates with the Hartmanns, Heike, and Tarek.

== Cast ==
- Senta Berger as Angelika Hartmann
- Heiner Lauterbach as Dr. Richard Hartmann
- Florian David Fitz as Philipp Hartmann
- Palina Rojinski as Sofie Hartmann
- Eric Kabongo as Diallo Makabouri
- Elyas M'Barek as Dr. Tarek Berger
- Uwe Ochsenknecht as Dr. Sascha Heinrich
- Ulrike Kriener as Heike Broscher
- Eisi Gulp as Bernd Bader
- Marinus Hohmann as Basti
- Thilo Prothmann as Kurt Blümlein
- Esther Kuhn as Clarissa
- Ulla Geiger as Nachbarin
- Wolfgang Maria Bauer as Schickdorf

== Awards ==
- Lola German Film Awards - (2016) Most Successful Film for Welcome to Germany
- Bavarian Film Awards - (2016) Best Production award and Audience Award for Welcome to Germany
- Bogey Awards - (2016) for 1 million tickets sold within 10 days of release for Welcome to Germany
- Goldene Leinwand - (2016) for over 3 million tickets sold within 18 months of release for Welcome to Germany
- AZ Stern des Jahres - (2016) for Welcome to Germany
- Peace Prize of German Film "The Bridge" (Friedenspreis des Deutschen Films "Die Brücke") - (2017) for Welcome to Germany
- Bambi - (2017) Best German Film for Welcome to Germany
- GQ Men of the Year Awards - (2017) Special Achievement Award for Welcome to Germany
- Jupiter Award - (2017) Best German Film for Welcome to Germany
- European Film Award - (2017) Best Comedy (nominated) for Welcome to Germany
- German Comedy Awards - (2017) Best Film Comedy for Welcome to Germany
- Günther Rohrbach Preis - (2017) Best Screenplay for Welcome to Germany
- European Union Film Festival Toronto- (2018) Audience Award
