= Naël Marandin =

French actor and film director

- Born: June 23, 1981 (42 years old); Paris
- Occupations: Film director, actor, screenwriter

Naël Marandin (born June 23, 1981) is a French actor and film director.

== Biography ==
Marandin started acting as a child, he played in such films as Les allumettes suédoises (The Swedish matches) and La ville dont le prince est un enfant (The city whose prince is a child). After that he took a break from acting and studied political science. For several years, he lived in China and Tibet. Upon return to France, he emerged as a video maker and film director, releasing two prized shorts: Foreign Bodies and No neighborhood.

His first feature, She walks, was released in 2015. The film tells the story of Lin Aiyu, an illegal Chinese immigrant living in Belleville, who works as a prostitute hiding it from her teenage daughter. At the project stage, the film won the Centre national du cinéma et de l'image animée (CNC) project competition and received a grant for production.

His second feature, Beasts (La terre des hommes), was also supported by the CNC. The screenplay was co-written with Marion Doussot and Marion Desseigne-Ravel. The movie was well received by critics, it won the Best Cinematography Prize at the Tallinn Black Nights Festival, took the Grand Prix at the 2020 Saint-Jean-de-Luz Film Festival and at the Saint-Jean-de-Luz IFF, won Best Acting and the Audience Award at the 36th Mons International Film Festival, and the 2020 Critics’ Week label of the 2020 Cannes Film Festival.
