= Eric Kabongo =

Belgian actor of Congolese descent

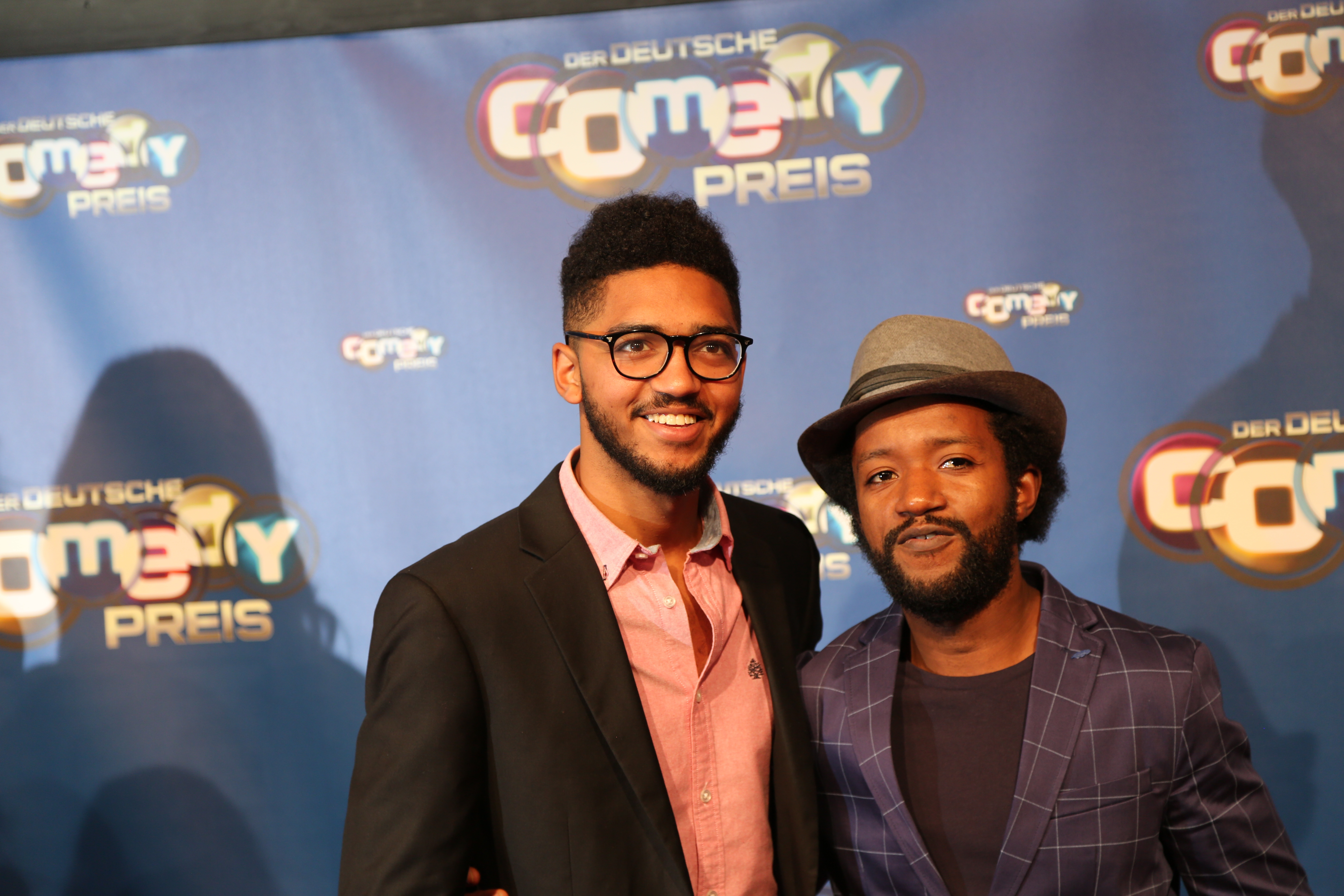
- Kabongo in right
- Born: Eric Kabongo Ilunga; 21 May 1984 (age 42); Kinshasa, Zaire
- Occupations: Actor, singer, dubbing actor, model, musician
- Years active: 2013–present
- Height: 168 cm (5 ft 6 in)
- Musical career
- Genres: Hip Hop; Rhythm and blues
- Instrument: Vocals
- Years active: 2015–present

Eric Kabongo Ilunga (born 21 May 1984), is a Belgian actor and singer with a Congolese descent. He is best known for the roles in the films Welcome to Germany, Sawah and Third Wedding.

== Personal life ==
He was born on 21 May 1984 in Kinshasa, Zaire (currently Democratic Republic of the Congo). At the age of 13, he came to Belgium because his mother married a Belgian and settled in Flemish village in the suburbs, in Belgium. He currently lives in Waregem, West Flanders.

== Career ==
He started his career as a rapper with the stage name 'Krazy-E'. In 2013, he became an actor with an uncredited role as a train passenger in the film The Fifth Estate. In 2014, Kabongo played in the short D5R and then received a role in the critically acclaimed Belgian film Black.

In 2016, he was invited to Germany to play the role as a refugee 'Diallo' in the comedy film Welcome to Germany. With the film, he became a leading actor across Europe. In 2019, he acted in the film Sawah where he won the Golden Palm Award for Best Supporting Actor at the Queen Palm International Film Festival. In the same year, he acted in the series Rivallen und Rebellen.

In 2014, a documentary What about Eric? was released regarding his life. The documentary later won the prizes for Best Belgian documentary as well. Then the documentary Ensor won the award for the Best Flemish documentary, which was later dedicated to Kabongo by directors Lennart Stuyck and Ruben Vermeersch.

== Filmography ==
Year	Film	Role	Genre	Ref.
2013	The Fifth Estate	Train passenger	Film	
2013	Mannenharten	VIP guest	Film	
2014	The Connection	Jairzinho	Film	
2014	D5R	Sacha	TV series	
2015	Black	Krazy-E	Film	
2016	Welcome to Germany	Diallo Makabouri	Film	
2018	Third Wedding (Troisièmes noces)	Philippe	Film	
2019	Leopoldpark	Moise	Radio Drama	
2019	Rivalen und Rebellen	Dexter	TV series	
2019	Sawah	Daniel	Film	
2019	Yummy	Main Nurse	Film	
2020	Earth and Blood	Yao	Film	
TBD	Deutschland im Winter	Isa	Short film	
