= Cumgirl8 =

American post-punk indie rock band

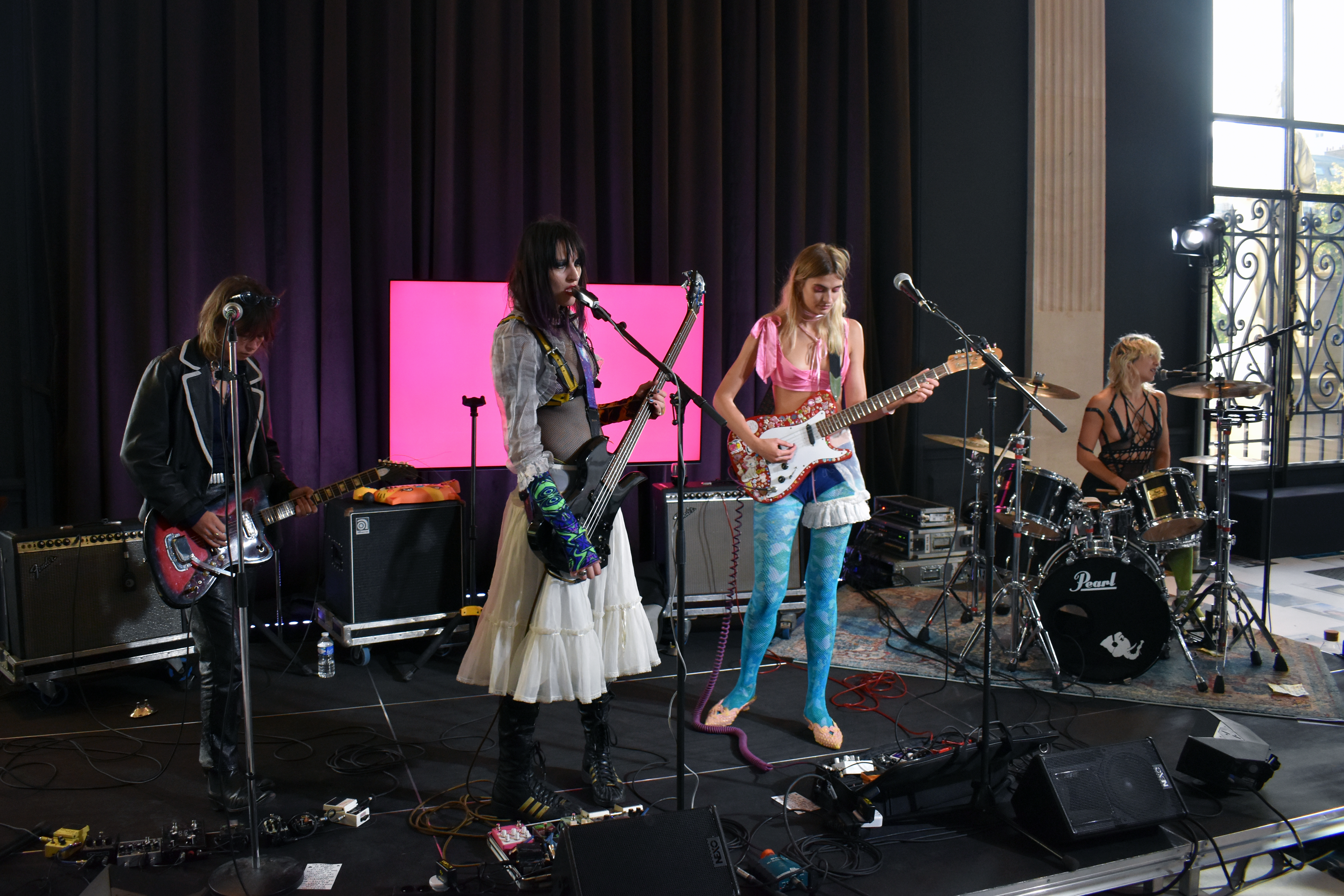
Cumgirl8 in 2022

Cumgirl8 is an American post-punk band and multi-media collective based in Manhattan, New York, founded in 2019 by Lida Fox, Veronika Vilim, Avishag Cohen Rodrigues, and Chase Lombardo (also known as Chase Noelle). Describing themselves as a "sex-positive alien amoeba entity," they create work in the fields of music, film, publishing, and fashion. Their music functions as an "outlet [for] repressed and pent-up emotions" and their style and artistic practice are shaped by an opposition to patriarchy and capitalism. They began playing their first shows and releasing songs in the months before the outbreak of the COVID-19 pandemic, and once in quarantine they created The 1–900, a lo-fi, unfiltered talk show on YouTube that delves into sociopolitical issues with guests appearing over webcam. Their debut album cumgirl8, was released under the record label muddguts on May 1, 2020. They are currently signed to prominent independent label 4AD since 2023 and released the EP phantasea pharm that August. Their second studio album, The 8th Cumming, was released on October 4, 2024.

== Discography ==
- cumgirl8 (2020)
- The 8th Cumming (2024)
