= Ganglands =

- Release poster
- Genre: Action; Crime drama; Drama
- Created by: Hamid Hlioua; Julien Leclercq
- Starring: Sami Bouajila; Tracy Gotoas; Salim Kechiouche; Samuel Jouy; Joaquim de Almeida
- Country of origin: France
- Original language: French
- No. of seasons: 2
- No. of episodes: 12

Production
- Running time: 44–51 min
- Production companies: Labyrinthe Films; Netflix

Original release
- Network: Netflix
- Release: 24 September 2021 – present

Ganglands (French: Braqueurs) is a French action crime drama television series created by Hamid Hlioua and Julien Leclercq. The first season of the series premiered on Netflix on 24 September 2021 with six episodes. The second season premiered on 17 February 2023, also with six episodes. The series shares the title of Leclercq's 2015 film Braqueurs, but while both feature Sami Bouajila as the lead robber, they share no characters or storylines.

== Premise ==
A crew of armed robbers led by Mehdi, an experienced professional, is drawn into a turf war between drug lords in Belgium after Mehdi’s teenage niece, Shaïnez, and her girlfriend, Liana, accidentally steal eight kilograms of cocaine while robbing a top dealer’s courier. Mehdi and Liana form an unlikely working partnership and a strong emotional bond while they fight for their lives and to protect their families and friends from spiraling troubles in Brussels and Antwerp.

== Cast ==
- Sami Bouajila as Yanis Zeri / Mehdi Belhadj
- Geert Van Rampelberg as Chris de Wit
- Carlos Schram as Carlos
- Tracy Gotoas as Liana
- Salim Kechiouche as Saber Djebli
- Samuel Jouy as Tony
- Nabiha Akkari as Sofia Djebli
- Joaquim de Almeida as prosecutor Almeida

== Episodes ==
No.	Title	Directed by	Written by	Original release date
1	"Episode I"	Julien Leclercq	Hamid Hlioua	24 September 2021
2	"Episode II"	Julien Leclercq	Hamid Hlioua	24 September 2021
3	"Episode III"	Julien Leclercq	Hamid Hlioua	24 September 2021
4	"Episode IV"	Julien Leclercq	Hamid Hlioua	24 September 2021
5	"Episode V"	Julien Leclercq	Hamid Hlioua	24 September 2021
6	"Episode VI"	Julien Leclercq	Hamid Hlioua	24 September 2021

== Episode I ==
An experienced heist leader robs a gold smuggling operation at a quarry with his heavily armed crew. In an unrelated situation across the city, and unbeknownst to the heist leader, his teenage niece is making money posing as a prostitute to lure men to encounters and rob them. She and a female accomplice steal a man's personal effects, but they are unaware he is a drug courier. They are dismayed to find eight kilos of cocaine in his bag. His boss, a drug baron, kidnaps the niece and demands the return of his drugs. The heist leader negotiates with the drug lord, who gives him one day to recover the cocaine.

== Episode II ==
The inexperienced teenaged robbers try to sell the cocaine to a low-level dealer, but the dealer's gang take the drugs without paying. One of the teens makes up a story about the cocaine belonging to a Moroccan drug mafia to try to scare them into returning the drugs. The heist leader tracks the teenage accomplice and her friends to an indoor RV warehouse. At the same time that he holds the accomplice at gunpoint, seeking the location of his niece, the heavily armed drug gang arrives to threaten the teen robbers. The heist leader and the teens escape in a hail of gunfire. The heist leader and the teen accomplice get the cocaine back from the drug gang. Meanwhile, the drug baron faces scheming on the part of his family members who work in his drug business. Mehdi returns the drugs to the drug lord, but the drug baron does not return the kidnapped niece; instead, he tells Medhi to steal 300 kilos of cocaine for him as it arrives in Antwerp.
