= A Bluebird in My Heart =

- Film poster
- Directed by: Jérémie Guez
- Screenplay by: Jérémie Guez
- Based on: The Dishwasher by Dannie M. Martin
- Produced by: Julie Madon; Aimee Buidine; Julien Leclercq; Jérémie Guez
- Starring: Roland Møller; Veerle Baetens; Lola Le Lann; Lubna Azabal
- Cinematography: Dimitri Karakatsanis
- Edited by: Dieter Deipendaele
- Music by: Severin Favriau
- Production companies: Cheyenne; Atchafalaya Films; Labyrinthe Films
- Distributed by: Shudder
- Release date: March 2018 (South by Southwest)
- Running time: 89 minutes
- Countries: Belgium; France
- Languages: French; English

A Bluebird in My Heart is a 2018 Belgian-French thriller drama film written and directed by Jérémie Guez and starring Roland Møller, Veerle Baetens, Lola Le Lann and Lubna Azabal. It is based on the novel The Dishwasher by Dannie M. Martin. It is also Guez's feature directorial debut.

== Synopsis ==
Attempting to lead a quiet reformed life, an ex-con (Møller) finds refuge in a motel run by a single mother (Baetens) and her daughter Clara (Le Lann). The peace and freedom he has found in this safe haven disappears when Clara is assaulted, forcing him to face his old demons.

== Cast ==
- Roland Møller - Danny
- Veerle Baetens - Laurence
- Lola Le Lann - Clara
- Lubna Azabal - Nadia

== Release ==
The film premiered at the South by Southwest Film Festival in March 2018. That same month, Shudder acquired U.S., Canada and UK/Ireland distribution rights to the film. The film was released in the United States via Shudder on November 14, 2019.

== Reception ==
The film has an 86% rating on Rotten Tomatoes. Paul Parcellin of Film Threat gave the film an 8 out of 10.

Jordan Mintzer of The Hollywood Reporter gave the film a positive review, calling it "A predictable film noir bouyed [sic] by its cast and atmosphere."
