= Sami Bouajila =

Tunisian-French actor (born 1966)

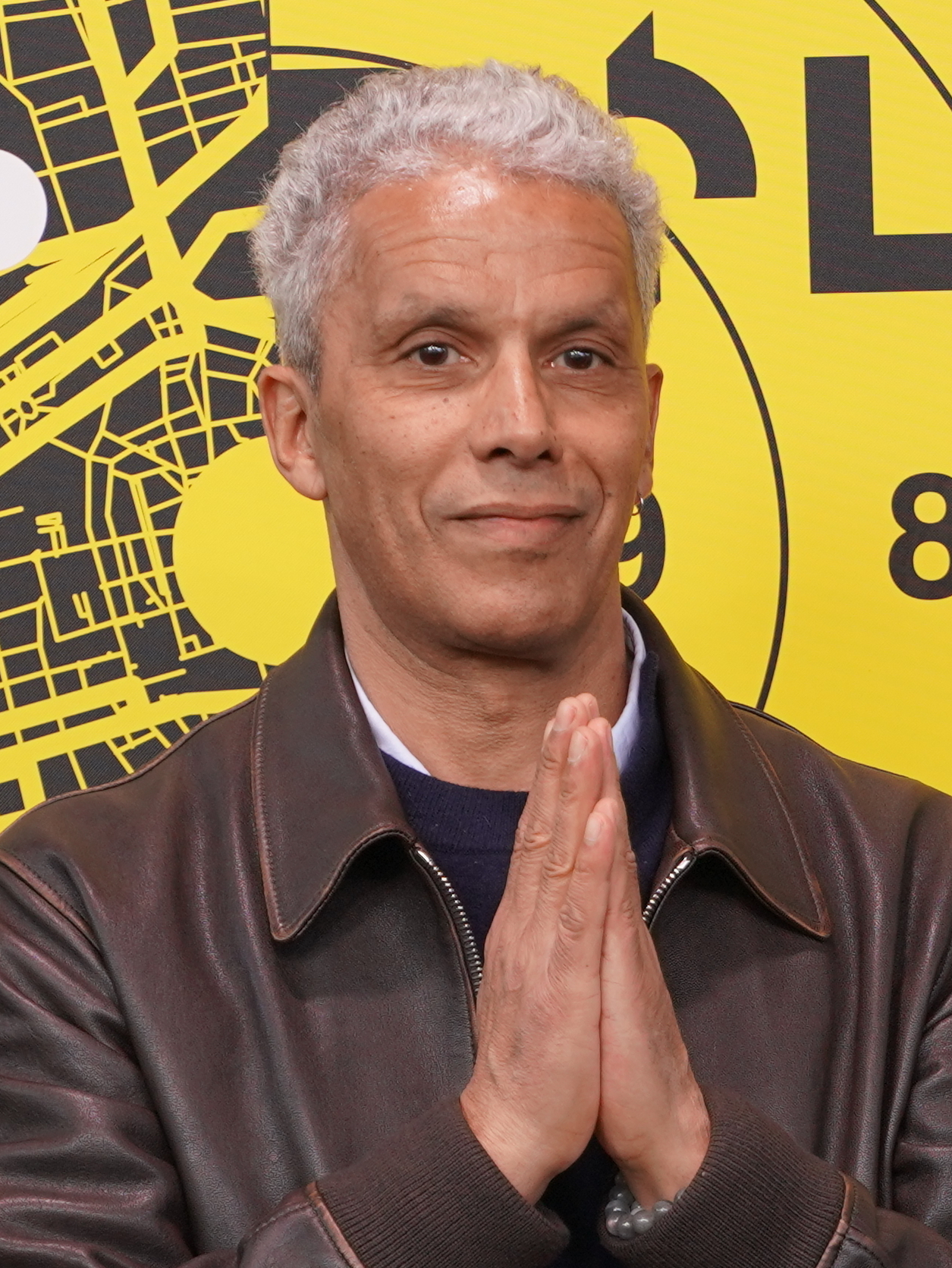
- Bouajila in 2025
- Born: 26 May 1966 (age 60); La Tronche, France
- Education: Conservatoire de Grenoble
- Occupation: Actor
- Website: samibouajila.com

Sami Bouajila (born 26 May 1966) is a Tunisian-French actor who has won two César Awards. Bouajila has worked and acted in two Oscar nominated films (Days of Glory and Outside the Law), both directed by director Rachid Bouchareb.

== Early life ==
Bouajila's father emigrated from Tunisia to France in 1956, and worked as a building painter, a professionally recognized skill requiring specific technical knowledge. His grandfather was an Amazigh and immigrated to Tunisia. Bouajila was born and grew up in Échirolles, a suburb south of Grenoble. He studied theatre.

== Political views ==
In June 2024, Bouajila signed a petition addressed to French President Emmanuel Macron demanding France to officially recognize the State of Palestine.

== Filmography ==
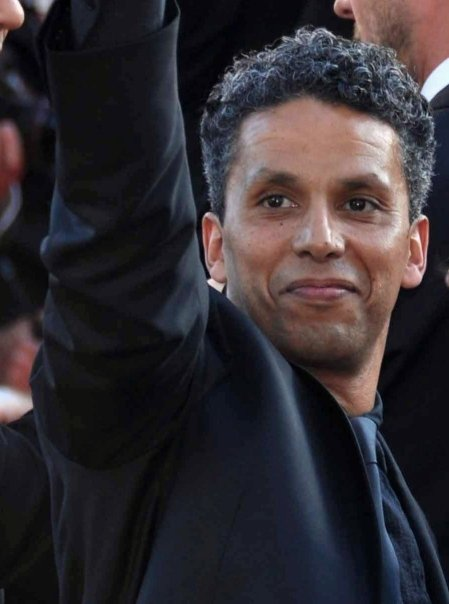
Sami Bouajila at the Cannes Film Festival in 2009.

=== Film ===
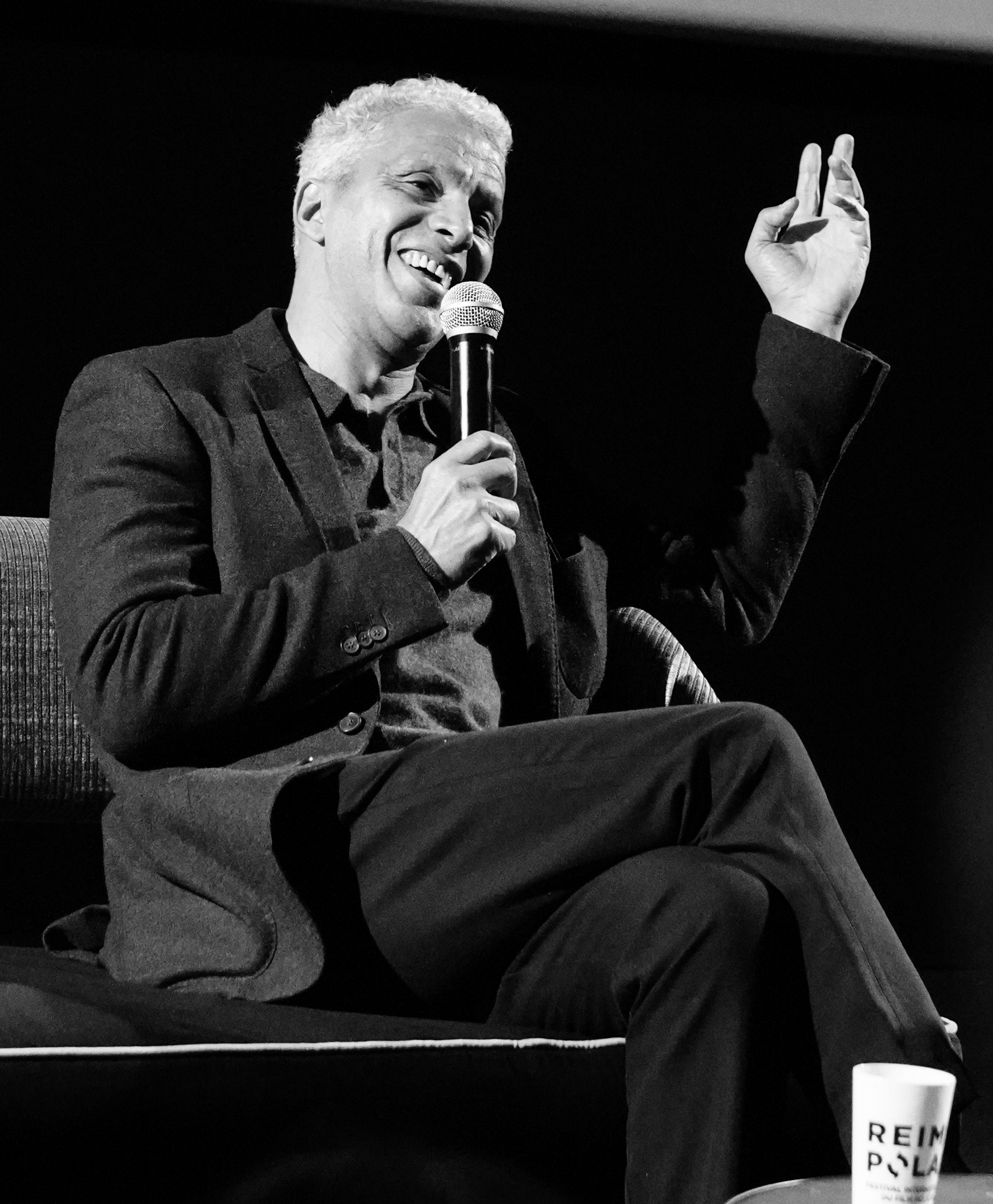
2025

Year	Title	Role	Notes
1991	La Thune	Kamel	
1993	Les Histoires d'amour finissent mal... en général	Slim Touati	
1993	The Hour of the Pig	Mahmoud	
1994	The Silences of the Palace	Lofti	
1995	Bye-Bye	Ismaël	
1996	Anna Oz	Marc	
1997	Artemisia	Tassi's assistant	
1997	Le Déménagement	Jean	
1997	Né quelque part	Driss Bourafia	
1998	The Siege	Samir Nazhde	
1999	Inséparables	Boris	
1999	La Peur du vide		
1999	Our Happy Lives	Ali	
2000	Douce France		
2000	Drôle de Félix	Félix	
2000	Faites comme si je n'étais pas là	Tom	
2000	Poetical Refugee	Jallel	
2000	Nouvelle de la tour L	Dealer	
2001	Change moi ma vie	Fidel	
2001	Replay	Nicolas	
2002	Embrassez qui vous voudrez	Kévin	
2002	The Nest	Selim	
2002	Vivre me tue	Paul Smaïl	
2003	La Légende de Parva	Agni	Voice
2003	Playing 'In the Company of Men'	Léonard	
2003	Pas si grave	Charlie	
2005	Avant l'oubli	Augustin Burger	
2005	Zaïna, cavalière de l'Atlas	Mustapha	
2006	Days of Glory	Abdel Kader	
2006	Le Concile de pierre	Lucas	
2007	24 mesures	Chris	
2007	Le Dernier gang	Casa	
2007	The Witnesses	Mehdi	
2009	The Whistler	Karim Chaouche	
2009	London River	Imam	
2009	Bitter Victory	Yacine Guesmila	
2009	Le Premier Cercle	Saunier	
2010	De vrais mensonges	Jean	
2010	Outside the Law	Abdelkader	
2011	Omar Killed Me	Omar Raddad	
2011	Carré blanc	Philippe	
2014	Patchwork Family	Christian	
2014	Divin Enfant	Jean	
2015	Braqueurs	Yanis Zeri	
2015	A Stormy Summer Night	Nabil	
2015	Good Luck Algeria	Sam	
2016	Pattaya	Krimo's father	
2016	Scribe	Labarthe	
2017	The Blessed	Samir	
2018	Through the Fire	Dr. Almeida	
2018	The Bouncer	Zeroual	
2019	A Son	Fares Ben Youssef	
2019	Paradise Beach	Mehdi	
2020	Earth and Blood	Sami	
2022	Our Ties	Moussa	
2024	The Crow	Kronos	
2025	Desert Warrior	Hani	

=== Television ===
Year	Title	Role	Notes
1998	Une voix en or		Film
2001	Combats de femme – Libre à tout prix	The supervisor	
2011	Signature	Toman	
2014	My Son's Murderer Will Die Tonight	Antoine Harfouche	Film
2016	Don't Leave Me	Medhi	Film
2017–2018	Remember	Belgarde	
2020	Of Earth and Blood	Saïd	Film
2021	Ganglands	Mehdi	
2023	Black Butterflies	Carrel	

== Theatre ==
Year	Title	Director	Notes
1993	Romeo and Juliet	Daniel Benoin	
1995	La Traversée ou le Cri de Peter Pan	Éric de Dadelsen	
1996	Sallinger	Anne-Françoise Benhamou & Denis Loubaton	
2004	Gagarin Way	Bertrand Bossard	
2013	Ring	Catherine Schaub	

== Awards and nominations ==
Year	Award	Category	Nominated work	Result
1995	Thessaloniki Film Festival	Best Actor	Bye-Bye	Won
2000	Cabourg Film Festival	Male Revelation	Drôle de Félix	Won
2006	Cannes Film Festival	Best Actor	Days of Glory	Won
2008	César Award	Best Supporting Actor	The Witnesses	Won
2012	César Award	Best Actor	Omar Killed Me	Nominated
2015	Dubai International Film Festival	Lifetime Achievement Award	—N/a	Won
2019	Venice Film Festival	Horizons Award for Best Actor	A Son	Won
2021	César Award	Best Actor	A Son	Won
