= Driving Madeleine =

Une belle course (Driving Madeleine)
- French: Une belle course
- Directed by: Christian Carion
- Written by: Christian Carion; Cyril Gély
- Produced by: Christian Carion; Laure Irrmann
- Starring: Line Renaud; Dany Boon; Alice Isaaz; Jérémie Laheurte
- Cinematography: Pierre Cottereau
- Edited by: Loïc Lallemand
- Music by: Philippe Rombi
- Production companies: Une Hirondelle Productions; Pathé; TF1 Films Production; Artémis Productions; Shelter Prod
- Distributed by: Pathé (France); Alternative Films (Belgium)
- Release dates: 23 August 2022 (FFA); 21 September 2022 (France)
- Running time: 91 minutes
- Countries: France; Belgium
- Language: French
- Box office: $5.5 million

Une belle course is a 2022 French-Belgian drama film directed by Christian Carion. The film was released in English-speaking countries with the title Driving Madeleine, a reference to the 1989 film Driving Miss Daisy.

== Synopsis ==
Charles Hauffman, a Paris taxi driver with a wife and daughter, is in debts and on the verge of losing his licence. He receives a message to collect a client, the 92-year-old Madeleine Keller, to transport her from Bry-sur-Marne to a retirement home in Courbevoie, with instructions to begin the meter reading immediately, even before his arrival at Bry-sur-Marne. Madeleine requests that Charles drive around Paris to various locations that have been important in her life, instead of driving directly to the retirement home.

From World War II, Madeleine recalls her affair with an American soldier, which resulted in the birth of her out-of-wedlock son Mathieu. Madeleine later married Raymond (Ray) Haguenot, who subsequently exhibits violent abusive behavior towards Madeleine who is legally unable to obtain a divorce on grounds of domestic abuse. Unable to withstand Ray's behaviour any further, she takes violent retaliatory action that maims him and leads to criminal proceedings and extended imprisonment. However, these become a cause célèbre for French women's marital rights. Madeleine serves her prison term and reunites with her grown son, by now a photojournalist who resents his imprisoned absent mother.

Various incidents during the cab ride include disruption of traffic so that Madeleine can use the toilet at a restaurant, and a traffic violation by Charles from which Madeleine helps to extricate him so that he does not lose his business licence. Madeleine further recalls other events in her life that relate to the May 68 demonstrations and to the Vietnam War. The two visit landmarks such as a memorial to Parisians deported during World War II, and also share dinner, before they eventually arrive at the retirement home. Moved and engrossed by Madeleine's story, Charles neglects to collect his fare. Soon afterwards, Madeleine's barrister brings Charles a final communication from Madeleine.

== Cast ==
- Line Renaud as Madeleine Keller
- Dany Boon as Charles Hauffman
- Alice Isaaz as Young Madeleine Keller
- Jérémie Laheurte as Ray Haguenot
- Gwendoline Hamon as Denise
- Julie Delarme as Karine
- Thomas Alden as Mathieu Keller
- Hadriel Roure as Young Mathieu Keller
- Christophe Rossignon as president of the tribunal

== Production ==
The film entered production in mid-2021, including location work in Saint-Maur-des-Fossés in Val-de-Marne and La Plaine Saint-Denis. Filming was completed in July 2021. At the suggestion of cinematographer Pierre Cottereau, immersive 4K LCD screens were used to film footage of Paris separately from the principal actors. Subsequently, the production team filmed the driving scenes with the principal actors in a stationary car, with 4-meter by 3-meter ultra-HD panels surrounding them and with the separately filmed location footage projected on to the panels. Whilst a limited amount of footage made directly in Paris with the principal actors took place, the use of the immersive 4K LCD technology reduced the need for film footage made directly on location.

== Release ==
The film premiered on 23 August 2022 at the Angoulême Francophone Film Festival. It was also screened as a special presentation at the 2022 Toronto International Film Festival, before going into commercial release on 21 September. The film was released theatrically in the United States on 12 January 2024 by Cohen Media Group.

== Reception ==
On the review aggregator website Rotten Tomatoes, 94% of 52 critics' reviews are positive, with an average rating of 7.3/10. The website's consensus reads: "Fueled by the sparkling chemistry between Line Renaud and Dany Boon, Driving Madeleine proves a sweetly sentimental drama that deftly tugs the heartstrings." Metacritic, which uses a weighted average, assigned the film a score of 65 out of 100, based on 7 critics, indicating "generally favorable" reviews.

Renaud won the Tiantan Award for Best Actress at the 2023 Beijing International Film Festival, where the film was one of the 15 shortlisted films competing for the festival's 10 Tiantan Awards. Driving Madeleine was nominated for the Japan Academy Film Prize for Outstanding Foreign Language Film at the 47th Japan Academy Film Prize ceremony.

== Remake ==
Driving Madeleine was remade in Japan by Shochiku as Tokyo Taxi, directed by Yoji Yamada and starring Chieko Baisho and Takuya Kimura, which was released on 29 October 2025.
