= Japan Academy Film Prize for Outstanding Foreign Language Film =

Japanese film award

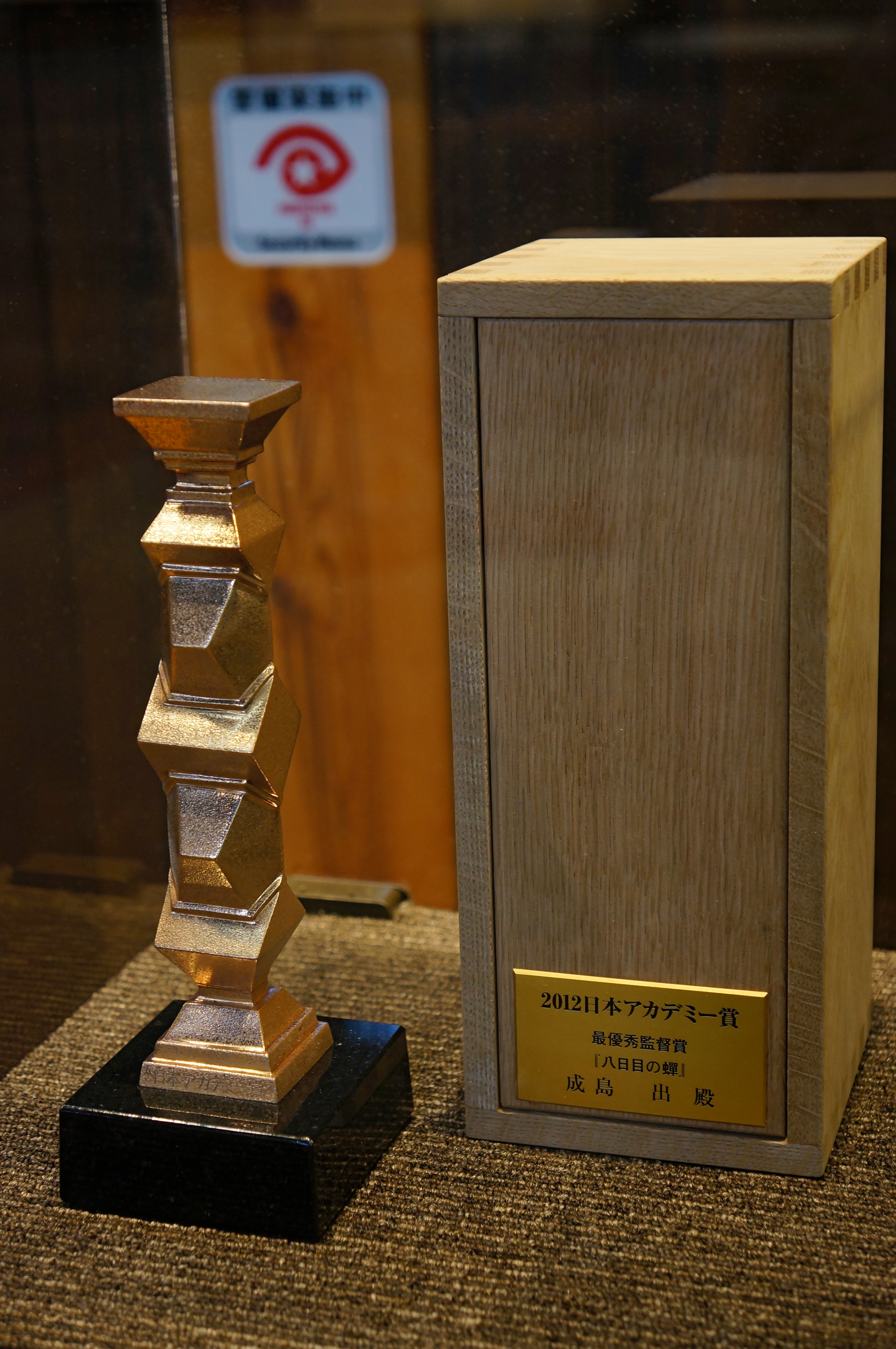
Trophy of the Japan Academy Prize.

Every year since its inception, the Japanese Academy has awarded the Japan Academy Film Prize for Outstanding Foreign Language Film (Japanese: 日本アカデミー賞外国作品賞, romanized: Nihon akademī-shō gaikoku sakuhin-shō, lit. 'Japan Academy Award for Best Foreign Production'). The year that any given film is nominated is not based on the film's domestic release date but rather on the date it is released in Japan. As delays of over four months are not uncommon, many films are nominated in Japan the year following their release to the Japanese market (e.g., Million Dollar Baby won the American Academy Award for Best Picture for films made in 2004, but the Japanese award, based on its local release date, is for 2005). In fact, not one of the five films nominated for the 2007 Academy Award for Best Picture had been released in Japan by February 15, 2008, the date of the Japan Academy Prize Ceremony.

Although the 2007 recipient of this award, Letters from Iwo Jima, a film almost entirely in Japanese, would not seem to meet the qualification of a "Foreign Language Film", the actual Japanese title of the award, makes no mention of language. It would be more accurately translated as "Best Foreign Production".

== Winners and nominees ==
- 2026 – Conclave
  - Twilight of the Warriors: Walled In
  - Mission: Impossible – The Final Reckoning
  - One Battle After Another
  - F1
- 2025 – Oppenheimer
  - Poor Things
  - The Zone of Interest
  - Civil War
  - Laapataa Ladies
- 2024 – Mission: Impossible – Dead Reckoning Part One
  - Killers of the Flower Moon
  - Barbie
  - Driving Madeleine
  - Tár
- 2023 – Top Gun: Maverick
  - RRR
  - Avatar: The Way of Water
  - CODA
  - Spider-Man: No Way Home
- 2022 – No Time to Die
  - Dune
  - Minari
  - Nomadland
  - Tailor
- 2021 – Parasite
  - Star Wars: The Rise of Skywalker
  - Ford v Ferrari
  - 1917
  - Tenet
- 2020 – Joker
  - Yesterday
  - Green Book
  - The Mule
  - Once Upon a Time in Hollywood
- 2019 – Bohemian Rhapsody
  - The Greatest Showman
  - The Shape of Water
  - Three Billboards Outside Ebbing, Missouri
  - Mission: Impossible – Fallout
- 2018 – La La Land
  - Dunkirk
  - Hidden Figures
  - Beauty and the Beast
  - Miss Sloane
- 2017 – Sully
  - The Martian
  - Zootopia
  - Star Wars: The Force Awakens
  - The Revenant
- 2016 – American Sniper
  - Kingsman: The Secret Service
  - Mad Max: Fury Road
  - Spectre
  - Whiplash
- 2015 – Frozen
  - Interstellar
  - Jersey Boys
  - Fury
  - Godzilla
- 2014 – Les Misérables
  - 3 Idiots
  - Captain Phillips
  - Django Unchained
  - Gravity
- 2013 – The Intouchables
  - Argo
  - The Dark Knight Rises
  - The Girl with the Dragon Tattoo
  - Skyfall
- 2012 – The King's Speech
  - Rise of the Planet of the Apes
  - Moneyball
  - The Social Network
  - Black Swan
- 2011 – Avatar
  - Inception
  - Toy Story 3
  - Invictus
  - The Hurt Locker
- 2010 – Gran Torino
  - Slumdog Millionaire
  - Changeling
  - The Wrestler
  - Red Cliff Part II
- 2009 – The Dark Knight
  - The Bucket List
  - No Country for Old Men
  - Lust, Caution
  - Red Cliff Part I
- 2008 – Letters from Iwo Jima
  - Dreamgirls
  - Babel
  - Hairspray
  - The Bourne Ultimatum
- 2007 – Flags of Our Fathers
  - Crash
  - Hotel Rwanda
  - Pirates of the Caribbean: Dead Man's Chest
  - The Da Vinci Code
- 2006 – Million Dollar Baby
  - Cinderella Man
  - Charlie and the Chocolate Factory
  - The Phantom of the Opera
  - Star Wars: Episode III – Revenge of the Sith
- 2005 – The Last Samurai
  - The Lord of the Rings: The Return of the King
  - Mystic River
  - Seabiscuit
  - Troy
- 2004 – The Pianist
  - Chicago
  - The Hours
  - The Lord of the Rings: The Two Towers
  - Yeopgijeogin geunyeo
- 2003 – Monster's Ball
  - Gangs of New York
  - Harry Potter and the Chamber of Secrets
  - I Am Sam
  - The Lord of the Rings: The Fellowship of the Ring
- 2002 – Billy Elliot
  - Artificial Intelligence: AI
  - Chocolat
  - Harry Potter and the Philosopher's Stone
  - Postmen in the Mountains
- 2001 – Dancer in the Dark
  - American Beauty
  - Gladiator
  - The Green Mile
  - Swiri
- 2000 – The Sixth Sense
  - Elizabeth
  - The Matrix
  - Shakespeare in Love
  - La Vita è bella
- 1999 – L.A. Confidential
  - Armageddon
  - As Good as It Gets
  - Good Will Hunting
  - Saving Private Ryan
- 1998 – Titanic
  - The English Patient
  - Shine
  - Air Force One
  - Seven Years in Tibet
- 1997 – Il Postino
  - Independence Day
  - Mission: Impossible
  - Se7en
  - 12 Monkeys
- 1996 – The Shawshank Redemption
  - Apollo 13
  - The Bridges of Madison County
  - Forrest Gump
  - Léon
- 1995 – Schindler's List
  - The Piano
  - Pulp Fiction
  - Speed
  - True Lies
- 1994 – Jurassic Park
  - Cliffhanger
  - The Fugitive
  - Heaven & Earth
  - Unforgiven
- 1993 – JFK
  - The Lover
  - Basic Instinct
  - The Bodyguard
  - A League of Their Own
- 1992 – Dances with Wolves
  - Awakenings
  - La Femme Nikita
  - The Silence of the Lambs
  - Terminator 2: Judgment Day
- 1991 – Field of Dreams
  - Die Hard 2
  - Ghost
  - Cinema Paradiso
  - Total Recall
- 1990 – Die Hard
  - Black Rain
  - Indiana Jones and the Last Crusade
  - Major League
  - Rain Man
- 1989 – The Last Emperor
  - Fatal Attraction
  - Full Metal Jacket
  - Moonstruck
  - Wall Street
- 1988 – Platoon
  - Hannah and Her Sisters
  - Stand By Me
  - Top Gun
  - The Untouchables
- 1987 – Back to the Future
  - Aliens
  - A Chorus Line
  - The Color Purple
  - Out of Africa
- 1986 – Amadeus
  - The Cotton Club
  - The Killing Fields
  - A Passage to India
  - Witness
- 1985 – Once Upon a Time in America
  - Indiana Jones and the Temple of Doom
  - The Natural
  - The Right Stuff
  - Terms of Endearment
- 1984 – An Officer and a Gentleman
  - The Woman Next Door
  - Flashdance
  - Gandhi
  - Sophie's Choice
- 1983 – E.T. the Extra-Terrestrial
  - Das Boot
  - Chariots of Fire
  - On Golden Pond
  - Rocky III
- 1982 – Die Blechtrommel
  - Being There
  - The Elephant Man
  - Ordinary People
  - Les Uns et les Autres
- 1981 – Kramer vs. Kramer
  - All That Jazz
  - Apocalypse Now
  - Manhattan
  - Tess
- 1980 – The Deer Hunter
  - The Tree of Wooden Clogs
  - Big Wednesday
  - The Champ
  - The Travelling Players
- 1979 – Conversation Piece
  - Close Encounters of the Third Kind
  - The Goodbye Girl
  - Star Wars
  - The Turning Point
- 1978 – Rocky
  - The Fire Within
  - Network
  - Slap Shot
  - Voyage of the Damned
