= Karmapolice =

2023 film by Julien Paolini

- Theatrical release poster
- Directed by: Julien Paolini
- Written by: Manolis Mavropoulos; Julien Paolini; Syrus Shahidi
- Produced by: Marie Etchegoyen; Syrus Shahidi; Yann Girard; Julien Paolini
- Starring: Syrus Shahidi; Alexis Manenti; Karidja Touré; Foëd Amara; Steve Tientcheu; Hortense Ardalan; Sabrina Ouazani
- Cinematography: Hadrien Vedel
- Edited by: Gwen Ghelid; Clémence Samson
- Music by: datA; Pasquale Filastò
- Production companies: La Réserve; Cousines et Dépendances; Charly's Films; Dinosaures; Sugar Mama Productions; S'Imagine Films
- Distributed by: DHR Distribution / À Vif Cinémas
- Release dates: 21 October 2023 (Festival Polar de Cognac); 17 July 2024 (France)
- Running time: 80 minutes
- Country: France
- Language: French

Karmapolice is a 2023 French neo-noir crime thriller film directed by Julien Paolini. His second feature film, Karmapolice was written by Paolini in collaboration with Manolis Mavropoulos and Syrus Shahidi. It stars Shahidi as a troubled cop who investigates his mysterious neighbour. Alexis Manenti and Karidja Touré appear in supporting roles. It premiered on 21 October 2023 at the Festival Polar de Cognac, before being theatrically released in France on 17 July 2024.

== Plot ==
Angelo is an idealistic policeman consumed by guilt after he accidentally caused the death of a woman he was trying to help. He is put on sick leave and moves with his girlfriend to the working-class Château Rouge neighbourhood of Paris. There, he befriends a knowledgeable local named Poulet. He becomes concerned about a woman who lives across the hall named Elena, a drug addict who is allegedly under the influence of the neighbourhood's slumlord and crack dealer Anselme. Angelo involves himself in Poulet's activities and starts his own undercover investigation.

== Cast ==
- Syrus Shahidi as Angelo
- Alexis Manenti as Poulet
- Karidja Touré as Pauline
- Foëd Amara as Kemar
- Steve Tientcheu as Anselme
- Hortense Ardalan as Elena
- Sabrina Ouazani as Maman
- Thomas Blumenthal as le voleur
- Yaniss Lespert as un collègue
- Yaya Bathily as un collègue
- Zacharie Chasseriaud as l'agent immobilier
- Lauréna Thellier as la victime

== Production ==
Paolini drew inspiration from French comics, including those by Charles Burns, Lewis Trondheim, Joann Sfar and Emmanuel Larcenet.

== Release ==
Karmapolice was presented in competition at the Festival Polar de Cognac, where it had its world premiere on 21 October 2023 and earned Paolini his second Grand Prix. The film was theatrically released in France on 17 July 2024, distributed by DHR.

== Reception ==
On AlloCiné, the film received an average rating of 3.0 out of 5 stars, based on 12 reviews from French critics. LeMagduCiné saw it as "the legacy of a certain New York underground cinema, from early Scorsese to the Safdie brothers, via Lynch's Blue Velvet". Emmanuel Le Gagne of Culturopoing assessed it as a "dreamlike thriller coupled with a poetic fable" and compared it to the works of Samuel Fuller, Abel Ferrara, Julien Duvivier and Marcel Carné. Cineuropa wrote that Paolini confirmed his "singularity" as a director. Xavier Leherpeur of Le Nouvel Obs gave the film a positive review, writing, "If the storyline of this karmic thriller sometimes gets a little lost in its maze [...] the mise en scène sets things back on track. Captivating, opaque and surreal, it immerses the spectator in a mental and melancholic labyrinth in which it is a beautiful experience to get lost." Catherine Balle of Le Parisien praised the "fascinating" immersion into Château Rouge's criminal underworld and wrote that the film turned out to be "very well-crafted and very well-acted". Télérama praised the "rigorous" performances by Syrus Shahidi and Alexis Manenti, a pairing which they compared to Al Pacino and Robert De Niro. In a mixed review, Libération's Camille Nevers wrote that the film "has charm and ideas but fails to create the disturbing atmosphere it aspires to".
