= Line Renaud =

French singer, actress and AIDS activist (born 1928)

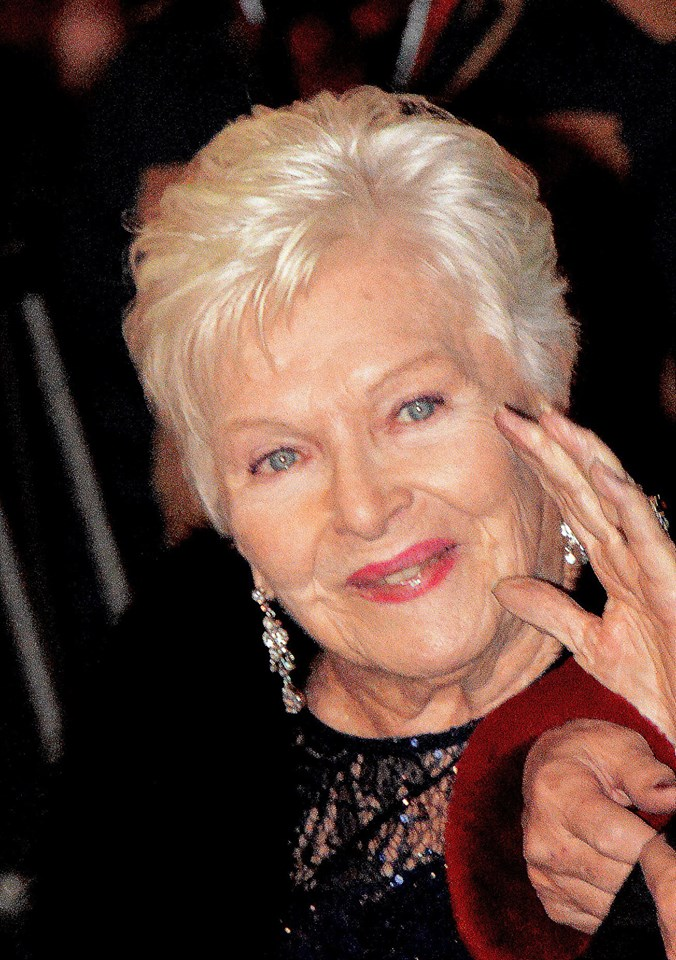
- Renaud in 2018
- Born: Jacqueline Enté; 2 July 1928 (age 97); Nieppe, France
- Occupations: Singer, actress, AIDS activist
- Years active: 1945–present
- Spouse: Loulou Gasté (m. 1950; died 1995)

Line Renaud (born Jacqueline Ente on 2 July 1928) is a French singer, actress and AIDS activist.

In her 80 year career, she has appeared in 86 films and TV films, released 25 albums and 114 singles. She has also appeared in 12 plays and written or co-written approximately 20 books. In 2022, she played the titular character in the film Driving Madeleine.

== Early life ==
Line Renaud was born in Pont-de-Nieppe on 2 July 1928. Her mother Simone was a shorthand typist; her father was a truck driver during the week but he played the trumpet, on weekends, in a local brass band. Line showed the first signs of her talent in primary school, when at the age of seven she won an amateur competition.

During the Second World War, Jacqueline's father was mobilised, spending five years away from the family. During this time, Jacqueline was brought up by her mother, grandmother and great-grandmother. Her grandmother had a café in Armentières, where Jacqueline used to sing for passing soldiers.

== Career ==
She auditioned at Conservatoire de Lille, singing songs written by Louis "Loulou" Gasté "Sainte-Madeleine" and "Mon âme au diable", a well-known French composer. At the end of the audition, she was approached by the director of Radio Lille who was looking for a singer. She took the pseudonym of Jacqueline Ray and joined the station singing a repertoire based on the songs by Loulou Gasté.

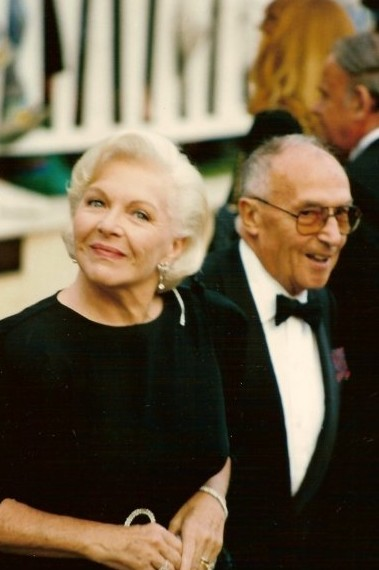
Line Renaud at the 1990 Cannes Film Festival with husband Loulou Gasté

Line Renaud made her national debut on Radio Luxembourg, singing on a Sunday morning program. After signing a contract with Pathe Marconi, she recorded "Ma Cabane au Canada", written by Loulou Gasté, which won le Grand Prix du Disque. She also sang with Yves Montand in the Théâtre de l'Etoile. She toured Europe and Africa extensively, came back to Paris to star at the ABC, and recorded numerous adaptations of American songs such as "Ma petite folie", "Étoile des neiges" and "Le Chien dans la vitrine".

In 1954, while performing at Moulin Rouge, she met Bob Hope and subsequently appeared in five episodes of The Bob Hope Show in the US. During this trip, she also sang in the Waldorf Astoria (New York) and the Cocoanut Grove (Los Angeles), appeared on Johnny Carson, Dinah Shore and Ed Sullivan shows and recorded with Dean Martin the songs "Relax-Ay-Voo" and "Two Sleepy People".

In 1959, she started a four-year run of Plaisir de Paris for Henri Varna and then went on to perform in a Las Vegas show at Dunes from 1963 to 1965. In 1966 she returned to Paris and the Casino de Paris starring in a new show, Desir de Paris. In 1968, she returned to Las Vegas for a number of performances. In France, in 1973 she created an American show which she toured for two years around the country. She then helped Casino de Paris, threatened by closing, by putting on a show called ‘Paris – Line’ with Loulou Gasté, which ran for four years.

In the 1980s, she starred in a TV show Telle est Line for Antenne 2 and recorded songs in English and French. At Casino de Paris, she put on a one-off show which retraced her forty-year career. Also, in 1981, she served as an unofficial on-air "guide" for Merv Griffin when he taped "The Merv Griffin Show" in Paris, and in 1982 she was a guest on Perry Como's Christmas special in Paris. In 1989, she toured around Japan as part of a festival which marked the bicentennial of the French Revolution.

In 2022, aged 94, she starred as Madeleine in the film Driving Madeleine with Dany Boon.

== AIDS activism ==
In 1985, she created l'Association des Artistes Contre le Sida (Association of Artists Against AIDS) and organised televised art events which enabled her to raise funds for helping AIDS scientific research in France.

In 2009, as vice-president of Sidaction, she condemned the statements of Pope Benedict XVI, who claimed condoms promoted behavior which causes AIDS.

== Personal life ==
In 1945, she moved to Paris and got her first gig in Folies Belleville, where she was introduced to Gasté. She was 16, and Gasté was 37. He became her mentor, changing her image and her name. In 1950, she married Louis 'Loulou' Gasté; he died in 1995.

In March 2019, Renaud was hospitalised due to a fall in her garden.

== Recognition ==
In 2000, a Golden Palm Star on the Palm Springs, Walk of Stars was dedicated to her.

In 2022, Renaud was awarded the rank of Grand Cross of the Legion d'Honneur at a ceremony presided over by President Emmanuel Macron.

== Selected filmography ==
- 1952 – Love in the Vineyard (Robert Vernay)
- 1952 – Paris Still Sings (Pierre Montazel; music by Loulou Gasté)
- 1953 – La route du bonheur (Maurice Labro)
- 1953 – Double or Quits (Robert Vernay)
- 1953 – Boum sur Paris (Maurice de Canonge)
- 1955 – Madelon (she won Prix du Prestige de la France)
- 1957 – Mademoiselle and Her Gang (Jean Boyer; music written by Loulou Gasté)
- 1959 – The Indestructible and Mademoiselle et son flirt (Jean Boyer)
- 1987 – Silver Spoons, Jacqueline
- 1988 – Marriage of Figaro (Roger Coggio)
- 1990 – Ripoux contre Ripoux (Claude Zidi)
- 1994 – J’ai pas sommeil (Claire Denis)
- 1995 – Sixieme classique (Bernard Stora)
- 1995 – Ma femme me quitte (Didier Kaminka)
- 1998 – Louise et les marchés (Marc Rivière)
- 1999 – Belle maman (Gabriel Aghion)
- 2001 – Chaos (Coline Serreau)
- 2003 – 18 Years Later (Coline Serreau)
- 2003 - Suzie Berton (Bernard Stora)
- 2004 – Le Miroir de l'eau (Edwin Baily)
- 2004 – Menteur ! Menteuse ! (Henry Helman)
- 2005 – Le Courage d'aimer (Claude Lelouch)
- 2005 – Les Sœurs Robin
- 2005 – Les Rois maudits (Josée Dayan)
- 2006 – La Maison du Bonheur (Dany Boon)
- 2008 – Bienvenue chez les Ch'tis (Dany Boon)
- 2008 – Le Silence de l'Epervier (Dominique Ladoge)
- 2010 – Isabelle disparue (Bernard Stora)
- 2011 – La croisière (Pascale Pouzadoux)
- 2015 – Call My Agent! (Antoine Garceau)
- 2019 – Huguette (Antoine Garceau)
- 2022 – Driving Madeleine (Une belle course)

== Theatre ==
- 1981 – Folle Amanda (Pierre Barillet and Jean-Pierre Gredy)
- 1986 – The Incomparable Loulou (Charles Nelson-Reilly) English version of Folle Amanda, played in the US
- 1991 – Pleins Feux (Didier Kaminka after Mary Orr)
- 1995 – La visite de la vieille dame (Friedrich Dürrenmatt)
- 2002 – Poste restante (Noël Coward)
- 2007 – Fugueuses (Pierre Palmade, Christophe Duthuron)
- 2012 – Harold et Maude (by Colin Higgins, French version Jean-Claude Carrière) as Maude, opposite Thomas Solivéres as Harold at the Théâtre Antoine-Simone Berriau
