= Karidja Touré =

French actress (born 1994)

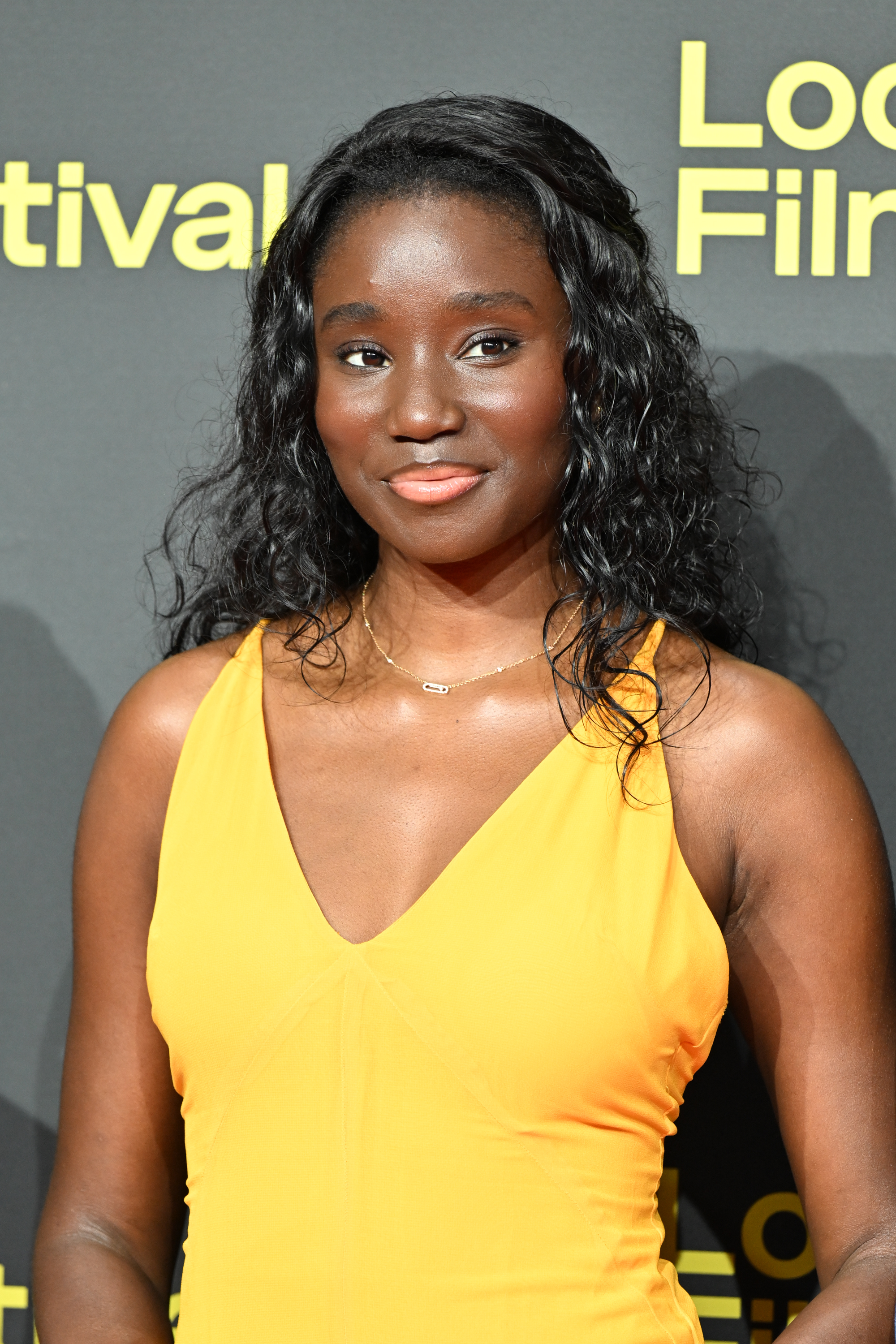
- At the Locarno Film Festival for 'Don't Let The Sun', 10 August 2025
- Born: 14 February 1994 (age 32); Bondy, Ile-de-France, France
- Occupation: Actress
- Years active: 2014–present

Karidja Touré (born 14 February 1994) is a French actress best known for starring in the film Girlhood.

== Life and career ==
Karidja Touré was born in the Paris suburb of Bondy, the daughter of an estate agent and a childcare worker. Both of Touré's parents are from the Ivory Coast. She grew up in the 15th arrondissement of Paris and is a practicing Muslim.

Touré was in her first year of study for a higher diploma when she was noticed at an amusement park by the casting director for Céline Sciamma's film Girlhood. For her work in the film she was nominated for a César Award for Most Promising Actress.

In June 2015, she appeared in the music video for Louane Emera's single "Jeune (j'ai envie)".

== Filmography ==
Year	Title	Role	Director	Notes
2014	Girlhood	Marieme / Vic	Céline Sciamma	Nominated - César Award for Most Promising Actress; Nominated - Lumière Award for Best Female Revelation; Nominated - Black Reel Award for Outstanding Actress; Nominated - Chlotrudis Award for Best Actress
2017	The Midwife	Madame Naja	Martin Provost	
2017	Back to Burgundy	Lina	Cédric Klapisch	
2017	La colle	Leila	Alexandre Castagnetti	
2017	Skokan		Petr Vaclav	
2017	The Adventures of Selika	Selika	Sybil H. Mair	Short
2018	Tamara Vol. 2	Naima	Alexandre Castagnetti	
2018	Au bout des doigts	Anna	Ludovic Bernard	Post-Production
2018	L'échappée	Morgane	Mathias Pardo	Post-Production
2019	Versus	Camille	François Valla	
2020	Tout nous sourit	Yseult	Mélissa Drigeard	
2022	Ima	Ima	Nils Tavernier	
2023	Karmapolice	Pauline	Julien Paolini	
2025	Don't Let the Sun	Ana	Jacqueline Zünd	Premiered at the 78th Locarno Film Festival
