= The 8th Cumming =

Studio album by Cumgirl8
- Released: October 4, 2024
- Genres: Post-punk; pop rock; indie rock; new wave; synth-pop
- Length: 35:41
- Label: 4AD

Singles from The 8th Cumming
- 1. "Karma Police" Released: August 8, 2024; 2. "Ahhh!hhhh! (I Don't Wanna Go)" Released: September 12, 2024

The 8th Cumming (stylized in all lowercase) is the second studio album by American post-punk band and multi-media collective Cumgirl8. It was released on October 4, 2024, through 4AD. The album experiments with the genres of post-punk, new wave and synth-pop, and explores themes of sexual liberation, despair and desperation.

The 8th Cumming was promoted with a tour across North America and Europe, two standalone singles, "Glasshour" and "Quite Like Love", along with the singles "Karma Police" and "Ahhh!hhhh! (I Don't Wanna Go)". It received generally favorable reviews upon release, with critics praising the unpredictability of the album and complimenting its experimentation and roots in post-punk.

== Background ==
In 2023, Cumgirl8 signed with the British record label 4AD; that same year, they released the debut EP, Phantasea Pharm. DIY's Otis Robinson described the EP as "a parody of femme objectification". In an interview with Matt Mitchell of Paste before the release of The 8th Cumming, guitarist Veronika Vilim said in relation to joining the label, "There's this message that we're trying to put out to people, and the problem with it—with being objectified—is that we’re being told that we can't, or that we're not good enough, or whatever fuels the fire. It's rewarding to see people start to understand what we're doing, because we are doing something." Drummer Chase Lombardo added, "if we're pissing people off, it's such a compliment." In 2024, Cumgirl8 released the standalone singles "Glasshour" and "Quite Like Love".

== Release ==
Cumgirl8 announced the album on August 8, 2024, with the release of the lead single "Karma Police". New Noise Magazine's Stefanie Sanchez described the track as "If Siouxsie and the Banshees, Berlin, Bjork, and Nine Inch Nails had a baby, this would be it." On September 12, 2024, they released the single "Ahhh!hhhh! (I Don't Wanna Go)".

The 8th Cumming was released on October 4, 2024. The album was supported with a tour across North America and Europe. The tour covered the United States and Canada, along with France, Italy, Switzerland, Germany, the Netherlands, Denmark, Belgium, and the United Kingdom.

== Reception ==
Professional ratings
Aggregate scores
Source	Rating
Metacritic	72/100
Review scores
Source	Rating
DIY	3.5/5 stars
Far Out	4/5 stars
The Line of Best Fit	7/10
The Needle Drop	7/10 (Note: Fantano specifically gave the album "a strong 6 to a light 7".)
NME	4/5 stars
Paste	6/10

The 8th Cumming received generally favorable reviews on release. On the review aggregating website Metacritic, the album received a normalized rating of 72 out of 100 based on 4 critical reviews. Writing for NME, May Robbins called it "a refreshingly feminist and futuristic take on post-punk". DIY's Lisa Wright noted the album's roots in "the shadier, the more electronic underbelly of the '80s", comparing it to the works of Siouxsie Sioux, The Cure and Kraftwerk and describing it as "the painful sound of the real female experience". Anthony Fantano praised the energy of the album and stated that the band was worth following in the future. The Line of Best Fit's Matt Young gave the album strong praise, stating that Cumgirl8 stood out as "a refreshing force of transgressive experimentation" and further appreciating its exploration of sexual liberation and its varied range of experimentation. Elle Palmer of Far Out expressed that The 8th Cumming felt like an album that only Cumgirl8 could have made, noting its unpredictability and themes of desperation and despair in relation to the world and dating.

In a more neutral review, Paste writer Cat Woods gave the album a 6/10, complimenting the album but calling "Mercy" forgettable and noting that "the 1980s videogame sonics can be tiresome about four tracks in". Contrastingly, Matt Mitchell complimented the album's indulgence into sexuality and described the album as "an intergalactic, unknowable stamp of utopian, warped chaos".

== Track listing ==
No.	Title	Length
1.	"Karma Police"	3:01
2.	"Ahhh!hhhh! (I Don't Wanna Go)"	3:09
3.	"Mercy"	3:34
4.	"Hysteria!"	3:10
5.	"UTI"	3:54
6.	"Simulation"	3:44
7.	"Girls Don't Try"	3:28
8.	"iBerry"	3:42
9.	"NY Winter"	4:03
10.	"Something New"	3:51
Total length:		35:41

== Personnel ==
Credits adapted from Tidal.

=== Cumgirl8 ===
- Avishag Rodrigues – vocals, guitar, bass guitar, synthesizer, producer, composer, lyricist
- Chase Lombardo – drums, bass guitar, synthesizer, programmer, producer, composer, lyricist
- Lida Fox – bass guitar, synthesizer, composer, lyricist
- Veronika Vilim – vocals, guitar, synthesizer, composer, lyricist

=== Additional musicians ===
- Mark Indelicato – studio musician
- Paul Millar – studio musician, synthesizer, mixing
- Paul Gold – mastering
