= One Wild Moment =

- Theatrical release poster
- Directed by: Jean-François Richet
- Screenplay by: Lisa Azuelos; Jean-François Richet
- Based on: Un moment d'égarement by Claude Berri
- Produced by: Sébastien Delloye; Thomas Langmann
- Starring: Vincent Cassel; François Cluzet; Alice Isaaz; Lola Le Lann
- Cinematography: Robert Gantz; Pascal Marti
- Edited by: Hervé Schneid
- Music by: Philippe Rombi
- Production companies: Entre Chien et Loup; La Petite Reine
- Distributed by: Mars Distribution
- Release dates: 11 June 2015 (Cabourg); 24 June 2015 (France)
- Running time: 105 minutes
- Country: France
- Language: French
- Budget: €12 million
- Box office: $6 million

One Wild Moment (French title: Un moment d'égarement) is a 2015 French comedy-drama film directed by Jean-François Richet. It is a remake of the 1977 film Un moment d'égarement, directed by Claude Berri. It stars Vincent Cassel, François Cluzet, Alice Isaaz and Lola Le Lann on film debut.

The film was produced by Berri's son, Thomas Langmann, and Sébastien Delloye.

== Plot ==
Antoine, a hot-tempered Corsican with old-fashioned ideas about women, returns to the isolated old family home on the island for a summer holiday with his 17-year-old daughter Louna but without his wife. Instead, he takes his old friend Laurent, who is divorced, with his 18-year-old daughter Marie, who is good friends with Louna.

While the two men are looking forward to nice relaxing days in the country, the two girls want all-night fun in discos. Louna, instead of passing encounters with boys of her age, dreams of a grand romance with a real man and sets her sights on Laurent. He succumbs after both have been drinking and she goes for a midnight swim naked. (Antoine, it is revealed later, was equally busy with an attractive lady from a pancake stall).

Realizing his guilt towards Louna, to her parents, and to his infuriated daughter, Laurent tries to stop the relationship going any further, but Louna's ardour only increases. When she is finally kicked out of his bedroom, she tells her father she has been seeing an older man but refuses to name him. Antoine goes berserk and, loading a shotgun, insists that Laurent help him find the rat who has ruined his daughter. After Antoine has beaten up a gay DJ, Laurent realizes he will have to confess.

This he does while the two men are alone in the woods hunting wild boar. The two girls, who have made up when Louna stopped sleeping with Laurent, return at dawn from a disco to find their fathers battered and bruised but relaxed.

== Cast ==
- Vincent Cassel as Laurent
- François Cluzet as Antoine
- Alice Isaaz as Marie
- Lola Le Lann as Louna
- Annelise Hesme as Sylvie
- Noémie Merlant as Linda
- Philippe Nahon as Antoine's Neighbor

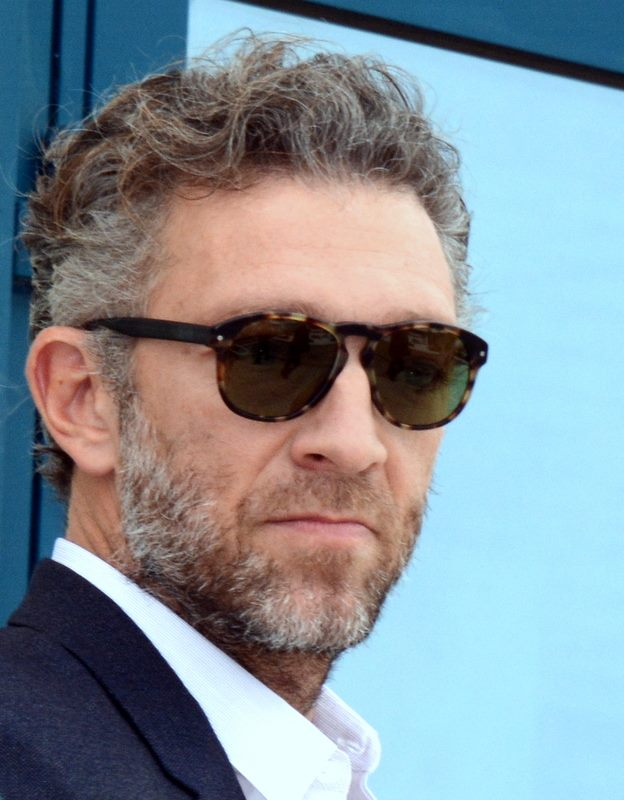
Vincent Cassel at the Cannes Film Festival in 2015

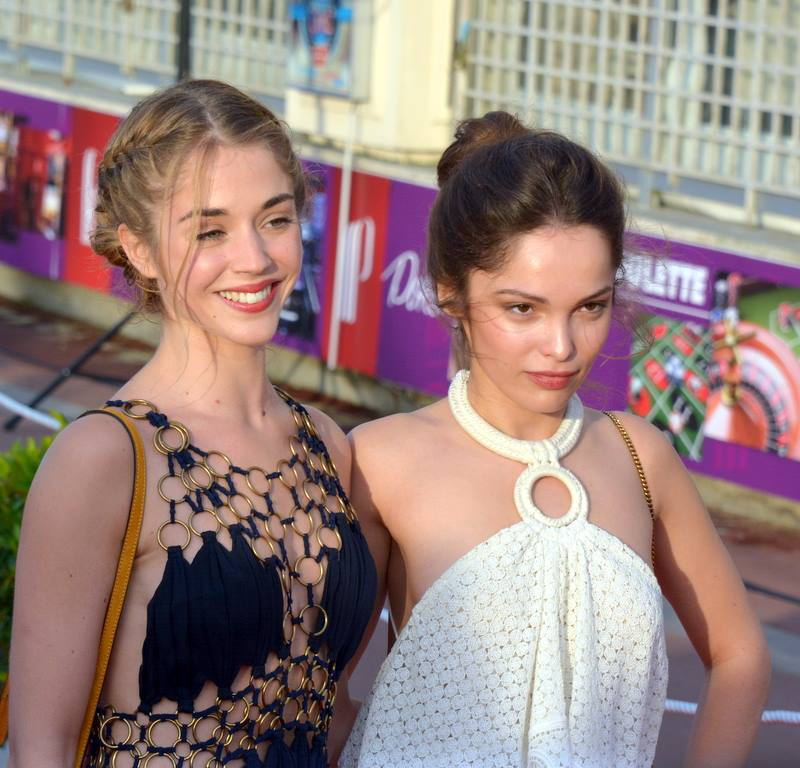
Alice Isaaz and Lola Le Lann at the Cabourg Film Festival in 2015

== See also ==
- Blame It on Rio - The American remake of Un moment d'égarement (1977)
