= The Bouncer (film) =

- Theatrical release poster
- Directed by: Julien Leclercq
- Written by: Jérémie Guez
- Produced by: Julien Madon; Aimée Buidine; Julien Leclercq; Jérémie Guez
- Starring: Jean-Claude Van Damme; Sveva Alviti; Sami Bouajila
- Cinematography: Robrecht Heyvaert
- Edited by: Benjamin Courtines
- Distributed by: Blue Fox Entertainment
- Release dates: August 22, 2018 (France); January 11, 2019 (USA)
- Running time: 94 minutes
- Countries: France; Belgium
- Languages: French, Flemish, English

The Bouncer (Original title: Lukas) is a 2018 French-Belgian action thriller film directed by Julien Leclercq, starring Jean-Claude Van Damme, Sveva Alviti, Sami Bouajila, Alice Verset, and Sam Louwyck. Set in Belgium, the plot follows nightclub bouncer Lukas (Van Damme) who agrees to help Interpol hunt down crime boss Jan Dekkers (Louwyck) in order to regain custody of his 8-year-old daughter Sarah (Verset) from social services.

The original version of the film, which was released in Europe under the title Lukas, is mostly in French with some Flemish, and English with everything subtitled, while The Bouncer, released a year later in the United States, had some scenes cut and is dubbed into English. The film received generally positive reviews from critics.

== Plot ==
Lukas was forced to flee South Africa after the death of his wife. He now lives with his daughter in his home country, Belgium, and works as a bouncer at a nightclub. One night, Lukas is forced to restrain a patron, who subsequently badly injures himself attempting to attack Lukas. Lukas is fired from his job as a result.

Due to the injured nightclub patron's status as the son of a member of the European Parliament, Lukas is investigated by the authorities, led by the mysterious Maxim, regarding the fight. He is pressed into going undercover at a strip club to spy on its owner, Jan, an organized crime figure, or else face imprisonment for the incident at the nightclub.

His first assignment is driving an Italian woman, Lisa, back to her hotel. He discovers that she was indicted for forgery some years ago. His bosses force him to drive to an associate, where he listens in on a conversation detailing Jan's attempt at moving counterfeit banknotes.

Lukas is asked to pick up Lisa from her hotel and drive her to a meeting with Jan and Geert. Lukas' daughter is driven away, and Lukas is forced to participate in a new assignment, the kidnapping of a crack cocaine cook. Lukas successfully infiltrates the cook's hideout and apprehends the target, escaping with Geert. Lukas has had enough of the undercover work, but Maxim informs him that he knows about Lukas' past life in South Africa, and if Lukas refuses to cooperate, he will be sent back there to face punishment for an unknown crime. Lukas agrees to remain undercover, and meets with Jan at the strip club, asking for more work.

Jan intends to trade the cook to the Dutch gangsters in return for watermarked paper for counterfeit banknotes, and tasks Lukas, Geert, and Lisa to the task. At the trade, the Dutch gangsters betray and attack Lukas, Geert, and Lisa. Lukas manages to incapacitate the Dutch gangsters in a car chase, but Geert is shot and killed. Jan, however, is satisfied that Lukas and Lisa escaped with the watermarked paper, and burns the getaway car with Geert's body inside to destroy the evidence.

Lukas sends his daughter into hiding with his bouncer friend Omar while he finishes his assignment for Jan and the authorities. Meeting with Lisa at her hotel room, she recounts to him her past life as a money forger, and he reveals to her that his wife was killed in a botched carjacking. The South African police were unable to find his wife's killers, but he did, which is why he fled South African and now lives in Belgium under a new identity. Lukas drops Lisa off at a warehouse, and informs Maxim of this. Lisa is arrested and Maxim investigates the warehouse, but discovers nothing. Lukas tells Maxim that they can still get Jan, because Jan still needs to print the counterfeit money for his buyers.

Lukas also asks Maxim to let him talk to Lisa, and Lukas convinces her to cooperate with the authorities so she does not end up dead like Geert. She agrees to print the counterfeit money for Jan so the authorities have cause to arrest and prosecute him. Jan believes that a different associate ratted him out to the police and murders him in front of Lukas.

Lukas, Jan, and Lisa proceed with forging the counterfeit banknotes at a farm. In the morning, the authorities led by Maxim raid the farm and Lukas reveals his deception to Jan, who shoots him in the chest in front of the police. Maxim then murders Jan and Lisa, and he and his unit steal the counterfeit money. After Maxim realizes Lukas is still alive, he moves in to finish him but Lukas disarms Maxim and beats him to death. Lukas then kills the other members of Maxim's unit. Badly wounded, Lukas calls his daughter.

== Cast ==
- Jean-Claude Van Damme as Lukas
- Sveva Alviti as Lisa Zaccherini
- Sami Bouajila as Maxim Zeroual
- Alice Verset as Sarah
- Sam Louwyck as Jan Dekkers
- Kevin Janssens as Geert
- Kaaris as Omar

== Reception ==
On review aggregator website Rotten Tomatoes, the film has an approval rating of 100% based on 5 reviews, with a rating of 7 out of 10.
