= The Informant (2013 film) =

- Film poster
- French: Gibraltar
- Directed by: Julien Leclercq
- Screenplay by: Abdel Raouf Dafri
- Based on: L'Aviseur by Marc Fievet
- Produced by: Dimitri Rassam; Peter Berg
- Starring: Gilles Lellouche; Tahar Rahim; Riccardo Scamarcio; Elizabeth Rohm; Peter Berg
- Cinematography: Thierry Pouget; Mika Cotellon
- Edited by: Mickael Dumontier; Arthur Tarnowski
- Music by: Clinton Shorter
- Distributed by: SND Films (France)
- Release dates: 24 August 2013 (Angoulême); 11 September 2013 (France)
- Running time: 110 minutes
- Countries: France; Canada
- Language: French
- Budget: $22.8 million
- Box office: $2.3 million

The Informant (French: Gibraltar), also known as Border Informant, is a 2013 French crime thriller film written and directed by Julien Leclercq.

== Plot ==
Marc Duval is a bar owner in Gibraltar. He is cornered by his creditors, so he agrees to become a paid informant for the French customs to report drug trafficking. He quickly finds himself drawn into events more and more dangerous and ends up being prosecuted as number two in a major drugs operation.

== Cast ==
- Gilles Lellouche as Marc Duval
- Tahar Rahim as Redjani Belimane
- Riccardo Scamarcio as Mario / Claudio Pasco Lanfredi
- Raphaëlle Agogué as Clara Duval
- Mélanie Bernier as Cécile Duval
- Philippe Nahon as Glacose
- Aidan Devine as Bobby Sims
- Vlasta Vrána as Nichols
- Alban Lenoir as Philippe
- Joe Cobden as Agent Carlyle
- Youssef Hajdi as The Messenger

== Locations ==
The action takes place mostly in the area around La Línea, Gibraltar, and Algeciras in Andalucía, Southern Spain, and in the Strait that separates the Spanish mainland from Morocco. Marc's bar is opposite the entrance to the marketplace in La Línea, the frontier town with Gibraltar. Other scenes feature Algeciras port and the Gibraltar border and airport. It is the mid-1980s, after the Spanish transition to democracy and before the sophistication of the drugs trade across the Strait became more complex.

== Reception ==
Review aggregation website Rotten Tomatoes reported an approval rating of 25%, based on eight reviews, with an average score of 4.75/10.
