= Saint-Jean-de-Luz International Film Festival =

International Film Festival held in France

- Predecessor: International Festival of Young Directors
- Established: 2014
- Artistic director: Patrik Fabre
- Website: fifsaintjeandeluz.com

Saint-Jean-de-Luz International Film Festival is a film festival annually held in the Basque city of Saint-Jean-de-Luz.

== Profile ==
The Saint-Jean-de-Luz International Film Festival is the successor of the International Festival of Young Directors, which has been held in Saint-Jean-de-Luz since 1996. The festival celebrates emerging filmmakers, their debuts and sophomore features. Patrik Fabre has been the festival's artistic director since its inception. The Saint-Jean-de-Luz International Film Festival takes place every October in the Basque city of Saint-Jean-de-Luz on the premises of the Cinéma Le Sélect, 10 feature films and 8 shorts are selected for the main competition. Along with screenings, the Festival hosts various events such as masterclasses, open talks, discussions with the cinema professionals.

== Editions ==
The very first edition of the Festival took place in September 2014. The jury, headed by Xavier Beauvois, included composer Alex Beaupain, Michèle Laroque, and others.

The second edition of the Festival took place from 6 to 10 October, 2015. The jury was chaired by Josiane Balasko, and the members were Olivier Marchal, Manu Payet, Claude Perron, Julia Piaton, Alexis Rault, and Gilles Sacuto. Best Film, Best Actress and the Audience Award went to Leyla Bouzid's debut feature As I Open My Eyes.

The third edition took place from 4 to 8 October, 2016. The jury was headed by Cédric Klapisch, other members were Stéfi Celma, Maxime Delauney, Alice Isaaz, Louis-Julien Petit, Marco Prince, and Sophie Verbeeck. The Grand Prix was awarded to The Happiest Day in the Life of Olli Mäki by Juho Kuosmanen.

In 2017, the 4th edition of the Festival took place from 3 to 7 October. The jury, chaired by Michèle Laroque, gave the Grand Prix to Xavier Legrand's Custody.

The 5th edition took place from 1 to 6 November, 2018. The women-only jury was headed by Corinne Masiero. The Grand Prix was given to the political comedy Tel Aviv on Fire by Sameh Zoabi.

The 7th edition took place from 5 to 11 October, 2020. A jury headed up by director Xavier Legrand awarded with the Grand Prix Naël Marandin's Beasts.

The 8th edition lasted from 4 to 10 October, 2021. Thierry Klifa headed the jury, other members were Florence Loiret Caille, Lolita Chammah, Nadège Beausson-Diagne, and Christophe Rossignon. Aurélie Saada's Rose was the opening film.

The 9th edition of the festival took place from 3 to 9 October, 2022, its theme was announced as Cinema of the future. The jury was headed by the actress Géraldine Pailhas, she was sided by designer Jean-Paul Gaultier, comedian Valérie Karsenti, directors Stéphane Foenkinos and Charlène Favier. The Youth Jury Prize for Feature Film was awarded to Guillaume Gouix for Amore Mio.

The 10th edition of the festival took place from 2 to 8 October, 2023. The jury was headed by Agnès Jaoui and included William Lebghil, Guillaume de Tonquedec, Sarah Suco, and Alysson Paradis. Thanks to the Porosus Endowment Fund, the money prize will be given to the winners, for example, 10000 euros for the Best Feature and 2500 for the best short.
