= The Crew (2015 film) =

- Film poster
- French: Braqueurs
- Directed by: Julien Leclercq
- Written by: Simon Moutaïrou; Julien Leclercq
- Produced by: Julien Leclercq; Julien Madon
- Starring: Sami Bouajila; Guillaume Gouix; Youssef Hajdi; Kaaris
- Cinematography: Philip Lozano
- Edited by: Mickael Dumontier
- Production companies: Labyrinthe Films; SND Films
- Distributed by: SND Films
- Release dates: 7 October 2015 (Busan); 4 May 2016 (France)
- Running time: 81 minutes
- Country: France
- Language: French
- Box office: $3.2 million

The Crew (French: Braqueurs) is a 2015 French action thriller film directed and co-written by Julien Leclercq. The film is about a Parisian heist crew led by Yanis Zeri (Sami Bouajila) which specializes in well-planned robberies of armoured trucks. Although Yanis has managed to survive for years as a career criminal by a combination of his sophisticated operations, his low-profile, modest style of living, and his focus on what the team is good at, after his younger brother Amine makes a serious mistake after a recent heist that entangles them with a drug gang, the gang leader forces the crew to do a dangerous heist of a heroin shipment.

== Plot ==
Yanis Zeri is the leader of a successful Parisian heist gang that specializes in robbing armoured trucks. The crew consists of his trusted friend Nasser, Frank (the boyfriend of his sister Nora), and his younger brother Amine. Yanis enjoys planning and carrying out complicated heists, and rather than flaunt his wealth or live luxuriously, he lives simply and launders the money he makes through friends and family members' businesses. When Yanis needs an explosives expert for a big job, Nasser introduces him to Eric, an experienced young man Nasser met in prison. Even though Eric uses OxyContin for the pain of a previous explosion wound, Nasser insists the group can trust him.

Amine has a modestly-paid role in the crew as driver, which Amine finds is not making him enough money. After a heist, when Amine is tasked with disposing all of the guns into a river, Amine keeps a pistol so he can sell it. When Amine sells the gun to a slum drug dealer, the gun is identified as one of the heist weapons by police and the dealer gets a 10 year jail term. The drug gang leader, Salif, threatens Yanis' sister and insists that Yanis repay Salif for the jailing of his dealer by doing a heist of a heroin shipment coming from Belgium.

Yanis and his crew intercept the heroin, but Nasser is killed in a gun battle. Yanis and Eric eventually deliver the drugs to Salif, however the handover degenerates into a shootout. When Yanis realizes that Salif has taken Yanis' mother and Eric's girlfriend as hostages, Yanis rescues his mother and kills Salif, but by the time Eric reaches his home, he finds his girlfriend has already been killed.

As police surround Salif's apartment, Amine is arrested. Yanis prepares his family to escape to Casablanca by sea, instructing his lawyer to transfer his fortune to Morocco and tell him when his brother will be transferred from his holding cell. Yanis and his crew ambush the police van and escape with Amine, but when they get to a parking garage to use their getaway vehicle, the police open fire and a shootout ensues. Yanis provides covering fire to enable Amine and Eric to escape from the police in the parking garage. The two get on a departing city bus, and watch as Yanis walks slowly out of the parking lot, where he is shot by a young police officer. The film ends with Amine and Eric arriving in a Morocco port on an old fishing boat.

== Cast ==
- Sami Bouajila as Yanis Zeri
- Guillaume Gouix as Éric
- Youssef Hajdi as Nasser
- Kaaris as Salif
- Rédouane Behache as Amine Zeri
- Kahina Carina as Nora Zeri
- David Saracino as Franck
- Alice de Lencquesaing as Audrey
- Baya Belal as Khadidja Zeri
- Steve Tientcheu as Adama

== Reception ==
John DeFore of The Hollywood Reporter calls it a "...better than average cops-and-robbers movie carried by its leading man's understated cool." and while it "...doesn't bubble up to the top level of its genre, it supplies enough pleasure and attitude to satisfy fans of post-Besson Gallic action."
