= Alice Isaaz =

French actress (born 1991)

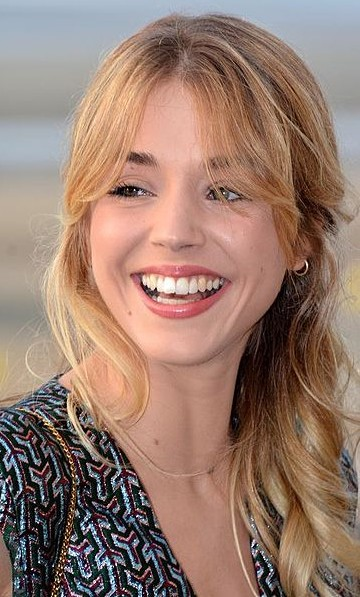
- Isaaz at the Cabourg Film Festival in 2016
- Born: 26 July 1991 (age 34); Bordeaux, France
- Occupation: Actress
- Years active: 2011–present

Alice Isaaz (born 26 July 1991) is a French actress. She is known for her roles in the films The Gilded Cage (2013), La Crème de la crème (2014) and Les Yeux jaunes des crocodiles (2014). In Driving Madeleine (2022) she played the young Madeleine.

== Filmography ==
Year	Title	Role	Notes
2011	Joséphine, ange gardien	Juliette Verdon	TV series (1 Episode : "Tout pour la musique")
2011–2012	Victoire Bonnot	Zoé	TV series
2012	Königsberg	Charlotte	Short film
2012	Les Petits Meurtres d'Agatha Christie	Juliette Larosière	TV series
2012	La guerre du Royal Palace	Marion Verdier	TV movie
2013	The Gilded Cage	Cassiopée	
2013	Clean	Romy	Short film
2014	Notre Faust	Lise	Short film
2014	Fiston	Elie	
2014	La Crème de la crème	Kelly	Nominated - Lumière Award for Best Female Revelation
2014	Les Yeux jaunes des crocodiles	Hortense Cortes	Cabourg Film Festival Award for Female Revelation
2014	Après les cours	Lucie	Short film
2015	Come What May	Suzanne	
2015	One Wild Moment	Marie	
2015	Qui de nous deux	Alice	Short film
2016	Rosalie Blum	Aude	
2016	Elle	Josie	
2017	La surface de réparation	Salomé	
2017	Endangered Species	Joséphine Kaufman	
2018	Mademoiselle de Joncquières	Mademoiselle de Joncquières	
2019	L'état sauvage	Esther	
2019	The Mystery of Henri Pick	Daphné Despero	
2019	Play	Emma Valero	
2020	Messe basse	Julie	
2021	Savage state	Esther	
2022	Driving Madeleine (Une belle course)	Young Madeleine	
2022	Night at the Museum: Kahmunrah Rises Again	Joan of Arc	
