= Julien Leclercq (director) =

French filmmaker

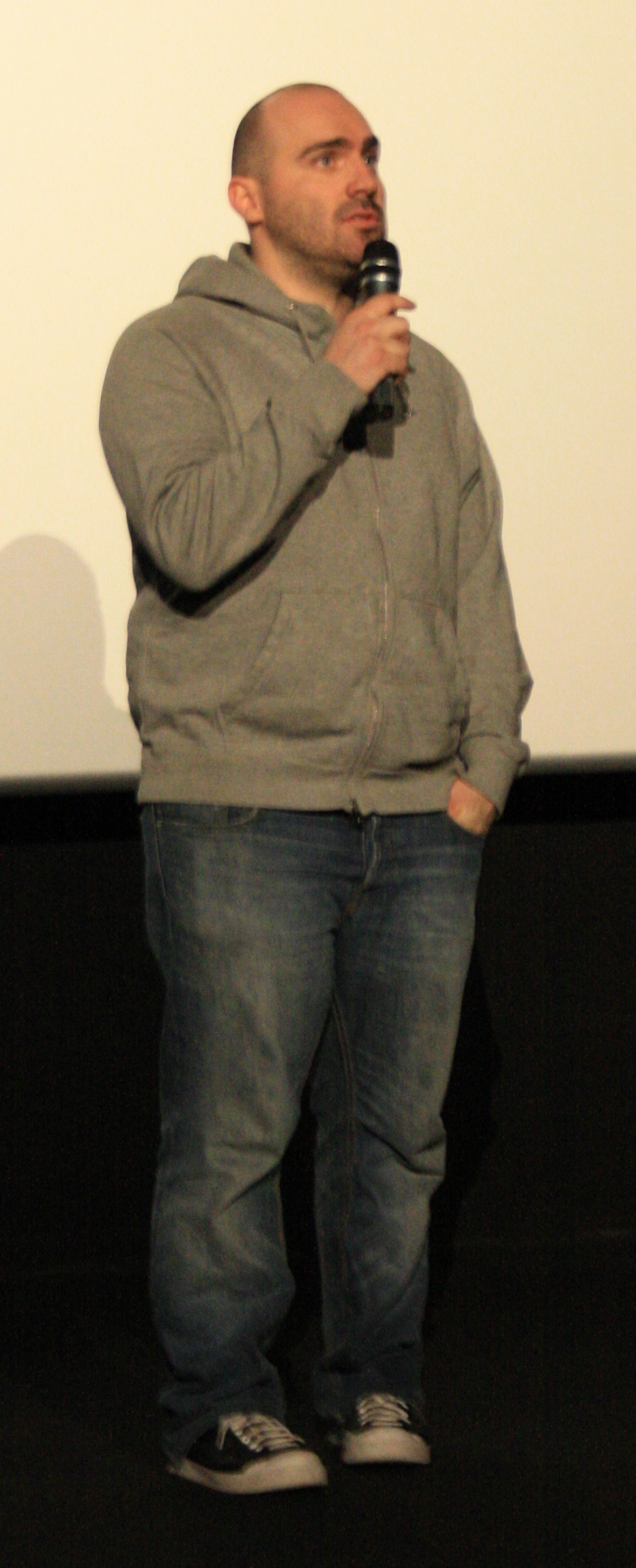
- Julien Leclercq in 2011
- Born: 7 August 1979 (age 47); Somain, Nord, France
- Occupations: Film director, screenwriter, producer
- Years active: 2000–present

Julien Leclercq (French pronunciation: [ʒyljɛ̃ ləklɛʁ]; born 7 August 1979) is a French film director, screenwriter and producer.

Julien Leclercq began his career in 2004 with the production of the short film Transit, in which he explored a retro-future world populated by half-flesh, half-metal beings. The short film got the attention of the producer Franck Chorot and Gaumont, who promptly offered Leclercq a budget of 8.7 million euros to produce his first feature film Chrysalis, the story of a police lieutenant (played by Albert Dupontel) who tries to find his wife's killer in a Paris of 2025. Leclercq returned to reality to undertake the ambitious project of L'Assaut, a film about the hijack of the Paris-Algiers flight in December 1994.

His work includes directing the 2013 film The Informant, producing the 2014 film L'Affaire SK1, and writing and directing the 2015 film Braqueurs.

== Filmography ==
Year	Title	Credited as			Notes
Year	Title	Director	Screenwriter	Producer	Notes
2000	Visions	Yes			Short film
2002	Welcome	Yes			Short film
2004	Transit	Yes	Yes	Yes	Short film
2007	Chrysalis	Yes	Yes		
2010	The Assault	Yes	Yes	Yes	
2013	The Informant	Yes			
2014	SK1			Yes	
2015	The Crew	Yes	Yes	Yes	
2018	A Bluebird in My Heart			Yes	
2018	Budapest			Yes	
2018	The Bouncer	Yes		Yes	
2020	Earth and Blood	Yes	Yes		
2021	Sentinelle	Yes	Yes	Yes	
2021, 2023	Ganglands	Yes	Yes	Yes	TV series
2024	The Wages of Fear	Yes	Yes	Yes	
2026	GIGN	Yes	Yes		TV series
