= Festival Polar de Cognac =

French crime fiction and film festival

The Festival Polar de Cognac (lit. "Thriller Festival of Cognac") is an annual French arts festival that takes place in Cognac, France, since 1996. The festival celebrates crime and thriller fiction in five forms: novels, comic books, film, theatre, and television. It awards prizes in several categories, and features lectures, debates, exhibitions, screenings, theatre performances, book signings, and more. Polar is translated as "thriller" in English.

The inaugural festival took place in 1996, founded by Bernard Bec. In 1998 it took place in March/April within the framework of the former Festival du Film Policier de Cognac, and included only novels. The first standalone festival was moved to a quieter time of year, in October 1999, taking place in La Salamandre Congress Centre, with funding from private partners. In succeeding years, various governmental bodies as well as commercial corporations provided funding.

Comics were included in 2003, from 2010, film and television were included, and in 2013 theatre was added to the offerings.

French director Jean-Pierre Mocky, a "perpetual guest" of the festival, was given a Polar lifetime achievement award in 2015.

French actor Richard Bohringer was the special guest at the 2020 festival, the 25th edition.

The nearest equivalent festival in the United States is the Bouchercon.

The 28th edition of the festival took place in October 2023. At this event, the French TV series Rendez-Vous Avec Le Crime 2, a French adaptation of the British writer Julia Chapman's Date with Malice, won the prize for best TV series.

The 2024 Festival Polar de Cognac takes place from 18 October to 20 October 2024.

== Awards ==
In 2023, the prizes awarded were:

- Best TV series
- Best Francophone telemovie
- Best short film
- Best feature film
- Jean-Pierre Mocky Prize
- Prix du roman noir des Bibliothèques et des Médiathèques de Grand Cognac (Best noir fiction of Grand Cognac libraries)
- Best international novel
- Best Francophone novel
- Best comic (One shot ou Dyptique)
