= Being 17 =

2016 film

- Theatrical release poster
- Directed by: André Téchiné
- Written by: André Téchiné; Céline Sciamma
- Produced by: Olivier Delbosc; Marc Missonnier
- Starring: Sandrine Kiberlain; Kacey Mottet Klein; Corentin Fila
- Cinematography: Julien Hirsch
- Edited by: Albertine Lastera
- Music by: Alexis Rault
- Distributed by: Wild Bunch Distribution
- Release dates: 14 February 2016 (Berlin); 30 March 2016 (France)
- Running time: 116 minutes
- Country: France
- Language: French
- Budget: $6 million
- Box office: $2.1 million

Being 17 (French: Quand on a 17 ans) is a 2016 French drama film directed by André Téchiné and starring Kacey Mottet Klein, Corentin Fila and Sandrine Kiberlain. The script was written by Téchiné in collaboration with Céline Sciamma. The plot follows the romantic and sexual awakening of two seventeen-year-old boys as their initial animosity, expressed in violence, morphs into love. Being 17 borrows its title from the second half-line of the first verse of Roman, (1870) by Arthur Rimbaud: On n'est pas sérieux quand on a dix-sept ans.

== Plot ==
Smart and sensitive, Damien is a seventeen-year-old student who lives with his mother Marianne, a doctor. His father, Nathan, is a military pilot on a mission abroad. They enjoy a comfortable life in a small town located in a valley among the mountains of the Hautes-Pyrénées.

In high school, Damien gets picked on by Thomas, a classmate, who trips him in the middle of class for no apparent reason. From then on there are constant altercations between them while playing sports and in the schoolyard. Both are outsiders at school chosen last for sports teams. In order to protect himself, Damien takes self-defense classes with Paulo, an ex-military family friend.

Meanwhile, Thomas, who is the biracial adopted son of a couple of sheep and cattle farmers, faces his own set of problems. Every day, he has to walk and bus for 90 minutes to reach the school. Marianne makes a house call to Thomas's farm when his mother, Christine, has a pulmonary infection. Christine, who has a history of miscarriages, is pregnant and has to be hospitalized for some time. As the reserved Thomas worries about his mother and the birth of a biological child to his parents, his grades in school begin to fail. Wanting to help, Marianne invites Thomas to come and stay with her family so he can visit his mother in town at the hospital and spend more time studying and avoid the long trip to school every day. This coincides with a blissful return home for Nathan for leave between his tours of duty abroad. Nathan is lovingly welcomed by his wife and son and takes it upon himself, during his short visit, to personally invite Thomas to stay with his family. Pressed by his parents, Thomas reluctantly accepts.

Sharing the same household does not seem to improve the relationship between the two teenagers. Damien resents that his mother is charmed by Thomas and accuses him of getting sick so he can be examined by Marianne. Away from home, the two boys fight each other in the mountains, and have to stop when a heavy rain comes from nowhere. While waiting for the rain to stop, the two boys share a cigarette. Thomas then suggests they swim in the lake at the top of the mountain. When they reach there, Thomas strips himself naked and Damien stares. Several days later, Damien asks a reluctant Thomas to drive to see a man whom he has contacted online for a sexual experiment. When the man tries to kiss Damien, he backs down. On their way back home, Damien confesses his feelings to Thomas, saying, "I need to know if I'm into guys or just you." Thomas does not welcome the revelation. He stops the car and gets out at the bank of a river. While trying to rebuff Damien, Thomas falls into a ditch and breaks his wrist. Realizing that the two boys have continued fighting, Marianne asks Thomas to return to his farm. The next day, Thomas arrives late for Spanish class and smiles to Damien when taking the seat next to him. He even allows Damien to dry his unwounded hand with a handkerchief. Encouraged, Damien takes the first step and kisses Thomas, who initially seems to welcome and return the affection, but then pushes Damien away and hits him in the face when Damien timidly follows him to the lockers. Thomas is expelled from school. Damien tells his mother why Thomas hit him, revealing his true feelings for Thomas. Marianne is sympathetic to her son.

Nathan is killed in a mission, shattering the lives of his wife and son. After the funeral, Thomas embraces Damien while consoling him. As Marianne falls into a deep depression, Thomas moves back to live with them to help look after Marianne. He keeps her company while Damien is away at school. The relationship between the two boys warms up. They work together, discussing a classroom project on desire. When Marianne finds the strength to go back to work, it is time for Thomas to return to his farm. Marianne goes to bed earlier that night. Damien tells Thomas that he still loves him and that he is not ashamed of his feelings. Thomas asks him to shut up and kisses him on the mouth. The two boys then make love and top each other. The next morning, Thomas leaves before Damien wakes up. Damien goes to Thomas's farm where they talk about the previous night and their feelings. Thomas is happy to have Damien on the farm, but each time Damien tries to kiss him, he says "not here", though he doesn't regret having sex with Damien. Several weeks or months later, a nervous Thomas is seen punching on the door to Damien's family house and asking Damien to stay with him as he gets a superstitious panic that he might bring bad luck when his mother is in labor. Marianne and Damien accompany him to the happy occasion. Marianne decides that it is better for her to take a job offer and move to Lyon. She tells her son that Thomas can come and visit, but Damien is doubtful. Marianne then tells him that he has to have more confidence in himself and in life. In the last scene, Thomas races down the mountain from his home to meet Damien who is on his way up to see him. They passionately kiss ...

== Cast ==
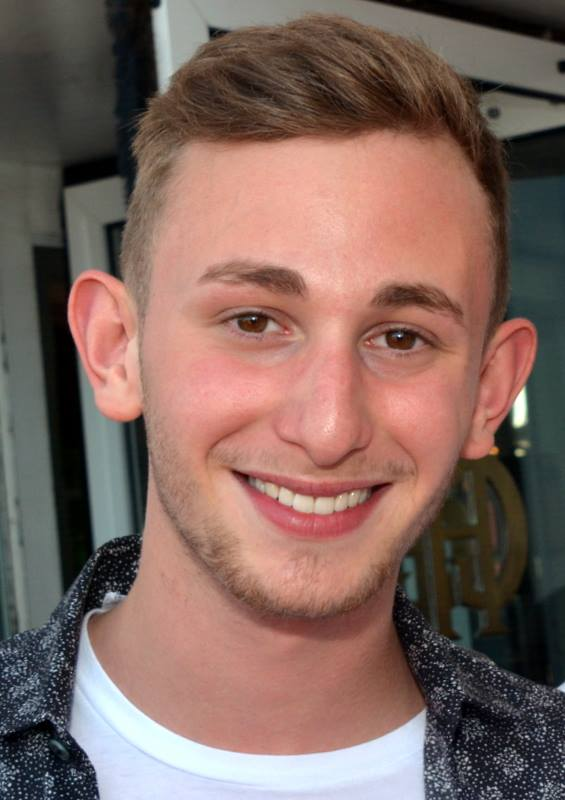
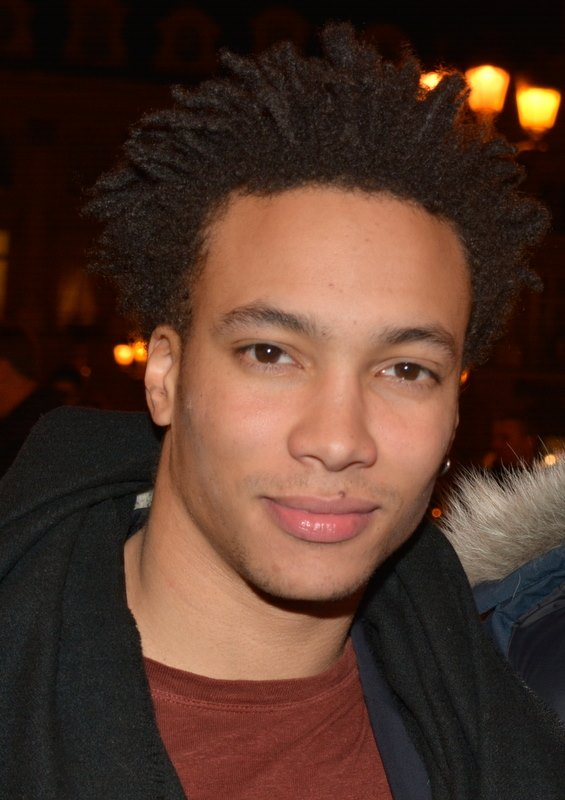
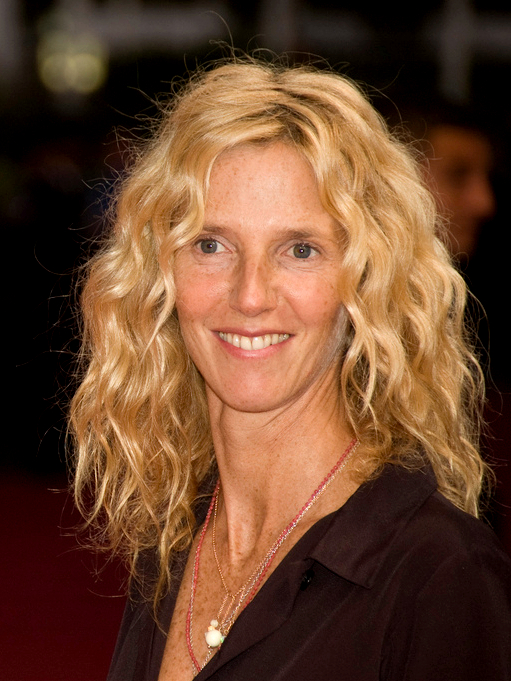
The film stars Kacey Mottet Klein, Corentin Fila and Sandrine Kiberlain.
- Sandrine Kiberlain : Dr. Marianne Delille
- Kacey Mottet Klein : Damien Delille
- Corentin Fila : Thomas Chardoul
- Alexis Loret : Nathan Delille
- Jean Corso : Paulo
- Jean Fornerod : Jacques Chardoul
- Mama Prassinos : Christine Chardoul

== Production ==
For his 21st feature film, director André Téchiné returned to the theme of adolescent life more than twenty years after his success with Wild Reeds (1994). The script was written by Téchiné in collaboration with Céline Sciamma, director of three coming-of-age films: Water Lilies (2007), Tomboy (2011) and Girlhood (2014). About their collaboration, Téchiné explained: "I had a lot of admiration for what she's brought to French film, the innovative side of her work on adolescence, and I knew that my film would revolve around two teenagers. Moreover, I wanted the film to contain as little dialogue as possible, for it to be as physical as possible as you have these characters that aren't capable of putting their experience into words at all. In writing the screenplay, myself and Céline very much agreed on this, on creating something extremely minimalistic when it came to dialogue."

The film was produced by Fidélité Films. Shooting took place in around Bagnères-de-Luchon (Haute-Garonne) encompassing two different periods: a winter session, wrapped on 13 February 2015, and several weeks in the summer (from 25 June-31 July 2015). Téchiné choose to set the story in Southwest France in the Hautes-Pyrénées, with its mountainous landscapes, a region of the country rarely depicted in films. Téchiné commented: "I thought that would visually work very well. It also struck me that these mountains, with their evil charm and enchanting quality, seem to belong to a magical world like that of adolescence, which is lost when you enter the altogether more pragmatic adult world" Filming also took place in Saint-Girons, in the Ariège department.

== Reception ==
The film premiered in competition at the 66th Berlin International Film Festival. It garnered a widespread critical acclaim. It holds a positive rating of 94% on Rotten Tomatoes based on 31 reviews.

Stephen Holden of The New York Times described the film as "A touching drama about raging hormones, bullying and sexual awakening - and the strongest film in many years by the post-New Wave French director André Téchiné."

In the Los Angeles Times Justin Chang commented, " Being 17 unfolds over the course of a year divided into three chapters, or "trimesters," as they're labeled on screen. It's a reference to the term schedule of the French school system, but also to the new life developing in Christine's womb — a fitting choice for a movie that plays, by the end, like the work of an artist newly born".

Film critic Glenn Kenny from RogerEbert.com quoted from the film, "Need is part of nature … desire is not of natural origin. It is superfluous. So goes a reading in one of Thomas and Damien's school assignments. The project of Being 17, which is realized via the accretion of dozens of wonderful details, is to prove that assertion entirely wrong, to celebrate desire as the most natural and necessary thing in our lives".

Writing for The Hollywood Reporter, David Rooney called the film "quite extraordinary ... an ultra-naturalistic slice of rocky adolescent life that combines violence and sensuality, wrenching loss and tender discovery."

== Accolades ==
Award / Film Festival	Category	Recipients and nominees	Result
Apolo Awards	Best Original Screenplay	Céline Sciamma, André Téchiné	Nominated
Apolo Awards	Best Supporting Actress	Sandrine Kiberlain	Won
Apolo Awards	Best New Actor	Corentin Fila	Nominated
Berlin International Film Festival	Golden Bear		Nominated
César Awards	Most Promising Actor	Corentin Fila	Nominated
César Awards	Most Promising Actor	Kacey Mottet Klein	Nominated
Dorian Awards	LGBTQ Film of the Year		Nominated
Lumière Awards	Best Male Revelation	Corentin Fila	Nominated
Lumière Awards	Best Male Revelation	Kacey Mottet Klein	Nominated
Outfest	Grand Jury Award		Won
