= La Fémis =

Film school in Paris, France

École nationale supérieure des Métiers de l'Image et du Son
- Other names: La Fémis
- Type: Grande école
- Established: 1943 (IDHEC), 1986 (La Fémis)
- Academic affiliations: PSL Research University; CILECT; Minister of Culture of France
- President: Michel Hazanavicius
- Director: Nathalie Coste-Cerdan
- Administrative staff: 650
- Postgraduates: 200
- Other students: 30
- Location: 6 rue Francoeur, 75018, Paris, France; 48.8904°N 2.3426°E
- Campus: Urban Pathé Studios

La Fémis (French: École nationale supérieure des Métiers de l'Image et du Son; "National Institute for Professional Image and Sound", formerly known as the Institut des hautes études cinématographiques, IDHEC) is a French grande école and the film and television school of PSL Research University. Its alumni have won many of the world's most prestigious film prizes – Cannes Film Festival's Golden Palm, Venice Film Festival's Golden Lion and Berlin International Film Festival's Golden Bear – 11 times, making it the most rewarded film school in the world, preceding the Beijing Film Academy and the Tisch School of the Arts of New York City, in winning those three prizes.

FEMIS (French: [femis]) is an acronym for Fondation européenne pour les Métiers de l'Image et du Son ("European Foundation for the Professions of Image and Sound"). Based in Paris, La Fémis is renowned for the breadth and quality of its resources, as well as the extreme selectivity of its entrance exams—about a 3% acceptance rate overall, and just 1% for the directing department. Its programs balance artistic exploration, technical training, and professional development.

== History ==
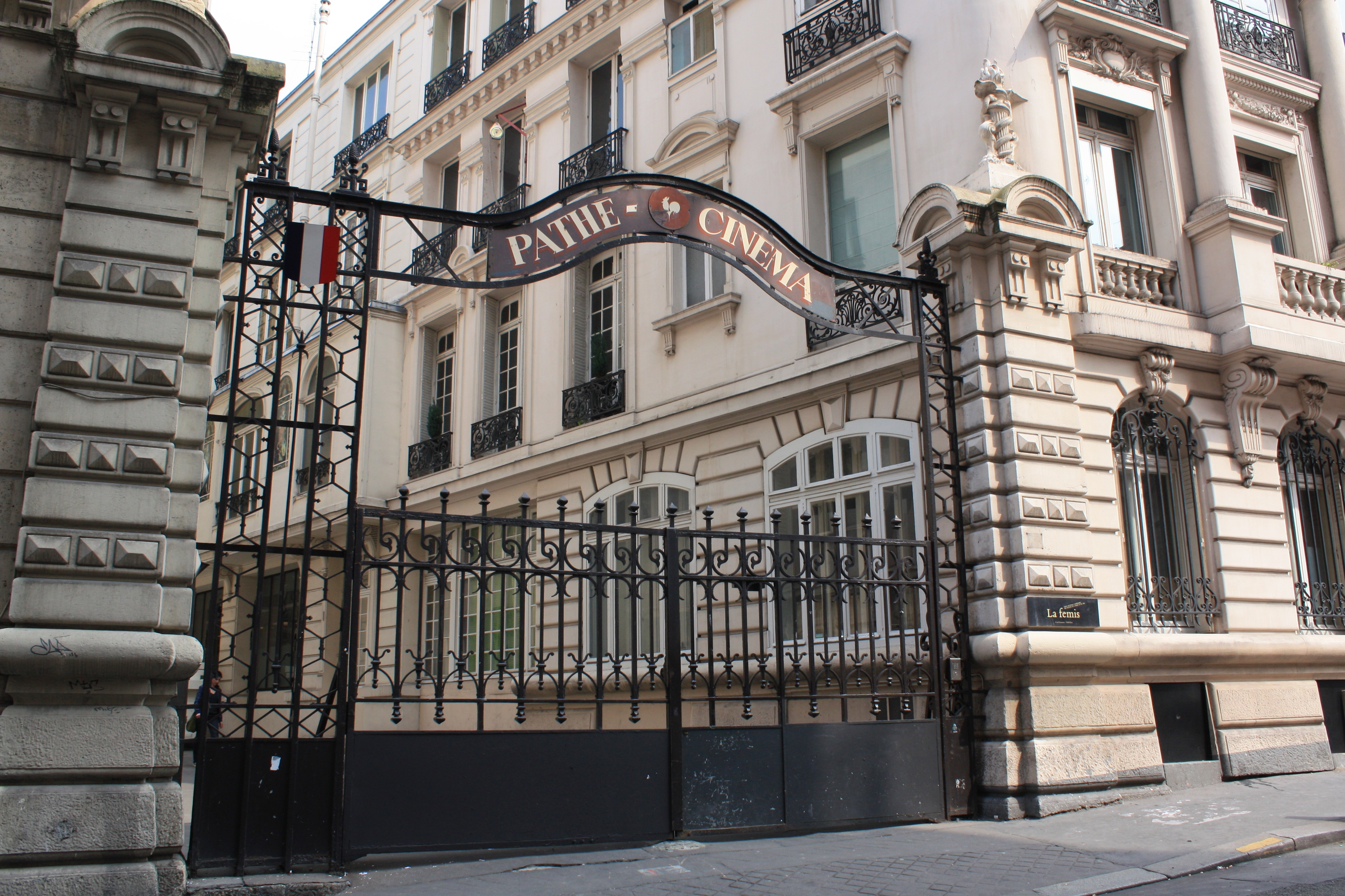
Headquarters of La Fémis at the Francoeur Studios in Paris.

From 1944 to 1985, the IDHEC (Institut des hautes études cinématographiques) was the main French film school — training 1,439 French and foreign film professionals.

In 1985, the school was restructured under the supervision of the then Minister of Culture Jack Lang and La Fémis was created in 1986. Originally, scriptwriter Jean-Claude Carrière was its president and Jack Gajos was its director.

When La Fémis was created, the school had seven teaching departments: direction, screenwriting, picture, sound, editing, production, and set design. A script continuity course was added in 1992 and a distribution/exploitation course in 2003. Lastly the master-class workshop, a European production training program, was co-created with the Filmakademie Baden-Württemberg, Ludwigsburg, Germany in 2002. La Fémis is a full member of CILECT, the international network of film schools.

The school is now a public establishment under the responsibility of the Ministry of culture and communication. The school first opened in the Palais de Tokyo (Paris 16e), moving on 15 February 1999, to the old Rapid Film - Pathé Studios at 6, rue Francoeur (18e). Their founder and French prime class producer Bernard Natan was deported by the Nazis in 1942.

In 2019 the French director Michel Hazanivicius was appointed as chairman of the board.

== Curriculum ==
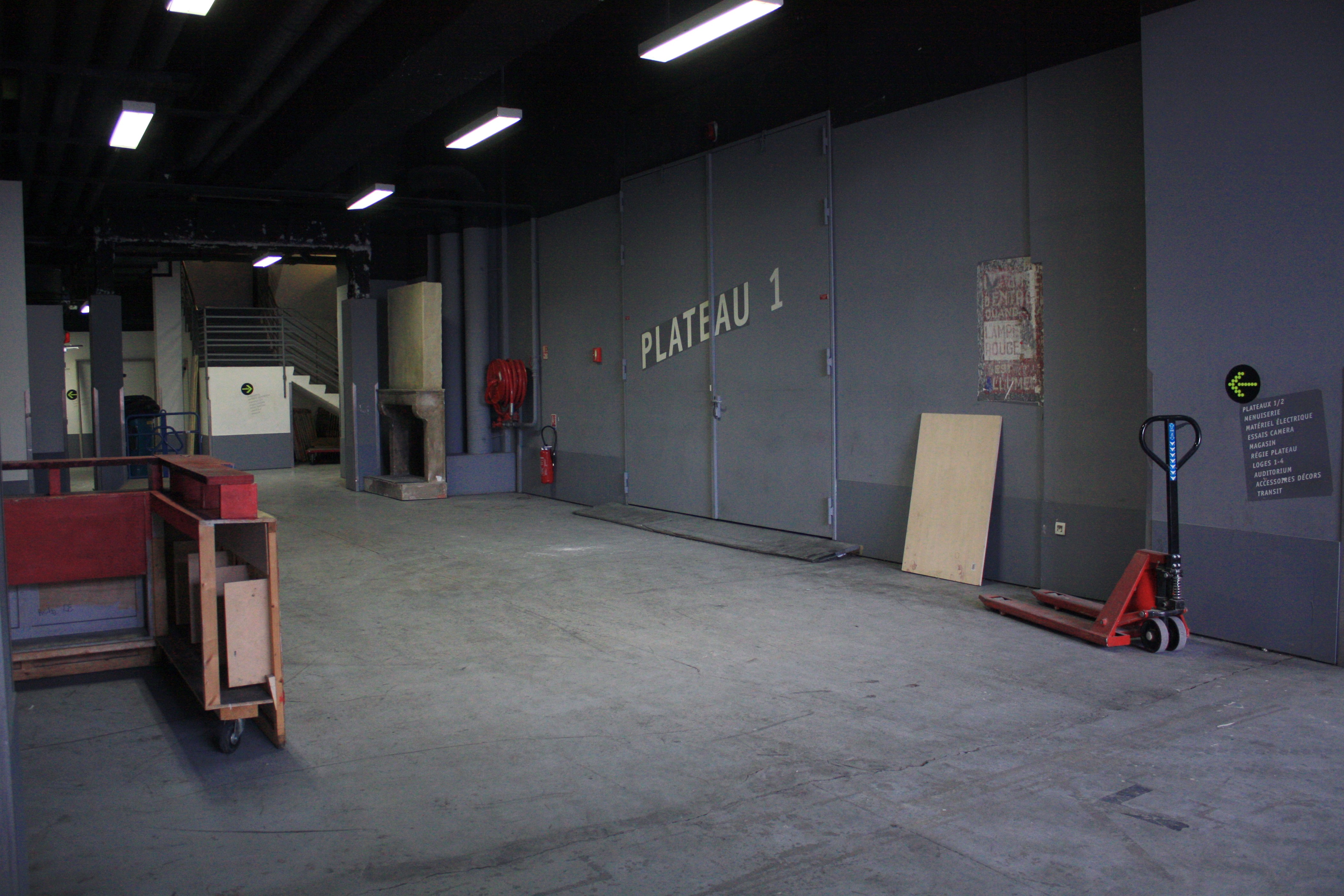
La Femis (film set 1)

The main curriculum students follow a four-year training course. During the first year, they all follow the same general course: initiation into the various jobs involved in filmmaking, experimenting in every technical position within a film crew.

During the second and third year, they follow a specific curriculum depending on the department they have chosen, including theoretical classes, exercises, days devoted to film analysis, analytical seminars and collective exercises making films. They spend their fourth year fulfilling an individual end-of-studies project (known as "travail de fin d'études" or TFE) and taking part in their classmates' projects.

In sum, the school is designed to foster an applied cinephilia, in which the study of films past and present underwrites advanced skills in the practicalities of filmmaking; returning alumni, like Jean Paul Civeyrac, who come back to themselves lead seminars, carry on this tradition of encouraging advanced auteurist ambitions among the new students.

The school is the subject of a 2016 French film called Le Concours (The Graduation), directed by Claire Simon about the exhaustive application process to be accepted as a student.

== Rankings ==
In 2012, The Hollywood Reporter rated La Fémis no. 6 in its best international film school rankings (it included U.S.-based film schools) and no. 3 in its 2014 best international film school rankings (it excluded U.S.-based film schools). Its alumni have won many of the world's most prestigious film prizes – Cannes Film Festival's Golden Palm, Venice Film Festival's Golden Lion and Berlin International Film Festival's Golden Bear – 11 times, making it the most rewarded film school in the world, preceding the Beijing Film Academy and the Tisch School of the Arts of New York City, in winning those three prizes.

== Alumni ==
La Fémis has trained over 700 students in all filmmaking trades: directors, screenwriters, producers, editors, cameramen, sound engineers, decorators, script supervisors, distributors and exhibition managers/executives.

Among them: (in alphabetical order)

- Marie Amachoukeli – Screenwriting Department, class of 2007
- Raja Amari – Screenwriting Department, class of 1998
- Sólveig Anspach – Directing Department, class of 1990
- Emmanuelle Bercot – Directing Department, class of 1998
- Renée Blanchar – Directing Department, class of 1990
- Isabelle Boni-Claverie – Screenwriting Department, class of 2000
- Leyla Bouzid – Directing Department, class of 2011
- Claire Burger – Editing Department, class of 2008
- Daniel H. Byun – Directing Department, class of 1997
- Thomas Cailley – Screenwriting Department, class of 2011
- Jon Carnoy – Directing Department, class of 1993
- Yves Caumon – Directing Department, class of 1991
- Jean-Paul Civeyrac – Directing Department, class of 1991
- Samuel Collardey – Cinematography Department, class of 2005
- Bénédicte Couvreur – Producing Department, class of 1998
- Olivier Delbosc – Producing Department, class of 1996
- Jean-Baptiste de Laubier – Directing Department, class of 2005
- Émilie Deleuze – Directing Department, class of 1990
- Arnaud des Pallières – Directing Department, class of 1990
- Marina de Van – Directing Department, class of 1997
- Julia Ducournau – Screenwriting Department, class of 2008
- Deniz Gamze Ergüven – Directing Department, class of 2006
- Léa Fehner – Screenwriting Department, class of 2006
- Sophie Fillières – Directing Department, class of 1990
- Crystel Fournier – Cinematography Department, class of 1998
- Pauline Gaillard – Editing Department, class of 2000
- Delphine Gleize – Screenwriting Department, class of 1998
- Mikhaël Hers – Producing Department, class of 2004
- Armel Hostiou – Cinematography Department, class of 2003
- Ismaël El Iraki – Directing Department, class of 2008
- Kamen Kalev – Cinematography Department, class of 2002
- Nikolay Khomeriki – Directing Department, class of 2005
- Kamal Lazraq – Directing Department, class of 2011
- Quentin Lepoutre – Sound Production Department, class of 2011
- Yorick Le Saux – Cinematography Department, class of 1994
- Teddy Lussi-Modeste – Screenwriting Department, class of 2004
- Noémie Lvovsky – Screenwriting Department, class of 1990
- Julien Magnat – Directing Department, class of 2000
- Laetitia Masson – Cinematography Department, class of 1991
- Marc Missonnier – Producing Department, class of 1996
- Emmanuel Mouret – Directing Department, class of 1998
- Léa Mysius – Screenwriting Department, class of 2014
- François Ozon – Directing Department, class of 1994
- Vladimir Perišić – Directing Department, class of 2003
- Manuel Pradal – Directing Department, class of 1990
- Céline Sciamma – Screenwriting Department, class of 2005
- Andrea Sedláčková – Editing Department, class of 1994
- Partho Sen-Gupta – Directing Department, class of 1997
- Léonor Serraille – Screenwriting Department, class of 2013
- Fanny Sidney – Directing Department, class of 2015
- Morgan Simon – Screenwriting Department, class of 2012
- Ramata-Toulaye Sy – Screenwriting Department, class of 2015
- David Thion – Producing Department, class of 1999
- Eskil Vogt – Directing Department, class of 2004
- Alice Winocour – Screenwriting Department, class of 2002
- Rebecca Zlotowski – Screenwriting Department, class of 2007

=== Screenwriting Workshop ===
- Alix Delaporte (1999)
- Kaouther Ben Hania (2005)
- Coralie Fargeat (2010)
- César Díaz (2011)
- Alexe Poukine (2013)
- Laurent Micheli (2015)

=== Documentary Film Workshop ===
- Alice Diop (2005)

=== Summer University ===
- Bouchra Ijork (2003)
- Kaouther Ben Hania (2004)
- Anat Schwartz (2010)
- Asmae El Moudir (2013)
