= British Independent Film Award for Best International Independent Film =

Annual award given to the best foreign independent film

- Awarded for: Best International Independent Films
- Country: United Kingdom
- Presented by: BIFA
- First award: 1998
- Currently held by: Sentimental Value (2025)
- Website: www.bifa.org.uk

The British Independent Film Award for Best International Independent Film is an annual award given by the British Independent Film Awards (BIFA) to recognize the best international independent films. The award was first presented in the 1998 ceremony.

From 1998 to 2002, two categories named Best Foreign Independent Film – English Language and Best Foreign Independent Film – Foreign Language were presented, in 2003 both categories were merged into the current category.

In 2012 the category was renamed to its current name, previously the category was named Best Foreign Independent Film.

== Winners and nominees ==
=== 1990s ===
Year	English title	Original title	Recipient(s)	Country
1998 (1st)
1998 (1st)	Best Foreign Independent Film – Foreign Language			
1998 (1st)	The Apartment	L'Appartement	Gilles Mimouni	France
1998 (1st)	Airbag		Juanma Bajo Ulloa	Spain
1998 (1st)	Live Flesh	Carne trémula	Pedro Almodóvar	Spain
1998 (1st)	Marquise		Véra Belmont	France
1998 (1st)	Men with Guns		Kari Skogland	Canada
1998 (1st)	Best Foreign Independent Film – English Language			
1998 (1st)	Boogie Nights		Paul Thomas Anderson	United States
1998 (1st)	Left Luggage		Jeroen Krabbé	Netherlands
1998 (1st)	Broken Vessels		Scott Ziehl	United States
1998 (1st)	Chasing Amy		Kevin Smith	United States
1998 (1st)	The Castle		Rob Sitch	Australia
1999 (2nd)
1999 (2nd)	Best Foreign Independent Film – Foreign Language			
1999 (2nd)	All About My Mother	Todo sobre mi madre	Pedro Almodóvar	Spain
1999 (2nd)	The Celebration	Festen	Thomas Vinterberg	Denmark
1999 (2nd)	Life Is Beautiful	La vita è bella	Roberto Benigni	Italy
1999 (2nd)	Romance		Catherine Breillat	France
1999 (2nd)	The Dreamlife of Angels	La Vie rêvée des anges	Erick Zonca	France
1999 (2nd)	Best Foreign Independent Film – English Language			
1999 (2nd)	Happiness		Todd Solondz	United States
1999 (2nd)	Buffalo '66		Vincent Gallo	United States
1999 (2nd)	Praise		John Curran	United States
1999 (2nd)	Rushmore		Wes Anderson	United States
1999 (2nd)	The Blair Witch Project		Daniel Myrick and Eduardo Sánchez	United States

=== 2000s ===
Year	English title	Original title	Recipient(s)	Country
2000 (3rd)
2000 (3rd)	Best Foreign Independent Film – Foreign Language			
2000 (3rd)	Kadosh		Amos Gitai	Israel
2000 (3rd)	Beau travail		Claire Denis	France
2000 (3rd)	Those Who Love Me Can Take the Train	Ceux qui m'aiment prendront le train	Patrice Chéreau	France
2000 (3rd)	Une liaison pornographique		Frédéric Fonteyne	France
2000 (3rd)	The Emperor and the Assassin	荊軻刺秦王, Jīng Kē Cì Qín Wáng	Chen Kaige	China
2000 (3rd)	Best Foreign Independent Film – English Language			
2000 (3rd)	The Straight Story		David Lynch	United States
2000 (3rd)	Jesus' Son		Alison Maclean	Canada
2000 (3rd)	Boiler Room		Ben Younger	United States
2000 (3rd)	Chuck & Buck		Miguel Arteta	United States
2000 (3rd)	Nurse Betty		Neil LaBute	United States
2001 (4th)
2001 (4th)	Best Foreign Independent Film – Foreign Language			
2001 (4th)	In the Mood for Love	花樣年華, huāyàng niánhuá	Wong Kar-wai	Hong Kong
2001 (4th)	Amores perros		Alejandro González Iñárritu	Mexico
2001 (4th)	The Taste of Others	Le Goût des autres	Agnès Jaoui	France
2001 (4th)	Songs from the Second Floor	Sånger från andra våningen	Roy Andersson	Sweden
2001 (4th)	Best Foreign Independent Film – English Language			
2001 (4th)	Memento		Christopher Nolan	United States
2001 (4th)	Chopper		Andrew Dominik	Australia
2001 (4th)	Hedwig and the Angry Inch		John Cameron Mitchell	United States
2001 (4th)	Dark Days		Marc Singer	United States
2002 (5th)
2002 (5th)	Best Foreign Independent Film – Foreign Language			
2002 (5th)	Monsoon Wedding		Mira Nair	India
2002 (5th)	Talk to Her	Hable con ella	Pedro Almodóvar	Spain
2002 (5th)	Nine Queens	Nueve reinas	Fabián Bielinsky	Argentina
2002 (5th)	Y Tu Mamá También		Alfonso Cuarón	Mexico
2002 (5th)	Best Foreign Independent Film – English Language			
2002 (5th)	Lantana		Ray Lawrence	Australia
2002 (5th)	Ghost World		Terry Zwigoff	United States
2002 (5th)	Ivans XTC		Bernard Rose	United States
2002 (5th)	Lost in La Mancha		Keith Fulton and Louis Pepe	United States

Best Foreign Independent Film

Year	English title	Original title	Recipient(s)	Country
2003 (6th)	City of God	Cidade de Deus	Fernando Meirelles and Kátia Lund	Brazil
2003 (6th)	The Triplets of Belleville	Les Triplettes de Belleville	Sylvain Chomet	France
2003 (6th)	Secretary		Steven Shainberg	United States
2003 (6th)	Spirited Away	千と千尋の神隠し, Sen to Chihiro no Kamikakushi	Hayao Miyazaki	Japan
2003 (6th)	Whale Rider		Niki Caro	New Zealand
2004 (7th)	Oldboy	올드보이	Park Chan-wook	South Korea
2004 (7th)	Fahrenheit 9/11		Michael Moore	United States
2004 (7th)	Pieces of April		Peter Hedges	United States
2004 (7th)	Hero	英雄, Yīngxióng	Zhang Yimou	China
2004 (7th)	The Motorcycle Diaries	Diarios de motocicleta	Walter Salles	Argentina
2005 (8th)	Downfall	Der Untergang	Oliver Hirschbiegel	Germany
2005 (8th)	Broken Flowers		Jim Jarmusch	United States
2005 (8th)	Crash		Paul Haggis	United States
2005 (8th)	The Woodsman		Nicole Kassell	United States
2005 (8th)	Secuestro Express		Jonathan Jakubowicz	Venezuela
2006 (9th)	Caché		Michael Haneke	France
2006 (9th)	Brick Lane		Sarah Gavron	India
2006 (9th)	Hard Candy		David Slade	United States
2006 (9th)	The Beat That My Heart Skipped	De battre mon cœur s'est arrêté	Jacques Audiard	France
2006 (9th)	Volver		Pedro Almodóvar	Spain
2007 (10th)	The Lives of Others	Das Leben der Anderen	Florian Henckel von Donnersmarck	Germany
2007 (10th)	Black Book	Zwartboek	Paul Verhoeven	Netherlands
2007 (10th)	La Vie en rose	La Môme	Olivier Dahan	France
2007 (10th)	Tell No One	Ne le dis à personne	Guillaume Canet	France
2007 (10th)	Once		John Carney	Ireland
2008 (11th)	Waltz with Bashir	ואלס עם באשיר, Vals Im Bashir	Ari Folman	Israel
2008 (11th)	I've Loved You So Long	Il y a longtemps que je t'aime	Philippe Claudel	France
2008 (11th)	Persepolis		Marjane Satrapi and Vincent Paronnaud	France
2008 (11th)	The Diving Bell and the Butterfly	Le Scaphandre et le Papillon	Julian Schnabel	France
2008 (11th)	Gomorrah	Gomorra	Matteo Garrone	Italy
2009 (12th)	Let the Right One In	Låt den rätte komma in	Tomas Alfredson	Sweden
2009 (12th)	Il Divo		Paolo Sorrentino	Italy
2009 (12th)	Sin Nombre		Cary Fukunaga	Mexico
2009 (12th)	The Hurt Locker		Kathryn Bigelow	United States
2009 (12th)	The Wrestler		Darren Aronofsky	United States

=== 2010s ===
Year	English title	Original title	Recipient(s)	Country
2010 (13th)	A Prophet	Un prophète	Jacques Audiard	France
2010 (13th)	Dogtooth	Κυνόδοντας, Kynodontas	Yorgos Lanthimos	Greece
2010 (13th)	I Am Love	Io sono l'amore	Luca Guadagnino	Italy
2010 (13th)	The Secret in Their Eyes	El secreto de sus ojos	Juan J. Campanella	Argentina
2010 (13th)	Winter's Bone		Debra Granik	United States
2011 (14th)	A Separation	جدایی نادر از سیمین, Jodaí-e Nadér az Simín	Asghar Farhadi	Iran
2011 (14th)	Animal Kingdom		David Michôd	Australia
2011 (14th)	Drive		Nicolas Winding Refn	United States
2011 (14th)	Pina		Wim Wenders	Germany
2011 (14th)	The Skin I Live In	La piel que habito	Pedro Almodóvar	Spain
2012 (15th)	The Hunt	Jagten	Thomas Vinterberg	Denmark
2012 (15th)	Amour		Michael Haneke	Austria
2012 (15th)	Searching for Sugar Man		Malik Bendjelloul	Sweden
2012 (15th)	Rust and Bone	De rouille et d'os	Jacques Audiard	France
2012 (15th)	Beasts of the Southern Wild		Benh Zeitlin	United States
2013 (16th)	Blue is the Warmest Colour	La Vie d'Adèle – Chapitres 1 & 2	Abdellatif Kechiche	France
2013 (16th)	Blue Jasmine		Woody Allen	United States
2013 (16th)	Frances Ha		Noah Baumbach	United States
2013 (16th)	The Great Beauty	La grande bellezza	Paolo Sorrentino	Italy
2013 (16th)	Wadjda	وجدة, Wajda	Haifaa al-Mansour	Saudi Arabia
2014 (17th)	Boyhood		Richard Linklater	United States
2014 (17th)	Ida		Paweł Pawlikowski	Poland
2014 (17th)	Blue Ruin		Jeremy Saulnier	United States
2014 (17th)	Fruitvale Station		Ryan Coogler	United States
2014 (17th)	The Babadook		Jennifer Kent	Australia
2015 (18th)	Room		Lenny Abrahamson	United States
2015 (18th)	Force Mejeure	Turist	Ruben Östlund	Sweden
2015 (18th)	Carol		Todd Haynes	United States
2015 (18th)	Girlhood	Bande de filles	Céline Sciamma	France
2015 (18th)	Son of Saul	Saul fia	László Nemes	Hungary
2016 (19th)	Moonlight		Dede Gardner, Barry Jenkins, Jeremy Kleiner, Tarell Alvin McCraney and Adele Romanski	United States
2016 (19th)	Hunt for the Wilderpeople		Carthew Neal, Matt Noonan, Leanne Saunders and Taika Waititi	New Zealand
2016 (19th)	Manchester by the Sea		Lauren Beck, Matt Damon, Kenneth Lonergan, Chris Moore, Kimberly Steward and Kevin J. Wals	United States
2016 (19th)	Mustang		Deniz Gamze Ergüven, Charles Gillibert and Alice Winocour	France, Turkey
2016 (19th)	Toni Erdmann		Maren Ade, Jonas Dornbach, Janine Jackowski and Michael Merkt	Austria, Germany
2017 (20th)	Get Out		Jordan Peele	United States
2017 (20th)	The Florida Project		Sean Baker	United States
2017 (20th)	I Am Not Your Negro		Raoul Peck	United States
2017 (20th)	Loveless	Нелюбовь, Nelyubov	Andrey Zvyagintsev	Russia
2017 (20th)	The Square		Ruben Östlund	Sweden
2018 (21st)	Roma		Alfonso Cuarón, Gabriela Rodriguez and Nicolás Celis	Mexico
2018 (21st)	Capernaum	كفرناحوم	Nadine Labaki, Jihad Hojeily, Michelle Keserwani, Khaled Mouzanar and Michel Merkt	Lebanon
2018 (21st)	Cold War	Zimna wojna	Paweł Pawlikowski, Janusz Glowacki, Ewa Puszczynska and Tanya Seghatchian	Poland
2018 (21st)	The Rider		Chloé Zhao, Mollye Asher, Sacha Ben Harroche and Bert Hamelinck	United States
2018 (21st)	Shoplifters	万引き家族, Manbiki Kazoku	Hirokazu Kore-eda	Japan
2019 (22nd)	Parasite	기생충, Gisaengchung	Bong Joon-ho	South Korea
2019 (22nd)	Ash Is Purest White	江湖兒女, jiānghú érnǚ	Jia Zhangke	China
2019 (22nd)	Marriage Story		Noah Baumbach	United States
2019 (22nd)	Monos		Alejandro Landes	Colombia
2019 (22nd)	Portrait of a Lady on Fire	Portrait de la jeune fille en feu	Céline Sciamma	France

=== 2020s ===
Year	English title	Original title	Recipient(s)	Country
2020 (23rd)	Nomadland		Chloé Zhao, Frances McDormand, Peter Spears, Mollye Asher and Dan Janvey	United States
2020 (23rd)	Babyteeth		Shannon Murphy, Alex White and Rita Kalnejais	Australia
2020 (23rd)	Les Misérables		Ladj Ly, Toufik Ayadi, Christophe Barral, Giordano Gederlini and Alexis Manenti	France
2020 (23rd)	Never Rarely Sometimes Always		Eliza Hittman, Adele Romanski and Sara Murphy	United States, United Kingdom
2020 (23rd)	Notturno		Gianfranco Rosi, Donatella Palermo, Paolo Del Brocco, Serge Lalou, Camille Laemlé, Orwa Nyrabia and Eva-Maria Weerts	Italy, Germany
2021 (24th)	Flee		Jonas Poher Rasmussen, Amin Nawabi, Monica Hellstrøm and Signe Byrge Sørensen	Denmark
2021 (24th)	Compartment No. 6	Hytti nro 6 / Купе номер шесть	Juho Kuosmanen, Livia Ulvan, Andris Feldmanis, Jussi Rantamäki and Emilia Hakka	Finland, Russia
2021 (24th)	First Cow		Kelly Reichardt, Jon Raymond, Neil Kopp, Vincent Savino and Anish Savjani	United States
2021 (24th)	Petite Maman		Céline Sciamma and Bénédicte Couvreur	France
2021 (24th)	Pleasure		Ninja Thyberg, Peter Modestij, Eliza Jones, Markus Waltå and Erik Hemmendorff	Sweden, Germany, France
2022 (25th)	The Worst Person in the World	Verdens verste menneske	Joachim Trier, Eskil Vogt, Andrea Berentsen Ottmar and Thomas Robsahm	Norway
2022 (25th)	All the Beauty and the Bloodshed		Laura Poitras, Howard Gertler, John Lyons, Nan Goldin and Yoni Golijov	United States
2022 (25th)	Everything Everywhere All at Once		Daniel Kwan, Daniel Scheinert, Jonathan Wang, Joe Russo, Anthony Russo and Mike Larocca	United States
2022 (25th)	Close		Lukas Dhont, Angelo Tijssens, Michiel Dhont and Dirk Impens	Belgium
2022 (25th)	Decision to Leave	헤어질 결심, Heojil gyeolsim	Park Chan-Wook and Chung Seo-Kyung	South Korea
2023 (26th)	Anatomy of a Fall	Anatomie d'une chute	Justine Triet, Arthur Harari, Marie-Ange Luciani and David Thion	France
2023 (26th)	Fallen Leaves	Kuolleet lehdet	Aki Kaurismäki, Misha Jaari, Mark Lwoff and Reinhard Brundig	Finland
2023 (26th)	Fremont		Babak Jalali, Carolina Cavalli, Marjaneh Moghimi, Sudnya Shroff and Rachael Fung	United States
2023 (26th)	Past Lives		Celine Song, David Hinojosa, Christine Vachon and Pamela Koffler	United States
2023 (26th)	Monster	怪物	Hirokazu Kore-eda, Yuji Sakamoto, Genki Kawamura, Kenji Yamada, Megumi Banse, Taichi Ito and Hijiri Taguchi	Japan
2024 (27th)	Anora		Sean Baker, Alex Coco and Samantha Quan	United States
2024 (27th)	All We Imagine as Light		Payal Kapadia, Thomas Hakim and Julien Graff	India, France
2024 (27th)	La Chimera		Alice Rohrwacher, Carlo Cresto-Dina and Paolo Del Brocco	Italy
2024 (27th)	No Other Land		Basel Adra, Rachel Szor, Hamdan Ballal, Yuval Abraham, Fabrien Greenberg and Bård Kjøge Rønning	Palestine, Norway
2024 (27th)	The Seed of the Sacred Fig	دانه‌ی انجیر معابد / Les Graines du figuier sauvage / Die Saat des heiligen Feigenbaums	Mohammad Rasoulof, Rozita Hendijanian, Amin Sadraei, Jean-Christophe Simon and Mani Tilgner	Iran, Germany
2025 (28th)	Sentimental Value	Affeksjonsverdi	Joachim Trier, Eskil Vogt, Maria Ekerhovd and Andrea Berentsen Ottmar	Norway
2025 (28th)	It Was Just an Accident	یک تصادف ساده	Jafar Panahi and Phillippe Martin	Iran, France
2025 (28th)	Sirāt		Óliver Laxe, Santiago Fillol, Domingo Corral, Oriol Maymo, Andrea Queralt, Mani Mortazavi, Xavi Font, Pedro Almodóvar, Agustín Almodóvar and Esther García	Spain
2025 (28th)	Sorry, Baby		Eva Victor, Adele Romanski, Mark Ceryak and Barry Jenkins	United States
2025 (28th)	Sound of Falling	In die Sonne schauen	Mascha Schilinski, Louise Pete, Maren Schmitt and Lucas Schmidt	Germany
2026 (29th)	All of a Sudden	急に具合が悪くなる, Kyū ni guai ga waruku naru	Ryusuke Hamaguchi, Léa Le Dimna, David Gauquié, Julien Deris, Kôsuke Oshida, Yûji Sadai, Jean-Luc Ormières, Renan Artukmaç, Hiroko Matsuda	France, Japan, Germany, Belgium
2026 (29th)	The Black Ball	La bola negra	Javier Ambrossi, Javier Calvo	Spain
2026 (29th)	Club Kid		Jordan Firstman, Galen Core, Alex Coco	United States
2026 (29th)	La Gradiva		Marine Atlan, Anne Brouilet, Inès Daïen Dasi	France, Italy
2026 (29th)	Possible Love	가능한 사랑	Lee Chang-dong, Oh Jung-mi	South Korea, United States
