= Petite Maman =

2021 French fantasy drama film by Céline Sciamma

- Directed by: Céline Sciamma
- Written by: Céline Sciamma
- Produced by: Bénédicte Couvreur
- Starring: Joséphine Sanz; Gabrielle Sanz; Stéphane Varupenne; Nina Meurisse; Margo Abascal
- Cinematography: Claire Mathon
- Edited by: Julien Lacheray
- Music by: Para One
- Production companies: Lilies Films; Canal+; Cine+; France 3 Cinéma
- Distributed by: Pyramide Distribution
- Release dates: 3 March 2021 (Berlinale); 2 June 2021 (France)
- Running time: 72 minutes
- Country: France
- Language: French
- Box office: $2 million

Petite Maman ([pə.tit ma.mɑ̃], 'Little Mum') is a 2021 French fantasy family drama film written and directed by Céline Sciamma. Starring twins Joséphine and Gabrielle Sanz with Stéphane Varupenne, Nina Meurisse, and Margo Abascal. The film follows a young girl coping with the death of her maternal grandmother by understanding better and bonding with both her mother and grandmother in the past.

The film had its world premiere at the 71st Berlin International Film Festival on 3 March 2021, and was released in France on 2 June 2021, by Pyramide Distribution. The film received widespread critical acclaim.

== Plot ==
Eight-year-old Nelly has a maternal grandmother, disabled from a hereditary disease, who has just died in her early 60s in a care home. As Nelly says good-bye to the other residents, her mother Marion and her husband empty her room at the care home. Nelly is troubled that she did not properly say good-bye to her grandmother. They all travel on to her mother's childhood home in order to empty it out as well. Arriving late, Nelly is put to bed by her mother in her old bed.

The next day, Marion is slumped in deep melancholia at her loss and there is a tension between the parents, who have known each other since childhood. Waking the next night, Nelly tries to comfort her mother sleeping alone on a sofa. Marion is deeply upset by the whole process and leaves during the early hours without waking and saying goodbye to Nelly.

Going out into the woods to play, Nelly meets a girl her own age building a cabin of wind-fallen branches. The girl, also named Marion, is friendly and invites Nelly to help her. When it begins to rain, Marion takes Nelly to her home. They take off their wet coats and pullovers to dry, then towel their hair. After Nelly explains that she is visiting the area after the death of her grandmother, Marion tells her that her own grandmother, also named Nelly, died recently. Going through the house and seeing Marion's disabled mother lying in bed, Nelly realizes that it is her grandmother's house and Marion is her mother. Alarmed, she picks up her clothes says good-bye and flees, relieved when she returns to the house and finds her father in the present.

Nelly returns a second time to the woods and sees her mother as a girl again. They continue to build the cabin. Nelly learns that they are the same age and that in three days, Marion is set to have an operation to prevent her from developing the same disabling illness as her mother. Through repeated returns to the late 1990s, Nelly is able to learn things about her mother — such as, she harbours ambitions of being an actress, by going through some improvised play-acting — and also to spend some time with her grandmother.

The day before Marion's departure, Nelly reveals to her that she is her daughter and comes from the future. To prove it, she brings Marion to her grandmother's now empty house where she reveals to Marion that her mother dies when Marion is 31 and that Nelly loved her deeply. The two are interrupted by Nelly's father, who tells Nelly that he has finished early and wants to return in time for her mother's birthday. Marion asks Nelly to sleep over and Nelly convinces her father to let her stay an extra night so she can spend more time with Marion.

The three generations celebrate Marion's ninth birthday during the sleepover. The following morning, after a paddle around a local reservoir, Marion prepares to go to the hospital. Nelly reassures her the operation will be fine. Nelly also reveals that her mother is a sad person and she often wonders if it is because of her. Marion reassures her that she does not think this is the case. The two hug before Marion leaves for the hospital. Nelly has a final chance to say a real good-bye to her grandmother.

Returning to her grandmother's house, Nelly is surprised by her mother sitting cross-legged, who has returned for a final viewing of the house. In tacit recognition of events, as they say each other's names, the two embrace.

== Cast ==
- Joséphine Sanz as Nelly
- Gabrielle Sanz as Marion
- Stéphane Varupenne as Father
- Nina Meurisse as Mother
- Margo Abascal as Grandmother

== Production ==
In November 2020, it was announced Céline Sciamma would write and direct, with Bénédicte Couvreur serving as a producer, with Pyramide Distribution set to distribute. Principal photography began in soon after that month.

== Release ==
Petite Maman had its world premiere at the 71st Berlin International Film Festival in March 2021, where Neon bought North American distribution rights to the film the same day. A week later, MUBI acquired the distribution rights for the UK, Ireland and Turkey. It was released in France on 2 June 2021, by Pyramide Distribution.

The film screened at the Toronto International Film Festival in September 2021. It also screened at the 2021 San Sebastián International Film Festival, where it won the Audience Award.

In February 2023, The Criterion Collection announced the film would be joining the collection in May that year.

== Critical reception ==
Petite Maman received critical acclaim. On the review aggregator website Rotten Tomatoes, 97% of 218 critics' reviews are positive, with an average rating of 8.70/10. The website's consensus reads: "Small in narrative scope but deeply impactful, Petite Maman is a delicate, powerfully acted meditation on grief." On Metacritic, the film holds a rating of 93 out of 100, based on 37 critics, indicating "universal acclaim". English film critic Mark Kermode called it his favourite film of 2021, writing: "Whether you are six or 60, this astonishingly insightful and heartbreakingly hopeful cinematic poem will pierce your heart, broaden your mind and gladden your soul, even as you wipe away tears." In June 2025, IndieWire ranked the film at number 55 on its list of "The 100 Best Movies of the 2020s (So Far)." In 2022, the film received 13 votes for Sight and Sounds poll of the greatest films of all time, the most votes that any film from the 2020s received, and tied with several other classics, such as Grave of the Fireflies, Napoléon, Star Wars and Intolerance.

=== Awards and nominations ===
| Award | Date of ceremony | Category | Recipient(s) | Result | Ref. |
|---|---|---|---|---|---|
| Berlin Film Festival | 5 March 2021 | Golden Bear | Céline Sciamma | Nominated | |
| San Diego International Film Festival | 24 March 2021 | Best International Film | Petite Maman | Won | |
| Jakarta Film Week | 21 November 2021 | Global Feature Award | Petite Maman | Won | |
| British Independent Film Awards | 5 December 2021 | Best International Independent Film | Céline Sciamma and Bénédicte Couvreur | Nominated | |
| Chicago Film Critics Association Awards | 15 December 2021 | Best Foreign Language Film | Petite Maman | Nominated | |
| Los Angeles Film Critics Association Awards | 18 December 2021 | Best Foreign Language Film | Petite Maman | Won | |
| National Society of Film Critics | 8 January 2022 | Best Film | Petite Maman | Runner-up | |
| National Society of Film Critics | 8 January 2022 | Best Director | Céline Sciamma | Runner-up | |
| Toronto Film Critics Association | 16 January 2022 | Best Foreign Language Film | Petite Maman | Runner-up | |
| London Film Critics Circle Awards | 6 February 2022 | Foreign Language Film of the Year | Petite Maman | Nominated | |
| London Film Critics Circle Awards | 6 February 2022 | Director of the Year | Céline Sciamma | Nominated | |
| Independent Spirit Awards | 6 March 2022 | Best International Film | Petite Maman | Nominated | |
| BAFTA Film Awards | 13 March 2022 | Best Film Not in the English Language | Céline Sciamma and Bénédicte Couvreur | Nominated | |
| Gaudí Awards | 22 January 2023 | Best European Film | Petite Maman | Nominated | |
