= Independent Spirit Award for Best International Film =

Annual US film award

- Presented by: Independent Spirit Awards
- First award: Kiss of the Spider Woman (1986)
- Currently held by: The Secret Agent (2025)
- Website: spiritawards.com

The Independent Spirit Award for Best International Film is an award presented annually at the Independent Spirit Awards to recognize the best feature films produced outside United States.

== History ==
It was first presented in 1986, with Brazilian-American drama Kiss of the Spider Woman being the first recipient of the award.

In 2025, Flow marked the first time an animated film to win an Independent Spirit Award for any category.

== Winners and nominees ==
=== 1980s ===
Year	Film	Original Title	Director	Country
1986	Kiss of the Spider Woman	O Beijo da Mulher Aranha	Héctor Babenco	Brazil, United States
1986	Dreamchild		Gavin Millar	United Kingdom
1986	The Hit		Stephen Frears	United Kingdom
1986	Ran	乱	Akira Kurosawa	Japan
1987	A Room with a View		James Ivory	United Kingdom
1987	Men…	Männer…	Doris Dörrie	West Germany
1987	28 Up		Michael Apted	United Kingdom
1987	Mona Lisa		Neil Jordan	United Kingdom
1987	My Beautiful Laundrette		Stephen Frears	United Kingdom
1988	My Life as a Dog	Mitt liv som hund	Lasse Hallström	Sweden
1988	Au revoir les enfants		Louis Malle	France, West Germany
1988	Hope and Glory		John Boorman	United Kingdom
1988	Prick Up Your Ears		Stephen Frears	United Kingdom
1988	Tampopo	タンポポ	Juzo Itami	Japan
1989	Wings of Desire	Der Himmel über Berlin	Wim Wenders	West Germany
1989	The Kitchen Toto		Harry Hook	United Kingdom
1989	Bagdad Café		Percy Adlon	West Germany
1989	A World Apart		Chris Menges	United Kingdom, Zimbabwe
1989	Yeelen		Souleymane Cissé	Mali

=== 1990s ===
Year	Film	Original Title	Director	Country
1990	My Left Foot		Jim Sheridan	Ireland, United Kingdom
1990	Hanussen		István Szabó	Hungary
1990	Distant Voices, Still Lives		Terence Davies	United Kingdom
1990	High Hopes		Mike Leigh	United Kingdom
1990	Rouge	胭脂扣	Stanley Kwan	Hong Kong
1991	Sweetie		Jane Campion	Australia
1991	Black Rain	黒い雨	Shohei Imamura	Japan
1991	A City of Sadness	悲情城市	Hou Hsiao-hsien	Taiwan
1991	The Cook, the Thief, His Wife & Her Lover		Peter Greenaway	France, United Kingdom
1991	Freeze Die Come to Life	Замри, умри, воскресни	Vitali Kanevsky	Soviet Union
1992	An Angel at My Table		Jane Campion	New Zealand, United Kingdom, Australia
1992	The Double Life of Véronique	La double vie de Véronique	Krzysztof Kieślowski	France, Poland
1992	Life is Sweet		Mike Leigh	United Kingdom
1992	Requiem for Dominic	Requiem für Dominik	Robert Dornhelm	Austria,France, Romania
1992	Taxi Blues	Такси-блюз	Pavel Lungin	Soviet Union
1993	The Crying Game		Neil Jordan	United Kingdom
1993	Close to Eden	Урга	Nikita Mikhalkov	Soviet Union
1993	Danzon		Maria Novaro	Mexico, Spain
1993	Howards End		James Ivory	United Kingdom
1993	Raise the Red Lantern	大红灯笼高高挂	Zhang Yimou	China, Hong Kong, Taiwan
1994	The Piano		Jane Campion	Australia
1994	Naked		Mike Leigh	United Kingdom
1994	Orlando		Sally Potter	United Kingdom
1994	Like Water for Chocolate	Como agua para chocolate	Alfonso Arau	Mexico
1994	The Story of Qiu Ju	秋菊打官司	Zhang Yimou	China, Hong Kong
1995	Three Colors: Red	Trois couleurs: Rouge	Krzysztof Kieślowski	France, Poland
1995	The Blue Kite	蓝风筝	Tian Zhuangzhuang	China, Hong Kong
1995	Ladybird, Ladybird		Ken Loach	United Kingdom
1995	The Boys of St. Vincent		John N. Smith	Canada
1995	Thirty Two Short Films About Glenn Gould		François Girard	Canada
1996	Before the Rain	Pred doždot	Milcho Manchevski	Macedonia, United Kingdom
1996	The City of Lost Children	La cité des enfants perdus	Marc Caro and Jean-Pierre Jeunet	France
1996	Exotica		Atom Egoyan	Canada
1996	I Am Cuba (1964)	Soy Cuba	Mikhail Kalatozov	Cuba, Soviet Union
1996	Through the Olive Trees	زیر درختان زیتون	Abbas Kiarostami	Iran
1997	Secrets & Lies		Mike Leigh	United Kingdom
1997	Breaking the Waves		Lars von Trier	Denmark
1997	Chungking Express	重庆森林	Wong Kar-wai	Hong Kong
1997	Lamerica		Gianni Amelio	Italy
1997	Trainspotting		Danny Boyle	United Kingdom
1998	The Sweet Hereafter		Atom Egoyan	Canada
1998	Happy Together	春光乍泄	Wong Kar-wai	Hong Kong
1998	Mouth to Mouth	Boca a boca	Manuel Gómez Pereira	Spain
1998	Nenette and Boni	Nénette et Boni	Claire Denis	France
1998	Underground	Podzemlje	Emir Kusturica	FR Yugoslavia, France, Germany
1999	The Celebration	Festen	Thomas Vinterberg	Denmark
1999	Central Station	Central do Brasil	Walter Salles	Brazil
1999	The Eel	うなぎ	Shohei Imamura	Japan
1999	The General		John Boorman	Ireland, United Kingdom
1999	Fireworks	はなび	Takeshi Kitano	Japan

=== 2000s ===
Year	Film	Original Title	Director	Country
2000	Run Lola Run	Lola rennt	Tom Tykwer	Germany
2000	All About My Mother	Todo sobre mi madre	Pedro Almodóvar	Spain
2000	My Son the Fanatic		Udayan Prasad	United Kingdom
2000	Topsy-Turvy		Mike Leigh	United Kingdom
2000	Rosetta		Dardenne brothers	Belgium, France
2001	Dancer in the Dark	Danser i mørket	Lars von Trier	Denmark
2001	In the Mood for Love	花样年华	Wong Kar-wai	France, Hong Kong
2001	Malli		Santosh Sivan	India
2001	A Time for Drunken Horses	زمانی برای مستی اسب‌ها	Bahman Ghobadi	Iran
2001	The War Zone		Tim Roth	United Kingdom
2002	Amélie	Le fabuleux destin d'Amélie Poulain	Jean-Pierre Jeunet	France
2002	Amores perros		Alejandro González Iñárritu	Mexico
2002	Lumumba		Raoul Peck	Belgium, France, Germany, Haiti
2002	Sexy Beast		Jonathan Glazer	United Kingdom, Spain
2002	Together	Tillsammans	Lukas Moodysson	Sweden, Denmark, Italy
2003	Y Tu Mamá También		Alfonso Cuarón	Mexico
2003	Atanarjuat: The Fast Runner	Atanarjuat	Zacharias Kunuk	Canada
2003	Time Out	L'emploi du temps	Laurent Cantet	France
2003	The Piano Teacher	La pianiste	Michael Haneke	France
2003	Bloody Sunday		Paul Greengrass	Ireland, United Kingdom
2004	Whale Rider		Niki Caro	New Zealand, Germany
2004	City of God	Cidade de Deus	Fernando Meirelles	Brazil
2004	Lilya 4-Ever	Lilja 4-ever	Lukas Moodysson	Denmark
2004	The Magdalene Sisters		Peter Mullan	United Kingdom, Ireland
2004	The Triplets of Belleville	Les triplettes de Belleville	Sylvain Chomet	France, Canada, Belgium
2005	The Sea Inside	Mar Adentro	Alejandro Amenabar	Spain
2005	Oasis	오아시스	Lee Chang-dong	South Korea
2005	Bad Education	La mala educación	Pedro Almodóvar	Spain
2005	Red Lights	Feux rouges	Cédric Kahn	France
2005	Yesterday		Darrell Roodt	South Africa
2006	Paradise Now		Hany Abu-Assad	Palestine, Netherlands, Germany, France
2006	The Death of Mr. Lazarescu	Moartea domnului Lazarescu	Cristi Puiu	Romania
2006	Duck Season	Temporada de patos	Fernando Eimbcke	Mexico
2006	Head-On	Gegen die Wand	Fatih Akın	Germany, Turkey
2006	Tony Takitani	トニー滝谷	Jun Ichikawa	Japan
2007	The Lives of Others	Das Leben der Anderen	Florian Henckel von Donnersmarck	Germany
2007	12:08 East of Bucharest	A fost sau n-a fost?	Corneliu Porumboiu	Romania
2007	The Blossoming of Maximo Oliveros	Ang pagdadalaga ni Maximo Oliveros	Auraeus Solito	Philippines
2007	Chronicle of an Escape	Crónica de una fuga	Israel Adrián Caetano	Argentina
2007	Days of Glory	Indigènes	Rachid Bouchareb	France, Morocco, Algeria, Belgium, Japan
2008	Once		John Carney	Ireland
2008	4 Months, 3 Weeks and 2 Days	4 luni, 3 săptămâni şi 2 zile	Cristian Mungiu	Romania
2008	The Band's Visit	ביקור התזמורת	Eran Kolirin	France, Israel, United States
2008	Persepolis		Marjane Satrapi and Vincent Paronnaud	France
2008	Lady Chatterley		Pascale Ferran	Belgium, France
2009	The Class	Entre les murs	Laurent Cantet	France
2009	Gomorrah	Gomorra	Matteo Garrone	Italy
2009	The Secret of the Grain	La graine et le mulet	Abdellatif Kechiche	France
2009	Hunger		Steve McQueen	Ireland, United Kingdom
2009	Silent Light	Stellet licht	Carlos Reygadas	France, Germany, Netherlands, Mexico

=== 2010s ===
Year	Film	Original Title	Director	Country
2010	An Education		Lone Scherfig	United Kingdom
2010	Everlasting Moments	Maria Larssons eviga ögonblick	Jan Troell	Sweden
2010	The Maid	La nana	Sebastián Silva	Chile
2010	Mother	마더	Bong Joon-ho	South Korea
2010	A Prophet	Un prophète	Jacques Audiard	France
2011	The King's Speech		Tom Hooper	United Kingdom, United States
2011	Kisses		Lance Daly	Ireland
2011	Mademoiselle Chambon		Stéphane Brizé	France
2011	Of Gods and Men	Des hommes et des dieux	Xavier Beauvois	Morocco,France
2011	Uncle Boonmee Who Can Recall His Past Lives	ลุงบุญมีระลึกชาติ	Apichatpong Weerasethakul	Thailand
2012	A Separation	جدایی نادر از سیمین	Asghar Farhadi	Iran
2012	The Kid with a Bike	Le gamin au vélo	Jean-Pierre and Luc Dardenne	Belgium
2012	Shame		Steve McQueen	United Kingdom
2012	Tyrannosaur		Paddy Considine	United Kingdom
2012	Melancholia		Lars von Trier	Denmark
2013	Amour		Michael Haneke	Austria,France, Germany
2013	Once Upon a Time in Anatolia	Bir zamanlar Anadolu'da	Nuri Bilge Ceylan	Turkey, Bosnia and Herzegovina
2013	Rust and Bone	De rouille et d'os	Jacques Audiard	France, Belgium
2013	War Witch	Rebelle	Kim Nguyen	Canada
2013	Sister	L'enfant d'en haut	Ursula Meier	France, Switzerland
2014	Blue Is the Warmest Colour	La vie d'Adèle	Abdellatif Kechiche	France
2014	Gloria		Sebastian Lelio	Chile
2014	The Great Beauty	La grande bellezza	Paolo Sorrentino	Italy
2014	The Hunt	Jagten	Thomas Vinterberg	Denmark
2014	A Touch of Sin	天注定	Jia Zhangke	China
2015	Ida		Paweł Pawlikowski	Poland
2015	Force Majeure	Turist	Ruben Östlund	Sweden
2015	Leviathan	Левиафан	Andrey Zvyagintsev	Russia
2015	Mommy		Xavier Dolan	Canada
2015	Norte, the End of History	Norte, hangganan ng kasaysayan	Lav Diaz	Philippines
2015	Under the Skin		Jonathan Glazer	United Kingdom
2016	Son of Saul	Saul Fia	László Nemes	Hungary
2016	Embrace of the Serpent	El abrazo de la serpiente	Ciro Guerra	Colombia
2016	Girlhood	Bande de fillies	Céline Sciamma	France
2016	A Pigeon Sat on a Branch Reflecting on Existence	En duva satt på en gren och funderade på tillvaron	Roy Andersson	Sweden
2016	Mustang		Deniz Gamze Ergüven	France, Turkey
2017	Toni Erdmann		Maren Ade	Germany, Romania
2017	Aquarius		Kleber Mendonça Filho	Brazil
2017	Chevalier		Athina Rachel Tsangari	Greece
2017	My Golden Days	Trois souvenirs de ma jeunesse	Arnaud Desplechin	France
2017	Under the Shadow	زیر سایه	Babak Anvari	Iran, United Kingdom
2018	A Fantastic Woman	Una mujer fantástica	Sebastián Lelio	Chile
2018	120 Beats Per Minute	120 battements par minute	Robin Campillo	France
2018	I Am Not a Witch		Rungano Nyoni	United Kingdom
2018	Lady Macbeth		William Oldroyd	United Kingdom
2018	Loveless	Нелюбовь	Andrey Zvyagintsev	Russia
2019	Roma		Alfonso Cuarón	Mexico
2019	Burning	버닝	Lee Chang-dong	South Korea
2019	Happy as Lazzaro	Lazzaro felice	Alice Rohrwacher	Italy
2019	The Favourite		Yorgos Lanthimos	United Kingdom
2019	Shoplifters	万引き家族	Hirokazu Kore-eda	Japan

=== 2020s ===
Year	Film	Original Title	Director	Country
2020	Parasite	기생충	Bong Joon-ho	South Korea
2020	The Invisible Life of Eurídice Gusmão	A Vida Invisível de Eurídice Gusmão	Karim Aïnouz	Brazil
2020	Les Misérables		Ladj Ly	France
2020	Portrait of a Lady on Fire	Portrait de la jeune fille en feu	Céline Sciamma	France
2020	Retablo		Alvaro Delgado-Aparicio	Peru
2020	The Souvenir		Joanna Hogg	United Kingdom
2021	Quo Vadis, Aida?		Jasmila Žbanić	Bosnia and Herzegovina
2021	Bacurau		Kleber Mendonça Filho and Juliano Dornelles	Brazil
2021	The Disciple		Chaitanya Tamhane	India
2021	Night of the Kings	La Nuit des rois	Philippe Lacôte	Ivory Coast
2021	Preparations to Be Together for an Unknown Period of Time	Felkészülés meghatározatlan ideig tartó együttlétre	Lili Horvát	Hungary
2022	Drive My Car	ドライブ・マイ・カー	Ryusuke Hamaguchi	Japan
2022	Compartment No. 6	Hytti nro 6 / Купе номер шесть	Juho Kuosmanen	Finland and Russia
2022	Parallel Mothers	Madres Paralelas	Pedro Almodóvar	Spain
2022	Pebbles	கூழாங்கல்	P.S. Vinothraj	India
2022	Petite Maman		Céline Sciamma	France
2022	Prayers for the Stolen	Noche de fuego	Tatiana Huezo	Mexico
2023	Joyland		Saim Sadiq	Pakistan, United States
2023	Corsage		Marie Kreutzer	Austria, Luxembourg, France, Italy, United Kingdom
2023	Leonor Will Never Die		Martika Ramirez Escobar	Philippines
2023	Return to Seoul	Retour à Séoul	Davy Chou	South Korea, France, Belgium, Romania
2023	Saint Omer		Alice Diop	France
2024	Anatomy of a Fall	Anatomie d'une chute	Justine Triet	France
2024	Godland	Volaða land / Vanskabte Land	Hlynur Pálmason	Denmark, Iceland
2024	Mami Wata		C.J. Obasi	Nigeria, France, United Kingdom
2024	Tótem		Lila Avilés	Mexico, Denmark, France
2024	The Zone of Interest		Jonathan Glazer	United Kingdom, Poland, United States
2025	Flow	Straume	Gints Zilbalodis	Latvia, France, Belgium
2025	All We Imagine as Light		Payal Kapadia	France, India, Netherlands, Luxembourg
2025	Black Dog	狗阵	Guan Hu	China
2025	Green Border	Zielona granica	Agnieszka Holland	Poland, France, Czech Republic, Belgium
2025	Hard Truths		Mike Leigh	United Kingdom, Spain
2026	The Secret Agent	O Agente Secreto	Kleber Mendonça Filho	Brazil, France, Germany, Netherlands
2026	All That's Left of You	اللي باقي منك	Cherien Dabis	Germany, Cyprus, Palestine, Jordan, Greece, Qatar, Saudi Arabia
2026	On Becoming a Guinea Fowl		Rungano Nyoni	Ireland, United Kingdom, United States, Zambia
2026	A Poet	Un poeta	Simón Mesa Soto	Colombia, Germany, Sweden
2026	Sirāt		Oliver Laxe	Spain, France

== Multiple winners ==
Only 2 directors have won the award multiple times.

Wins	Director
3	(Australia) Jane Campion
2	(Mexico) Alfonso Cuarón
