= Céline Sciamma =

French filmmaker

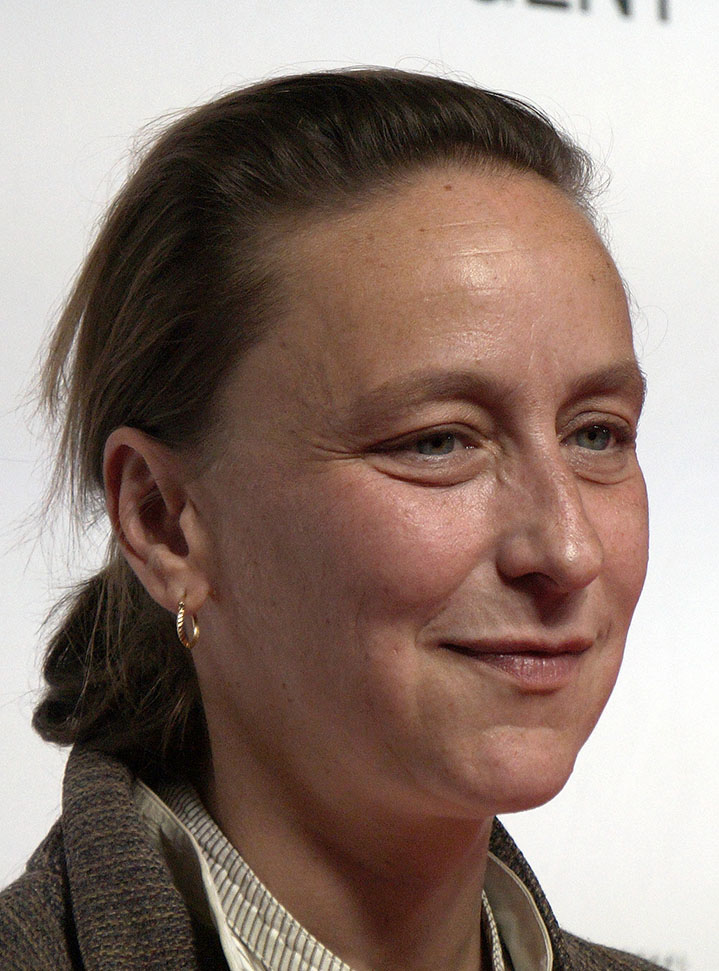
- Sciamma in 2022
- Born: 12 November 1978 (age 48); Pontoise, Val-d'Oise, France
- Education: La Fémis
- Occupation: Filmmaker
- Years active: 2004–present

Céline Sciamma (French: [selin sjama]; born 12 November 1978) is a French filmmaker. A common theme in her films is the study of the French society through fluidity of gender, sexual identity among girls and women, and the female gaze.

She is most known for her feature films Water Lilies (2007), Tomboy (2011), Girlhood (2014), Portrait of a Lady on Fire (2019), and Petite Maman (2021). Sciamma has received numerous accolades for her films, including two BAFTA nominations for Best Film Not in the English Language.

== Early life and education ==
Sciamma was born on 12 November 1978 and raised in Cergy-Pontoise, a suburb of Paris. Her father, Dominique Sciamma, a former AI researcher and IT professional, is now a figure of design education, and her brother, Laurent Sciamma, is a stand-up performer and graphic designer.

Before attending La Fémis, the French film school where she studied from 2001 to 2005, Sciamma earned her master's degree in French literature at Paris Nanterre University. As a child, she was an avid reader, and she became interested in film as a teenager. Sciamma cites her grandmother as inspiring her love of film, saying that she had a great interest in old Hollywood movies. Sciamma also attended Utopia, an art house cinema theater in Cergy, three times a week as a teenager. She wrote her first original script for Water Lilies as part of her final evaluation at La Fémis. Sciamma has said that she never planned on directing, and thought only about screenwriting or working as a critic. Xavier Beauvois, who was chairman of the evaluation panel, persuaded her to make the film. A year after finishing school, she began shooting the film in her hometown.

== Career ==
=== 2000s ===
Sciamma started her career writing the short films Les Premières Communions (2004) and Cache ta joie (2006). Her feature film debut, Water Lilies, was released in 2007. The French title, Naissance des pieuvres, means "Birth of the Octopuses", but was altered for international release. The film's script was Sciamma's senior project at La Fémis, although when she wrote it, Sciamma did not intend to direct it. The film, shot in Cergy, explores the world of synchronized swimming. Based on Sciamma's own encounter with the sport, the protagonist explores her burgeoning sexuality and attraction to the team's captain. Water Lilies was selected for screening in the section Un certain regard at the 2007 Cannes Film Festival. It won the Louis Delluc award for a first film. The film secured three nominations for the 2008 César Awards; Sciamma was nominated for the César Award for Best Debut, and actresses Adèle Haenel and Louise Blachère were both nominated for the César Award for Most Promising Actress.

Sciamma directed her first short film, Pauline, in 2009 as part of a government anti-homophobia campaign called ‘Five films against homophobia’.

=== 2010s ===
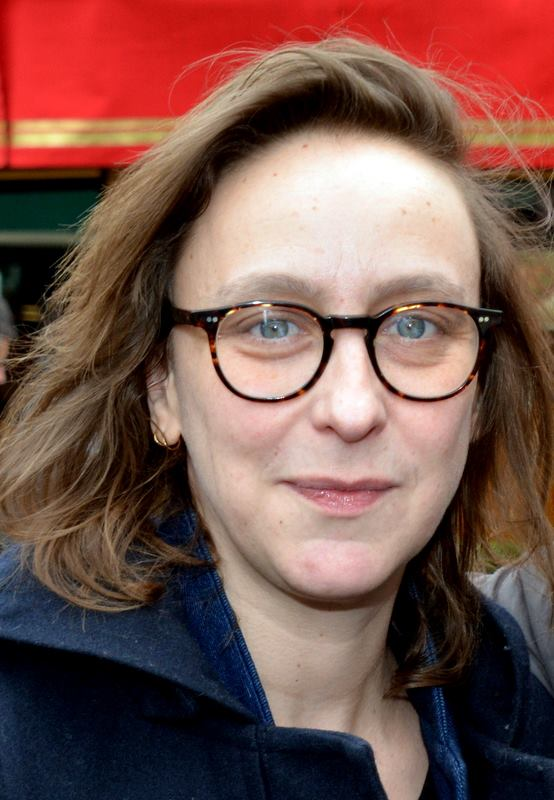
Sciamma in 2017

Her 2011 film Tomboy was written and shot in months. Sciamma wrote the script in three weeks, completed casting in three weeks, and shot the film in 20 days. It premiered at the 61st Berlin International Film Festival in the Panorama section of the festival, and won the Teddy award for films with queer topics. The film was shown in French schools as part of an educational program. Sciamma worked on TV series Les Revenants (2012) for a year and a half. She has said in interviews that she wants to direct serial television series.

Her 2014 film Girlhood was selected to be screened as part of the Directors' Fortnight section of the 2014 Cannes Film Festival. It also played at the 2014 Toronto International Film Festival and the 2015 Sundance Film Festival. In interviews, Sciamma said that Girlhood would be her last coming-of-age film and that she considered it, Water Lilies, and Tomboy a trilogy. The film, a coming-of-age film about a young woman who leaves school and joins a gang, received criticism for centering Black experiences and featuring a mostly Black cast but being directed and made by a mostly white crew.

Since 2015, Sciamma has served as co-president of the SRF (Society of Film Directors). In between directing her own films, she continues to work as a screenwriter for other directors. She was sought after by André Téchiné, whose work Sciamma admired as a youth, to co-write the screenplay for his 2016 film Being 17. She also adapted the novel Ma Vie de Courgette (My Life as a Courgette) into a screenplay for a stop-motion animated film.

In 2017, Sciamma was invited to become a member of the Academy of Motion Picture Arts and Sciences.

Sciamma's fourth feature film, Portrait of a Lady on Fire, began shooting in 2018. It premiered in Competition at the 2019 Cannes Film Festival, where it won the Queer Palm and Best Screenplay. David Sims of The Atlantic wrote, "It's a film about the deeply personal process of creativity—the pain and joy of making one's emotions and memories into a work of art. The film is a grand leap forward for Sciamma, already one of France's most exciting emerging directors. For me, it is the most enthralling cinema experience of the year".

=== 2020s ===
Sciamma shot her fifth feature, Petite Maman, in 2020; it premiered at the Berlin International Film Festival in March 2021. It also screened at the 2021 San Sebastián International Film Festival, where it won the Audience Award. That year she also co-wrote the 2021 film Paris, 13th District alongside Jacques Audiard and Léa Mysius.

In February of 2026, film distribution company MK2 Films acquired the rights to Sciamma's complete filmography. This led MK2 to premiere a re-edited version of her 2011 film Tomboy at the 76th Berlin International Film Festival, where she was awarded an Honorary Teddy Award for her cultural and artistic impact in queer cinema. This agreement completed MK2's collection of Sciamma's filmography, with the company distributing all of her previous films from Water Lillies to Portrait of a Lady on Fire.

== Style and themes ==
Sciamma frequently collaborates with Para One, who has scored all her films and directed some of her scripts. She frequently collaborates with cinematographer Crystel Fournier, who worked on Sciamma's Girlhood trilogy, among others.

She is noted for casting non-professional actors in her films, and also frequently cast Adèle Haenel, who appeared in Water Lilies, Pauline, and Portrait of a Lady on Fire. Sciamma does not believe in the idea of a muse for her pieces, and despite her personal relationship with Haenel, says that the relationships on screen are of collaboration and subversion, not fascination.

Sciamma has said that fashion and style form an important part of characterisation, which is why, though uncredited, she is often the costume designer for her films.

Sciamma has cited David Lynch as a strong influence, along with seeing Virginia Woolf as "the greatest novelist" and Chantal Akerman as "one of the most important filmmakers". Sciamma cites Hayao Miyazaki as an inspiration for filmmaking, as well as Penny Marshall's Big (1988), particularly for her film Petite Maman. Sciamma notes these filmmakers focus on themes of nature and the treatment of it as catalysts for the film.

Sciamma has spoken about the metaphorical purpose of using synchronized swimming in Water Lilies, which she said "reveals a lot about the job of being a girl," due to the tension between athleticism and feminine aesthetics.

A common theme in Sciamma's films is the fluidity of gender and sexual identity among girls and women. Her films look at lesbianism and queerness, and how this is represented on screen. She focuses on the idea of the body, and how touch is related to it within cinema. Sciamma’s notable in her thematic elements for female gaze, and many scholars have cited her as a pioneer for creating a new way of seeing women in media. She also likes to conceptualise the idea of ‘looking’, using Russian nesting dolls as a metaphor of "looking within looking".

Sciamma also regularly examines themes of family including broken families, bereavement, and adoption. By focusing on coming-of-age narratives, she examines autonomy of children and teenagers, especially in terms of gender and sexuality. Her films often capture children without their parents, and documents their metamorphosis and imagination onscreen. She is interested in their subjugation and autonomy.

Sciamma focuses on identity and representation in film, such as black identity in Girlhood and motherhood identity in Petite Maman.

== Activism ==
Sciamma is a feminist. She was a founding member of the French branch of the 50/50 by 2020 movement, a group of French film industry professionals advocating for gender parity in film by the year 2020.

She has contributed heavily to discourse with cinema on the female gaze. Sciamma uses her platform to speak about the restrictions of the male gaze and present movies that elevate the female gaze. She sees her work, particularly Portrait of a Lady on Fire, as a manifesto of the female gaze. Sciamma said in an interview: "That's why the male gaze is obsessed with representing lesbians, for instance. It's a way to control it. Our stories are powerful because they are dangerous. We are dangerous. So it's a very good strategy to despise us—to undermine us—because it's giving us less leverage for a very powerful political dynamic".

Sciamma has said that "cinema is always political" and that creating films by women and about women is a political act. In 2018, she co-organised and participated in the women's protest against inequality at the 2018 Cannes Film Festival alongside many notable women in film, including Agnès Varda, Ava DuVernay, Cate Blanchett, and Léa Seydoux. This protest campaigned for gender equality in the film industry.

At the premiere of Portrait of a Lady on Fire at the 2019 Cannes Film Festival, Sciamma and Haenel wore 50/50 pins in support of the movement.

In 2020 Sciamma and the Portrait of a Lady on Fire team joined Haenel in walking out of the 45th César Awards after Roman Polanski won the award for Best Director. In 1977, Polanski was arrested and charged with six offences against a 13-year-old girl. Haenel had previously spoken out about experiencing sexual harassment by director Christopher Ruggia. Sciamma said in an interview about the walkout, "There was no plan. It's all about the moment, a matter of seconds. It's about moving your legs, as simple as that. And that's hard. It's hard to stand up, hard to move your legs. I understand why people don't. But sometimes you have to."

== Personal life ==
Sciamma is a lesbian. In 2014, Adèle Haenel publicly acknowledged that she was in a relationship with Sciamma in her acceptance speech for her César Award. The two met on the set of Water Lilies and started dating sometime after. Sciamma was 28 years old and Haenel was only 17 when they first met. The couple parted ways, amicably, sometime before the filming of Portrait of a Lady on Fire, which also starred Haenel.

== Filmography ==
Year	English title	Original title	Director	Writer	Actor	Notes
2004		Les Premières Communions	No	Yes	No	Short film
2006		Cache ta joie	No	Yes	No	Short film
2007	Water Lilies	Naissance des Pieuvres	Yes	Yes	Yes	
2009	Pauline		Yes	No	No	Short film
2010	Ivory Tower		No	Yes	No	
2011	Tomboy		Yes	Yes	No	
2014	Bird People		No	Yes	No	Screenplay consultant
2014	Mademoiselle		No	No	Yes	Role: Fille boîte; Short film
2014	Girlhood	Bande de filles	Yes	Yes	No	
2014	Young Tiger	Bébé Tigre	No	Yes	No	Storyline consultant
2016	Being 17	Quand on a 17 ans	No	Yes	No	
2016	My Life as a Courgette	Ma vie de Courgette	No	Yes	No	
2018	With the Wind		No	Yes	No	Collaborating writer
2019	Portrait of a Lady on Fire	Portrait de la jeune fille en feu	Yes	Yes	No	
2021	Petite Maman		Yes	Yes	No	
2021	Paris, 13th District	Les Olympiades	No	Yes	No	Collaborating writer
2023	This Is How a Child Becomes a Poet		Yes	No	No	Short film
2024	The Balconettes	Les Femmes au balcon	No	Yes	No	
2026	Tutti Frutti		Yes	Yes	Yes	Documentary Short

== Accolades ==
Award	Year	Category	Film	Result	Ref.
Teddy Award	2026	Special Award		Won	
Film Fest Gent	2022	Joseph Plateau Honorary Award		Won	
British Academy Film Awards	2022	Best Film Not in the English Language	Petite Maman	Nominated	
Mar del Plata International Film Festival	2021	SIGNIS Award – Special Mention	Petite Maman	Won	
San Sebastián International Film Festival	2021	City of Donostia/San Sebastian Audience Award	Petite Maman	Won	
Stockholm International Film Festival	2021	FIPRESCI Prize	Petite Maman	Won	
Sydney Film Festival	2021	Sydney Film Prize	Petite Maman	Nominated	
Film by the Sea	2021	Le prix Vive le cinéma! – Best French Language Film	Petite Maman	Won	
British Independent Film Awards	2021	Best International Independent Film	Petite Maman	Nominated	
Chicago International Film Festival	2021	Gold Hugo	Petite Maman	Nominated	
Berlin International Film Festival	2021	Golden Bear	Petite Maman	Nominated	
César Awards	2020	Best Film	Portrait of a Lady on Fire	Nominated	
César Awards	2020	Best Director	Portrait of a Lady on Fire	Nominated	
César Awards	2020	Best Original Screenplay	Portrait of a Lady on Fire	Nominated	
British Academy Film Awards	2020	Best Film Not in the English Language	Portrait of a Lady on Fire	Nominated	
Golden Globe Awards	2020	Best Foreign Language Film	Portrait of a Lady on Fire	Nominated	
Lumière Awards	2020	Best Film	Portrait of a Lady on Fire	Nominated	
Lumière Awards	2020	Best Director	Portrait of a Lady on Fire	Nominated	
Union de la presse Cinématographique Belge	2020	Grand Prix	Portrait of a Lady on Fire	Nominated	
European Film Awards	2019	European Director	Portrait of a Lady on Fire	Nominated	
European Film Awards	2019	European Screenwriter	Portrait of a Lady on Fire	Won	
European Film Awards	2019	European University Film Award	Portrait of a Lady on Fire	Won	
Chicago International Film Festival	2019	Gold Hugo	Portrait of a Lady on Fire	Won	
Chicago International Film Festival	2019	Silver Q-Hugo	Portrait of a Lady on Fire	Won	
Filmfest Hamburg	2019	Art Cinema Award	Portrait of a Lady on Fire	Won	
Alliance of Women Film Journalists	2019	EDA Female Focus Award – Best Woman Director	Portrait of a Lady on Fire	Won	
Alliance of Women Film Journalists	2019	EDA Female Focus Award – Best Woman Screenwriter	Portrait of a Lady on Fire	Nominated	
Alliance of Women Film Journalists	2019	EDA Award – Best Director	Portrait of a Lady on Fire	Nominated	
Denver Film Festival	2019	Rare Pearl Award	Portrait of a Lady on Fire	Won	
Cannes Film Festival	2019	Queer Palm	Portrait of a Lady on Fire	Won	
Cannes Film Festival	2019	Best Screenplay	Portrait of a Lady on Fire	Won	
Cannes Film Festival	2019	Palme d'Or	Portrait of a Lady on Fire	Nominated	
Annie Awards	2017	Outstanding Achievement for Writing in an Animated Feature Production	My Life as a Courgette	Nominated	
Lumière Awards	2017	Best Screenplay	My Life as a Courgette	Won	
César Awards	2017	Best Adapted Screenplay	My Life as a Courgette	Won	
Independent Spirit Awards	2016	Best International Film	Girlhood	Nominated	
Black Reel Awards	2016	Outstanding Foreign Film	Girlhood	Won	
Alliance of Women Film Journalists	2016	EDA Female Focus Award – Best Woman Director	Girlhood	Nominated	
César Awards	2015	Best Director	Girlhood	Nominated	
Lumière Awards	2015	Best Film	Girlhood	Nominated	
Lumière Awards	2015	Best Director	Girlhood	Nominated	
Prix Jacques Prévert du Scénario	2015	Best Original Screenplay	Girlhood	Nominated	
European Parliament	2014	Lux Prize	Girlhood	Nominated	
Stockholm International Film Festival	2014	Bronze Horse	Girlhood	Won	
Philadelphia Film Festival	2014	Special Jury Prize	Girlhood	Won	
San Sebastián International Film Festival	2014	TVE-Otra Mirada Award	Girlhood	Won	
Miskolc International Film Festival	2014	International Ecumenical Award	Girlhood	Won	
BFI London Film Festival	2014	Best Film	Girlhood	Nominated	
Cannes Film Festival	2014	Queer Palm	Girlhood	Nominated	
UK Film Festival	2014	Best Feature Film	Girlhood	Nominated	
Prix Jacques Prévert du Scénario	2012	Best Original Screenplay	Tomboy	Won	
Buenos Aires International Festival of Independent Cinema	2012	SIGNIS Award	Tomboy	Won	
Buenos Aires International Festival of Independent Cinema	2012	FIPRESCI Prize	Tomboy	Won	
Odesa International Film Festival	2011	Golden Duke for International Competition	Tomboy	Nominated	
Odesa International Film Festival	2011	Don Quixote Award for International Program	Tomboy	Won	
Odesa International Film Festival	2011	Golden Duke for Grand Prix	Tomboy	Won	
Berlin International Film Festival	2011	Teddy Award – Jury Award	Tomboy	Won	
César Awards	2008	Best First Feature Film	Water Lilies	Nominated	
Torino Film Festival	2007	Holden Award for Best Script – Special Mention	Water Lilies	Won	
Louis Delluc Prize	2007	Best First Film	Water Lilies	Won	
Cabourg Film Festival	2007	Prix de la Jeunesse	Water Lilies	Won	
Athens International Film Festival	2007	Audience Award	Water Lilies	Won	
Cannes Film Festival	2007	Prix Un Certain Regard	Water Lilies	Nominated	
Cannes Film Festival	2007	Caméra d'Or	Water Lilies	Nominated	

== See also ==
- List of female film and television directors
- List of lesbian filmmakers
- List of LGBT-related films directed by women
