= Sixpack France =

French clothing brand

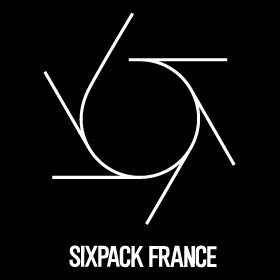
- Founded: 1998; 28 years ago
- Founder: Lionel Vivier, Fanny Baglieto
- Headquarters: France
- Area served: Worldwide
- Website: www.sixpackofficial.com

Sixpack France, (also known as Sixpack), is a French clothing brand, created in 1998 by the couple Lionel Vivier and Fanny Baglieto.

Born into the French Graffiti Scene, the brand became well known for their clothes (mostly T-shirts), coming from collaboration with famous designers and artists such as Parra, Ryan Waller, Kid acne, Gaspard Augé and also music artists and DJs such as The Bloody Beetroots, TTC, Surkin and A-Trak.

In 2009, the label produced its first movie "It Was on Earth That I Knew Joy" directed by Jean-Baptiste de Laubier. The film was presented at SCION installation, Los Angeles, on 20 February 2010.
