= Crystel Fournier =

French cinematographer

Crystel Fournier is a French cinematographer. She is best known for being the frequent collaborator of director Céline Sciamma.

== Biography ==
Originally from Mont-de-Marsan, Crystel Fournier studied at ESAV in Toulouse from 1990 to 1994 and graduated from La Fémis in 1998

She has lit around ten feature films, including Laurent Salgues Rêves de poussière (2006), Delphine Gleize's L'Homme qui rêvait d'un enfant (2006) and Carnage (2002 film) (2001), La Jungle (2006) by Mathieu Delaporte, Sauf le respect que je vous dois (2005) by Fabienne Godet, Orlando Vargas (2005) by Juan Pittaluga, Pourquoi (pas) le Brésil (2004) by Laetitia Masson, Saltimbank (2003) by Jean Claude Biette, and Clément (2001) by Emmanuelle Bercot.

She is a member of the French Society of Cinematographers.

== Career ==
Fournier began work as a cinematographer in 1998. She began working with director Céline Sciamma on her 2007 debut film Water Lilies. They continued their collaborations of the films Tomboy and Girlhood. In 2016, Fournier was invited to join the cinematography branch of the Academy of Motion Picture Arts and Sciences.

== Selected filmography ==
- Drift (2023)
- Great Freedom (2021)
- Wildfire (2020)
- Miss Marx (2020)
- Nico, 1988 (2017)
- Paris Can Wait (2016)
- The Boss's Daughter (2015)
- These Are the Rules (2014)
- Girlhood (2014)
- Smart Ass (2014)
- A Place on Earth (2013)
- Aujourd'hui (2012)
- Tomboy (2011)
- Living on Love Alone (2010)
- Un soir au club (2009)
- Water Lilies (2007)
- Rêves de poussière (2006)
- Burnt Out (2005)
- Carnage (2002)
- Clément (2001)
