= Corentin Fila =

French actor

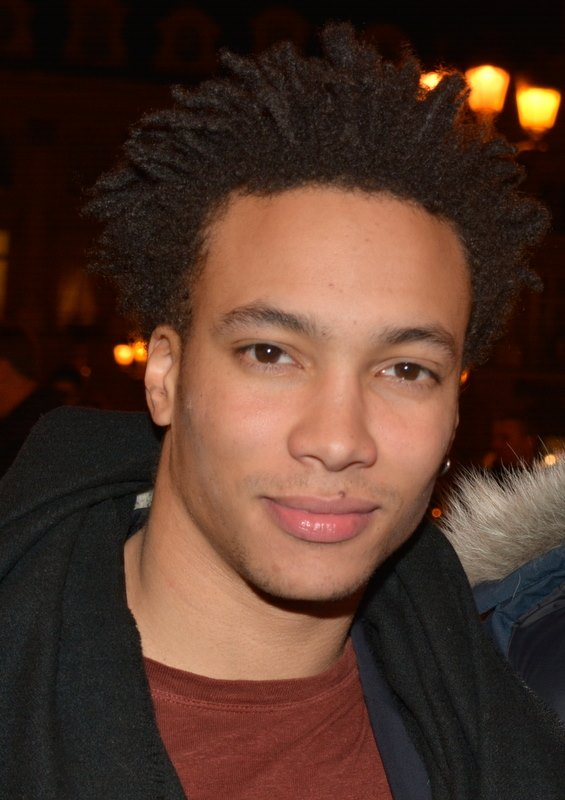
- Corentin Fila in 2017
- Born: 28 September 1988 (age 37); Paris, France
- Education: Paris Descartes University
- Occupation: Actor
- Years active: 2016–present

Corentin Fila (born 28 September 1988) is a French actor.

== Life and career ==
Son of a French specialized teacher and Franco-Congolese director David-Pierre Fila, Corentin obtained a degree in economics at Paris-Descartes while doing modeling. At the age of 23, he was inspired after watching a performance of The Suit, a Peter Brook play with South African actors, and decided to enter the acting profession. He enrolled at the Cours Florent to study acting in 2012. He landed his first major role in 2016 in the André Téchiné's film Being 17. He was nominated for the César Award for Most Promising Actor for his role in the film.

He starred in A Paris Education (Mes provinciales) by Jean-Paul Civeyrac in 2018. In 2019, he appeared in the Netflix television production, Mortel.

== Filmography ==
Year	Title	Role	Director	Notes
2016	Being 17	Thomas Chardoul	André Téchiné	Nominated - César Award for Most Promising Actor; Nominated - Lumière Award for Best Male Revelation
2016	Patients	Basketball player	Mehdi Idir & Grand Corps Malade	
2017	Jalouse	Félix	David & Stéphane Foenkinos	
2017	La vie devant elles	Fadi	Gabriel Aghion	TV series (6 episodes)
2018	Volontaire	Loïc Dumont	Hélène Fillières	
2018	A Paris Education	Mathias	Jean-Paul Civeyrac	
2019	Mortel	Obé	Simon Astier & Edouard Salier	
2024	Wolf Hall	Christoph	Peter Kosminsky	TV series
