= It Was on Earth That I Knew Joy =

It Was On Earth That I Knew Joy is a 35-minute science fiction film directed by Jean-Baptiste de Laubier and produced by French clothing label Sixpack France.

The film was presented on February 20, 2010 at SCION Installation, Los Angeles and released online on March 3, 2010.
