= A Paris Education =

2018 film

- Film poster
- Directed by: Jean-Paul Civeyrac
- Written by: Jean Paul Civeyrac
- Starring: Andranic Manet
- Release dates: 18 February 2018 (Berlin); 18 April 2018 (France)
- Running time: 127 minutes
- Country: France
- Language: French

A Paris Education (French: Mes provinciales) is a 2018 French drama film directed by Jean-Paul Civeyrac. It was screened in the Panorama section at the 68th Berlin International Film Festival.

== Cast ==
- Andranic Manet as Etienne
- Diane Rouxel as Lucie
- Jenna Thiam as Valentina
- Gonzague Van Bervesseles as Jean-Noël
- Corentin Fila as Mathias
