= Portrait of a Lady on Fire =

2019 French film by Céline Sciamma

- Festival de Cannes film poster
- French: Portrait de la jeune fille en feu
- Literally: Portrait of the Young Lady on Fire
- Directed by: Céline Sciamma
- Written by: Céline Sciamma
- Produced by: Bénédicte Couvreur
- Starring: Noémie Merlant; Adèle Haenel; Luàna Bajrami; Valeria Golino
- Cinematography: Claire Mathon
- Edited by: Julien Lacheray
- Music by: Para One; Arthur Simonini
- Production companies: Lilies Films; Arte France Cinéma; Hold Up Films
- Distributed by: Pyramide Films
- Release dates: 19 May 2019 (Cannes); 18 September 2019 (France)
- Running time: 120 minutes
- Country: France
- Language: French
- Budget: €4.8 million
- Box office: $11.8 million

Portrait of a Lady on Fire (French: Portrait de la jeune fille en feu, lit. 'Portrait of the Young Lady on Fire') is a 2019 French historical romantic drama film written and directed by Céline Sciamma, starring Noémie Merlant and Adèle Haenel. Set in France in the late 18th century, the film tells the story of a brief affair between two young women: an aristocrat and a painter commissioned to paint her portrait. It was Haenel's final film role before retiring from the film industry in 2023.

Portrait of a Lady on Fire was selected to compete for the Palme d'Or at the 2019 Cannes Film Festival. The film won the Queer Palm at Cannes, becoming the first film directed by a woman to win the award. Sciamma also won the award for Best Screenplay at Cannes. The film was theatrically released in France on 18 September 2019.

It was nominated for Independent Spirit Awards, Critics' Choice Awards and Golden Globe Awards for Best Foreign Language Film and was chosen by the National Board of Review as one of the top five foreign language films of 2019. The film was one of three shortlisted by the French Ministry of Culture to be France's submission to the 92nd Academy Awards for Best International Feature Film.

Portrait of a Lady on Fire was voted the 30th greatest film of all time in the Sight & Sound 2022 critics' poll. It has also been considered one of the best films of 2019, the 21st century, and of all time.

== Plot ==
At the end of the 18th century Marianne, a painter, is teaching an art class in France. One of her students asks her about a painting of hers, which Marianne calls Portrait de la jeune fille en feu (Portrait of a Lady on Fire).

Years earlier, Marianne arrives on a distant island in Brittany. She has been commissioned to paint a portrait of a young woman of the gentry named Héloïse, who is to be married off to a Milanese nobleman. Héloïse's mother, the Countess, tells Marianne that Héloïse has previously refused to pose for portraits, as she does not want to be married; she had been living in a convent before her older sister's suicide necessitated her return and her betrothal. Marianne acts as Héloïse's hired companion to be able to paint her in secret and accompanies her on daily walks along the rugged coastline to memorize Héloïse's features.

Marianne finishes the portrait, but finds herself unable to betray Héloïse's trust and reveals her true reason for arriving. After Héloïse criticises the painting, which does not seem to portray her true nature, Marianne destroys the work and tells the Countess she can create a better painting. As the Countess is getting ready to fire Marianne, Héloïse says that she will pose for Marianne. The Countess is shocked to hear this and gives Marianne five days to complete the new portrait while she is away on the mainland. Marianne is haunted throughout the house by visions of Héloïse in a wedding dress. One evening, they read the story of Orpheus and Eurydice and debate the reason Orpheus turns around to look at his wife, causing her to be returned to the underworld, with Héloïse suggesting that Eurydice asked him to. Later, the two go to a bonfire gathering where women sing and Héloïse's dress briefly catches fire as she stares at Marianne.

The next day, Marianne and Héloïse share their first kiss and have sex later that night. They spend the next few days together, during which their bond grows stronger, and help the housemaid, Sophie, get an abortion. With their relationship about to be cut short by the Countess's return, Marianne sketches a drawing of Héloïse to remember her by, and Héloïse asks Marianne to draw a nude sketch of herself on page 28 of her book. The Countess approves of the new portrait, and the next morning Marianne bids her a brief but emotional farewell. As she is about to leave the house, she hears Héloïse say, "Turn around". She turns and sees Héloïse in her wedding dress.

In the present, Marianne reveals that she saw Héloïse two more times. The first was in the form of a portrait at an art exhibition, in which Héloïse, with a child beside her, is portrayed holding a book and surreptitiously revealing the edge of page 28. The second time was at a concert in Milan, where she notices Héloïse among the patrons seated in the balcony across the theater from her. Unobserved, Marianne watches as Héloïse is overwhelmed by emotion while listening to the orchestra playing the Presto from "Summer" in Vivaldi's Four Seasons, music that Marianne had played for her on a harpsichord years before.

== Cast ==
- Noémie Merlant as Marianne
- Adèle Haenel as Héloïse
- Luàna Bajrami as Sophie
- Valeria Golino as The Countess
- Christel Baras as The Abortionist
- Armande Boulanger as The Painting Student

== Production ==
Principal photography began in October 2018 and was completed in 38 days. Filming took place in Saint-Pierre-Quiberon in Brittany and a château in La Chapelle-Gauthier, Seine-et-Marne. The film was produced by Lilies Films, Arte France Cinéma, and Hold Up Films.

The paintings and sketches in the film are by artist Hélène Delmaire. She painted for 16 hours every day during the course of filming, basing her painting on the blocking of the scenes. Her hands are also featured in the film. To mark the release of the film in France, Delmaire's paintings from Portrait of a Lady on Fire were exhibited at the Galerie Joseph in Paris from 20 to 22 September 2019.

== Soundtrack ==
Sciamma decided to do without a conventional score. Instead, the soundtrack consists of an original single, La Jeune Fille en Feu (lit. 'The Young Lady on Fire'), by composers Para One and Arthur Simonini. The song—performed by Sequenza 9.3, with Catherine Simonpiétri conducting—is scored for female choir a cappella and rhythmic clapping. According to Para One, although he and Simonini researched 18th-century music, they nonetheless recommended to Sciamma "a modern sound" inspired by György Ligeti's Requiem. Sciamma provided the lyrics: the (repeated) Latin phrase 'Non possunt fugere' and coda 'Nos resurgemus'—roughly translated as 'They cannot escape' and 'We rise', respectively.

In a review of the song for Slate, Matthew Dessum wrote, "The parsimonious use of music in the rest of the film makes the [singing of La Jeune Fille en Feu during the] bonfire scene completely overwhelming for characters and audience alike, so intense that it is almost unbearable. The music is beautiful, it is transporting, it is rapturous". Writing in Paste, Ellen Johnson concurred: "It's utterly shocking to hear the strange chant after more than an hour of almost no music at all, but that's what makes it so timely ... [it's] a skin-tingling experience."

The film features the third movement of "Summer" from Vivaldi's "The Four Seasons", performed by the Italian Baroque orchestra La Serenissima.

== Release ==
On 22 August 2018, film distributor mk2 began the sale of international rights to the film, with Pyramide Films acquiring the distribution rights for France. On 10 February 2019, Curzon Artificial Eye acquired the rights for the United Kingdom, Karma Films did so for Spain, Cinéart for Benelux, and Folkets Bio for Sweden. A few days after its premiere at Cannes, Neon and Hulu acquired North American distribution rights in a heated auction that also saw offers from Sony Pictures Classics and Netflix.

Portrait of a Lady on Fire was released in France on 18 September 2019. The film premiered theatrically in the United States as a limited release on 6 December 2019, followed by a wide release on 14 February 2020. It was released in the United Kingdom on 28 February 2020.

=== Home media ===
The DVD and Blu-ray was released in France by Pyramide Video on 18 February 2020, in Germany by Alamode Film (which would also be included in a limited-edition set box set alongside four other films by Sciamma), and in the UK by Curzon Artificial Eye on 8 June that same year. The film was released as VOD on Hulu on 27 March 2020. The DVD and Blu-ray in North America were released by The Criterion Collection on 23 June 2020. In Australia, though it did not release on Blu-ray, it was released on DVD by Madman Entertainment.

The cover for The Criterion Collection release is a painting by Hélène Delmaire.

== Influences ==
Céline Sciamma said she wanted "to make a romance film with a totally new story", adding, "there are a few films that are totally dedicated to love, so, often, those are biggest stories in cinema." Among her influences she cites Titanic, Mulholland Drive, Alfred Hitchcock, and Barry Lyndon for lighting with candles. She places the female gaze at the center of her film. She was also influenced by the character Ada in Jane Campion's 1993 film The Piano, who throws herself and her instrument into the water; in Sciamma's film, Marianne throws herself into the water to rescue painting materials that fall overboard. Sciamma said the start of Portrait of a Lady on Fire can be seen as a continuation of Campion's film.

== Reception ==
=== Critical response ===
Portrait of a Lady on Fire received broad acclaim. On review aggregator website Rotten Tomatoes, the film has an approval rating of 97% based on 341 reviews from critics, with an average rating of 9/10. The website's critical consensus reads, "A singularly rich period piece, Portrait of a Lady on Fire finds stirring, thought-provoking drama within a powerfully acted romance." On Metacritic, the film has a weighted average score of 95 out of 100, based on 48 critics, indicating "universal acclaim", and has been designated a Metacritic "Must See" movie. It is the second best reviewed film of 2019.

A. O. Scott of The New York Times wrote that Portrait of a Lady on Fire is a "subtle and thrilling love story, at once unsentimental in its realistic assessment of women's circumstances," calling Marianne and Héloïse's relationship, "less a chronicle of forbidden desire than an examination of how desire works," and, "the dangerous, irresistible power of looking." Mark Kermode from The Observer/The Guardian gave the film five stars and called it, "an intellectually erotic study of power and passion in which observed becomes observer, authored becomes author, returning time and again to a central question: 'If you look at me, who do I look at?'", and described the unwanted pregnancy subplot as "confronting but also depicting a taboo subject and its representation, refusing to look away, finding strength in sorority." For Variety, Peter Debruge wrote: "Though this gorgeous, slow-burn lesbian romance works strongly enough on a surface level, one can hardly ignore the fact, as true then as it is now, that the world looks different when seen through a woman's eyes," calling the film, "rigorously scripted" and Sciamma's approach "looking past surfaces in an attempt to capture deeper emotion."

For The New Yorker, Rachel Syme wrote that Portrait of a Lady on Fire thoroughly examines "the entanglements between artistic creation and burgeoning love, between memory and ambition and freedom. The film is about the erotic, electric connection between women when they find their desire for creative experience fulfilled in each other, but it is equally about the powers of art to validate, preserve, and console after a romance is over."

The film was voted the 30th greatest film of all time in the Sight and Sound Greatest Films of All Time 2022, the highest of films released in the 2010s. In 2025, the film ranked 38th on The New York Times's list of "The 100 Best Movies of the 21st Century" and 26th on the "Readers' Choice" edition of the list. Also in 2025, it ranked 82nd on Rolling Stone's list of "The 100 Best Movies of the 21st Century".

== Accolades ==
| Award | Date of ceremony | Category | Nominee(s) | Result | Ref |
|---|---|---|---|---|---|
| Cannes Film Festival | 25 May 2019 | Palme d'Or | Céline Sciamma | Nominated | |
| Cannes Film Festival | 25 May 2019 | Best Screenplay | Céline Sciamma | Won | |
| Cannes Film Festival | 25 May 2019 | Queer Palm | Céline Sciamma | Won | |
| British Independent Film Awards | 1 December 2019 | Best International Independent Film | Céline Sciamma, Véronique Cayla, Bénédicte Couvreur | Nominated | |
| Ljubljana LGBT Film Festival | 1 December 2019 | Pink Dragon Audience Award | Portrait of a Lady on Fire | Won | |
| European Film Awards | 7 December 2019 | Best Director | Céline Sciamma | Nominated | |
| European Film Awards | 7 December 2019 | Best Actress | Noémie Merlant | Nominated | |
| European Film Awards | 7 December 2019 | Best Actress | Adèle Haenel | Nominated | |
| European Film Awards | 7 December 2019 | Best Screenwriter | Céline Sciamma | Won | |
| European Film Awards | 7 December 2019 | European University Film Award | Portrait of a Lady on Fire | Won | |
| New York Film Critics Online | 7 December 2019 | Foreign Language | Portrait of a Lady on Fire | Won | |
| Los Angeles Film Critics Association | 8 December 2019 | Best Cinematography | Claire Mathon | Won | |
| Toronto Film Critics Association | 8 December 2019 | Best Foreign Language Film | Portrait of a Lady on Fire | Runner-up | |
| Washington D.C. Area Film Critics Association | 8 December 2019 | Best Foreign Language Film | Portrait of a Lady on Fire | Nominated | |
| Women Film Critics Circle | 9 December 2019 | Best Movie by a Woman | Céline Sciamma | Runner-up | |
| Women Film Critics Circle | 9 December 2019 | Best Woman Storyteller | Céline Sciamma | Runner-up | |
| Women Film Critics Circle | 9 December 2019 | Best Movie About Women | Portrait of a Lady on Fire | Won | |
| Women Film Critics Circle | 9 December 2019 | Best Foreign Film By or About Women | Portrait of a Lady on Fire | Won | |
| Women Film Critics Circle | 9 December 2019 | Karen Morley Award | Portrait of a Lady on Fire | Nominated | |
| Women Film Critics Circle | 9 December 2019 | Best Screen Couple | Noémie Merlant and Adèle Haenel (Note: Tied with Jennifer Lopez and Constance Wu for Hustlers.) | Won | |
| Chicago Film Critics Association | 14 December 2019 | Best Cinematography | Claire Mathon | Nominated | |
| Chicago Film Critics Association | 14 December 2019 | Best Costume Design | Portrait of a Lady on Fire | Nominated | |
| Chicago Film Critics Association | 14 December 2019 | Best Foreign Language Film | Portrait of a Lady on Fire | Nominated | |
| Dallas-Fort Worth Film Critics Association | 14 December 2019 | Best Foreign Language Film | Portrait of a Lady on Fire | 5th place | |
| Boston Society of Film Critics | 15 December 2019 | Best Picture | Portrait of a Lady on Fire | Runner-up | |
| Boston Society of Film Critics | 15 December 2019 | Best Foreign Language Film | Portrait of a Lady on Fire | Runner-up | |
| Boston Society of Film Critics | 15 December 2019 | Best Cinematography | Claire Mathon | Won | |
| St. Louis Film Critics Association | 15 December 2019 | Best Foreign Film | Portrait of a Lady on Fire | Nominated | |
| IndieWire Critics Poll | 16 December 2019 | Best Film | Portrait of a Lady on Fire | 5th place | |
| IndieWire Critics Poll | 16 December 2019 | Best Director | Céline Sciamma | 4th place | |
| IndieWire Critics Poll | 16 December 2019 | Best Screenplay | Portrait of a Lady on Fire | 10th place | |
| IndieWire Critics Poll | 16 December 2019 | Best Actress | Noémie Merlant | 13th place | |
| IndieWire Critics Poll | 16 December 2019 | Best Actress | Adèle Haenel | 10th place | |
| IndieWire Critics Poll | 16 December 2019 | Best Supporting Actress | Adèle Haenel | 13th place | |
| IndieWire Critics Poll | 16 December 2019 | Best Cinematography | Portrait of a Lady on Fire | 3rd place | |
| IndieWire Critics Poll | 16 December 2019 | Best Foreign Film | Portrait of a Lady on Fire | 3rd place | |
| San Francisco Bay Area Film Critics Circle | 16 December 2019 | Best Foreign Language Film | Portrait of a Lady on Fire | Nominated | |
| Seattle Film Critics Society | 16 December 2019 | Best Foreign Language Film | Portrait of a Lady on Fire | Nominated | |
| Seattle Film Critics Society | 16 December 2019 | Best Cinematography | Claire Mathon | Nominated | |
| Florida Film Critics Circle | 23 December 2019 | Best Picture | Portrait of a Lady on Fire | Won | |
| Florida Film Critics Circle | 23 December 2019 | Best Director | Céline Sciamma | Won | |
| Florida Film Critics Circle | 23 December 2019 | Best Original Screenplay | Céline Sciamma | Nominated | |
| Florida Film Critics Circle | 23 December 2019 | Best Cinematography | Claire Mathon | Runner-up | |
| Florida Film Critics Circle | 23 December 2019 | Best Foreign Language Film | Portrait of a Lady on Fire | Won | |
| National Society of Film Critics | 4 January 2020 | Best Cinematography | Claire Mathon | Won | |
| Golden Globe Awards | 5 January 2020 | Best Foreign Language Film | Portrait of a Lady on Fire | Nominated | |
| Austin Film Critics Association | 6 January 2020 | Best Supporting Actress | Adèle Haenel | Nominated | |
| Austin Film Critics Association | 6 January 2020 | Best Foreign-Language Film | Portrait of a Lady on Fire | Nominated | |
| Online Film Critics Society | 6 January 2020 | Best Picture | Portrait of a Lady on Fire | 6th place | |
| Online Film Critics Society | 6 January 2020 | Best Director | Céline Sciamma | Nominated | |
| Online Film Critics Society | 6 January 2020 | Best Cinematography | Claire Mathon | Nominated | |
| Online Film Critics Society | 6 January 2020 | Best Film Not in the English Language | Portrait of a Lady on Fire | Nominated | |
| New York Film Critics Circle Awards | 7 January 2020 | Best Cinematography | Claire Mathon | Won | |
| National Board of Review | 8 January 2020 | Top Five Foreign Language Films | Portrait of a Lady on Fire | Won | |
| Dorian Awards | 8 January 2020 | Film of the Year | Portrait of a Lady on Fire | Nominated | |
| Dorian Awards | 8 January 2020 | Director of the Year | Céline Sciamma | Nominated | |
| Dorian Awards | 8 January 2020 | LGBTQ Film of the Year | Portrait of a Lady on Fire | Won | |
| Dorian Awards | 8 January 2020 | Foreign Language Film of the Year | Portrait of a Lady on Fire | Nominated | |
| Dorian Awards | 8 January 2020 | Screenplay of the Year | Céline Sciamma | Nominated | |
| Dorian Awards | 8 January 2020 | Visually Striking Film of the Year | Portrait of a Lady on Fire | Nominated | |
| Georgia Film Critics Association | 10 January 2020 | Best Cinematography | Claire Mathon | Nominated | |
| Georgia Film Critics Association | 10 January 2020 | Best Foreign Language Film | Portrait of a Lady on Fire | Nominated | |
| Critics' Choice Awards | 12 January 2020 | Best Foreign Language Film | Portrait of a Lady on Fire | Nominated | |
| Lumière Awards | 27 January 2020 | Best Film | Portrait of a Lady on Fire | Nominated | |
| Lumière Awards | 27 January 2020 | Best Director | Céline Sciamma | Nominated | |
| Lumière Awards | 27 January 2020 | Best Actress | Noémie Merlant | Won | |
| Lumière Awards | 27 January 2020 | Best Cinematography | Claire Mathon | Won | |
| London Film Critics Circle | 30 January 2020 | Film of the Year | Portrait of a Lady on Fire | Nominated | |
| London Film Critics Circle | 30 January 2020 | Foreign-Language Film of the Year | Portrait of a Lady on Fire | Won | |
| British Academy Film Awards | 2 February 2020 | Best Film Not in the English Language | Portrait of a Lady on Fire | Nominated | |
| Satellite Awards | 7 February 2020 | Best Foreign Language Film | Portrait of a Lady on Fire | Nominated | |
| Film Independent Spirit Awards | 8 February 2020 | Best International Film | Céline Sciamma | Nominated | |
| César Awards | 28 February 2020 | Best Film | Bénédicte Couvreur and Céline Sciamma | Nominated | |
| César Awards | 28 February 2020 | Best Director | Céline Sciamma | Nominated | |
| César Awards | 28 February 2020 | Best Actress | Adèle Haenel | Nominated | |
| César Awards | 28 February 2020 | Best Actress | Noémie Merlant | Nominated | |
| César Awards | 28 February 2020 | Most Promising Actress | Luàna Bajrami | Nominated | |
| César Awards | 28 February 2020 | Best Original Screenplay | Céline Sciamma | Nominated | |
| César Awards | 28 February 2020 | Best Cinematography | Claire Mathon | Won | |
| César Awards | 28 February 2020 | Best Sound | Julien Sicart, Valérie de Loof and Daniel Sobrino | Nominated | |
| César Awards | 28 February 2020 | Best Costume Design | Dorothée Guiraud | Nominated | |
| César Awards | 28 February 2020 | Best Production Design | Thomas Grézaud | Nominated | |
| GLAAD Media Award | 19 March 2020 | Outstanding Film – Limited Release | Portrait of a Lady on Fire | Nominated | |
| Nastro d'Argento | 6 July 2020 | Best Supporting Actress | Valeria Golino | Won | |
| Dublin Film Critics' Circle | 18 December 2020 | Best Film | Portrait of a Lady on Fire | Won | |
| Robert Awards | 6 February 2021 | Best Non-English-language Feature | Portrait of a Lady on Fire | Won | |

== See also ==
- Jeanne-Philiberte Ledoux
- In the Loge
