= Bénédicte Couvreur =

French film producer

- Born: France
- Education: La Fémis
- Occupation: Film producer
- Notable work: Portrait of a Lady on Fire

Bénédicte Couvreur is a French film producer. She studied at the French cinema school, La Fémis. She is the founder of Lilies Films.

== Filmography ==
- Plus que deux (2002) (associate producer)
- Loup! (2002) (producer)
- Ni vue, ni connue (2003) (producer)
- Speculoos (2003) (producer)
- On est mort un million de fois (2005) (producer)
- Beyond Hatred (2005) (executive producer) a.k.a. Au delà de la haine (French title)
- Celebration (2006) (executive producer)
- La dérive des continents (2006) (TV) (producer)
- L'homme qui rêvait d'un enfant (2006) (producer)
- Water Lilies (2007) (producer) a.k.a. Naissance des pieuvres (French title)
- La part animale (2007) (producer)
- L'âge de l'amour (2007) (TV) (producer)
- P.O.V. (executive producer) (1 TV episode in 2009 : Beyond Hatred)
- Tomboy (2011) (producer)
- Parade (2013) (producer)
- Girlhood (2014) (producer)
- Portrait of a Lady on Fire (2019) (producer)
- Petite Maman (2021) (producer)
