= Water Lilies (film) =

2007 film

- French theatrical release poster
- Directed by: Céline Sciamma
- Written by: Céline Sciamma
- Produced by: Bénédicte Couvreur; Jérôme Dopffer
- Starring: Pauline Acquart; Louise Blachère; Adèle Haenel
- Cinematography: Crystel Fournier
- Edited by: Julien Lacheray
- Music by: Jean-Baptiste de Laubier (as Para One)
- Distributed by: Haut et Court
- Release dates: 17 May 2007 (Cannes); 15 August 2007 (France)
- Running time: 85 minutes
- Country: France
- Language: French
- Budget: €1.7 million
- Box office: $544,509

Water Lilies (French: Naissance des Pieuvres; meaning "Birth of the Octopuses") is a 2007 French drama film and the debut as a screenwriter and director of Céline Sciamma. It won the Louis Delluc Prize for Best First Film at the 2007 Cannes Film Festival.

== Plot ==
The film tracks the sexual awakenings of three 15-year-old girls, Marie, Anne and Floriane, in a middle-class suburb of Paris over the course of a single summer.

After observing a school synchronised swim competition, Marie becomes interested in Floriane, the team captain of The Stade Francais Swimmers. Marie's best friend, Anne, is also on a synchronised swimming team. Anne develops a crush on François after he walks in on her changing in the pool locker room. Marie expresses an interest in joining the team in order to become closer to Floriane, who the other girls regard as a "slut". Floriane and Marie make a deal; in return for helping her sneak out to meet François, Floriane will get Marie into the team meetings. As they spend more time together, Marie starts to see less of Anne.

Anne becomes resentful towards Marie for ignoring her. Marie tells Anne that she was spending time at her cousin's. Anne accepts this explanation. Floriane confesses to Marie that she has not yet had sex, despite her reputation. Floriane tells Marie that the rest of the girls on the team make up rumors because they do not like her and acts up to spite them. Floriane recounts instances of sexual harassment she has experienced at the hands of older men. When Floriane asks Marie if she has any similar stories to tell, Marie is quiet and Floriane tells her that she is lucky. After a swim practice, Marie feels affronted when she sees Floriane and François together in the locker room showers. Later, Floriane tells Marie that she is afraid of François discovering she is a virgin and giving in to sex.

Floriane and Marie visit a nightclub, where Floriane attempts to find an older man in order to lose her virginity. Floriane finds a man and kisses him in his car, but is interrupted by Marie. Floriane thanks Marie for the interruption, and later tells Marie that she wants Marie to be her "first", but Marie rejects her. Later that day, Marie meets Anne at a shopping mall, where Anne shoplifts a necklace. When the two eat lunch at McDonald's, Marie tells Anne that she is repulsed by Anne and her immature behavior and leaves. Anne enters the male swimming pool locker room and gives François the necklace, which he then gives to Floriane. Floriane tells Marie that François wants to see her that night when her parents are not at home. Marie accepts Floriane's request for her to be her "first", and uncomfortably fingers her in bed.

François and Anne later have sex at Anne's house, but François avoids kissing her. The next day, Anne tells Marie that Floriane did not have sex with François, and admits to never having been kissed. Marie kisses Anne, and tells Anne that she likes somebody. Anne assumes that Marie has a heterosexual crush. At a swimming team party, François attempts to have sex with Anne a second time but she spits in his mouth and leaves after he didn't kiss her again.

In the locker room, Marie and Floriane finally share a passionate kiss after Marie witnesses her flirt with another guy. Floriane walks out uninterested and Floriane tells Marie to 'save her' again if the guy turns out to be weird. Marie and Anne jump into the pool fully clothed, they float on their backs in the pool together, while Floriane dances alone at the party, oblivious to the effect that her actions have had upon Marie and Anne.

== Cast ==
- Pauline Acquart as Marie
- Louise Blachère as Anne
- Adèle Haenel as Floriane
- Warren Jacquin as François
- Alice de Lencquesaing as Girl in locker room
- Céline Sciamma as McDonalds attendant

== Production ==
The movie was mostly shot in Cergy.

Adèle Haenel wasn't doubled in her swimming scenes.

Director Céline Sciamma said she had no trouble persuading the three leading actresses to join, despite the intimate scenes in the film. "In the casting, I told each girl the whole scenario, including that scene in which one girl deflowers the other. You can't just say to a girl, 'if you're naked, that's your character.' No, it's her body. So I was always honest. I said that I would not betray them, that I would not take anything from them, that they should give me something. By itself. If they wanted to participate, they knew how far they had to go. I was surprised that they were immediately excited. But the story was really about them, they felt connected to it. And those parents were just as excited. They even helped me to lie to the government because I had given them a clean version of the script to convince them. The parents supported that story," Sciamma recalled.

== Reception ==
The film received generally positive reviews. Review aggregation website Rotten Tomatoes gives the film an 82% approval rating with an average score of 6.70/10 based on 49 reviews. The site's consensus is: "Water Lilies is a sharply-observed, provocative coming-of-age story that captures the anxieties of the early teen years." Metacritic gives the film an average score of 67%, based on 12 reviews, indicating "generally favorable reviews".

Tim Palmer discusses the film in the context of first-time, debutant filmmaking in France, which makes up around 40% of French cinema each year. As such, Sciamma's film is formally audacious (notably in its minimalism), self-referential (as in the director's cameo as a McDonald's clerk), and very engaged with intimate rites-of-passage, the socialization process rendered through a feminine sensibility.

=== Home media ===
Water Lilies was released on DVD in North America and Europe by Koch Lorber Films (a subsidiary of Entertainment One) in 2008. The DVDs are currently out-of-print. As of December 2019, the film was released on The Criterion Channel.

== Awards and nominations ==
The film was selected for screening in the section Un certain regard at the 2007 Cannes Film Festival, and won both the 2007 Prix de la jeunesse at Cabourg Film Festival and the 2007 Louis Delluc Prize for Best First Film.

The film secured three nominations for the 2008 César Awards; Céline Sciamma was nominated for the 2008 César Award for Best Debut, and actresses Adèle Haenel and Louise Blachère were both nominated for the 2008 César Award for Most Promising Actress.

== See also ==
- List of LGBT films directed by women
