= Para One =

French electronic music producer and film director

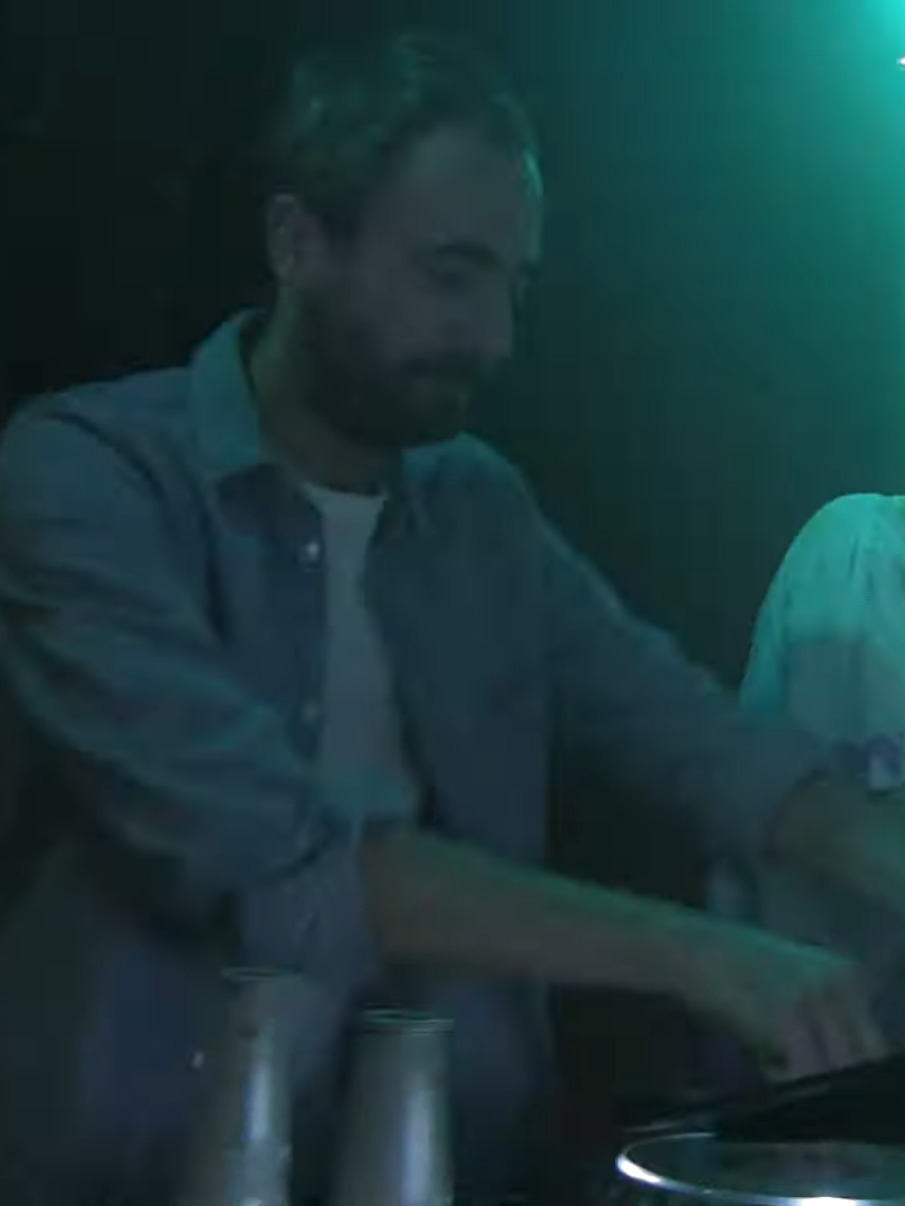
- Para One performing in 2016

Background information
- Born: Jean-Baptiste de Laubier; 2 April 1979 (age 47); Orléans, France
- Genres: Electronic
- Occupations: Producer, musician
- Instruments: Keyboards, turntable
- Years active: 2000–present
- Labels: Marble; Because; Ed Banger; Animal63; Spinnin'; Bromance
- Formerly of: TTC

Jean-Baptiste de Laubier (born 2 April 1979), known professionally as Para One, is a French electronic music producer and film director.

== Music career ==
Laubier first came to prominence as one of the main producers of French rap group TTC, and was responsible for producing their 2004 signature tune Dans Le Club. With fellow TTC producer Tacteel he made up the now defunct live/improvised electro outfit Fuck-A-Loop (whose only recorded material prior to 2007's nine-hour digital album The Early Aughties was a 2006 remix of Ellen Allien's Down). In 2006, he remixed The Prime Time of Your Life by French house duo Daft Punk. In 2008, Laubier's remix of Ayumi Hamasaki's Greatful Days was released on the album Ayu-mi-x 6: Gold.

Laubier has produced original music for the director Celine Sciamma's films Water Lilies (2007), Tomboy (2011), Girlhood (2014), and Portrait of a Lady on Fire (2019). Tomboy featured the song "Always" from Para One and Tacteel's Fair Enough EP.

== Film career ==
Apart from his musical career, Laubier has also worked as a film director. In 2009, he directed the short movie It Was on Earth That I Knew Joy for French brand Sixpack France. The movie was presented on February 20, 2010, at SCION Installation, Los Angeles.

== Discography ==
=== Albums ===
- Epiphanie (2006)
- Passion (2012)
- Club (2014)
- Spectre - Machines of Loving Grace (2021)

=== Soundtracks ===
- SPECTRE: Sanity, Madness & the Family (Original Motion Picture Soundtrack) (2021), soundtrack for the movie directed by Céline Sciamma
- Naissance des Pieuvres (2007), soundtrack for the movie Water Lilies, directed by Céline Sciamma
- Girlhood, la bande originale de Bande de Filles (2014), soundtrack for the movie Girlhood, directed by Céline Sciamma
- Portrait of a Lady on Fire (2019), soundtrack for the movie directed by Céline Sciamma

=== Singles ===
- Para One – Beat Down EP (2003)
- Paraone / Iris / Sept / Flynt / Lyricson (2003)
- Para One – Clubhoppn EP (2005)
- Para One – Dundun-Dun single (2006)
- Para One – Dundun-Dun - Remixes (2006)
- Para One – Epiphanie (2006)
- Para One – Midnight Swim (2007)
- Para One – Water Lilies OST (2007)
- Para One – Kiwi / Toadstool (2010)
- Para One – Animal Style / Nevrosis (2010)
- Das Glow & Para One – Pulsar / Freeze (2011)
- Para One & Tacteel – Fair Enough EP (2011)
- Para One & San Serac pres. Slice & Soda – Year of the Dragon (2011)
- Para One & Teki Latex – 5th Dimension (2011)
- Para One – Passion (2012)
- Para One – You Too (2014)

=== Remixes ===
- 2003 : Animal Machine - Persona
- 2003 : Agoria - Spinach Girl
- 2004 : Krazy Baldhead - Revolution
- 2005 : Stacs Of Stamina - Mistake, Rewind, Repeat
- 2005 : Billy Crawford - 3 Wishes (Remix paru en 2011, non trouvable dans le commerce)
- 2006 : Ellen Allien - Down (Fuckaloop remix)
- 2006 : Bloc Party - The Prayer
- 2006 : Daft Punk - The Prime Time Of Your Life
- 2006 : Mstrkrft - Work On You
- 2006 : Trabant - The One
- 2006 : Vegastar - Elle Blesse
- 2007 : Teki Latex - Disco Dance With You
- 2007 : Datarock - I Used To Dance With My Daddy
- 2007 : Boys Noize - My Head
- 2007 : Plaid - Kiddie Castle
- 2008 : Ayumi Hamasaki - Greatful Days
- 2008 : Guns 'n' Bombs - Riddle Of Steel
- 2009 : Tahiti Boy and the Palmtree Family - 1973
- 2009 : Boys Noize - Jeffer
- 2009 : Beethoven - 7e Symphonie : Allegretto
- 2009 : J.S. Bach - Ouverture de la Passion selon St Jean
- 2009 : W.A. Mozart - Offertoire du Requiem K626
- 2010 : Bart B More - Romane
- 2010 : Bot'Ox - Blue Steel (with Tacteel)
- 2010 : Depressed Buttons - Ow
- 2010 : Canblaster - Clockworks (avec Teki Latex)
- 2011 : Drop the Lime - Hot As Hell
- 2011 : Arnaud Fleurent-Didier - France Culture
- 2011 : Hey Today! - Minor
- 2011 : Jupiter - Saké (avec Tacteel)
- 2011 : Shake Aletti - Work (with Tacteel)
- 2011 : Noob - Powder (with Teki Latex)
- 2011 : Justice - Audio Video Disco
- 2012 : Surkin - Silver Island
- 2013 : LOGO - Cardiocleptomania
- 2015 : Dua Lipa - "New Love"

== Filmography ==
- Les Premières Communions (2004), short movie
- Cache Ta Joie (2005), short movie
- It Was on Earth That I Knew Joy (2009), short movie
