= Tomboy (2011 film) =

2011 film by Céline Sciamma

- Theatrical release poster
- Directed by: Céline Sciamma
- Screenplay by: Céline Sciamma
- Produced by: Bénédicte Couvreur
- Starring: Zoé Héran; Malonn Lévana; Sophie Cattani; Mathieu Demy; Jeanne Disson
- Cinematography: Crystel Fournier
- Edited by: Julien Lacheray
- Music by: Para One
- Production companies: Hold Up Films; Lilies Films; Arte France Cinéma
- Distributed by: Pyramide Distribution
- Release date: 20 April 2011
- Running time: 82 minutes
- Country: France
- Language: French
- Budget: $1 million
- Box office: $4.3 million

Tomboy is a 2011 French drama film written and directed by Céline Sciamma. The story follows a 10-year-old gender non-conforming child, who moves to a new neighborhood during the summer holiday and experiments with their gender presentation, adopting the name Mickaël. The film opened to positive reviews, with critics praising the directing and the performers, particularly Zoé Héran as the lead.

Tomboy was released on DVD-Video and Blu-ray in the United Kingdom on 5 March 2012, and in the United States on 5 June 2012.

== Plot ==
Laure is a 10-year-old girl whose family moves to a new address in Paris. Laure sees a group of boys playing outside the window and goes to play with them, but they disappear quickly. Instead, Laure meets Lisa, a neighborhood girl. Lisa assumes that Laure is a boy and asks for Laure's name. After a moment's thought, Laure comes up with the male name "Mickaël". Lisa then introduces Mickaël/Laure to the rest of the neighborhood children, stating that Mickaël is the new kid in the apartment complex. Mickaël becomes friends with Lisa and the boys, playing soccer with them. When invited to go swimming, Mickaël cuts a one-piece swimsuit into male swim briefs, and makes a clay penis to put inside.

Over time, Lisa and Mickaël become closer, and Lisa eventually kisses Mickaël. Mickaël also becomes increasingly accepted by the group of boys. One day while playing, Lisa makes up Mickaël's face and comments: "You look good as a girl." Mickaël goes home hiding her face under a hoodie, but Laure's mother says she likes it, encouraging her to be more feminine.

When Lisa comes by the apartment to look for Mickaël, she runs into Laure's precocious six-year-old sister Jeanne instead. The conversation makes Jeanne realize that Laure has been presenting as a boy. Jeanne confronts Laure and wants to tell their parents, but when Laure promises to take her along on all of Laure's outings for the rest of the summer, she quickly becomes happy to have a big brother, which she says is "way better" than having a big sister. She also helps cut Mickaël's hair to be more boyish, and promises to keep Mickaël's secret.

After Mickaël has a fight with one of the boys for pushing Jeanne, the boy and his mother come to Mickaël's door to tell Mickaël's mother about her son's bad behavior. Laure's mother is quick to understand and plays along, but after the visitors have left, she scolds Laure for "pretending to be a boy". Jeanne understands Laure's predicament and does her best to support her sibling emotionally. Laure's mother forces Laure to wear a dress and takes Laure to the apartment of the boy that Laure hit, and also to Lisa's apartment. Lisa is stunned to see Mickaël in a dress and runs off without a word.

Deeply embarrassed, Laure goes to the woods. After a time there, Laure takes off the blue dress, leaving on a tank top and boy-style shorts. Walking away from the discarded dress, Mickaël sees the other children in the distance. Mickaël can hear them talking, speculating about whether Mickaël is a girl or not. When they spot Mickaël, the boys chase and capture Mickaël and say they're going to see if Mickaël's really a girl. Lisa stands up to them and tells them to leave Mickaël alone. But when they tell Lisa: "You kissed him. If it's a girl, that's disgusting, isn't it?" Lisa agrees and reluctantly looks in Mickaël's shorts, with Mickaël in tears but letting her. Lisa is shocked. The boys and Lisa leave while Mickaël remains in the woods, devastated.

Later, it is seen that Laure's mother has given birth to a baby boy. The family spend time together at home, with Laure not wanting to go outside. However, Laure sees Lisa waiting outside the window, and goes out to see her. After a long silence, Lisa quietly asks for Laure's name. "My name is Laure", Laure responds, and smiles a little.

== Cast ==
- Zoé Héran as Laure/Mickaël
- Malonn Lévana as Jeanne, Laure's sister
- Jeanne Disson as Lisa
- Sophie Cattani as Laure's mother
- Mathieu Demy as Laure's father

== Interpretations ==
The film has been described as being about a girl who pretends to be a boy or, alternatively, about a transgender boy. Film critic Roger Ebert said "If you think you're looking at a boy, you see one. If a girl, then that's what you see."

Céline Sciamma, the writer and director, said "I made it with several layers, so that a transexual person can say 'that was my childhood' and so that a heterosexual woman can also say it." She also said the "movie is ambiguous about Mickaël's feelings for Lisa. It plays with the confusion."

Zoé Héran knew from the script that she would have to appear naked in one brief shot, as her character gets out of the bathtub; her parents were present at the time of filming.

== Reception ==
Tomboy earned positive reviews. Earning 96% on Rotten Tomatoes with a consensus saying, "In tune with the emotion and tribulations of childhood, Tomboy is a charming movie that treats its main subject with warmth and heart." Roger Ebert of the Chicago Sun-Times gave three and a half out of four, commenting that Tomboy is "tender and affectionate". In 2017, it was ranked by IndieWire as "the third best lesbian movie of all time". Autostraddle called it "excellent".

=== Awards ===
- Jury Award at the 2011 Teddy Awards, given for the best film with LGBT themes at the Berlin film festival.
- Golden Duke, the main prize of the official competition of the 2011 Odesa International Film Festival.
- Audience Award at the 2011 San Francisco Frameline Gay & Lesbian Film Festival.
- Best Feature Film at the 2011 Philadelphia QFest Lesbian and Gay Film Festival.
- Competition at the 2011 Torino Lesbian and Gay Film Festival.
- Nominated for the GLAAD Media Award as Outstanding Film — Limited Release.
- Héran won the Jury Award for Best Performance at the 2011 NewFest Film Festival.
- Héran was nominated for the Young Artist Award as Best Leading Young Performer in an International Feature Film.
- Prix Jacques Prévert du Scénario for Best Original Screenplay in 2012

== See also ==
- List of LGBT films directed by women
- Childhood gender nonconformity
