= Girlhood (film) =

2014 film by Céline Sciamma

- Theatrical release poster
- French: Bande de filles
- Directed by: Céline Sciamma
- Written by: Céline Sciamma
- Produced by: Bénédicte Couvreur
- Starring: Karidja Touré; Assa Sylla; Lindsay Karamoh; Mariétou Touré
- Cinematography: Crystel Fournier
- Edited by: Julien Lacheray
- Music by: Para One
- Production companies: Hold Up Films; Lilies Films; Arte France Cinéma
- Distributed by: Pyramide Distribution
- Release dates: 15 May 2014 (Cannes); 22 October 2014 (France)
- Running time: 113 minutes
- Country: France
- Language: French
- Box office: $1.7 million

Girlhood (French: Bande de filles, lit. 'Group of Girls') is a 2014 French coming-of-age drama film written and directed by Céline Sciamma. The plot focuses on the life of Marieme (Karidja Touré), a teenage girl who lives in a rough neighbourhood on the outskirts of Paris. The film discusses and challenges conceptions of race, gender and class; Sciamma's goal was to capture the stories of Black teenagers, characters she claims are generally underdeveloped in French films.

It was screened as part of the Directors' Fortnight section of the 2014 Cannes Film Festival. It was also screened in the Contemporary World Cinema section at the 2014 Toronto International Film Festival. It received four nominations at the 40th César Awards, including Best Director for Céline Sciamma and Most Promising Actress for Karidja Touré.

== Plot ==
Marieme (Karidja Touré) is a 16-year-old African-French teenager living in a poor Paris suburb. Marieme struggles academically, which forces her into a vocational track where she will learn a trade. Due to her mother's long working hours, Marieme's abusive older brother Djibril is effectively in charge of the household, while Marieme also cares for their two younger sisters, Bebe and Mini.

On her way out of school, the day she found out about vocational school, she is approached by a gang of girls. Lady (Assa Sylla) who is the leader of the group, and her followers, Fily (Marietou Toure), and Adiatou (Lindsay Karamoh), ask Marieme if she wants to join them for a day in the city centre. They wear leather jackets, gold jewelry, and have pin straight hair. Marieme initially declines but, after seeing the girls approached by a group of boys, including her brother's friend, Ismaël (Idrissa Diabate) whom she has a crush on, Marieme joins them.

The girls fight, intimidate and steal from others, but love and support each other. Marieme and the girls grow close and she begins to act and dress just like them. After stealing money, the girls pay for a hotel room, steal dresses, drink alcohol, do drugs, lip sync to "Diamonds" by Rihanna, and dance all night long. At the hotel, Lady encourages Marieme to ignore Djibril's phone calls and gives her a gold necklace with the name Vic for Victory.

Lady sets up a fight with a girl in a rival group. The girl beats her, tearing off her shirt and exposing her bra, which is viewed as a disgrace. Due to her loss, her father cuts her hair off and makes her keep her distance from the group. Vic/Marieme wants to prove to herself, as well as Lady, that she has the strength to beat their rival. Vic wins the battle by ripping the girl's shirt off and cutting her bra, leaving her topless. Both Lady and Djibril express their pride in her. Later that day, she has sex with Ismaël for the first time.

Djibril assaults her when he finds out she slept with Ismaël, so she leaves home and her friends behind to work for Abou, a local drug dealer. Vic lives in an apartment with Monica, a prostitute also working for Abou, and sells drugs in a gang of young men. She wears dresses, makeup and a blonde wig while selling at parties, but otherwise binds her breasts and wears loose baggy clothing. When Ismaël discovers she has been binding her breasts, they argue.

Afterwards, Vic goes to a party at Abou's place where she shares a tender moment dancing with Monica. Abou approaches and tries to kiss her, but she tells him no and pushes him away. Vic goes to Ismaël's place to tell him she's done with Abou and he offers to let her stay at his place and marry her. Vic refuses, telling him she doesn't want that kind of life. She attempts to go back home, but when she is buzzed in, she cannot bring herself to enter. Vic cries for a moment, regains her resolve and, with a determined look on her face, walks away.

== Cast ==
- Karidja Touré as Marieme "Vic"
- Assa Sylla as Sophie "Lady"
- Lindsay Karamoh as Adiatou
- Mariétou Touré as Fily
- Idrissa Diabaté as Ismaël
- Simina Soumare as Bébé
- Dielika Coulibaly as Monica
- Cyril Mendy as Djibril
- Djibril Gueye as Abou
- Binta Diop as Asma
- Chance N'Guessan as Mini
- Rabah Nait Oufella as Kader
- Damien Chapelle as Cédric
- Nina Melo as Caidy
- Elyes Sabyani as Abdel
- Halem El Sabagh as Farida
- Theo Monksfield as Cédric

== Production ==
Sciamma's inspiration for the film came from the different gangs of girls she saw around Paris, especially around the Les Halles shopping center and the Métro. Her goal was to focus on friendship, sorority, and the special bond that is formed between girls. Sciamma is frequently asked why she wrote and directed a film about a gang of young French black girls, seeing that she is white. Celine stated, "I had a strong sense of having lived on the outskirts – even if I am middle-class white girl. I didn't feel I was making the film about black women but with black women – it's not the same. I'm not saying, 'I'm going to tell you what it's like being black in France today'; I just want to give a face to the French youth I'm looking at."

The film's casting process took four months to complete where actresses were scouted from the streets of Paris.

Sciamma intentionally cast black actresses because of her concern over the lack of opportunities for black women in France, saying that she "was shocked by how black people were never on screen [in France]. Very, very few – even in TV. Particularly that age group and women. There are no black actresses famous in France."

The film also made prominent use of the song "Diamonds" by Rihanna. Sciamma shot the scene before securing the rights to the song and had to appeal to Rihanna's management in post-production. After seeing the scene, they agreed to grant her the rights to the usage of the song for a minimal fee.

== Reception ==
The film received highly positive reviews from critics. On review aggregator website Rotten Tomatoes, the film holds an approval rating of 96% based on 79 reviews, with an average rating of 8.1/10. The site's critics consensus reads: "Powerfully acted and smartly scripted, Girlhood offers a fresh perspective on familiar cinematic territory." On Metacritic, the film has a weighted average score of 85 out of 100, based on 22 critics, indicating "universal acclaim".

The Guardian described the film as "a work of cinematic art." In his review for the San Francisco Chronicle, Mick LaSalle wrote, "Girlhood is about as grim as movies get, but it's showing something real, and Sciamma has a feel for this period of life, the camaraderie, the jokes, the kinds of conflicts, the panic and the hope. Each time Sciamma makes a movie, it's as if she's saying, not stridently, but plainly, 'Here's something real people are going through that you've never thought about.' That's a moral use of film, all the more effective in that Sciamma makes Girlhood entertaining."

Sciamma received both criticism and praise for her decision to use an all-black cast of girls.

A. O. Scott of The New York Times commended Girlhood for maintaining the focus on a young woman in an absent society where she is fierce, independent, gentle and intelligent in order to survive what comes ahead. Scott focused on the conflict between the conscious Marieme developing towards the fearless Vic and how she combats the stereotypes of what a young woman in her situation is expected to become by transforming her experiences into a future she now controls.

=== Accolades ===
Award / Film Festival	Category	Recipients and nominees	Result
British Independent Film Award	Best Foreign Independent Film	Girlhood	Nominated
César Awards	Best Director	Céline Sciamma	Nominated
César Awards	Most Promising Actress	Karidja Touré	Nominated
César Awards	Best Sound	Pierre André and Daniel Sobrino	Nominated
César Awards	Best Music Written for a Film	Jean-Baptiste de Laubier	Nominated
European Parliament Lux Prize	—N/a	Girlhood	Nominated
Lumière Awards	Best Film	Girlhood	Nominated
Lumière Awards	Best Director	Céline Sciamma	Nominated
Lumière Awards	Best Female Revelation	Karidja Touré	Nominated
Lumière Awards	Special Jury Prize	Girlhood	Won
Philadelphia Film Festival	Special Jury Prize	Girlhood	Won
San Sebastián International Film Festival	TVE Another Look Award	Girlhood	Won
Stockholm International Film Festival	Bronze Horse for Best Film	Girlhood	Won
Stockholm International Film Festival	Best Cinematography	Crystel Fournier	Won
UK Film Festival	Best Feature Film	Girlhood	Nominated

== See also ==
- List of LGBT films directed by women
- List of black films of the 2010s
- List of hood films
