= Lee Shipman =

American television writer, producer, and showrunner

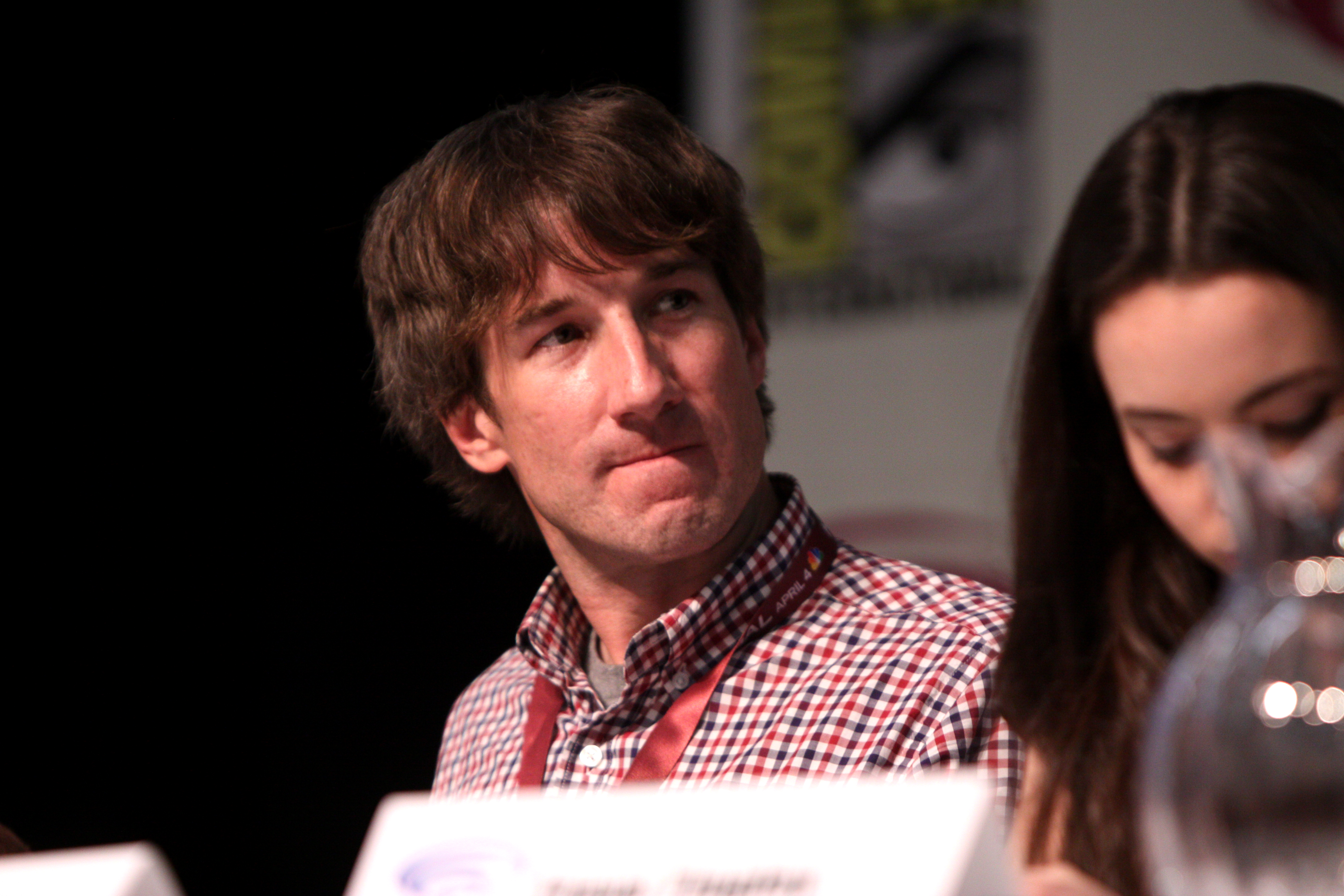
- Shipman at WonderCon 2013
- Born: Corpus Christi, Texas, U.S.
- Education: The University of Texas
- Occupations: Screenwriter; Producer
- Children: 2
- Writing career
- Period: 2013–present

Lee Shipman is an American television writer, producer, and showrunner. He is best known for his work on the Netflix horror drama Hemlock Grove and the AMC Western drama series The Son.

== Career ==
Shipman served as co-creator and executive producer on Hemlock Grove, a horror-drama series developed for Netflix. The series was based on the novel by fellow co-creator Brian McGreevy and directed by Eli Roth. The series premiered in 2013, running for three seasons. In a review for Collider, Allison Keene wrote, "Put it in the category of 'guilty pleasure.' And, actually, it manages to have a little something for everyone, even those who aren't horror genre fans."

Shipman later co-created The Son, an AMC series adapted from the novel by Philipp Meyer. Shipman served as co-creator, executive producer, and writer on the series, which starred Pierce Brosnan and aired from 2017 to 2019. In a review for Vulture, Jen Chaney called The Son "a handsomely shot, well-acted, and respectable piece of work."

Shipman served as an executive producer on the television series American Rust, based on the novel by Philipp Meyer. The series ran for two seasons and starred Jeff Daniels.

In 2019, Shipman was attached to write the musical drama Moss Landing for Lee Daniels and the country music duo Florida Georgia Line for ABC. The Deadline article announcing the project described it as such: "Moss Landing, set in a small Florida coastal town, follows Marion James, a disgraced country star, and Sky Miller, an African-American gospel and soul singer in a sweeping love story."

== Filmography ==
=== Television ===
- Hemlock Grove (2013–2015) – Co-creator, executive producer, writer
- The Son (2017–2019) – Co-creator, executive producer, writer
- American Rust (2021–2024) – Executive producer
