= 2014 Deauville American Film Festival =

- Festival poster
- Opening film: Magic in the Moonlight
- Closing film: Sin City: A Dame to Kill For
- Location: Deauville, France
- Hosted by: Deauville American Film Festival Group
- No. of films: 68 feature films
- Festival date: September 5, 2014–September 14, 2014
- Language: International
- Website: www.festival-deauville.com

The 40th Deauville American Film Festival took place at Deauville, France from September 5 to 14, 2014. Woody Allen's romantic comedy film Magic in the Moonlight served as the opening night film. Sin City: A Dame to Kill For by Robert Rodriguez and Frank Miller was the closing night film of the festival. The Grand Prix was awarded to Whiplash by Damien Chazelle, which also won the Audience award at the festival.

The festival paid tribute to James Cameron, Robin Williams, Lauren Bacall, Jessica Chastain, Will Ferrell, Brian Grazer, Ray Liotta, and John McTiernan and host retrospective of their films. In addition James Cameron also screened his film Deepsea Challenge 3D and received special honour as an award called 40th Anniversary Award. The festival honoured Russian-born American film and stage actor Yul Brynner with Deauville Legend award.

== Juries ==
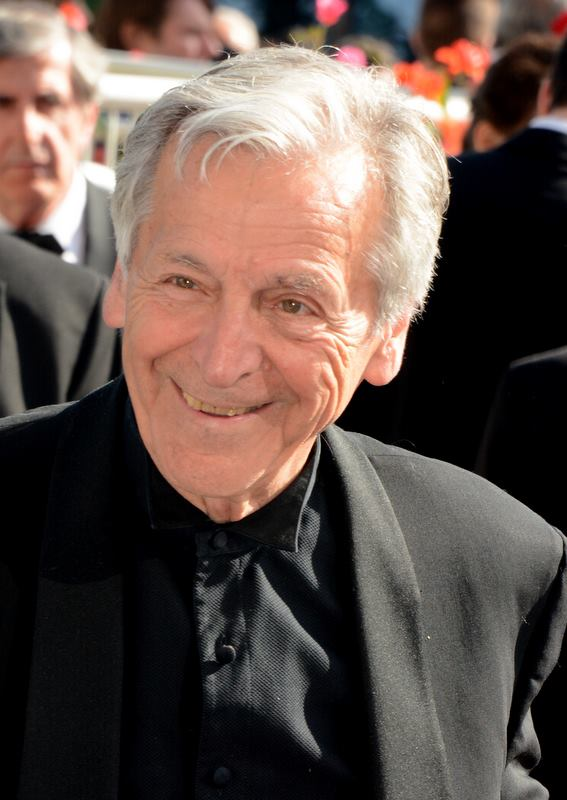
Costa-Gavras, Main Jury President

=== Main Competition ===
- Costa-Gavras: Greek-French director and producer (President of Jury)
- Jean-Pierre Jeunet: French screenwriter and director
- Claude Lelouch: French director, writer, cinematographer
- Pierre Lescure: French journalist and television executive
- Vincent Lindon: French actor and filmmaker
- Marie-Claude Pietragalla: French dancer and choreographer
- André Téchiné: French screenwriter and director

=== Cartier revelation jury ===
- Audrey Dana: French actress and director (President of Jury)
- Anne Berest: French novelist and screenwriter
- Lola Bessis: French screenwriter
- Christine and the Queens: French singer and songwriter
- Freddie Highmore: English actor
- Clémence Poésy: French actress and fashion model

== Programme ==
=== Competition ===
- A Girl Walks Home Alone at Night by Ana Lily Amirpour
- After the Fall by Saar Klein
- I Origins by Mike Cahill
- It Follows by David Robert Mitchell
- Jamie Marks Is Dead by Carter Smith
- Cold in July by Jim Mickle
- Love Is Strange by Ira Sachs
- The Better Angels by A.J. Edwards
- The Good Lie by Philippe Falardeau
- A Most Wanted Man by Anton Corbijn
- Uncertain Terms by Nathan Silver
- War Story by Mark Jackson
- Whiplash by Damien Chazelle
- White Bird in a Blizzard by Gregg Araki

=== Les Premières (Premieres) ===
- Alex of Venice by Chris Messina
- Anchorman 2: The Legend Continues by Adam McKay
- Before I Go to Sleep by Rowan Joffé
- Camp X-Ray by Peter Sattler
- Chef by Jon Favreau
- Deepsea Challenge 3D by John Bruno, Ray Quint and Andrew Wight
- Get on Up by Tate Taylor
- Infinitely Polar Bear by Maya Forbes
- Land Ho! by Martha Stephens and Aaron Katz
- Magic in the Moonlight by Woody Allen
- The November Man by Roger Donaldson
- Sin City: A Dame to Kill For by Robert Rodriguez and Frank Miller
- The Boxtrolls by Anthony Stacchi and Graham Annable
- The Hundred-Foot Journey by Lasse Hallström
- The Disappearance of Eleanor Rigby: Them by Ned Benson

=== Les Docs De L'Oncle Sam (Uncle Sam's Doc) ===
- Last Days in Vietnam by Rory Kennedy
- Life Itself by Steve James
- National Gallery by Frederick Wiseman
- Red Army by Gabe Polsky
- The Go-Go Boys: The Inside Story of Cannon Films by Hilla Medalia

=== La Nuit américaine (American cinema overview) ===
- All Is Lost by J. C. Chandor
- Beasts of the Southern Wild by Benh Zeitlin
- Being John Malkovich by Spike Jonze
- Crash by Paul Haggis
- Ghost World by Terry Zwigoff
- Hedwig and the Angry Inch by John Cameron Mitchell
- High Art by Lisa Cholodenko
- In the Company of Men by Neil LaBute
- Les Misérables by Tom Hooper
- Little Miss Sunshine by Jonathan Dayton and Valerie Faris
- Living in Oblivion by Tom DiCillo
- The Long Way Home by Mark Jonathan Harris
- Mamma Mia! by Phyllida Lloyd
- Maria Full of Grace by Joshua Marston
- Memento by Christopher Nolan
- Precious by Lee Daniels
- Ray by Taylor Hackford
- Sin Nombre by Cary Fukunaga
- Take Shelter by Jeff Nichols
- The Blues Brothers by John Landis
- The Dead Girl by Karen Moncrieff
- The Visitor by Tom McCarthy
- Thirteen by Catherine Hardwicke
- Welcome to the Dollhouse by Todd Solondz
- Winter's Bone by Debra Granik

=== Deauville Se Souvient ===
- Good Morning, Vietnam by Barry Levinson
- Key Largo by John Huston
- Dead Poets Society by Peter Weir
- The Big Sleep by Howard Hawks
- To Have and Have Not by Howard Hawks
- Good Will Hunting by Gus Van Sant

=== Hommage Deauville Legend (Tribute Deauville Legend) ===
- The Magnificent Seven by John Sturges
- The Ten Commandments by Cecil B. DeMille
- Westworld by Michael Crichton

=== Television ===
- The Strain by Guillermo del Toro and Chuck Hogan

== Awards ==
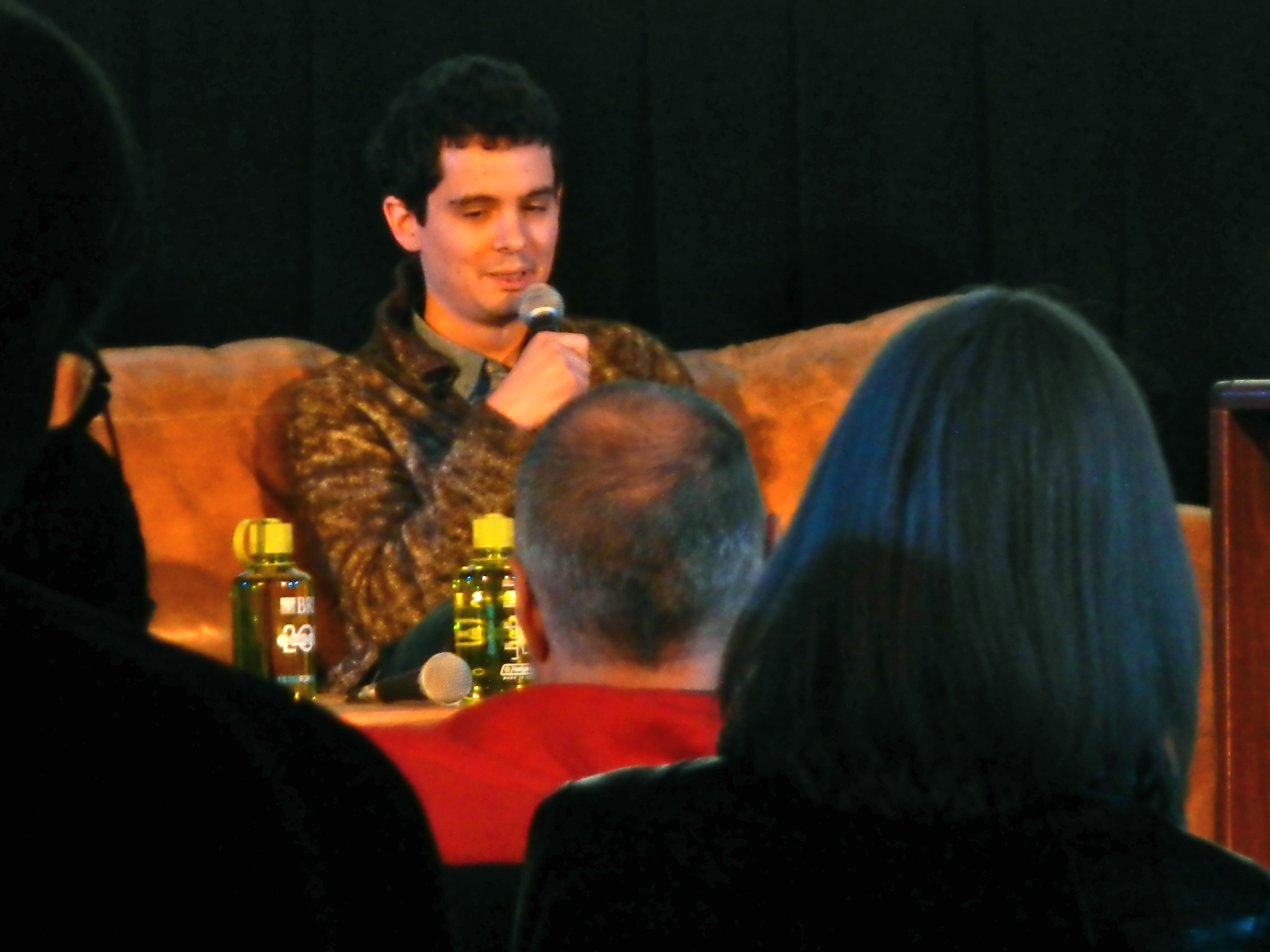
Damien Chazelle, won Grand Prix and Audience award at the festival.

The festival awarded the following awards:

- Grand Prix (Grand Special Prize): Whiplash by Damien Chazelle
- Prix du Jury (Jury Special Prize): The Good Lie by Philippe Falardeau
- Prix du Public (Audience Award): Whiplash by Damien Chazelle
- Prix de la Critique Internationale (International Critics' prize): It Follows by David Robert Mitchell
- Prix Michel d'Ornano (Michel d'Ornano Award for debut French film): Elle l'adore by Jeanne Herry
- Prix de la Révélation Cartier (Cartier Revelation Prize): A Girl Walks Home Alone at Night by Ana Lily Amirpour
- Prix du 40e (40th Anniversary Award): After the Fall by Saar Klein
- Lucien Barrière Prize for Literature:
  - The Son by Philipp Meyer
- Tributes:
  - James Cameron
  - Robin Williams
  - Lauren Bacall
  - Jessica Chastain
  - Will Ferrell
  - Brian Grazer
  - Ray Liotta
  - John McTiernan
- Deauville Legend:
  - Yul Brynner
