= Mark Pellegrino =

American actor (born 1965)

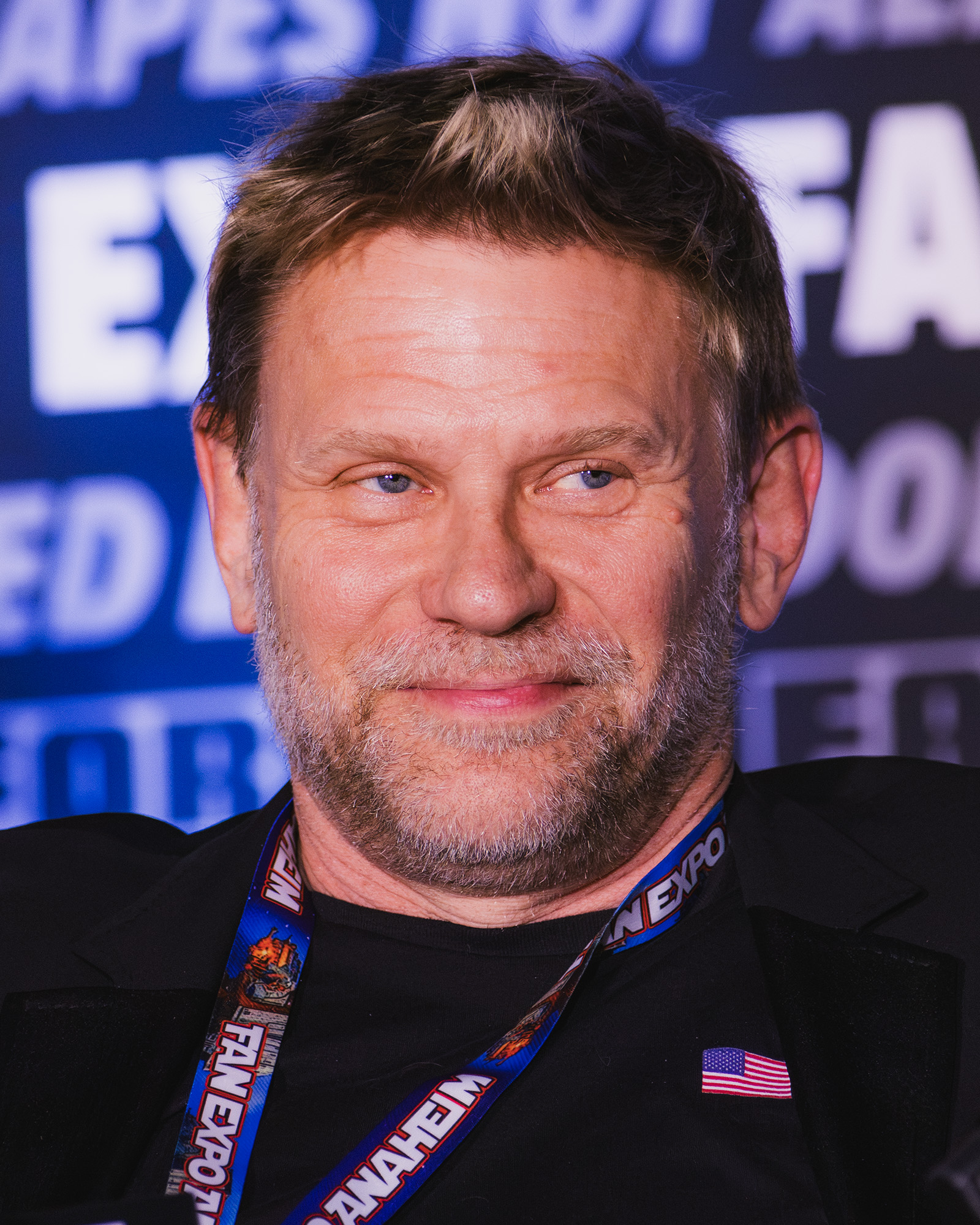
- Pellegrino in 2026
- Born: Mark Ross Pellegrino; April 9, 1965 (age 61); Pasadena, California, U.S.
- Occupation: Actor
- Years active: 1987–present
- Notable work: 13 Reasons Why; American Rust; Being Human; Dexter; Far Cry 5 Lost; Mulholland Drive; Quantico; Supernatural; The Closer; The Returned; The Tomorrow People
- Height: 6 ft 3 in (191 cm)
- Spouse: Tracy Pellegrino (m. 2008)
- Children: 2 stepchildren

Mark Ross Pellegrino (born April 9, 1965) is an American actor. He is best known for his work as Lucifer in Supernatural, Paul Bennett in Dexter, Jacob in Lost, James Bishop in Being Human, Clayton Haas in Quantico, Joe Messing in Mulholland Drive, and Deputy Bill Standall in 13 Reasons Why.

== Early life, family and education ==
Mark Pellegrino was born in Pasadena, California, and grew up in Van Nuys, California. He attended Notre Dame High School. When he was in high school, he co-founded and sang in a heavy metal band, XL. It disbanded after school was finished.

Although he enrolled in college and achieved straight As, he dropped out after a year. He saw an advertisement for a modeling agency at a place called John Roberts Powers, where he received some free training. During his training he was picked out for talent by commercial agent Bob Hoover. He was set up with an agent and acting coaches. From there he was sent out into the world of acting and discovered the Meisner acting method. He had no dream to become an actor at the time.

For most of his life, Mark believed Bill Pellegrino (whom his mother divorced when he was two years old) was his biological father. As an adult, Mark ran a search on ancestry.com to learn more about his heritage. He discovered his DNA did not indicate Italian ancestry. Before the COVID-19 pandemic, he asked fans of TV show Supernatural on Twitter (now named X) if they would be interested in finding his real father. Within an hour of posting, his father was found along with the knowledge of having two sisters and three brothers. His biological father, Gerry, is of German descent.

== Career ==
Pellegrino's first appearance into television was on season 2, episode 2 of the series L.A. Law. His debut film role was that of a narcotics dealer in 1987's Fatal Beauty. Some of his earlier television appearances are also in Northern Exposure, Tales from the Crypt, ER, Without a Trace, NYPD Blue, CSI: Crime Scene Investigation, Hunter, and The Commish.

In 1989, he portrayed Hulk Hogan's younger brother in No Holds Barred.

In 1991, he co-starred in Prayer of the Rollerboys as Christopher Collet's aide-de-camp.

In 1998, he played the Blonde Treehorn Thug who stuffs The Dude's head down the toilet and drops his bowling ball, breaking the floor tile, in the cult film The Big Lebowski.

In 1999, he appeared in season 7, episode 3 of The X-Files as a disgruntled fast food joint employee. He was featured in National Treasure as the background FBI agent known as Agent Johnson.

In 2001, he played a hitman in David Lynch's critically acclaimed Mulholland Drive. He portrayed terrorist bomber Bobby James on The Beast.

In 2005, he appeared in the Academy Award winning film Capote, playing murderer Dick Hickock.

In 2006, he played Sadik Marku, an Albanian mob boss, in two episodes of Without a Trace. The first episode was in season 4, episode 22 where he guest starred alongside Mark Sheppard who played Crowley in Supernatural. The second episode was in season 5, episode 5 where he guest starred alongside Rachel Miner who played Meg Masters also which is a role in Supernatural.

In March 2009, he was cast on the ABC series Lost for an appearance in the final 2 episodes of Season 5, to play the role of the mysterious Jacob. Although the press release for the episode refers to his character simply as man No. 1, the episode revealed that he portrayed Jacob, a mysterious character pivotal to the show's plot.

On June 26, 2009, it was also announced that he was cast in a recurring role as Lucifer in season 5 of the CW series Supernatural. He played a recurring role as Lucifer in season 7, and a main role as his character in seasons 12 and 13. He played a main role in season 14 as Nick, Lucifer's vessel, and was a special guest in season 15.

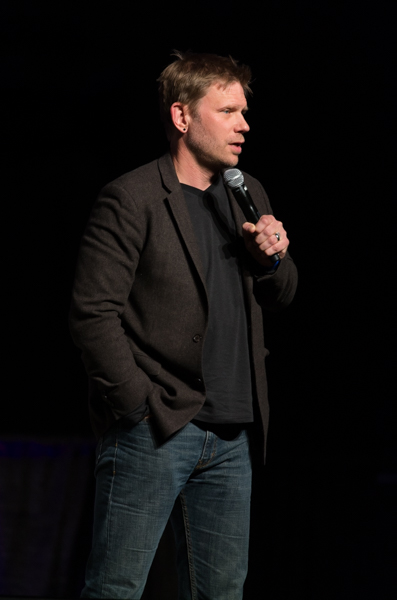
Mark Pellegrino at Calgary Expo 2015

In 2011 he portrayed James Bishop, the leader of a vampire clan based in Boston, in the SyFy horror series Being Human in the first season, and reprised his role in seasons 2-4 as a recurring guest.

In 2011, he and Curtis Armstrong, who played Metatron on Supernatural, guest starred alongside each other as well as their characters being enemy lawyers in season 7 of The Closer.

In 2012, he played a man that took a hit out on his wife, who also took one out on him, Daniel Drake in season 2, episode 8 of Person of Interest.

In 2015, he joined the ABC thriller series Quantico playing the recurring role of Clayton Haas.

In 2018, he voiced and motion captured his first video game role as antagonist Jacob Seed in one Ubisoft's Far Cry 5.

In 2021 and 2024, he played Virgil Poe in the American Rust TV series, a show based on the novel of the same name written by Philipp Meyer.

In July 2024, he appeared in Beverly Hills Cop: Axel F as one of Captain Cade Grant's, played by Kevin Bacon, main man antagonist named Beck.

== Views ==
Pellegrino is an atheist. He is a follower of Objectivism, a philosophy created by Russian-American writer Ayn Rand. Before that he used to be an environmentalist and a registered Democrat. Two of the ways he spreads Rand's views are through two YouTube platforms. The first one is through an affiliation with the Ayn Rand Centre UK, and the second is to his own account with a series he has created called: Reality Checks, which are videos of ideas based on philosophical topics of everyday life.

In 2014, Pellegrino described himself as a classical liberal. He is a co-founder of the American Capitalist Party. The party stands for individual rights, limited constitutional government, and laissez-faire capitalism.

Pellegrino is a supporter of Israel. He expressed support for Israel during the 2014 Gaza War. In January 2017, he took a government-sponsored trip to Israel, together with actors Daniel Dae Kim, Meagan Good, Sonequa Martin-Green and Kenric Green, as part of an effort to combat the Boycott, Divestment and Sanctions (BDS) movement. In 2024, Pellegrino signed an open letter denouncing Jonathan Glazer's Oscars acceptance speech for The Zone of Interest, in which he criticized the dehumanization of victims of the ongoing Gaza genocide. In April 2025, fact-checking organization FakeReporter reported that Pellegrino was one of 30 prominent Twitter accounts promoting content from Gazawood, an Israeli Twitter account which attempts to discredit Palestinians by claiming they are exaggerating or faking their casualties.

== Personal life ==
Pellegrino is married to Tracy Pellegrino, a director and acting coach. They split their time between Paris and Los Angeles. He sometimes teaches at Playhouse Paris, a Meisner training school his wife owns and runs in Paris, France. He has stated that his favorite thing to do in the world is to teach, and that his alternative choice of career would be to teach history.

== Filmography ==
Key
†	Denotes works that have not yet been released

=== Film ===
Year	Title	Role	Notes
1987	Fatal Beauty	Frankenstein	
1987	Death Wish 4: The Crackdown	Punk	
1989	No Holds Barred	Randy Thomas	
1989	Night Life	Allen Patumbo	
1990	Prayer of the Rollerboys	Bango	
1991	Blood and Concrete / Blood & Concrete: A Love Story	Bartholomew "Bart" Daniels	
1991	Inside Out	Jack	Segment "Doubletalk" - misspelled name as "Mark Pelligrino"
1992	Lethal Weapon 3	Billy Phelps	
1992	Mission of Justice	The Gauntlet Fighter	
1993	Trouble Bound	Deputy Roy	
1993	Midnight Witness	Robert "Robbie/Rob" Patterson	
1993	Bank Robber	Motorcycle Cop Ted	
1994	F.T.W	Deputy Jimmy Sommers	
1996	For Life or Death / Soul of the Avenger	Earl Stockman	Misspelled name as "Mark Pelligrino"
1997	The Lost World: Jurassic Park	Tourist #6	Deleted scene
1997	Movies Kill		
1997	The Temple of Phenomenal Things	Dodd	
1997	Macon County Jail	Dan Oldum	
1998	The Big Lebowski	Blonde Treehorn Thug #2	
1998	A Murder of Crows	Professor Arthur Corvus	
1999	Clubland	Lipton T	Misspelled name as "Matt Pellegrino"
1999	Certain Guys	Cal	
1999	Word of Mouth	Darrow	Credited as "Robert Rand"
1999	Honest Injun		
2000	House of Love	Neil	Credited as "Henry Taggert"
2000	Lost in the Pershing Point Hotel	Tripper	
2000	Drowning Mona	Murphy "Murph" Calzone	
2001	Say It Isn't So	Jimmy Mitchelson	
2001	Mulholland Drive	Joe Messing	
2001	Fault Lines		
2001	Monsters	Sally Spinelli	
2002	The Killer Next Door / Ronnie	Keith Schwann	
2002	Mother Ghost	The Waiter	Misspelled name as "Mark Pellagrino"
2002	Treading Water	The Actor	
2003	Moving Alan	Alan Kennard	
2003	The Hunted	Dale Hewitt	
2004	Spartan	Convict	
2004	Twisted	Jimmy Schmidt	
2004	National Treasure	FBI Agent Johnson	
2005	Ellie Parker	Justin	
2005	Capote	Richard Eugene "Dick" Hickock	
2006	Caffeine	Tom	
2007	The Number 23	Kyle Flinch	
2008	The Coverup / The Thacker Case	Ron Pebble	
2009	An American Affair	Graham Caswell	
2009	Two:Thirteen	John Tyler	
2009	Disappearing In America	The Bodyguard	Misspelled name as "Mark Pellligrino" only in the opening credits
2011	Joint Body / The Bandit	Nick Burke	
2011	Bad Meat	Doug Kendrew	
2011	Post	Mark	
2013	Bad Turn Worse / We Gotta Get Out Of This Place	Giff	
2013	The Trials of Cate McCall	Detective Robert Welch	
2018	Beirut	Cal Riley	
2024	Beverly Hills Cop: Axel F	Beck	
TBA	Strangers in a Strange Land †	Grungy Man	Post-production

=== Television ===
Year	Title	Role	Notes
1987	L.A. Law	Punk	Episode: "The Wizard of Odds"
1988	What Price Victory		TV movie
1989	Doogie Howser, M.D.	Dude	Episode: "She Ain't Heavy, She's My Cousin"
1990	Hunter	John Reynolds	Episode: "Brotherly Love"
1990	Tales from the Crypt	Punk	Episode: "The Switch"
1992	Northern Exposure	Rolf Hauser	Episode: "Nothing's Perfect"
1992	The Hat Squad	Daniel Wilson "D.W." Strong	Episode: "Family Business"
1993	The Commish	Joe "Joey" Lund	Episode: "The Ides of March"
1993	Class of '61	Skinner	TV movie
1994	Viper	Yuri	Episode: "Pilot"
1994	Renegade	Cletus Freed	Episode: "Living Legend"
1994	Knight Rider 2010	Robert Lee	TV movie
1995	Marker	Charles "Chuck" Calder	Episode: "The Pink Unicorn"
1995	Deadly Games	Ross Logan	Episode: "Car Mechanic"
1996	ER	Nathan Conley	Episode: "The Right Thing"
1996	Nash Bridges	Ferguson	Episode: "Genesis"
1996	The Sentinel	Ray Weston	Episode: "Out of the Past"
1996	Little Surprises	Jack	TV movie
1996	The Cherokee Kid	Frank Bonner	TV movie
1997	Born Into Exile	Walter, Owner of Eatery	TV movie
1997–2002	NYPD Blue	Frank Watkins / Stanley Struel / Steve Dansick	Special guest (seasons 5–6 and 9; 4 episodes)
1998	Brimstone	Robert Busch	Episode: "Ashes"
1999	The X-Files	Derwood Spinks	Episode: "Hungry"
2001	The Beast	Bobby James / Robert Tibideau	Recurring role (season 1; 3 episodes)
2001	Thieves	Bill	Episode: "The General"
2002	Crossing Jordan	Keith Walker	Episode: "Lost and Found"
2002	Astronauts	Hollywood	TV movie
2003	The Practice	Herrick Smoltz	Episode: "Character Evidence"
2003, 2011	CSI: Miami	Jed Gold / Greg Calomar	Episode: "Hurricane Anthony"; Episode: "About Face"
2004	NYPD 2069	Phil Pavelka	TV movie
2005, 2009	CSI: Crime Scene Investigation	Elliot Perolta / Bruno Curtis	Episode: "Gum Drops" (deleted scene); Episode: "All In"
2006	The Unit	Gary Soto	Episode: "Exposure"
2006	Without a Trace	Sadik Marku	Episode: "Requiem"; Episode: "The Damage Done"
2006–2007	Dexter	Paul Bennett	Recurring role (seasons 1–2; 8 episodes)
2007	Burn Notice	Quentin King	Episode: "Identity"
2007	Grey's Anatomy	Chris	Episode: "A Change Is Gonna Come"
2007	Women's Murder Club	Sam Johannes	Episode: "Maybe Baby"
2007	K-Ville	Quentin	Episode: "AKA"
2007	Suspect	Jack Lambroso	TV movie
2008	Knight Rider	Walter "Walt" Cooperton	Episode: "Knight of the Hunter"
2008	Numb3rs	Tim Hamer	Episode: "Thirty-Six Hours"
2008	Prison Break	Patrick Vikan	Episodes: "Deal or No Deal" and "Just Business"
2008	Criminal Minds	Lieutenant Evans	Episode: "Brothers in Arms"
2008, 2012	Chuck	Fulcrum Agent / Hector	Episode: "Chuck Versus the Fat Lady"; Episode: "Chuck Versus the Goodbye"
2009	Fear Itself	Mr. Drake	Episode: "The Spirit Box"
2009	Ghost Whisperer	Ben Tillman	Episode: "Leap of Faith"
2009	The Philanthropist	Walter Kerabatsos	Episode: "San Diego"
2009	The Mentalist	Von McBride	Episode: "Red Menace"
2009–2010	Lost	Jacob	Recurring role (seasons 5–6; 7 episodes)
2009–2020	Supernatural	Nick / Lucifer	Recurring role (seasons 5, 7, 11; 13 episodes); Main role (seasons 12–14); Special guest (season 15; 1 episode)
2011	Breakout Kings	Virgil Downing	Episode: "Paid in Full"
2011	The Closer	Gavin Q. Baker III	Recurring role (season 7; 6 episodes)
2011	Locke & Key	Rendell Locke	TV movie
2011–2014	Being Human	James Bishop	Main role (season 1); Recurring role (seasons 2–4; 5 episodes)
2012	Castle	Tom Dempsey / Tom Dempsey III	Episode: "The Blue Butterfly"
2012	Grimm	Jarold Kempfer	Episode: "Bad Moon Rising"
2012	Hemingway & Gellhorn	Max Eastman	TV movie
2012	Revolution	Jeremy Baker	Recurring role (season 1; 4 episodes)
2012	Person of Interest	Daniel "Danny" Drake	Episode: "'Til Death"
2013–2014	The Tomorrow People	Jedikiah Price	Main role (season 1)
2015	Chicago P.D.	Jim Anderoff	Episode: "Disco Bob"
2015	The Returned	Jack Winship	Main role (season 1)
2015–2016	Quantico	Executive Assistant Director to the FBI Clayton Haas	Recurring role (season 1; 11 episodes)
2017–2020	13 Reasons Why	Deputy Bill Standall	Recurring role (seasons 1–3; 17 episodes); Main role (season 4)
2021	9-1-1	Mitchell Trent	Episode: "Brawl in Cell Block 9-1-1"
2021–2024	American Rust	Virgil Poe	Main role (season 1; 9 credited episodes - only appears in 6, season 2; 10 episodes)
2022	The Rookie: Feds	Walter Krebs / Logan Hess	Episode: "Face Off"
2023	Class of '09	Mark Tupirik	Special guest (season 1; 3 episodes)
2023	Underdeveloped	Nader	Main role (season 1; 6 credited episodes - only appears in 5 episodes)
2025	Murdaugh: Death in the Family	Curtis "Eddie" Smith	Miniseries
TBA	A Motel †	TBA	Pre-production, also co-executive producer

=== Video games ===
Year	Title	Role	Notes
2018	Far Cry 5	Jacob Seed	Voice and motion capture performance
2019	Anthem	Grandmaster Adams	Voice

=== Other ===
Year	Title	Role	Notes
2015–2018	The Hillywood Show	Dancer / Slimer	Supernatural Parody; Supernatural Parody 2

== Awards and nominations ==
Year	Award	Category	Nominated work	Result
2006	Screen Actors Guild Awards	Outstanding Performance by a Cast in a Motion Picture	Capote	Nominated
2010	Saturn Awards	Best Guest Performance in a Television Series	Lost	Nominated
2017	Teen Choice Awards	Choice TV Villain	Supernatural	Nominated
