= The Son (Meyer novel) =

2013 novel by Philipp Meyer

- Cover of first edition
- Author: Philipp Meyer
- Language: English
- Genre: Western
- Set in: Texas
- Publisher: Ecco
- Publication date: 28 May 2013
- Publication place: United States
- Media type: Print (hardcover)
- Pages: 592
- ISBN: 978-0-06-212039-7
- OCLC: 834159090
- Dewey Decimal: 813/.6
- LC Class: PS3613.E976 S66 2013

The Son is the second novel by the American writer Philipp Meyer. Published in 2013, the novel was loosely conceived as the second in a thematic trilogy on the American myth following Meyer's first novel, American Rust.

The novel focuses on three generations of the McCullough family: Eli McCullough, the vicious patriarch who was the first male child born in the newly formed Texas, his son Peter McCullough, a learned man who disagrees with his father's brutality but is powerless to stop it, and Eli's great-granddaughter and Peter's granddaughter, Jeanne Anne "J.A." McCullough, who inherited her great-grandfather's toughness and went on to become a wealthy oil baroness.

In 2017, the novel was adapted into the television series, The Son, starring Pierce Brosnan as Eli McCullough.

== Plot ==
=== Eli ===
In 1849, 13-year old Eli McCullough's family is attacked by the Comanches. The attack results in the rape and murder of his sister and mother. Eli and his older brother are kidnapped. While Eli's brother Martin is eventually killed, Eli is adopted by the Kotsoteka Comanches and given the name Tiehteti. Initially treated as a slave, he eventually comes to earn the respect of his captors and is adopted by Toshaway, the man who kidnapped him. A series of misfortunes eventually hits the tribe, including an outbreak of disease which kills Toshaway and the rest of Eli's Comanche family. In order to provide for the survivors, Eli allows himself to be sold back into white society.

Eli has a miserable time integrating back into white society. After fighting for the Confederacy in the American Civil War, he steals a bag of gold which he uses to buy land and amass a fortune. When his neighbour, Arturo Garcia, steals some of his cattle, he murders him and bears a grudge against his nephew, Pedro Garcia, who comes to take his place. He marries Madeleine Black, the daughter of a judge. She and their eldest son are eventually killed by a band of Lipan Apaches who Eli tracks down and murders in the 1880s.

=== Peter ===
In 1915, Peter McCullough witnesses his father stir up anti-Mexican sentiment to murder the Garcias, a wealthy family friendly with the McCulloughs who have lived on the land since before America was a country. The resulting slaughter leads to multi-day riots where the remaining Spanish families in the surrounding area are murdered or forced to flee. Eli buys up the Garcia's land afterwards. Peter is haunted by his actions and becomes estranged from his wife, who sees nothing wrong with the incidents, and his sons who participated in the slaughter. Two years after the murders, the sole survivor, Maria Garcia, returns to the land. Peter shelters her and the two fall in love despite her knowledge of the McCulloughs efforts to exterminate her family. After a month, Peter's father, his brother Phineas and his wife Sally offer Maria $10,000 to disappear. She flees to Mexico and Peter spends his fortune tracking her down, eventually finding her and having two children with her.

=== J.A. ===
In 2012, J.A., a wealthy woman due to the oil found on the family land, collapses alone in her home. With no one to help her she reflects on her life on the ranch where she was partially raised by her great-grandfather Eli who had already become a legend.

Though she has older brothers, J.A. always knows that she is the only one who will care for the ranch. When her three older brothers go to fight in World War II, she is told by her uncle Phineas that her father is a weak man who is playing at being a cattle rancher while losing hundred of thousands of dollars. Shortly after, her father dies and she inherits all the McCullough land. J.A. becomes a multi-millionaire by 19. Her great-uncle Phineas sets her up with Hank Boudreaux, a man hired to help tap the oil on the land. She eventually marries Hank though, to his disappointment, she does not take to motherhood and after her third child she returns to work. Hank later dies in a hunting accident and she lives out the rest of her life amassing money and lovers and feeling her children are failures. Several times she is contacted by Mexicans claiming to be related to her whom she dismisses. In her 90s, a young man called Ulises Garcia comes to work for her. He eventually is able to prove that Peter is his great-grandfather, but despite knowing that he is speaking the truth, she calls the police on him, only to fall and hit her head.

Knowing that he will be blamed for what happened to J.A., Ulises leaves in a panic but not before setting her house on fire.

== Reception ==
Will Blythe writing for The New York Times called the novel "masterly" and compared it to Cormac McCarthy's Western Blood Meridian. Ron Charles writing for The Washington Post praised the book's wide-ranging scope and called it a "monumental novel". John Burnside in The Guardian praised the novel for "its careful dissection of imperial power".

== Awards ==
The Son was a finalist for the 2014 Pulitzer Prize for Fiction. It was on the 2015 International Dublin Literary Award longlist. Kirkus listed it as one of the Best Fiction Books of 2013.

In 2014, the novel won the Lucien Barrière Literary Award which was presented at the 2014 Deauville American Film Festival.
