= List of Hemlock Grove episodes =

Hemlock Grove is an American supernatural drama series developed by Brian McGreevy and Lee Shipman, based on McGreevy's novel of the same name. The first season premiered exclusively via Netflix's web streaming service on April 19, 2013. The second season premiered on July 11, 2014. The third and final 10-episode season premiered on October 23, 2015.

== Series overview ==
Season	Episodes	Originally released
1	13	April 19, 2013
2	10	July 11, 2014
3	10	October 23, 2015

== Episodes ==
=== Season 1 (2013) ===
No. overall	No. in season	Title	Directed by	Written by	Original release date
1	1	"Jellyfish in the Sky"	Eli Roth	Brian McGreevy & Lee Shipman	April 19, 2013
A young man, Peter Romancek, and his mother move to the town of Hemlock Grove. The town becomes restive after a young girl's corpse is found and strange rumors about Peter's nature lead the townsfolk to suspect him.
2	2	"The Angel"	Deran Sarafian	Brian McGreevy & Lee Shipman	April 19, 2013
Roman Godfrey confronts Peter, who was investigating the scene of the crime by himself. The two become friends, with Peter sharing his secret with Roman. Meanwhile, Roman's cousin Letha discovers that she is pregnant, but claims that the child's father is an angel.
3	3	"The Order of the Dragon"	Deran Sarafian	Brian McGreevy & Lee Shipman	April 19, 2013
A second body is found by Christina, a local student. Dr. Clementine Chasseur arrives in town to investigate the murders. Meanwhile, Roman decides to find the killer on his own and asks for Peter's help.
4	4	"In Poor Taste"	David Semel	Sheila Callaghan	April 19, 2013
Letha starts feeling attracted to Peter, who looks to the help of his cousin Destiny to use her powers in order to track down the murderer. However, to do that, Roman and Peter must bring her some remains of one of the victims and they get in trouble when the police arrive at the cemetery.
5	5	"Hello, Handsome"	David Semel	Mark Verheiden	April 19, 2013
After being almost caught by the police, Peter brings the remains to Destiny and gets some clues about the murders. Meanwhile, a gala is held at the Godfrey Enterprises' Tower, where things become hectic. Dr. Chasseur remembers what she had to do to join the Order of the Dragon."
6	6	"The Crucible"	Deran Sarafian	Daniel Paige	April 19, 2013
Peter and Roman's investigation takes them to the Godfrey's old steel mill, where they find a missing piece of the puzzle. Meanwhile, Christina has a date with a friend, whom she attacks when visions of the body she found begin to torment her.
7	7	"Measure of Disorder"	Deran Sarafian	Brian McGreevy & Lee Shipman	April 19, 2013
Peter plans to leave the city with his mother while he still can, but stays upon learning of Chasseur's suspicions. Peter's relationship with Letha puts a strain on his friendship with Roman.
8	8	"Catabasis"	David Straiton	Brian McGreevy & Lee Shipman	April 19, 2013
Roman storms the White Tower looking for answers and discovers the secret project of Dr. Pryce, who puts him into a coma. While unconscious, Roman's dreams lead him closer to the truth about the murders.
9	9	"What Peter Can Live Without"	David Straiton	Rafe Judkins & Lauren LeFranc	April 19, 2013
The next full moon is coming and Chasseur makes preparations to catch the murderer. Peter has dinner with Letha's parents, Norman and Marie, after they learn of Letha's relationship.
10	10	"What God Wants"	TJ Scott	Daniel Paige	April 19, 2013
A weakened Roman emerges from his coma and reunites with Peter in time to attempt to stop the killer from claiming his next victims.
11	11	"The Price"	TJ Scott	Mark Verheiden	April 19, 2013
Accused of being the killer, Peter hides away with his mother. Christina disappears without a trace, and Roman finally begins to face the truth about his nature.
12	12	"Children of the Night"	Deran Sarafian	Brian McGreevy & Lee Shipman	April 19, 2013
When corpses are discovered after the full moon, Roman and Peter must make preparations to confront the killer, unaware that Letha is the next target.
13	13	"Birth"	Deran Sarafian	Brian McGreevy & Lee Shipman	April 19, 2013
Helped by Roman's sister, Shelley, Roman and Peter finally defeat the killer. Tragedy strikes once more when the time comes for Letha to give birth.

=== Season 2 (2014) ===
No. overall	No. in season	Title	Directed by	Written by	Original release date
14	1	"Blood Pressure"	Spencer Susser	Evan Dunsky	July 11, 2014
When Lynda is arrested, Peter is forced to return to Hemlock Grove and raise money for her lawyer, while Roman, fully transformed into an upir, struggles to deal with his new condition.
15	2	"Gone Sis"	Vincenzo Natali	Jennifer Haley	July 11, 2014
Miranda Cates, a young woman who is attacked while driving in the outskirts of the city, seeks for aid in Roman's house. Meanwhile, Peter's visions return, alerting him that another tragic chain of events is being set in motion.
16	3	"Luna Rea"	Peter Cornwell	Peter Blake	July 11, 2014
To raise money for Lynda's lawyer, Peter performs a scheme that involves him transforming into a werewolf outside of the full moon. Meanwhile, Christina's wolf form rises from her grave and pursues Shelley, who is still on the run and while investigating the meaning behind his visions, Peter meets Roman again.
17	4	"Bodily Fluids"	Floria Sigismondi	David Paul Francis	July 11, 2014
While Peter runs against time to save a child from being killed, Roman investigates Dr. Pryce's secrets and Miranda discovers Letha and Roman's baby, which is still alive and being held in secret at Roman's house.
18	5	"Hemlock Diego's Policy Player's Dream Book"	Sanaa Hamri	Charles H. Eglee	July 11, 2014
Roman discovers the contents of Pryce's secret experiments while Shelley finally looks for her uncle Norman's help. Elsewhere, Peter and Destiny execute a daring plan to rescue Lynda while she is transported to the prison.
19	6	"Such Dire Stuff"	Peter Cornwell	Evan Dunsky	July 11, 2014
Pryce starts a treatment to have Roman become human again, but his assistant, Dr. Zheleznova-Burdukovskaya has other plans. Meanwhile, Shelley is about to return home when she is forced to confront her friend's abusive father.
20	7	"Lost Generation"	David Straiton	Jennifer Haley	July 11, 2014
Shelly is finally reunited with her family, and Pryce decides to use his secret experiment, Prycilla, in a plan to have her finally live a normal life. Meanwhile, Norman's investigations about his former wife's death lead him to discover Olivia's true nature.
21	8	"Unicorn"	David Petrarca	Peter Blake	July 11, 2014
The procedure to transfer Shelly's mind to Prycilla's body is a success and she is finally ready to die in peace, but by Burdukovskaya's suggestion, Olivia considers feeding on Prycilla to recover her immortality and Destiny uses her powers to discover the cultists' master plan.
22	9	"Tintypes"	Billy Gierhart	David Paul Francis	July 11, 2014
Once knowing that Letha's daughter Nadia is the real target of the cultists, Peter and Roman fight them to protect her, while Olivia has a change of heart and decides to live the rest of her mortal life with Norman while making amends with the rest of her family, until Norman himself confronts Olivia about her past crimes.
23	10	"Demons and the Dogstar"	David Straiton	Charles H. Eglee	July 11, 2014
The cultists are all dead, but Miranda is frightened with Nadia's mysterious powers and learns who was responsible to have her stranded in Hemlock Grove, and why. While Miranda contemplates killing herself with the baby, Roman and Peter rush to stop her, and Olivia, rejected by Norman, starts a rampage in the White Tower.

=== Season 3 (2015) ===
No. overall	No. in season	Title	Directed by	Written by	Original release date
24	1	"A Place to Fall"	Russell Lee Fine	David Paul Francis	October 23, 2015
An investigation into Dr. Spivak's past aids in the search for Nadia and Miranda. Roman comes face to face with a mysterious stranger. Andreas and Destiny discuss what their futures hold.
25	2	"Souls on Ice"	Coky Giedroyc	Travis Jackson & Nader Navidi	October 23, 2015
Annie reveals her secrets to Roman as they probe the connection between two attacks. Olivia is unable to feed and Miranda must fend for herself.
26	3	"The House in the Woods"	David Straiton	Peter Blake	October 23, 2015
Pryce deduces the nature of the creature and looks for links to the Spivak monster. Roman explores upir customs. Peter grills Andreas about the heist.
27	4	"Every Beast"	Marc Jobst	Evan Dunsky	October 23, 2015
Peter makes a bold move to head off a war between the Gypsies and the Croatian mob. After an agonizing detox, Pryce delivers disturbing news to Olivia.
28	5	"Boy in the Box"	David Straiton	Charles H. Eglee	October 23, 2015
Pryce reflects on his troubled past and Olivia successfully reconnects with Annie. Peter asks for Roman's help regarding Andreas and later breaks the news to Destiny about his death.
29	6	"Pendant"	Jim O'Hanlon	Peter Blake	October 23, 2015
Roman's relationship with Annie becomes more complicated. Olivia begins to feel the full effects of the virus and makes a startling discovery. Shelley decides to follow her heart. Destiny, highly suspicious of the events surrounding Andreas' death, launches a dangerous investigation.
30	7	"Todos Santos"	Jonathan Amiel	Evan Dunsky	October 23, 2015
A violent attack at the office gives surprising new information to Roman and Pryce. Olivia's sins haunt her as her illness progresses. Despite Peter's warnings, Destiny continues to dig for answers in the wrong places and ultimately ends up at Roman's doorstep, resulting in a shocking confrontation.
31	8	"Dire Night on the Worm Moon"	Carl Tibbetts	Travis Jackson & Nader Navidi	October 23, 2015
Annie condemns Roman for his actions, and he takes steps to cover his tracks. Pryce offers a flawed solution to Olivia's predicament, and later meets up with Shelley. Peter makes a heartbreaking discovery.
32	9	"Damascus"	Russell Lee Fine	David Paul Francis	October 23, 2015
A devastated Shelley agrees to a selfish request but later changes her mind when she learns the truth about her mother. Peter and Roman hunt down Spivak. Pryce's attempt at securing his future goes terribly wrong. Annie betrays her brother.
33	10	"Brian's Song"	Russell Lee Fine	Charles H. Eglee & Lorna Clarke Osunsanmi and Peter Blake	October 23, 2015
Roman is left alone and isolated by the consequences of his actions. Shelley finds new purpose and leaves town. Olivia's last ditch attempt to save herself goes up in flames. Peter returns from the grave for a final reckoning.
