= American Rust (TV series) =

American television drama series

- Promotional poster for the first season
- Genre: Crime drama
- Created by: Dan Futterman
- Based on: American Rust by Philipp Meyer
- Showrunner: Dan Futterman
- Starring: Jeff Daniels; Maura Tierney; David Alvarez; Bill Camp; Julia Mayorga; Alex Neustaedter; Mark Pellegrino; Rob Yang; Kyle Beltran; Lauren Vélez
- Country of origin: United States
- Original language: English
- No. of seasons: 2
- No. of episodes: 19

Production
- Executive producers: Dan Futterman; Adam Rapp; Elisa Ellis; Jeff Daniels; Katie O'Connell Marsh; Michael De Luca; Paul Martino
- Production companies: SouthSlope Pictures; Boat Rocker Studios; Showtime Networks (season 1); Amazon MGM Studios (season 2)

Original release
- Network: Showtime
- Release: September 12 – November 7, 2021
- Network: Amazon Prime Video
- Release: March 28, 2024

American Rust is an American crime drama television series created by Dan Futterman based on the 2009 novel by Philipp Meyer. The series premiered on September 12, 2021, on Showtime. In January 2022, the series was canceled after one season by Showtime. In June 2022, the series was revived for a second season by Amazon Freevee. The second season was released on March 28, 2024 on Amazon Prime Video. In July 2024, the series was once again canceled.

== Premise ==
Set in a small Rust Belt town in Pennsylvania, chief of police Del Harris takes on an investigation when the son of the woman he loves is accused of murder.

== Cast ==
=== Main ===
- Jeff Daniels as Chief Del Harris
- Maura Tierney as Grace Poe
- David Alvarez as Isaac English
- Bill Camp as Henry English (season 1)
- Julia Mayorga as Lee English
- Alex Neustaedter as Billy Poe
- Mark Pellegrino as Virgil Poe
- Rob Yang as Deputy Steve Park
- Kyle Beltran as Detective Ramon Fisher (season 2; guest season 1)
- Luna Lauren Velez as Detective Angela Burgos (season 2)

=== Recurring ===
- Dallas Roberts as Jackson Berg
- Clea Lewis as Jillian
- Nicole Chanel Williams as JoJo
- Federico Rodriguez as Alejandro
- Caitlin Cavannaugh as Joelle
- Tom Pecinka as Nate
- Christopher Denham as Russell Wolfe (season 2)
- Marc Menchaca as Vic Walker (season 2)
- Britian Seibert as Cynthia Frazier (season 2)

== Episodes ==
=== Series overview ===
Season	Title	Episodes	Originally released		
Season	Title	Episodes	First released	Last released	Network
1	-	9	September 12, 2021	November 7, 2021	Showtime
2	Broken Justice	10	March 28, 2024		Amazon Prime

=== Season 1 (2021) ===
No. overall	No. in season	Title	Directed by	Written by	Original release date	U.S. viewers (millions)
1	1	"The Mill"	John Dahl	Dan Futterman	September 12, 2021	0.264
2	2	"Happy Returns"	John Dahl	Adam Rapp	September 19, 2021	0.244
3	3	"Forgive Us Our Trespasses"	Craig Zisk	Céline C. Robinson	September 26, 2021	0.237
4	4	"My Name is Billy"	Craig Zisk	Alvaro Rodriguez	October 3, 2021	0.362
5	5	"Jojo Ameri-Go"	Darnell Martin	Jaquén Castellanos	October 10, 2021	0.333
6	6	"Debt Collection"	Darnell Martin	Charly Evon Simpson	October 17, 2021	0.324
7	7	"Blue Mountains"	John Dahl	Jaquén Castellanos	October 24, 2021	0.292
8	8	"St. Sebastian"	John Dahl	Adam Rapp	October 31, 2021	0.288
9	9	"Denmark"	John Dahl	Dan Futterman	November 7, 2021	0.394

=== Season 2: Broken Justice (2024) ===
No. overall	No. in season	Title	Directed by	Written by	Original release date
10	1	"Homecoming"	Jim McKay	Dan Futterman	March 28, 2024
11	2	"The Golden Goose"	Jim McKay	Jean Kyoung Frazier	March 28, 2024
12	3	"Iron Sky"	Michael Lehmann	Adam Rapp	March 28, 2024
13	4	"The Hand You're Delt"	Michael Lehmann	Alvaro Rodriguez	March 28, 2024
14	5	"Light Me Up"	Radium Cheung	Ted Malawer	March 28, 2024
15	6	"Daddy Issues"	Radium Cheung	Jessica Brickman	March 28, 2024
16	7	"Tree"	Melissa Hickey	Delondra Mesa	March 28, 2024
17	8	"Ponderosa"	Melissa Hickey	Ted Malawer	March 28, 2024
18	9	"Faster Horses, Younger Women and More Money"	Jim McKay	Jessica Brickman	March 28, 2024
19	10	"Confessions"	Jim McKay	Adam Rapp	March 28, 2024

== Production ==
In November 2017, a television adaptation of American Rust was ordered to series by USA Network. The pilot episode was written by Brian McGreevy, Lee Shipman, and Philipp Meyer, and to be directed by David Gordon Green. The series was scrapped on January 25, 2018, after having trouble finding a leading actor for the show.

In July 2019, the adaptation was recommissioned by Showtime, to be written by Dan Futterman and starring Jeff Daniels as Harris; they both also serve as executive producers. In March 2020, Maura Tierney, Bill Camp, David Alvarez, Alex Neustaedter and Julia Mayorga were cast as series regulars. In March 2021, Mark Pellegrino joined the cast in a series regular role, while Dallas Roberts, Clea Lewis and Nicole Chanel Williams were cast in recurring roles.

The series was filmed in and around Pittsburgh. On January 25, 2022, Showtime canceled the series after one season. On June 9, 2022, Amazon Freevee picked up the series for a second season. The second season began shooting in Western Pennsylvania in November 2022 and completed in May 2023.

The second season, subtitled American Rust: Broken Justice, was released on March 28, 2024 on Amazon Prime Video. On July 26, 2024, Amazon Prime Video opted to not renew the series for a third season.

== Reception ==
American Rust has received mixed-to-negative reviews from critics. On Rotten Tomatoes, the first season holds an approval rating of 28% based on 32 critic reviews, with an average rating of 5.8/10. The website's critics consensus reads, "American Rust's tale of America lost is a worthy one, but despite an A-list cast it simply does not have the narrative clarity or heft necessary to do its subject matter justice." On Metacritic, the first season has a score of 48 out of 100 based on 22 reviews, indicating "mixed or average reviews".

Based on three episodes for review, Zack Handlen of The A.V. Club gave it a "C" grade, writing "There's a lot not to like about Rust, a dreary, well-acted, badly written chunk of misery porn" and that "the dialogue is all flatly expository". Handlen concluded with, "American Rust likely has a story worth telling, and a setting worth exploring, but this version fails to make much of a case for either."
