= The Son (TV series) =

American Western drama television series

- Genre: Western; Drama
- Based on: The Son by Philipp Meyer
- Developed by: Philipp Meyer; Lee Shipman; Brian McGreevy
- Starring: Pierce Brosnan; Jacob Lofland; Henry Garrett; Paola Núñez; Carlos Bardem; Zahn McClarnon; Jess Weixler; David Wilson Barnes; Sydney Lucas; James Parks; Elizabeth Frances; Shane Graham; Kathryn Prescott
- Composer: Nathan Barr
- Country of origin: United States
- Original language: English
- No. of seasons: 2
- No. of episodes: 20

Production
- Executive producers: Michael Connolly; Tom Lesinski; Jenna Santoianni; Tom Harper; Kevin Murphy; Philipp Meyer; Brian McGreevy; Lee Shipman
- Production location: Texas
- Cinematography: George Steel
- Editors: Josh Beal; Debby Germino; Jon Koslowsky
- Camera setup: Single-camera
- Running time: 42–49 minutes
- Production companies: Sonar Entertainment; El Jefe; Five & Dime Productions

Original release
- Network: AMC
- Release: April 8, 2017 – June 29, 2019

The Son is an American Western drama television series based on the 2013 novel of the same name by Philipp Meyer that aired on AMC for two seasons. The show was created and developed by Meyer, Brian McGreevy, and Lee Shipman. Twenty episodes over two seasons aired from April 8, 2017, through June 29, 2019.

== Plot ==
In 1849, Eli McCullough is kidnapped at the age of 13 by Comanches and raised as an adopted son. In 'present-day' 1915, he is a powerful, ruthless cattle baron turned oilman. He struggles to maintain his business empire as he looks to pass it on to his sons and grandchildren.

== Cast ==
- Pierce Brosnan as Eli McCullough, a Texas cattle baron who takes an interest in the oil industry
  - Jacob Lofland as young Eli (known to the Comanche as Tiehteti Taiboo "Pathetic White Boy")
- Henry Garrett as Pete McCullough, Eli's youngest son
- Paola Núñez as María García, Pete's childhood friend who becomes complicit in some of the escalating violence in South Texas
- Carlos Bardem as Pedro García (season 1)
- Zahn McClarnon as Toshaway, a Comanche tribal chief who views young Eli as a son after capturing him
- Jess Weixler as Sally McCullough, Pete's wife
- David Wilson Barnes as Phineas McCullough, Eli's middle son.
- Sydney Lucas as Jeannie McCullough, Eli's granddaughter and Pete's daughter, who becomes a key figure in the family business
  - Lois Smith as elderly Jeannie (recurring season 2)
- James Parks as Niles Gilbert
- Elizabeth Frances as Prairie Flower
- Shane Graham as Charles McCullough (season 2; recurring season 1)
- Kathryn Prescott as young Ingrid (season 2; recurring season 1)
  - Wendy Crewson as Ingrid (guest)
- Sean Alan Stone as Louis (recurring season 1)

== Production ==
Originally, Sam Neill was set to play the main character of the series, but left for personal reasons. Pierce Brosnan was cast to replace him. The production of the series started in June 2016. The series was filmed in and around Austin, TX.

A 10-episode season premiered on AMC on April 8, 2017. On May 12, 2017, the series was renewed for a second season. The second and final season premiered on April 27, 2019.

== Episodes ==
Season	Episodes	Originally released	
Season	Episodes	First released	Last released
1	10	April 8, 2017	June 10, 2017
2	10	April 27, 2019	June 29, 2019

=== Season 1 (2017) ===
No. overall	No. in season	Title	Directed by	Teleplay by	Original release date	U.S. viewers (millions)
1	1	"First Son of Texas"	Tom Harper	Philipp Meyer, Brian McGreevy and Lee Shipman	April 8, 2017	1.92
In 1849, young Eli McCullough and his brother, Martin, are taken captive by Comanches; the remaining family members are killed. Blaming Eli for his family's deaths, Martin becomes defiant with his captors and is killed in front of Eli. In 1915, Eli and his son Pete prepare for Eli's birthday party, while contending with cattle thieves and saboteurs of their burgeoning oil business.
2	2	"The Plum Tree"	Kevin Dowling	Daniel C. Connolly	April 8, 2017	1.92
In 1849, Eli's attempt to escape the Comanche camp is thwarted, and, after being punished, he becomes the Comanches' slave. In 1915, Eli and Pete debate over their captive, Cesar, whom they caught fleeing a sabotaged oil rig. Eli tortures Cesar, believed to also be linked to the thefts. Pete later escorts Cesar to a river to release him into Mexico. However, Cesar attacks Pete, forcing him to kill Cesar and secretly bury him.
3	3	"Second Empire"	Kevin Dowling	Kevin Murphy & Cami DeLavigne	April 15, 2017	1.55
In 1915, Eli and oldest son Phineas meet with potential investor William Philpott, who declines due to Eli's shaky finances and the unlikelihood of finding oil in the Rio Grande Valley. Back home, Pete experiences guilt over Cesar's death. In Mexico, Cesar's father-in-law, Pedro García, supplies the rebel, Aniceto Pizaña, despite future backlash from the McCulloughs. In 1849, young Eli begins training as a Comanche warrior but causes trouble when he publicly flirts with Prairie Flower, who is being wooed by another.
4	4	"Death Song"	Olatunde Osunsanmi	Smith Henderson & Philipp Meyer	April 22, 2017	1.39
In 1849, young Eli must help a severely wounded Comanche back to camp, while evading Texas Rangers on patrol. In 1915, María García warns Pete that something bad is going to happen. He and Eli inform the Rangers of the Mexican rebels' plan to derail a train. Eli is told to form a posse. They find tools to be used in the derailment and wait for the rebels to return. Pete captures their female scout and releases her after the rebels retreat, but is forced to kill her when she fires at one of his men. Eli assures him that her death was necessary, however, Pete surmises that a border war is beginning.
5	5	"No Prisoners"	Olatunde Osunsanmi	Brian McGreevy & Lee Shipman	April 29, 2017	1.21
In 1849, the Comanches sneak up on a Tonkawa camp only to find it deserted, ravaged by smallpox. Eli is ordered to gather their horses and what supplies that he can. While doing so, he finds a survivor who specifies items to take, so that the Comanche will also become diseased. Eli refuses. In 1915, the McCulloughs' notoriety from the ambush has consequences, when their homestead is attacked. Both Marie and Jeannie seek help, and it arrives with Pedro's men fending off the rebels. Eli sees oil on Jeannie's horse and asks what route she traveled.
6	6	"The Buffalo Hunter"	Jeremy Webb	Julia Ruchman	May 6, 2017	1.30
Young Eli finds a group of white hunters skinning some buffalo. He tells them that he recently escaped a Comanche camp, and the hunters vow to protect him, but Eli is merely a distraction for a Comanche raid. The lead hunter and a girl are taken captive. The hunter is later tortured, and Eli secretly puts him out of his misery. In 1915, Charles McCullough learns that Ramon, a farmhand, might have led the rebels there for the attack. Ramon is hanged in front of a remorseful Charles. Eli and Jeannie search for and find the oil seep, but it is in the Garcías' territory.
7	7	"Marriage Bond"	Jeremy Webb	Kevin Murphy & Julia Ruchman	May 13, 2017	1.17
Upon learning of Ramon's death, Eli suggests to Pete that Charles leave the ranch. Pete takes Charles and Jeannie to the McCullough home in Austin. Charles admits his complicity, but adds that he didn't expect Ramon would be hanged. Pete tells Sally that he cannot rise above his family's violent tendencies and suggests the children remain in Austin. A troubled María visits him, and they have sex. In 1850, Eli tries to help Ingrid, the captive girl, who wishes to die, but Prairie Flower warns him to stay away from her. While hunting, Eli is approached by Charges the Enemy, who is courting Flower. Charges threatens the two of them before knocking Eli off a cliff.
8	8	"Honey Hunt"	John David Coles	Daniel C. Connolly	May 20, 2017	1.26
Charges returns to camp without Eli, stating that Eli escaped during the hunt. Flower wishes to search for Eli, but Toshaway informs her that her father accepted Charges' dowry and the wedding will soon happen. She sneaks off to search for Eli, but Charges stops her by saying all supplies will be cut off from her family if she continues. She relents and they marry. In 1915, Pete and María plan for a future, once they are free from their respective spouses. Eli and Phineas attend a party for a judge, whom Phineas manages to bribe to help secure the oil seep on the García property. Alone, Eli is approached by the daughter of an Apache who followed him after Eli slaughtered a village in 1881. Eli states that her people killed his wife and son, and she shoots him. He envisions his younger self helping him die but Phineas saves him.
9	9	"The Prophecy"	Tom Vaughan	Julia Ruchman	June 3, 2017	1.06
Young Eli, with his injured leg, finds a settler named Maggie at her camp. She nurses him back to health, but her solitude all these years after leaving her group seems to have affected her mind. However, she tells his fortune, mentioning his long life and having three sons. When he later learns of her plan to turn him in for a reward, he escapes as she curses his sons' legacy. In 1915, Eli tells Phineas that his injury was a sign and calls off the bribe and oil scheme, at the risk of losing the ranch. Eli later finds a saloon burning; Phineas admits to it, only because Eli secretly wanted to frame Pedro García. Pete finds a jar of oil in Jeannie's room and questions Eli, who reveals the truth of trying to get rid of Pedro. Pete leaves the ranch.
10	10	"Scalps"	Tom Vaughan	Philipp Meyer, Brian McGreevy, & Kevin Murphy	June 10, 2017	1.16
With the rumor that Pedro García's men were seen running from the saloon fire, Eli declares war and rallies an angry mob. Pete arrives at the García home to warn them. He suggests fleeing, but Pedro declines and prepares his men. Pete assists them and fires upon his father's army. Many casualties occur on both sides; all of the Garcías are killed, except María who flees with Pete as seen by Phineas. When Eli relates the battle to his family, Sally asks about Pete. Alone, Phineas tells her the truth. The McCulloughs are later granted the García property. In 1850, Eli returns to the Comanche camp seeking revenge on Charges. Toshaway asks the elders for compensation, and they give him four horses; he also gives Eli a pistol of his own. Eli still pines for Flower. Later, on a hunt, the Comanches are attacked by Texas Rangers. Charges is shot, but Eli prevents a Ranger from scalping Charges, who apologizes to Eli before dying from his wounds. Eli then scalps the Ranger and Toshaway praises Eli on his first scalp. Both eras mirror each other, as Young Eli and Toshaway watch many settlers cross below them and Jeannie and her grandfather look over their newly acquired land.

=== Season 2 (2019) ===
No. overall	No. in season	Title	Directed by	Teleplay by	Original release date	U.S. viewers (millions)
11	1	"Numunuu"	Kevin Dowling	Kevin Murphy	April 27, 2019	0.674
1915 - Eli McCullouch and Niles Gilbert find Pete on a chain gang in Mexico. Eli pays a local guard for his release. In flashback, we see Pete and Maria on the run. Pete vows to exact revenge on his father. Maria counters that Pete is too weak and always has been. Eli tells Pete that the family have spent four months waiting for his return. He gives Pete the choice to come back for good or to ride off and make his own way. Pete promises to return and toe the line. 1988 - At the ranch, the family celebrate Jeannie McCullough's 85th birthday. Jeannie talks with a Mexican farmhand, Ulises Gonzales, who asks for a job in the stables, which she grants. Later, alone, Ulises takes out a revolver with P McCullouch engraved on the stock. 1915 – On their way back to Texas, Eli, Pete and Niles are stopped on the road by Mexican forces. Pete tries to negotiate but is unsuccessful. Eli reminds the commander that their president needs America to validate his rule and killing them will not help the cause. They are allowed to pass. Pete is welcomed home by his three children but Sally acts coldly. Sally demands to know what happened to Maria. Pete says he got her to safety, and they parted ways. 1852 – Led by Eli, the Comanche raid a Mexican homestead and kill all the occupants. Eli saves the life of one of the Comanche. Eli is reminded of when his home was raided, and he was captured whilst his family perished. 1915 – Phineas tells Pete that he was against rescuing him. Eli explains to Pete that he has been buying mineral rights from surrounding land with money generated from wells on the old Garcia lands. He wants Pete to accompany him to sabotage the wells of a neighbor that will not sell. In the night Eli and his men fill the wells with metal and cement. They are discovered and Eli and Pete, on horseback, lead the chasing group away whilst the others escape. Eli is dismounted and Pete rescue him. 1852 – Returning from the raid, the Comanche discover their camp has been attacked. Eli searches for his wife, Prairie Flower. She is safe but explains that the Apache took all their food and horses and killed everyone. Eli discovers Toshaway wounded. 1915 – Pete rides off into the night and hangs himself but cuts himself down and rides home.
12	2	"Ten Dollars and a Plucked Goose"	Kevin Dowling	Daniel C. Connolly	May 4, 2019	0.612
1915 – Christmas. Eli welcomes Pete home as a hero in front of the townsfolk. In flashback Maria sells her jewellery in Mexico and gives Pete the slip. Eli is approached by Eugene Monahan, who proposed a partnership but is rebuffed. Eli trys to persuade Pete to get involved in the oil business but he refuses. His daughter Jeannie challenges him regarding the story that he is a hero for fighting Mexicans, but he confesses that he crossed the border to take Maria Garcia to safety. 1852 – In the aftermath of the raid on their camp, Prairie Flower finds Ingrid alongside a dead Apache that she has killed. Toshaway tells Eli that they cannot survive on their own and must find another band of Comanches join with. 1988 – Jeannie finds one of her dogs has died. She calls for a ranch hand to bury the dog. Ulises Gonzales and Jeannie bury to dog then Jeannie invites Ulises for a drink. He confesses that he is not a legal immigrant. Jeannie says she does not care. Ulises says he has heard stories of the Colonel (Eli) and Jeannie plays a tape recording of his voice. Ulises implies that the stories are embellished, which upsets the old woman, and she tells him to leave. Ulises asks the other hands about Jeannie's children. He is told one drowned, the daughter lives in India and the other son is dying of AIDS. They also reveal the fate of the Garcia family at the hands of the McCulloughs. 1915 – Pete tells Phineas that he will inherit the family business and that he is expected to gain public office to smooth their way. Pete tries to make amends with Sally. Phineas confronts Eli about being cut out. He says that it is not because he is gay but that he is too loyal and doesn't think for himself. 1852 – Prairie Flower and Eli discuss leaving the tribe and joining the whites. Eli says he wants to stay with the tribe and Prairie Flower reveals that she is pregnant. 1915 – At Pete's suggestion, Eli tries to persuade Niles to take a long, paid vacation and writes off his loan on his bar. Niles tries to decline but Eli insists and reassures him it is not forever. A number of vehicles arrive at the McCullouch ranch and slaughter a great number of cattle, cutting off their heads. One of the men is Eugene Monahan. Pete hears a noise outside the house and finds one of the heads on a stake.
13	3	"The Blind Tiger"	Kevin Dowling	Anne-Marie Hess	May 11, 2019	0.654
1916 – Phineas discovers the people behind the slaughter. Phineas discusses his position with his lover, Vincent Hastings. Eli and Pete confront Monaghan. He denies the attack. He suggests that the McCullough family cannot manage their vast holdings and offers a deal again. Eli tells him to leave town. 1852 – The Comanche tribe is starving, and Prairie Flower's father dies. They slaughter Toshaway's horse for food. Toshaway is tracking another tribe, the Yap-Eaters. He tells Eli that their Chief is his son. 1916 – Sheriff Hallie approaches Monaghan to question him about the slaughter. He arrests Monaghan, who tries to bribe him. Hallie delivers Monaghan to Eli and Pete who warn him off again. 1852 – Toshaway's wound is still troubling him. The tribe discover the Yap-Eaters and Toshaway approaches his son, Fat Wolf, to ask for help. Prairie Flower and others give gifts to the Yap-Eaters. Fat Wolf allows them to join and gets Toshaway treatment. Eli and Prairie Flower discuss why Fat Wolf left Toshaway's tribe. 1916 – Sally meets Maria in the town and their exchange is polite but strained. Sally rushes to the music store and begs the use of Mr Wentworth (the children's music tutor) the use of his telephone. They discuss the cattle slaughter. He gives Sally a cannabis cigarette. Sally tells Eli that Maria is back. Monahan visits Maria, watched by Eli. Eli travels to Austin.
14	4	"Scalped a Dog"	Omar Madha	Wes Brown	May 18, 2019	0.527
1852 – Fat Wolf sees Ingrid trying to shoot arrows and gives her instruction. The Yap-Eaters spot a lone soldier and, against Toshaway's advice, Fat Wolf kills him. 1916 – Jonas announces that he has been accepted to Princeton University. Monaghan offers one of the McCullough's neighbors more money. Pete and Charles persuade the neighbor not to accept by reminding him of loyalties. Eli and Phineas meet with Cal brogan who admits that there are plans for Texas to control the oil business through the Railroad Commission and suggests Phineas for a position. Vincent persuades him to accept. Jeannie hears a youth bad mouthing her father and beats him. Sally and Pete ask her why she reacted badly and she admits that the youth said that Pete left town with 'a Mexican whore'. 1852 – Toshaway and Fat Wolf argue about the killing of the soldier in front of the tribe. Eli reads papers that the soldier was carrying and explains to the tribe that the army plans to build a fort close to their camp. Toshaway wants to move camp but Fat Wolf says the should attack the camp, which sets of a violent disagreement. Toshaway explains to Eli how Fat Wolf's mother shamed him and was sent away. Fat Wolf chose to go with is mother. He tells that Fat Wolf was kept at a fort for two years before escaping. 1916 – After a music lesson, Sally tries to return the cigarette, but she and Matthew end up in the barn smoking. Maria meets with one of her father's old workers to try and obtain their testimony against the Mccullough family but is sent away. Maria meets again with Monahan to discuss tactics. She visits Pete to ask him to take her side against his father. He refuses and tells her not to return. He reports the exchange to Eli and Phineas. 1982 – One of the Yap-Eaters, Scalped A Dog, sneaks up on Ingrid and threatens and assaults her. She downs him with two arrows then beats him to death. 1916 – Eli approached maria in town. He apologises for the results of the attack on the Garcias and says it was not his intention for people to die. He empathises and tells Maria he saw his own family slaughtered. He offers her a cut of the oil produced from the Garcia fields. She takes the contract but with the hope of using it against him.
15	5	"Hot Oil"	Omar Madha	Melanie Marnich	May 25, 2019	0.560
16	6	"The Blue Light"	Ellen Kuras	Julia Ruchman	June 1, 2019	0.559
17	7	"Somebody Get a Shovel"	Ellen Kuras	Robert Askins	June 8, 2019	0.559
18	8	"All Their Guilty Stains"	Jeremy Webb	Kevin Murphy & Nick Mueller	June 15, 2019	0.593
19	9	"The Bear"	Jeremy Webb	Julia Ruchman	June 22, 2019	0.646
20	10	"Legend"	Dan Sackheim	Kevin Murphy	June 29, 2019	0.656

== Reception ==
The first season received mixed reviews among critics. On review aggregator website Rotten Tomatoes, the first season has an approval rating of 52% based on 27 reviews, with an average rating of 5.9/10. The site's critical consensus reads, "The Son's epic narrative and strong central performance are crippled by sluggish pacing, hasty direction, and superficial execution." On Metacritic, the series has a score of 57 out of 100, based 22 critics, indicating "mixed or average reviews".
