= Hemlock Grove (TV series) =

2013 American horror thriller television series

- Genre: Horror; Thriller
- Created by: Brian McGreevy
- Based on: Hemlock Grove by Brian McGreevy
- Developed by: Brian McGreevy; Lee Shipman
- Showrunners: Brian McGreevy; Lee Shipman
- Starring: Famke Janssen; Bill Skarsgård; Landon Liboiron; Penelope Mitchell; Kandyse McClure; Freya Tingley; Dougray Scott; Tiio Horn; Joel de la Fuente; Madeleine Martin; Madeline Brewer; Camille De Pazzis; Richard Gunn
- Composers: Nathan Barr; Todd Haberman
- Country of origin: United States
- Original language: English
- No. of seasons: 3
- No. of episodes: 33 (list of episodes)

Production
- Executive producers: Eli Roth; Charles H. Eglee; Eric Newman; Michael A. Connolly; Lee Shipman; Brian McGreevy; Deran Sarafian; Mark Verheiden; Peter Friedlander
- Production locations: Toronto, Ontario, Canada
- Running time: 45–58 minutes
- Production companies: Gaumont International Television; ShineBox SMC; United Bongo Drum, Inc.

Original release
- Network: Netflix
- Release: April 19, 2013 – October 23, 2015

Hemlock Grove is an American horror television series produced by Eli Roth and developed by Brian McGreevy and Lee Shipman. It is a production of Gaumont International Television. The series is based on McGreevy's 2012 novel of the same name. The series premiered on Netflix on April 19, 2013, with all 13 episodes made immediately available for online viewing.

The show examines the strange happenings in Hemlock Grove, a fictional town in Pennsylvania. Roman Godfrey, heir to the town's wealthy Godfrey family, befriends the town's newcomer, Peter Rumancek. Recent brutal murders in the town have stirred up rumors, and the two work together to shed light on the case while also hiding their own dark secrets.

On June 19, 2013, Netflix renewed Hemlock Grove for a second season of 10 episodes, to air in 2014. On July 18, 2013, Netflix earned the first Primetime Emmy Award nominations for original online-only streaming television at the 65th Primetime Emmy Awards in 2013. Three of its online original series—Arrested Development, Hemlock Grove, and House of Cards—earned nominations.

The second season premiered on July 11, 2014. On September 2, 2014, Netflix renewed it for a third and final 10-episode season, which premiered on October 23, 2015.

Netflix announced on September 21, 2022 that all three seasons of Hemlock Grove will be removed from the service on October 22, 2022.

In November 2022, it was announced that FilmRise had acquired the streaming rights to the series.

== Plot ==
The series is set in the town of Hemlock Grove, Pennsylvania. The town is a mixture of extreme wealth and poverty, as the closing of the town's steel mill many years earlier caused many to lose their jobs. The town's main sources of employment are now the Godfrey Institute for Biomedical Technologies and Hemlock Acres Hospital. Heading the Institute—which is rumored to conduct sinister experiments on a daily basis—is the imposing Olivia Godfrey (Famke Janssen), while Hemlock Acres' lead psychiatrist is her brother-in-law, Dr. Norman Godfrey (Dougray Scott).

As season one opens, the town's rumor mill turns even more twisted, as two teenage girls are brutally killed and their bodies left for unsuspecting people to find the next day. Peter Rumancek (Landon Liboiron) a 17-year-old Didicoy, is suspected of the crimes by some of the townsfolk; he is rumored to be a werewolf, which he secretly is. He sets out to solve the mystery of the murders with help from the troubled Roman Godfrey (Bill Skarsgård), heir to the Godfrey estate.

Rounding out the main cast of characters of the first season are Norman's daughter (Roman's cousin), the beautiful Letha Godfrey (Penelope Mitchell) who claims the father of her unborn child is an angel from Heaven, and Christina Wendall (Freya Tingley), a lonely girl who becomes interested in Peter.

For season two, two former supporting characters were promoted to the main cast of characters: Peter's con-artist older cousin Destiny (Tiio Horn), who makes her living as a psychic medium, and Dr. Johann Pryce (Joel de la Fuente), the lead scientist of the Godfrey Institute, a brilliant but ruthless man of science, gifted with super-strength. A cult has arisen that is bent on destroying the supernatural creatures in Hemlock Grove by any means necessary. To make matters worse, both Peter and Roman struggle with their nature, as Peter risks becoming the same killer from the first season and Roman, after his full immersion with his true nature in the first season, has developed an insatiable hunger to kill. As they fight their enemies and deal with their situations, they must also deal with the monsters they are becoming, or have already become.

Season	Episodes	Originally released
1	13	April 19, 2013
2	10	July 11, 2014
3	10	October 23, 2015

== Cast ==
=== Main ===
- Famke Janssen as Olivia Godfrey
- Bill Skarsgård as Roman Godfrey
- Landon Liboiron as Peter Rumancek
- Penelope Mitchell as Letha Godfrey (season 1)
- Freya Tingley as Christina Wendall (season 1)
- Kaniehtiio Horn as Destiny Rumancek (season 2–3; recurring season 1)
- Joel de la Fuente as Dr. Johann Pryce (season 2–3; recurring season 1)
- Dougray Scott as Dr. Norman Godfrey (season 1–2)
- Nicole Boivin (recurring season 1) and Madeleine Martin (season 3; recurring season 2) as Shelley Godfrey, Roman's heavily deformed but good-hearted sister. While Boivin and Martin are the main actresses portraying the character, Shelley's remarkably large figure is provided, when seen from a distance, by Amazon Eve for the first five episodes, and by Michael Andreae thereafter.
- Camille De Pazzis as Annie Archambeau (season 3)

=== Recurring ===
- Lili Taylor as Lynda Rumancek, Peter's mother and confidant (season 1–2)
- Laurie Fortier as Marie Godfrey, Norman's wife, and the mother of Letha (season 1–2)
- Kandyse McClure as Dr. Clementine Chasseur, a mysterious woman arriving in Hemlock Grove to investigate the killings (season 1)
- Aaron Douglas as Tom Sworn, the sheriff of Hemlock Grove (season 1)
- Ted Dykstra as Francis Pullman, the "village idiot", who claims to have witnessed unspeakable things (season 1)
- Demore Barnes as Michael Chasseur, Clementine's brother
- Luke Camilleri as Andreas Vasilescu (season 2–3)
- JC MacKenzie as Dr. Arnold Spivak (season 2–3)
- Madeline Brewer as Miranda Cates (season 2–3)
- Shauna MacDonald as Dr. Galina Zheleznova-Burdukovskaya (formerly Alyona Potyomkina-Zosimova), a brilliant Russian scientist working under Dr. Pryce (season 2)
- Alex Hernandez as Isaac Ochoa, a private detective (season 3)
- Richard Gunn as Aitor Quantic (season 3)
- Emmanuel Kabongo as Marshall (season 3)
- Michael Therriault as Dr. Klaus Blinsky (season 3)
- Anthony J. Mifsud as Greek Delivery man (season 3)
- Meegwun Fairbrother as Milan Faber (season 3)

=== Guest ===
- Eliana Jones and Emilia McCarthy as Alexa and Alyssa Sworn, Sheriff Sworn's twin daughters, and Christina's best friends
- Holly Deveaux as Jenny Fredericks, a local convenience store clerk
- Don Francks as Nicolae Rumancek, Peter's deceased grandfather. Seen in flashbacks.
- Philip Craig as the Bishop, a contact of Clementine's
- Alanis Peart as Mrs. Pisarro, Peter's and Roman's English teacher
- Emily Piggford as Ashley Valentine, a schoolmate of Roman's who develops a crush on him
- Jacqueline Graham as Lisa Willoughby, a local girl who becomes the second murder victim
- Paul Popowich as JR Godfrey, Roman's deceased father, husband of Olivia, and brother of Norman. Seen in flashbacks
- Landon Norris as Tyler, a fellow schoolmate, with a romantic interest in Christina
- Joe Bostick as Vice Principal Spears, the vice principal of the local high school
- Lorenza Izzo as Brooke Bluebell, a local girl, whose brutal murder opens the series
- Marty Adams, William deVry, Jasmin Geljo, Ashleigh Harrington and Dylan Trowbridge portray the town's Deputy Sheriffs, nicknamed respectively Neck, Chin, Moustache, Lips, and Nose

== Development and production ==
In December 2011, Deadline Hollywood reported that Netflix and Gaumont International Television were finalizing a deal for a 13-episode series order for Hemlock Grove. The project was officially announced in March 2012. Eli Roth serves as an executive producer and will direct the pilot, Jellyfish In the Sky. Deran Sarafian, who signed on in mid-March as an executive producer/series director, directed six episodes.

After McGreevy pushed for the series to be filmed in the Pittsburgh area, production was expected to start in early June 2012 and last until November. In mid May, Gaumont International Television pulled out of Pennsylvania in favor of production at the Cinespace Film Studios in Toronto. The move came about after Gaumont management had a misunderstanding on how the Pennsylvania Film Tax Credit program works. Filming began on July 13, 2012 in Port Perry, Ontario; a small town about 40 miles (63 km) northeast of Toronto that has been transformed to look like Hemlock Grove, the fictional Western Pennsylvania town the series is set in.

The budget for the first season of Hemlock Grove is reportedly about $45 million.

Filming took place in Toronto at St Clair and Yonge at the Deer Park United Church and in Hamilton, Ontario at Hamilton Cemetery. Hemlock Grove High School was filmed at Ursula Franklin Academy/ Western Technical Commercial School in Toronto. It was also filmed in Oshawa at the Parkwood Estate; the opening scene of Season 1, Episode 1 is on Queen Street in Port Perry, Ontario.

=== Casting ===
In March, Netflix announced that Famke Janssen and Bill Skarsgård would star in the series, Janssen as Olivia Godfrey and Skarsgård as her son, Roman Godfrey. In early April 2012, it was revealed that Peter Rumancek would be portrayed by Landon Liboiron. On April 4, Penelope Mitchell was cast as Roman's cousin, Letha Godfrey. Freya Tingley was cast as Christina Wendall on April 10. On April 12, Dougray Scott was announced as Dr. Norman Godfrey, Olivia's brother-in-law and Letha's father. On July 2, Lili Taylor was cast as Peter Rumancek's mother, and Kandyse McClure was cast as Dr. Chasseur. Aaron Douglas was cast as Sheriff Sworn on July 8. In late July 2012, Kaniehtiio Horn joined the cast as Destiny Rumancek.

=== Music ===
The music for seasons 1 and 2 was composed by Nathan Barr. In October 2015, it was announced that Todd Haberman would join Barr to score season 3.

== Reception ==
=== Viewership ===
After its opening weekend, Netflix announced that Hemlock Grove was viewed by more members globally in its first weekend than House of Cards.

=== Critical reception ===
The first season of Hemlock Grove received "mixed or average" reviews, according to Metacritic, with a score of 45 out of 100. On Rotten Tomatoes, the season has a rating of 26%, based on 34 reviews, and the average rating is 4.68/10. The site's critical consensus reads, "Hemlock Grove is an ugly, unpleasant affair that throws crazy ideas together without much forethought."

The second season received "generally unfavorable" reviews, according to Metacritic, with a score of 37 out of 100. Rotten Tomatoes gives the season a rating of 55%, based on 11 reviews, and the average rating is 5.29/10. The site's consensus reads: "Hemlock Grove jettisons some of its most grating qualities while doubling down on its splashy gore, making for a more engaging second season – but the series frustratingly remains a shoddy amalgamation of gothic tropes."

Mary McNamara of the Los Angeles Times called Hemlock Grove "terrible", and Alison Willmore of IndieWire, "a mess". Zack Handlen of The A.V. Club gave the series an F, calling it "a shockingly inane misstep, a ponderous mess." Dante D'Orazio of The Verge said the show was "universally panned" on account of its "poor acting, slow plot development, and ... style that's off-key." Patrick Smith of The Daily Telegraph said that Hemlock Grove was "corny and emphatically less profound than it thinks it is", giving it two out of five stars overall. James Poniewozik of Time listed the series as one of the worst ten things on television in 2013.

On the other hand, David Hiltbrand of the Philadelphia Inquirer said that the show "manages to be lush, gross, frightening, and ridiculous--all at the same time." Tom Gliatto of People Weekly reviewed the series positively, with a score of 75 out of 100: "The acting is good, especially Bill Skarsgard and Landon Liboiron.... I like the show's languid, dreamlike beauty, but horror fans may be less patient." Jessica Shaw of Entertainment Weekly gave the series a B+.

=== Accolades ===
Hemlock Grove received two nominations for Outstanding Main Title Theme Music and Primetime Emmy Award for Outstanding Special Visual Effects at the 65th Primetime Creative Arts Emmy Awards, but lost to Da Vinci's Demons and Game of Thrones, respectively.

Year	Award	Category	Nominee(s)	Result	Ref.
2013	Primetime Creative Arts Emmy Awards	Outstanding Original Main Title Theme Music	Nathan Barr	Nominated	
2013	Primetime Creative Arts Emmy Awards	Outstanding Special Visual Effects	Episode:"Children of the Night"	Nominated	
2014	Visual Effects Society Awards	Outstanding Visual Effects in a Visual Effects-Driven Photoreal/Live Action Broadcast Program	Matt Whelan, Chris Brown; Todd Masters, Jonathan Banta; Eric McAvoy	Nominated	

== See also ==
- Werewolf fiction
- List of vampire television series
