= Number One Fan (film) =

- Film poster
- Directed by: Jeanne Herry
- Written by: Jeanne Herry; Gaëlle Macé
- Produced by: Alain Attal; Hugo Sélignac; Sophie Tepper
- Starring: Sandrine Kiberlain; Laurent Lafitte
- Cinematography: Axel Cosnefroy
- Edited by: Francis Vesin
- Music by: Pascal Sangla
- Production companies: Les Productions du Trésor; Chi-Fou-Mi Productions; StudioCanal; TF1 Films Production; Egérie Productions
- Distributed by: StudioCanal
- Release dates: 18 June 2014 (Shanghai); 24 September 2014
- Running time: 105 minutes
- Country: France
- Language: French
- Budget: $7 million
- Box office: $3.7 million

Number One Fan (French: Elle l'adore) is a 2014 French comedy-drama film written and directed by Jeanne Herry and starring Sandrine Kiberlain and Laurent Lafitte.

== Plot ==
Vincent Lacroix is a successful singer, one of those who have everything going for them, glory, love, money. For twenty years, Muriel, an eccentric esthetician and somewhat mythomaniac, has had eyes only for him. She hasn't missed any of his concerts, watches all his appearances and buys everything he produces. One evening, Vincent's life gets out of hand. During an argument, he accidentally kills his partner. To Muriel's shock, he comes knocking on her door.

== Cast ==
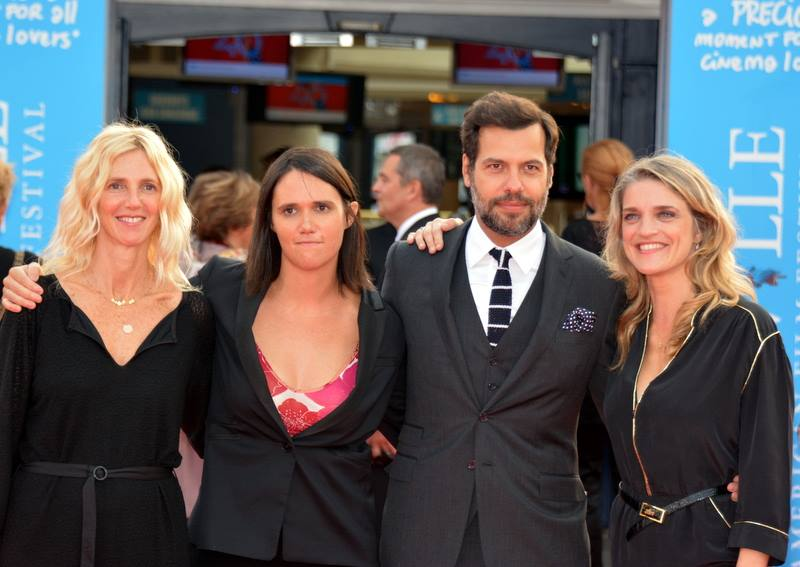
Sandrine Kiberlain, director Jeanne Herry, Laurent Lafitte and Olivia Côte at the 2014 Deauville American Film Festival.

- Sandrine Kiberlain as Muriel Bayen
- Laurent Lafitte as Vincent Lacroix
- Pascal Demolon as Antoine
- Olivia Côte as Coline
- Nicolas Bridet as Nicolas
- Sébastien Knafo as Sébastien
- Muriel Mayette as Arlette
- Benjamin Lavernhe as Guillaume
- Hélène Alexandridis as Dabert
- Michèle Moretti as Nicole
- Sarah Megan Allouch as Marie
- Jolan Maffi as Thomas
- Lou Lesage as Julie
- Sharif Andoura as Etienne
- Florence Viala as Louise
- Blanche Duhem as Suzanne
- Émilie Gavois-Kahn as Poker player
- Michel Drucker as Himself

== Accolades ==
Award / Film Festival	Category	Recipients and nominees	Result
César Awards	Best Actress	Sandrine Kiberlain	Nominated
César Awards	Best First Feature Film		Nominated
Deauville American Film Festival	Prix Michel d’Ornano	Jeanne Herry	Won
2014 Festival du film francophone d'Angoulême	Best Actress	Sandrine Kiberlain	Won
Globes de Cristal Award	Best Actress	Sandrine Kiberlain	Nominated
Lumière Awards	Best Actress	Sandrine Kiberlain	Nominated
Lumière Awards	Best First Film		Nominated
Lumière Awards	Best Screenplay	Jeanne Herry and Gaëlle Macé	Nominated
