= Thicker Than Blood (film) =

1998 film by Richard Pearce

- Film poster
- Written by: Bill Cain
- Directed by: Richard Pearce
- Starring: Mickey Rourke; Dan Futterman; Carlo Alban; Lauren Vélez; Josh Mostel; Rosanna DeSoto
- Music by: Mark Adler
- Original language: English

Production
- Producer: Michael Hausman
- Cinematography: Nancy Schreiber
- Editor: Mark Warner
- Running time: 95 minutes
- Production companies: Sarabande Productions; TNT

Original release
- Release: 1998

Thicker Than Blood is a 1998 American made for TV drama film directed by Richard Pearce and starring Mickey Rourke, Dan Futterman and Carlo Alban. It won an ALMA Award for Outstanding Made-for-Television Movie or Mini-Series in 1999.

== Synopsis ==
Griffin Byrne is a newly assigned teacher to a Catholic high school in an inner-city near slum neighbourhood of New York, which is run down by headmaster Father Frank Larkin. There, he meets and tries to help Lee Cortez, a smart boy from a poor and troubled family. Lee has a good heart and artistic skills, but is constantly dragged down by his social environment and about to leave the school. Byrne's struggle to help Lee reflects the struggles and difficulties which the school is being subjected to every day.

== Cast ==
- Dan Futterman as Griffin Byrne
- Mickey Rourke as Father Frank Larkin
- Carlo Alban as Lee Cortez
- Lauren Vélez as Camilla Lopez
- Josh Mostel as Kendall
- Peter Maloney as James
- Vincent Laresca as Tyro
- Rosanna DeSoto as Señora
- Dick Latessa as Ciccilone
- Grace Garland as Hooker
- Brandon Segarra as Alberto
- Frances Conroy as Mrs. Byrne
- Steve Ryan as Mr. Byrne
