= Urbania (film) =

- Directed by: Jon Shear; Philippe Denham
- Written by: Daniel Reitz (play and screenplay); Jon Shear (screenplay)
- Produced by: Mark V. Dziak; J. Todd Harris; Stephanie Golden
- Starring: Dan Futterman; Paige Turco; Samuel Ball; Josh Hamilton; Matt Keeslar; Alan Cumming
- Cinematography: Shane F. Kelly; Peter Konczal; Ronnie Dennis
- Edited by: Randy Bricker; Ed Marx
- Music by: Marc Anthony Thompson
- Distributed by: Lions Gate Films
- Release dates: January 24, 2000 (Sundance Film Festival); September 25, 2000 (limited)
- Running time: 103 minutes
- Country: United States
- Language: English
- Budget: $225,000
- Box office: $1 million

Urbania is a 2000 independent drama film based on the play Urban Folk Tales. It was nominated for the Grand Jury Prize at the 2000 Sundance Film Festival, then played the Toronto International Film Festival, the Seattle International Film Festival, and a number of LGBT film festivals, winning a total of 6 "Best Film" awards. It was released by Lionsgate and was named "One of the Year's Best Films" in over 35 publications including the Los Angeles Times, Time Out, the Chicago Tribune, and the San Francisco Chronicle.

== Plot ==
Urbania follows Charlie through a sleepless night. After an unsuccessful bout of masturbation to the sound of his upstairs neighbors having sex, he prowls the streets looking for a man he saw several months earlier. The implication is that he has had a one night stand with the man, cheating on his boyfriend Chris. This is reinforced by several phone calls Charlie places, leaving messages on Chris's answering machine. As he is walking, he has momentary flashes akin to hallucinations or waking dreams: a man's mouth; a bottle breaking; a man with a blood-stained shirt.

After a series of encounters (with his upstairs neighbors, whom he tells about his masturbatory activities; and with a potential sex partner), he meets the man he is looking for. His name is Dean and it makes no sense either that he would have sex with Charlie or that Charlie would have sex with him. Dean is unabashedly racist, sexist and homophobic. Nevertheless, Charlie, pretending to be straight, buys Dean drinks and smokes a joint with him. Dean takes Charlie to a gay cruising area looking for victims, but Charlie is able to warn away the intended target. Dean is now almost incapacitated by alcohol and drugs and Charlie gets him into Dean's car and drives him to a secluded marshy area.

As had been implied by Charlie's flashbacks, Dean and two of his buddies, several months earlier, had attacked Charlie and raped and murdered Chris in an apparent hate crime. Charlie's purpose is finally revealed: he wants revenge.

In a dreamlike conversation with Chris, Charlie relates what happened at the marshland. He pulled a knife on Dean and told him why he was there. Dean did not remember him. Charlie forced Dean to drop his pants and was disgusted to see Dean had an erection. Charlie forced Dean to kneel and fellate the knife blade. Suddenly, Dean collapsed with an epileptic seizure. Charlie slit his throat.

Chris challenges Charlie, not believing that he killed Dean. Charlie admits that he wanted to but could not. Instead, he drove off in Dean's car, abandoning him in the marsh.

Charlie stands up from where he has been kneeling, at a makeshift memorial near where Chris was killed. He walks home and has one more hallucinatory flash. He sees himself on the street, cradling a dying Chris. He kisses Chris goodbye and passes by him. When he turns back, Chris is gone. Charlie makes it home and, finally, is able to sleep.

Charlie presents aspects of his story in the form of urban legends. The film references a number of urban legends, both by having characters describe them as they are depicted and by presenting random people experiencing them.

== Cast ==
- Dan Futterman as Charlie
- Sam Ball as Dean (credited as Samuel Ball)
- Lothaire Bluteau as Bill
- Alan Cumming as Brett
- Josh Hamilton as Matt
- Matt Keeslar as Chris
- James Simon as Sam
- Megan Dodds as Deedee
- Gabriel Olds as Ron
- Barbara Sukowa as Clara, The Married Woman
- Gerry Bamman as Don
- Scott Denny as Ken
- Pamela Shaw as Judy, The Photo Lady
- David Wheir as Gary
- Christopher Bradley as Efraim, The Window Couple
- Brian Keane as Neil, The Window Couple
- Cheryl Brubaker as Pam (credited as Cheryl Brubacker)
- Marylouise Burke as Yvette, The Poodle Lady
- Bill Sage as Chuck
- Paige Turco as Cassandra
- Joe Daniel as Vin, One Night Stands
- Melinda Wade as Nadine, One Night Stands
- Sanjiv Jhaveri as Cassandra's Helper
- David T. Catapano as Frat Guy
- Paul Dawson as The Bloodied Man
- Rich Clayton as The Cashier

== Reception ==
Urbania has an approval rating of 72% on Rotten Tomatoes, based on 29 critic reviews. Metacritic, which uses a weighted average, assigned the film a score of 73 out of 100, based on 24 critics, indicating "generally favorable" reviews.

== Awards and nominations ==
- L.A. Outfest Grand Jury Award, Outstanding American Narrative Feature (winner) - 2000
- Philadelphia International Gay & Lesbian Film Festival Jury Prize, Best Feature (winner) - 2000
- Provincetown International Film Festival Audience Award Best Feature (winner) - 2000
- San Francisco International Lesbian & Gay Film Festival Best First Feature (winner) - 2000
- Seattle International Film Festival Golden Space Needle Award, Best Actor, Dan Futterman (winner) - 2000
- Sundance Film Festival Grand Jury Prize, Dramatic (nominated) - 2000
- GLAAD Media Awards Outstanding Film (Limited Release) (nominated) - 2001

== DVD release ==
Urbania was released on Region 1 DVD on March 13, 2001.
