= Saar Klein =

Israeli-American film editor and director

- סער קליין
- Born: 1967 (age 58–59); Jerusalem, Israel
- Occupations: Film editor, film director

Saar Klein (Hebrew: סער קליין; born 1967) is an Israeli-American film editor and director, who has been nominated for two Academy Awards for Best Film Editing for The Thin Red Line and for Almost Famous, and who received an ACE Eddie Award for editing the latter one.

== Early life ==
Klein was born in Jerusalem, Israel, to a family of Jewish descent. He immigrated to the United States with his parents at the age of 9. In 1989, Klein received a bachelor's degree in psychology from Vassar College in Poughkeepsie, New York.

== Career ==
Klein was offered an internship with editor Joe Hutshing on the film JFK (directed by Oliver Stone-1991); his first editing credit (as an apprentice to editors David Brenner and Sally Menke) was for the 1993 film Heaven & Earth (directed by Oliver Stone). The Thin Red Line, which was nominated for an editing Academy Award, was only his second credit as an editor. Klein shared this credit with Leslie Jones and Billy Weber; the film was directed by Terrence Malick. Klein and Joe Hutshing co-edited Almost Famous (2000), which was directed by Cameron Crowe.

Klein edited The Bourne Identity (directed by Doug Liman - 2002), which was the first in the series of films based on the novels of Robert Ludlum. Christopher Rouse, who worked as an additional editor on The Bourne Identity, edited the subsequent films that were directed by Paul Greengrass. Klein subsequently co-edited The New World (2005) (again with director Terrence Malick); Malick's films have typically used several editors. Klein recently edited Jumper (2008) (with director Doug Liman).

Klein has written and directed two short films, Nouveau Riche No. 11 and Nouveau Riche No. 34, which have been shown at several film festivals.

His directorial debut film After the Fall premiered in the Panorama section of the 64th Berlin International Film Festival in 2014.

== Filmography ==
Editor
Year	Film	Director	Notes
1996	For Which He Stands	Nelson McCormick	
1998	Endurance	Leslie Woodhead	
1998	The Thin Red Line	Terrence Malick	First collaboration with Terrence Malick
2000	Almost Famous	Cameron Crowe	
2002	The Bourne Identity	Doug Liman	First collaboration with Doug Liman
2005	The New World	Terrence Malick	Second collaboration with Terrence Malick
2008	Jumper	Doug Liman	Second collaboration with Doug Liman
2009	Fighting	Dito Montiel	
2014	After the Fall	Himself	
2018	Burden	Andrew Heckler	
2019	The Wolf's Call	Antonin Baudry	
2021	Locked Down	Doug Liman	Fifth collaboration with Doug Liman
2023	Asphalt City	Jean-Stéphane Sauvaire	
2024	The Instigators	Doug Liman	Seventh collaboration with Doug Liman
2025	Dead Man's Wire	Gus Van Sant	

Editorial department
Year	Film	Director	Role	Notes
1991	JFK	Oliver Stone	Post-production intern	First collaboration with Oliver Stone
1993	Heaven & Earth	Oliver Stone	Apprentice editor	Second collaboration with Oliver Stone
1994	The River Wild	Curtis Hanson	Apprentice editor	
1995	The Cure	Peter Horton	Associate editor	
1997	U Turn	Oliver Stone	Additional editor	Third collaboration with Oliver Stone
2006	The Elephant King	Seth Grossman	Supervising editor	
2008	Cadillac Records	Darnell Martin	Additional editor	
2010	Fair Game	Doug Liman	Additional editor	Third collaboration with Doug Liman
2011	Butter	Jim Field Smith	Additional editor	
2017	American Made	Doug Liman	Additional editor	Fourth collaboration with Doug Liman

Actor
Year	Film	Director	Role
1994	Floundering	Peter McCarthy	News Anchor

Additional crew
Year	Film	Director	Role
2014	Red Knot	Scott Cohen	Story consultant

Camera and electrical department
Year	Film	Director	Role
1994	Floundering	Peter McCarthy	Additional camera assistant

Director
Year	Film
2014	After the Fall

Producer
Year	Film	Director	Credit
2004	Undertow	David Gordon Green	Executive producer

Thanks
Year	Film	Director	Role	Notes
2009	The Butterfly Effect 3: Revelations	Seth Grossman	The filmmakers would like to thank	
2011	The Tree of Life	Terrence Malick	Special thanks	Third collaboration with Terrence Malick
2020	The Quarry	Scott Teems	Special thanks	
2021	Chaos Walking	Doug Liman	Special thanks	Sixth collaboration with Doug Liman
2023	Nyad	Elizabeth Chai Vasarhelyi; Jimmy Chin	Special thanks	

Writer
Year	Film
2014	After the Fall

Documentaries

Thanks
Year	Film	Director	Role
2023	American Symphony	Matthew Heineman	Special thanks

Shorts

Thanks
Year	Film	Director	Role
2012	Bored Games	Jonathan Fischer	Additional acknowledgments

TV movies

Editor
Year	Film	Director
1995	P.C.H.	Nelson McCormick

Editorial department
Year	Film	Director	Role
1997	Sub Down	Gregg Champion	Additional editor

TV series

Editor
Year	Title	Notes
2024	Masters of the Air	1 episode

== Accolades ==
Year	Award	Category	Work	Result
1999	Academy Awards	Best Film Editing	The Thin Red Line	Nominated
1999	American Cinema Editors	Best Edited Feature Film	The Thin Red Line	Nominated
2001	Academy Awards	Best Film Editing	Almost Famous	Nominated
2001	American Cinema Editors	Best Edited Feature Film – Comedy or Musical	Almost Famous	Won
