= After the Fall (2014 film) =

2014 film directed by Saar Klein

- Film poster
- Directed by: Saar Klein
- Written by: Saar Klein; Joe Conway
- Starring: Wes Bentley; Jason Isaacs; Vinessa Shaw
- Cinematography: Matthias Koenigswieser
- Edited by: Hank Corwin; Saar Klein
- Music by: Marc Streitenfeld
- Release dates: February 9, 2014 (Berlin); December 12, 2014 (US)
- Running time: 110 minutes
- Country: United States
- Language: English

After the Fall, originally titled Things People Do, is a 2014 American drama film directed by Saar Klein and starring Wes Bentley, Jason Isaacs, and Vinessa Shaw. The film had its premiere in the Panorama section of the 64th Berlin International Film Festival. The film had its premiere in theaters and VOD on December 12, 2014. The film received negative reviews.

== Cast ==
- Wes Bentley as Bill Scanlon
- Haley Bennett as Ruby
- Vinessa Shaw as Susan Scanlon
- Jason Isaacs as Frank McTiernan
- Keith Carradine as Charles
- Sam Trammell as Lee
- W. Earl Brown
- Jeremiah Bitsui

== Reception ==
The film received generally negative reviews. The review aggregator website Rotten Tomatoes reported that 36% of critics have given the film a positive review based on 14 reviews. Robert Abele wrote in the Los Angeles Times that "the basic story’s narrative and psychological simplicity ... becomes an increasing burden." Stephen Holden wrote in The New York Times "After the Fall belongs to a type of movie that is too lazy to connect the dots and fill in the blanks between its supposedly teachable moments." However, Stephen Dalton, writing in The Hollywood Reporter, says that film, "has much to recommend, including gorgeous New Mexico landscapes, sumptuous digital cinematography and -- as we might expect from Klein -- virtuoso editing"
