= Dan Futterman =

American screenwriter and actor

- Born: Daniel Paul Futterman; June 8, 1967 (age 59); Silver Spring, Maryland, U.S.
- Education: Columbia University (BA)
- Occupations: Actor; screenwriter; producer
- Years active: 1991–present
- Spouse: Anya Epstein (m. 2000)
- Children: 2

Daniel Paul Futterman (born June 8, 1967) is an American actor, screenwriter, and producer.

Futterman wrote the screenplay for Capote, for which he received an Academy Award nomination, an Independent Spirit, Boston Society of Film Critics, and a Los Angeles Film Critics Association awards. He received a second Academy Award nomination for co-writing the script to Foxcatcher in 2014.

Futterman is also known for several acting roles, including Val Goldman in the film The Birdcage, and Vincent Gray on the CBS television series Judging Amy.

== Personal life ==
Futterman, one of three siblings, was born in Silver Spring, Maryland, the son of Linda (née Roth), a psychoanalyst, and Stanley Futterman, a lawyer. He was raised in Conservative Judaism in an "intellectual family". Futterman grew up in Larchmont, New York, and graduated from Mamaroneck High School in 1985 and Columbia University in 1989.

Futterman is married to television writer and producer Anya Epstein (sister of baseball executive Theo Epstein and granddaughter of Philip G. Epstein, Academy Award-winning screenwriter of Casablanca), with whom he has two daughters.

== Career ==
=== Actor ===
In 1991, Futterman landed his first stage role in the WPA production Club Soda. He also succeeded Joe Mantello as the voluble Louis Ironson in Tony Kushner's Tony award-winning play Angels in America on Broadway in 1993. Futterman portrayed an American diplomat's son who runs into trouble in South Africa in Jon Robin Baitz's A Fair Country (1996). He portrayed a slick card player with big dreams in Dealer's Choice (1997).

Futterman's first film role was as a thug who menaces Robin Williams in The Fisher King (1991). He appeared as a teacher in the romantic comedy Breathing Room/'Til Christmas (1996). Far Harbor/Mr. Spreckman's Boat (also 1996) was an ensemble piece which featured Futterman as a smarmy doctor in an interracial relationship. Also in 1996, he played Val, the son of gay lovers and nightclub owners Albert and Armand (again with Robin Williams) in The Birdcage. He appeared as the American half of a pair of twenty-something con artists in London in Shooting Fish (1997). He also had the leading role as a young gay man seeking revenge for the murder of his lover in the NYC-based thriller Urbania. He played Joe in the 2002 film Enough, with Jennifer Lopez, and murdered journalist Daniel Pearl in A Mighty Heart (2007) with Angelina Jolie.

Futterman has also made several guest appearances on primetime television. He costarred with Mickey Rourke as a teacher who clashes with a priest in Thicker Than Blood (TNT, 1998) and appeared alongside Ron Eldard and Martin Donovan in the World War II drama When Trumpets Fade (HBO, 1998). In 1999, Futterman leapt into a TV series, co-starring as the brother of the central character on the CBS series Judging Amy. Futterman also had a recurring role as the on-again, off-again boyfriend of one of the four sisters (Kiele Sanchez) on The WB drama Related. He also guest-starred in a four-episode story arc on the sitcom Will & Grace. Futterman was slated to appear in a recurring role on the new ABC drama Brothers & Sisters, also written by Jon Robin Baitz, but bowed out due to scheduling conflicts. He filmed an appearance alongside former "Birdcage" costar Calista Flockhart playing her fiancée, but that pilot version underwent massive rewrites and never aired. Previously, he also played a metrosexual man (pastry chef Stephan) on Sex and the City.

In 2012, he had a recurring role on the USA series Political Animals.

=== Writer ===
Futterman wrote the screenplay for Capote, and Futterman's friend Bennett Miller directed the film. Futterman and Miller graduated from Mamaroneck High School together and have been friends since 7th grade. The two recruited another old friend, actor Philip Seymour Hoffman, to star as Truman Capote, and began the process of getting the independent film made. Futterman and Hoffman were the film's executive producers. Futterman was recognized with several award nominations, including an Oscar nod for Best Adapted Screenplay.

In 2007, Futterman stated that he would focus on his writing career and was adapting the novel Everything Changes into a film script for Columbia Pictures.

From 2007 to 2010, Futterman and his wife, Anya Epstein, were writers and executive producers for the HBO drama series In Treatment.

In late 2009, Futterman and Epstein were in development with HBO to write and executive-produce a half-hour drama series called "T" about a trans man going through gender transition; it is based on a story from the radio show This American Life, and Ira Glass and Alissa Shipp of This American Life were slated to be executive producers as well. The series, scheduled as part of SundanceTV's 2013–2014 lineup, was to be written by Futterman and Epstein.

Futterman, with E. Max Frye, wrote the screenplay for another Miller-directed film, Foxcatcher (2014), a biographical drama film starring Steve Carell, Channing Tatum, and Mark Ruffalo. He and Frye were nominated for Best Original Screenplay at the 87th Academy Awards.

=== Producer ===
Futterman not only writes and acts in movies and on television, but often co-produces these projects as well. He has frequently written scripts and executive-produced alongside his wife, such as on the HBO series In Treatment. Futterman also adapted and produced a ten-part series for Fox, Gracepoint. Futterman, Lawrence Wright and Alex Gibney are executive producers of The Looming Tower for Hulu in 2018. He is the showrunner of the 2021 Showtime series American Rust.

== Filmography ==
=== Film ===
Writer

- Capote (2005) (also executive producer)
- Foxcatcher (2014)

Actor

Year	Title	Role
1991	The Fisher King	Second Punk
1991	Big Girls Don't Cry... They Get Even	Josh
1992	Passed Away	Tom
1996	The Birdcage	Val Goldman
1996	Breathing Room	David
1996	Far Harbor	Brad
1997	Shooting Fish	Dylan
1997	1999	Rufus Wild
2000	Urbania	Charlie
2002	Enough	Joe
2007	A Mighty Heart	Daniel Pearl
2012	Hello I Must Be Going	David
2014	Kill the Messenger	Leo Wolinsky

=== Television ===
Year	Title	Creator	Writer	Executive Producer	Notes
2010	In Treatment	No	Yes	Yes	7 episodes
2014	Gracepoint	No	Yes	Yes	10 episodes
2018	The Looming Tower	Yes	Yes	Yes	10 episodes
2021–2024	American Rust	Yes	Yes	Yes	19 episodes

Acting roles

Year	Title	Role	Notes
1992	Another World	Alan	
1995	New York News	Unknown	Episode: "New York News"
1997	Caroline in the City	Seth	Episode: "Caroline and the Cold Sesame Noodles"
1999–2005	Judging Amy	Vincent Gray	74 episodes
1999	Homicide: Life on the Street	Marcus Hume	Episode: "A Case of Do or Die"
1999	Sex and the City	Stephan	Episode: "Evolution"
2003	Will & Grace	Barry	4 episodes
2005–2006	Related	Danny	9 episodes
2012	Political Animals	Alex Davies	4 episodes

TV movies

Year	Title	Role
1991	Daughters of Privilege	Ballard Moss
1993	Class of '61	Shelby Payton
1993	Tracey Ullman Takes on New York	Peter Levine
1998	Thicker Than Blood	Griffin Byrne
1998	When Trumpets Fade	Doug Despin
2004	Gerald L'Ecuyer: A Filmmaker's Journey	

== Awards and nominations ==
Year	Title	Award/Nomination
1996	The Birdcage	Screen Actors Guild Award for Outstanding Performance by a Cast in a Motion Picture
2005	Capote	Boston Society of Film Critics Award for Best Screenplay; Independent Spirit Award for Best Screenplay; Nominated—Academy Award for Best Adapted Screenplay; Nominated—BAFTA Award for Best Adapted Screenplay; Nominated—Broadcast Film Critics Association Award for Best Writer; Nominated—Chicago Film Critics Association Award for Best Screenplay; Nominated—Satellite Award for Best Adapted Screenplay; Nominated—WGA Award for Best Adapted Screenplay
2014	Foxcatcher	Nominated—Academy Award for Best Original Screenplay; Nominated—WGA Award for Best Original Screenplay
