= Hemlock Grove =

2012 American horror-thriller novel

- Author: Brian McGreevy
- Cover artist: Rodrigo Corral
- Language: English
- Genre: Horror, Thriller
- Publisher: Farrar, Straus and Giroux
- Publication date: March 27, 2012 (paperback)
- Publication place: United States
- Media type: Print, e-book, audiobook
- Pages: 336 pp
- ISBN: 0374532915

Hemlock Grove is a 2012 horror-thriller debut novel by American author Brian McGreevy. The book was released on March 27, 2012 through Farrar, Straus and Giroux and is set in the fictional town of Hemlock Grove, Pennsylvania. A graphic novel tie-in and a television series based on the events in the book have been produced.

Critical reception for the book was mixed, with The New York Times giving an ambivalent review.

== Synopsis ==
The book is set in the town of Hemlock Grove, Pennsylvania. The town is a mixture of extreme wealth and poverty, as the closing of the town's steel mill (owned by the Godfrey family) many years earlier cost a lot of people their jobs. Now the town's main sources of employment are the Hemlock Acres Hospital and the Godfrey Institute for Biomedical Technologies. Run by the powerful Godfrey family, the institute is rumored to have several sinister experiments taking place within. The town's rumor mill turns even more twisted when a teenage girl is brutally killed during a full moon. Peter Rumancek, a 17-year-old Romanian gypsy boy who just moved to Hemlock Grove with his mother, is suspected of the crimes by some of the townsfolk and is also rumored to be a werewolf. While he secretly really is a werewolf, he is not the actual killer and along with Roman, the heir to the Godfrey estate (who Peter realizes is an upir, though Roman does not know it himself), they set out to find the killer.

The two become unlikely friends, much to the chagrin of each boy's mother. As the two grow closer, Roman's mother Olivia resumes an affair with her late husband's brother, Dr. Norman Godfrey. At several points during the novel Norman tries to break away from Olivia but ultimately fails due to his desire for her, despite him remembering several warnings from his brother about how Olivia emotionally preys on people. While Roman has known about the affair all along (but does not discuss it with anyone), his monstrous-looking, yet highly intelligent and kind sister Shelley becomes aware of the affair later. She openly says so in one of the e-mails she exchanges with her uncle Norman (on a regular basis since he is her therapist).

The murders continue in the town, and more people start to believe the teenage girl Christina who has been accusing Peter of being both a werewolf and the killer from the start. Christina also discovers the remains of one of the murdered girls, which seems to push her into insanity and causes her hair to turn white. Tensions continue to rise, especially after Peter begins a relationship with Roman's cousin Letha (Norman's daughter), who believes that she was recently impregnated by an angel. Their relationship ultimately breaks the friendship between Peter and Roman, prompting Roman to try to attack the Godfrey Institute and its lead scientist Dr. Pryce. Roman falls into a coma due to Pryce's attempt to keep him from harming Pryce or the experiment for Project Ouroboros. He later awakens and reconciles with Peter, just in time for them to launch another search for the killer. This fails due to Chasseur, a woman operating for a secret group known as the "Order of the Dragon", shooting a dart into Peter in his wolf form, knocking him out for the rest of the night of the full moon. During this time the twin daughters of the town sheriff are killed, which prompts a mob to ransack Peter's trailer. Neither Peter nor his mother are injured, as Peter is saved by Olivia interfering and Peter's mother was called away due to premonitions from a cousin.

Ultimately Chasseur is killed by Olivia (leaving the clean-up to Dr. Pryce) and Peter and Roman discover that the murderer is actually Christina, the girl who accused Peter of the murders. She turned herself into a werewolf by drinking water from one of the tracks left by Peter while he was in wolf form. Unable to control her actions as a werewolf or truly remember all that occurred, Christina's mental state deteriorated and caused her to become a "vargulf", an insane werewolf. Due to her insanity she attacked anyone she saw as being sexually promiscuous due to her own confusion over her burgeoning sexuality. Peter and Christina fight to the death in their wolf forms. Peter miraculously survives, but Shelley, who threw herself into the fight to avenge Christina's last victim, is shot by the Sheriff because he sees her holding Christina's (now human again) body. Shelley runs off, not to be seen again.

Six months after the fight, Letha goes into labor and dies in the process (the baby apparently being stillborn), leaving her father Norman distraught as well as prompting Peter and his mother to leave town since there was nothing truly holding them there. Being abandoned by Peter leaves Roman in an extremely emotional state. The final part of the book is told mostly from Olivia's point of view, revealing that centuries ago she was impregnated by a gypsy she tried to run away with as a young girl. The man abandoned her shortly after they escaped (taking her jewels with him), and she was found a few days later, bloody, from having cut off the tail she had (the origin of the scar on her lower back). She was brought home, and turned into an unnatural beauty over the course of her pregnancy. Now resentful of any gypsy, she gave up the child to grow up with a lowborn old swineherd named Rumancek, showing that the family is descended from Olivia. She also muses that while she married JR Godfrey, she fell in love with his brother Norman, who actually fathered Roman. At Roman's 18th birthday, Olivia takes him to Shelley's attic where he discovers Letha's (not actually stillborn) baby. With Olivia's extaz powers (which is the mind-controlling power Roman has used throughout the book too, without being taught), she makes her son remember that it was him who had sex with Letha (her mind having "made up" the "angel" to cope with this). Roman then slits his wrists to "not let his mother win" but this actually finishes his transformation; he grows fangs and it is insinuated that he drinks from Letha's - and his - baby.

== Development ==
McGreevy spent six years writing Hemlock Grove and the book was rejected by six publishers and eight agents before it was picked up by Farrar, Straus & Giroux in 2010. Of the writing process for the book, McGreevy stated that he was somewhat inspired by Angela Carter's The Bloody Chamber in that he saw that he "[doesn't] have to be trying to put myself in a box that I don't particularly have the talent for". McGreevy also drew from his experiences in high school and considers the book's setting as a Through the Looking Glass version of his hometown of Pittsburgh. He also commented that while the characters of Roman and Shelley were derived from the fictional characters of Mary Shelley's Frankenstein and Bram Stoker's Dracula, he drew more from the films based on these characters and from Greek mythology as a whole.

== Series development ==
=== Graphic novel ===
In March 2012 McGreevy released an online graphic novel set in the Hemlock Grove universe, entitled Hemlock Grove: Reflections on the Motive Power of Fire. The graphic novel is a prequel to the events in the main novel and focuses on the time leading up to the suicide of JR Godfrey. The graphic novel shows the building of the biotech facility as well as how Olivia met and seduced both Godfrey brothers. It also highlights Olivia's boredom and frustration with the utilitarian world of JR Godfrey, as well as gives some detail on the reanimation of Shelley.

=== Sequel ===
Shortly after the initial release of Hemlock Grove McGreevy commented that he had almost completed a second Hemlock Grove novel and had prepared an outline for a third entry in the series. However, in April 2013 McGreevy indicated in an article with the Toledo Blade that he had not yet begun writing any sequels to the book and later stated on Reddit that there were no plans for any further books in the series.

== Television series adaptation ==
In December 2011 it was reported that Netflix had ordered a thirteen episode series based upon Hemlock Grove, which was unreleased at that point in time. The project was officially announced in March 2012 and Eli Roth was announced to be directing. Filming was initially set to take place in the Pittsburgh area, but was later moved to Toronto due to misunderstandings with the Pennsylvania Film Tax Credit program. The show was released to Netflix on April 19, 2013 and stars Famke Janssen, Bill Skarsgård, and Landon Liboiron. In June 2013 Netflix confirmed that they would be renewing the show for a second season and in September 2014 they confirmed that the show had been picked up for a third and final season.
