= American Rust =

Novel by Philipp Meyer

- First Edition cover
- Author: Philipp Meyer
- Cover artist: Matthew Lenning
- Language: English
- Genre: Fiction, Novel
- Publisher: Spiegel & Grau
- Publication date: February 24, 2009
- Publication place: United States
- Media type: Print (hardcover)
- Pages: 367
- ISBN: 978-0-385-52751-4
- Dewey Decimal: 813.6
- LC Class: PS3613.E976

American Rust (2009) is a novel by American writer Philipp Meyer. It is set in the 2000s, in the fictional town of Buell in Fayette County, Pennsylvania, which is in a rural region referred to as "the Valley" of dilapidated steel towns. The novel focuses on the decline of the American middle class and well-paying manufacturing jobs, and the general sense of economic and social malaise. Meyer's novel received positive reviews, and many publications ranked it as one of the best novels of the year.

American Rust was published in 2009 in the United States, Great Britain, Australia, and The Netherlands (in Dutch); in 2010 it was published (in translation) in France, Germany, Italy, Korea, Israel, Greece, and Serbia.

== Writing style ==
American Rust is a third person, stream-of-consciousness work influenced, according to Meyer, by writers such as James Joyce, William Faulkner, Virginia Woolf, and James Kelman. Reviewers have compared it often to works by modernist writers: The Baltimore Sun compared it to Faulkner; Roger Perkins of The Daily Telegraph, Michiko Kakutani of The New York Times, and Ron Charles of The Washington Post all compared it to the works of Cormac McCarthy, Ernest Hemingway, John Steinbeck, and J.D. Salinger.

Geordie Williamson, head literary critic of The Australian, compared Meyer to Steinbeck in a radio interview, saying "Steinbeck is alive and well, and his name is Philipp Meyer." Williamson also compared Meyer to Sinclair Lewis and Nathaniel Hawthorne in the print edition of his review.

== Reception ==
=== Reviews ===
American Rust was released to general acclaim from book critics. Michiko Kakutani wrote for The New York Times: "'American Rust' announces the arrival of a gifted new writer — a writer who understands how place and personality and circumstance can converge to create the perfect storm of tragedy." Roger Perkins of The Telegraph called the novel "a terrifically impressive dissection of loyalty and honour." Michael Heaton of The Plain Dealer (Cleveland) praised Meyer's "gift for illuminating his tense, grim story with sparse but glittering detail." Vick Mickunas of Dayton Daily News wrote, "Novelists spend entire careers trying to write even one classic book. Philipp Meyer has accomplished that feat on his first attempt."

=== Accolades ===
Pittsburgh Post-Gazette, Idaho Statesman, The Economist, and Taylor Antrim of The Daily Beast all voted American Rust one of the best novels of 2009. The novel also won the 2009 Los Angeles Times Art Seidenbaum Award for First Fiction. It was a top-10 choice for The Washington Post, a top-100 choice for the Kansas City Star, and a New York Times Notable Book of 2009. Additionally, it was named one of Newsweek's "Best. Books. Ever." in July 2009.

== Plot ==
=== Characters ===
Isaac English: Nineteen year-old protagonist of American Rust. A recent high school graduate, who, despite his academic potential, does not attend college and has little hope for leaving his hometown or achieving economic mobility. Remains to help care for his elderly father. Becomes implicated in a murder at an old trainer plant, then resolves to ride the rails to Berkeley, California to become a student of physics with $4,000 stolen from his father's personal savings, but is ultimately unsuccessful and returns to Pennsylvania.

Billy Poe: Twenty-one year-old best friend of Isaac, former high school football star, though he does not share his friend's dedication to academics. Receives an opportunity for an athletic scholarship to play football at Colgate University, though declines. Becomes implicated in the aforementioned murder as he and Isaac try to leave Buell in the opening of the novel. Becomes incarcerated, sacrificing himself to allow Isaac to leave his hometown.

Lee English: Isaac's older sister who escapes their hometown to attend Yale University where she feels insecurity due to her social class and where she grew up. Lee lives in Connecticut and is married to the wealthy Simon, who does not appear directly in the novel. She also has an affair with Poe, whom she dated before she was married.

Grace Poe: Billy's mother, forty-one years old, who has an affair with Bud Harris, the local chief of police. Works as a seamstress, has a work-related repetitive stress injury in her hands. Fears that her job will be outsourced and that she will be reduced to working a minimum wage job.

Chief Dell Harris: Police chief who investigates the murder committed by Billy and Isaac and has an old relationship with Billy's mother Grace.

Steve Ho: Policeman and Harris's partner

Henry English: Father of Isaac and Lee. Old, sick, and wheelchair-ridden. Takes OxyContin at the conclusion of the novel to relieve some of his pain.

== Television adaptation ==
In November 2017, a television adaptation of American Rust was ordered to series by USA Network. The pilot episode was written by Brian McGreevy, Lee Shipman, and Philipp Meyer, and to be directed by David Gordon Green. The series was scrapped on January 25, 2018, after having trouble finding a leading actor for the show. In July 2019, the adaptation was recommissioned by Showtime. The series is written principally by Dan Futterman and stars Jeff Daniels as Harris; they both serve as executive producers. The series premiered on September 12, 2021.
