= Philipp Meyer =

American novelist

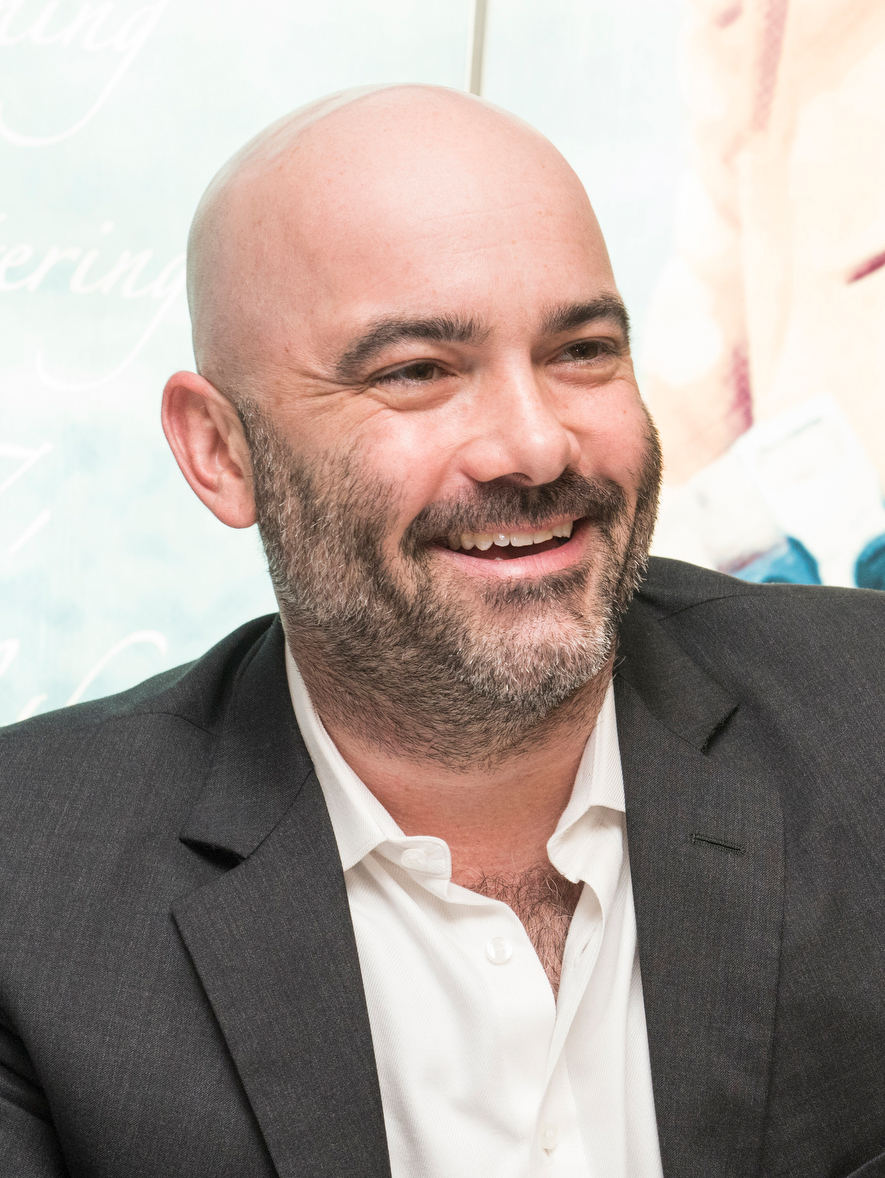
- Meyer in 2017
- Born: May 3, 1974 (age 52); New York City, US
- Education: Cornell University (BA); University of Texas, Austin (MFA)
- Occupation: Novelist
- Writing career
- Period: 2009–present
- Website: philippmeyer.net

Philipp Meyer (born May 3, 1974) is an American fiction writer and the author of the novels American Rust and The Son, as well as short stories published in The New Yorker and elsewhere. Meyer also created and produced the AMC television show based on his novel. He won the 2009 Los Angeles Times Book Prize, received a 2010 Guggenheim Fellowship and was a finalist for the 2014 Pulitzer Prize. He won the 2014 Lucien Barrière prize in France and the 2015 Prix Littérature-Monde Prize in France. In 2017 he was named a Chevalier (Knight) in France's Ordre des Arts et des Lettres.

Meyer considers his literary influences to be "the modernists, basically Woolf, Faulkner, Joyce, Hemingway, Welty, etc." Outlets such as the Wall Street Journal, Washington Post, New York Times, and the Telegraph have compared his writing to William Faulkner, Ernest Hemingway, Cormac McCarthy, and J. D. Salinger.

== Education ==
Meyer grew up in the Hampden neighborhood of Baltimore, Maryland. Hampden is a working-class neighborhood mostly known as the setting for many of John Waters's films. Meyer attended the Baltimore City Public Schools system, including Baltimore City College High School, until dropping out at age 16 and getting a GED. He spent the next five years working as a bicycle mechanic and occasionally volunteering at Baltimore's Shock Trauma Center.

At age 19, while taking college classes in Baltimore, Meyer decided to become a writer. He also decided to leave Baltimore and at 21, after several attempts at applying to elite colleges, was admitted to Cornell University. Meyer loved Cornell, feeling that “All of the sudden I wasn’t alone." During his time there, he wrote a 600-page novel that was never published, later calling it "self-indulgent undergrad nonsense". Meyer graduated with a degree in English and many years later received an MFA from the Michener Center for Writers at the University of Texas.

== Career ==
Meyer worked as a first responder for about 15 years, mostly part-time. In his early twenties he volunteered as an orderly at the R Adams Cowley Shock Trauma Center in downtown Baltimore. He served as a volunteer firefighter at fire departments in Maryland and upstate New York. He was one of the first outside EMTs to respond to Hurricane Katrina in 2005, driving his own vehicle to New Orleans and arriving on the day of the storm.

Meyer also spent a few years working on Wall Street. After graduating from college, he took a job with the Swiss investment bank UBS as a derivatives trader. He has called his experience there "soul-crushing" but also maintained friendships with many of his old colleagues.

After several years at UBS, Meyer committed to becoming a writer. He wrote a second novel that he could not get published, a book he has called "an apprentice-level work". He moved back into his parents' house in Baltimore, taking jobs driving an ambulance and as a construction worker. He was preparing for a long-term career as a paramedic when, in 2005, he received a fellowship at the Michener Center for Writers in Austin, Texas, where he wrote most of American Rust. Random House bought American Rust in 2008. During his time at the Michener Center, Meyer met fellow writer Kevin Powers, who later wrote the 2012 Iraq War novel The Yellow Birds.

In 2010, Meyer was named to The New Yorker's "20 under 40", its decennial list of 20 promising writers under the age of 40. His second novel, The Son, was published in 2013.

After the publication of The Son, Meyer decided to explore work in Hollywood as a sideline to writing books. He developed The Son as a television show and co-founded a production company (which was dissolved after a few years). In a 2023 interview with Ryan Holiday, Meyer said he found it almost impossible to balance working in television with writing books and that he had returned to writing books. He said he had spent most of the previous decade working on his third novel, The City.

AMC adapted The Son as a television series that ran for several seasons. Showtime and Amazon adapted American Rust into a television show. The second season premiered in 2024.

=== American Rust ===
Most of American Rust was written during Meyer's time at the Michener Center (2005–2008). In December 2007 the novel was acquired by Spiegel & Grau, a Random House imprint. American Rust was eventually acquired by publishers in 23 countries and translated into 17 languages. It is a third-person, stream-of-consciousness narrative influenced, according to Meyer, by writers such as James Joyce, William Faulkner, Virginia Woolf, and James Kelman.

American Rust was a winner of the Los Angeles Times Book Prize (2009). Reviewers in the UK's The Daily Telegraph, The Plain Dealer in Cleveland, and Dayton Daily News have suggested it fits the category of "Great American Novel".

=== The Son ===
While finishing American Rust, Meyer sought another subject through which he could explore what he felt was the "creation myth of America".

Meyer's original vision for The Son was quite different from the final novel; it originally featured "six or seven characters”, was "set in the present day", and "was conceived [...] as a book about the rise of a family dynasty and America’s relationship with war and violence." After two and a half years working on this version, Meyer realized that "these characters were talking about this legendary guy, and they were commenting on the American myth, in a way. And finally [...] it finally hit me that ... I needed the legendary character [Eli McCullough] in the book."

The inspiration for the revised novel grew out of recalling his time studying for his MFA at the University of Texas, during which Meyer became familiar with the so-called "Bandit War" of 1915–1918. He saw the potential for a novel about the Bandit Wars and the "creation myth of Texas" to explore broader historical issues about the development of America as a whole. After American Rust's publication, Meyer began to research Texas history more closely. He has estimated that he read 350 books about Texas history and diverse topics from captivity narratives to guides on bird tracks in the course of his composition of the novel. To gather historically accurate material, Meyer learned to tan deer hides, taught himself how to hunt with a bow, spent a month with military contractor Blackwater for firearms training, and shot a buffalo at a ranch so he could drink its blood, giving him a reference point for Comanche rituals.

With The Son, Meyer sought to write "a modernist take on the American creation myth. I didn't want the characters to be mythological figures, the way they're presented to us as kids in movies and in some books." The writing took five years.

The Son was published in May 2013. It was described in press releases as "an epic of Texas", with a plot about "three generations of a Texas family: Eli, his son Pete and Pete’s daughter Jeanne. Each face their own challenges—Comanche raiders, border wars and a changing civilization, respectively." Meyer called the work-in-progress a "partly historical novel about the rise of an oil and ranching dynasty in Texas, tracing the family from the earliest days of white settlement, fifty years of open warfare with the Comanche, the end of the frontier and the rise of the cattle industry, and transitioning into the modern (oil) age. The rise of Texas as a power pretty closely parallels America's rise to global power, for obvious reasons. And I wanted to write about the parts of America that are growing, rather than declining."

Meyer has said that he has conceived The Son as the second part of a trilogy of novels that began with American Rust.

The Son was a finalist for the Pulitzer Prize for Fiction and won the Lucien Barrière Prize and the Prix Littérature-Monde in France. It was also long listed for the International Dublin Literary Award.

=== The City ===
Meyer's third novel will be published in 2027, according to sources online. Meyer has described The City as his longest and most ambitious book, which took nearly ten years to write.

Meyer intended The City to be a modern take on Dante's Divine Comedy, with elements of magical realism, dystopian fiction, and science fiction. It takes place at the end of the world. Like his other novels, it has multiple points of view, interlocking stories, and stories within stories.

== Bibliography ==
=== Novels ===
- American Rust (2009)
- The Son (2013)

=== Short stories ===
- "You Are Right Here" Texas Observer Spring Books Issue, March 2011
- "What You Do Out Here, When You're Alone" The New Yorker, June 2010
- "Mother" Esquire UK, August 2009
- "The Wolf” The Iowa Review, Summer 2006
- “One Day This Will All Be Yours” McSweeney’s Issue 18, Winter/Spring 2006

== Awards and recognition ==
- 2009 Los Angeles Times Book Prize
- 2009 Center for Fiction First Novel Prize shortlist for American Rust
- 2010 Dobie Paisano Fellowship
- 2010 Guggenheim Fellowship
- 2010 New Yorker's "20 Under 40" list of upcoming writers
- 2011 International Dublin Literary Award longlist for American Rust
- 2013 Western Heritage Award for Books
- 2013 Writers League of Texas Book Award
- 2014 Pulitzer Prize for Fiction finalist for The Son
- 2014 Lucien Barrière Prize (France)
- 2015 Prix Littérature-Monde (France)
- 2015 International Dublin Literary Award longlist for "The Son"
- 2017 Chevalier (Knight) in France's Ordre des Arts et des Lettres.
