= Queer Palm =

LGBTQ film award

- Awarded for: Best LGBT-related film at the Cannes Film Festival
- Location: Cannes
- Country: France
- Presented by: Cannes Film Festival
- First award: 2010
- Website: https://www.queerpalm.org/

The Queer Palm is an independently sponsored prize for selected LGBTQIA+-relevant films entered into the Cannes Film Festival. The award was founded in 2010 by journalist Franck Finance-Madureira. It is sponsored by Olivier Ducastel and Jacques Martineau, filmmakers of Jeanne and the Perfect Guy, The Adventures of Felix, Crustacés et Coquillages, and L'Arbre et la forêt.

The award recognizes a film for its treatment of LGBT themes and selects from among those films nominated or entered under Official Selection, Un Certain Regard, Critics' Week, Directors' Fortnight and the ACID section.

== History ==
Along with Berlin's Teddy Award and Venice's Queer Lion, the Queer Palm is a major international film award dedicated specifically for LGBT cinema. However, the festival has faced some criticism for purportedly sidelining the award and not allowing it to become an official award of the festival organization.

Beginning in 2022, the Queer Palm also partnered with the Clermont-Ferrand International Short Film Festival to launch the Best Queer Short Award (Prix du Queer métrage) for the best LGBTQ-themed short film in that festival's program.

In 2026, the Queer Palm jury for the first time presented a Revelation Prize to honour the best film by a first-time director (the recipient being Pierre Le Gall's Flesh and Fuel), in addition to the established categories. In the same year, the Queer Palm partnered with Canada's Festival du nouveau cinéma to create the new Queer Louve award, which will be presented for the first time at the 2026 Festival du nouveau cinéma in lieu of the FNC's former Fierté Montréal-sponsored award for LGBTQ films.

== Winners ==
=== 2010s ===
Year	English Title	Original Title	Director(s)	Production Country
2010	Kaboom		Gregg Araki	United States, France
2010	108 Cuchillo de Palo	Cuchillo de palo	Renate Costa	Spain
2010	Heartbeats	Les Amours imaginaires	Xavier Dolan	Canada
2010	On Tour	Tournée	Mathieu Amalric	France, Germany
2011	Beauty	Skoonheid	Oliver Hermanus	South Africa
2011	Declaration of War	La Guerre est déclarée	Valérie Donzelli	France
2011	Kids of Today	Des jeunes gens mödernes	Jérôme de Missolz	France, Belgium
2011	Chatrak		Vimukthi Jayasundara	India
2011	My Little Princess		Eva Ionesco	France, Romania
2011	Old Cats	Gatos viejos	Pedro Peirano and Sebastián Silva	Chile
2011	Palawan Fate	Busong	Auraeus Solito	Philippines
2011	The Silver Cliff	O Abismo Prateado	Karim Aïnouz	Brazil
2011	The Skin I Live In	La piel que habito	Pedro Almodóvar	Spain
2011	Snowtown		Justin Kurzel	Australia
2011	Walk Away Renee		Jonathan Caouette	United States
2012	Laurence Anyways		Xavier Dolan	Canada
2012	Augustine		Alice Winocour	France
2012	Beyond the Hills	După dealuri	Cristian Mungiu	Romania
2012	Beyond the Walls	Hors les murs	David Lambert	Belgium, Canada, France
2012	For Love's Sake	愛と誠	Takashi Miike	Japan
2012	Hold Back	Rengaine	Rachid Djaïdani	France
2012	Holy Motors		Leos Carax	France, Germany
2012	The Invisibles	Les Invisibles	Sébastien Lifshitz	France
2012	Mystery	浮城謎事	Lou Ye	China
2012	Noor		Çağla Zencirci and Guillaume Giovanetti	India
2012	The Paperboy		Lee Daniels	United States
2012	Peddlers		Vasan Bala	India
2012	The We and the I		Michel Gondry	United States
2013	Stranger by the Lake	L'Inconnu du lac	Alain Guiraudie	France
2013	Behind the Candelabra		Steven Soderbergh	United States
2013	Blue Is the Warmest Colour	La Vie d'Adèle – Chapitres 1 & 2	Abdellatif Kechiche	France
2013	Bombay Talkies	Ajeeb Dastaan Hai Yeh	Karan Johar	India
2013	Me, Myself and Mum	Les Garçons et Guillaume, à table!	Guillaume Gallienne	France
2013	Opium		Arielle Dombasle	France
2013	Sarah Prefers to Run	Sarah préfère la course	Chloé Robichaud	Canada
2013	You and the Night	Les Rencontres d'après minuit	Yann Gonzalez	France
2014	Pride		Matthew Warchus	United Kingdom
2014	Breathe	Respire	Mélanie Laurent	France
2014	Darker Than Midnight	Più buio di mezzanotte	Sebastiano Riso	Italy
2014	Faire: L'amour		Djinn Carrénard	France
2014	A Girl at My Door	도희야	July Jung	South Korea
2014	Girlhood	Bande de filles	Céline Sciamma	France
2014	Love at First Fight	Les Combattants	Thomas Cailley	France
2014	Mommy		Xavier Dolan	Canada
2014	Party Girl		Marie Amachoukeli, Claire Burger and Samuel Theis	France
2014	Saint Laurent		Bertrand Bonello	France
2014	When Animals Dream	Når dyrene drømmer	Jonas Alexander Arnby	Denmark
2014	Whiplash		Damien Chazelle	United States
2014	Xenia	Ξενία	Panos H. Koutras	Greece, France, Belgium
2015	Carol		Todd Haynes	United States
2015	Amy		Asif Kapadia	United Kingdom
2015	Dope		Rick Famuyiwa	United States
2015	The Lobster		Yorgos Lanthimos	Ireland, United Kingdom, Greece, France, Netherlands
2015	Love		Gaspar Noé	France, Belgium
2015	Marguerite & Julien	Marguerite et Julien	Valérie Donzelli	France
2015	Much Loved	Zin Li Fik	Nabil Ayouch	Morocco, France
2015	Mustang		Deniz Gamze Ergüven	France, Germany, Turkey
2015	Pauline	Pauline s'arrache	Emilie Brisavoine	France
2015	Two Friends	Les deux amis	Louis Garrel	France
2015	Vanity	La Vanité	Lionel Baier	Switzerland, France
2015	The Wakhan Front	Ni le ciel, ni le terre	Clément Cogitore	France, Belgium
2015	Where There Is Shade	De l'ombre il y a	Nathan Nicholovitch	France
2016	The Lives of Thérèse	Les Vies de Thérèse	Sébastien Lifshitz	France
2016	Apnea	Apnée	Jean-Christophe Meurisse	France
2016	Aquarius		Kleber Mendonça Filho	Brazil
2016	Le Cancre		Paul Vecchiali	France
2016	The Dancer	La Danseuse	Stéphanie Di Giusto	France, Belgium, Czech Republic
2016	Divines		Uda Benyamina	France, Qatar
2016	Fiore		Claudio Giovannesi	Italy
2016	The Handmaiden	아가씨	Park Chan-wook	South Korea
2016	The Neon Demon		Nicolas Winding Refn	France, Denmark, United States
2016	Raw	Grave	Julia Ducournau	France, Belgium
2016	Slack Bay	Ma Loute	Bruno Dumont	France, Germany
2016	Staying Vertical	Rester vertical	Alain Guiraudie	France
2016	Willy 1er		Ludovic and Zoran Boukherma, Marielle Gautier and Hugo P. Thomas	France
2017	BPM (Beats per Minute)	120 battements par minute	Robin Campillo	France
2017	Coby		Christian Sonderegger	
2017	Golden Years	Nos années folles	André Téchiné	France
2017	How to Talk to Girls at Parties		John Cameron Mitchell	United States
2017	Marlina the Murderer in Four Acts	Marlina Si Pembunuh dalam Empat Babak	Mouly Surya	Indonesia
2017	The Prince of Nothingwood		Sonia Kronlund	
2017	They		Anahita Ghazvinizadeh	United States, Qatar
2018	Girl		Lukas Dhont	Belgium, Netherlands
2018	El Angel		Luis Ortega	Argentina, Spain
2018	Border	Gräns	Ali Abbasi	Sweden
2018	Carmen and Lola	Carmen y Lola	Arantxa Echevarria	Spain
2018	Cassandro the Exotico!		Marie Losier	France
2018	Diamantino		Gabriel Abrantes, Daniel Schmidt	Portugal, France, Brazil
2018	Euphoria	Euforia	Valeria Golino	Italy
2018	The Harvesters	Die Stropers	Etienne Kallos	South Africa
2018	Knife+Heart	Un couteau dans le cœur	Yann Gonzalez	France, Mexico, Switzerland
2018	Love Blooms	L'Amour debout	Michaël Dacheux	France
2018	Rafiki		Wanuri Kahiu	Kenya
2018	Sauvage		Camille Vidal-Naquet	France
2018	Shéhérazade		Jean-Bernard Marlin	France
2018	Sorry Angel	Plaire, aimer et courir vite	Christophe Honoré	France
2018	Whitney		Kevin Macdonald	United States, United Kingdom
2019	Portrait of a Lady on Fire	Portrait de la jeune fille en feu	Céline Sciamma	France
2019	Adam		Maryam Touzani	Morocco
2019	And Then We Danced	და ჩვენ ვიცეკვეთ	Levan Akin	Sweden, Georgia, France
2019	Bacurau		Kleber Mendonça Filho, Juliano Dornelles	Brazil, France
2019	Beanpole	Дылда	Kantemir Balagov	Russia
2019	Frankie		Ira Sachs	United States, France, Portugal
2019	Liberté		Albert Serra	France, Germany, Spain, Portugal
2019	Indianara		Aude Chevalier-Beaumel, Marcelo Barbosa	Brazil
2019	Matthias & Maxime		Xavier Dolan	Canada
2019	Oh Mercy!	Roubaix, une lumière	Arnaud Desplechin	France
2019	Pain and Glory	Dolor y gloria	Pedro Almodóvar	Spain
2019	Port Authority		Danielle Lessovitz	United States, France
2019	Rocketman		Dexter Fletcher	United States
2019	Tlamess		Ala Eddine Slim	Tunisia, France
2019	You Deserve a Lover	Tu mérites un amour	Hafsia Herzi	France
2019	Zombi Child		Bertrand Bonello	France

=== 2020s ===
Year	English title	Original title	Director(s)	Production country
2020	Award not presented due to the COVID-19 pandemic in France			
2021	The Divide	La Fracture	Catherine Corsini	France
2021	Anaïs in Love	Les Amours d'Anaïs	Charline Bourgeois-Tacquet	France
2021	Benedetta		Paul Verhoeven	France, Netherlands, Belgium
2021	Bruno Reidal	Bruno Reidal, Confession d'un meurtrier	Vincent Le Port	France
2021	Compartment No. 6	Hytti nro 6	Juho Kuosmanen	Finland, Estonia, Germany, Russia
2021	Everything Went Fine	Tout s'est bien passé	François Ozon	France
2021	Ghost Song		Nicolas Peduzzi	France
2021	Great Freedom	Große Freiheit	Sebastian Meise	Austria, Germany
2021	The Hill Where Lionesses Roar	Luaneshat e kodrës	Luàna Bajrami	France, Kosovo
2021	Moneyboys	金錢男孩	C. B. Yi	Taiwan, Austria, France, Belgium
2021	Neptune Frost		Saul Williams, Anisia Uzeyman	Rwanda, United States
2021	Paris, 13th District	Les Olympiades	Jacques Audiard	France
2021	Returning to Reims (Fragments)		Jean-Gabriel Périot	France
2021	Softie	Petite Nature	Samuel Theis	France
2021	Titane		Julia Ducournau	France, Belgium
2021	Venus by Water		Lin Wang	
2021	Women Do Cry	Жените наистина плачат	Vesela Kazakova, Mina Mileva	Bulgaria, France
2022	Joyland	جوائے لینڈ	Saim Sadiq	Pakistan
2022	The Blue Caftan	أزرق القفطان	Maryam Touzani	France, Morocco, Belgium, Denmark
2022	Burning Days	Kurak Günler	Emin Alper	Turkey, France
2022	Close		Lukas Dhont	Belgium, France, Netherlands
2022	Continental Drift (South)	La Dérive des continents (au sud)	Lionel Baier	Switzerland, France
2022	Diary of a Fleeting Affair	Chronique d'une liaison passagère	Emmanuel Mouret	France
2022	Dodo		Panos H. Koutras	Greece France, Belgium
2022	Feminist Riposte	Riposte féministe	Marie Perennès, Simon Depardon	France
2022	The Five Devils	Les Cinq Diables	Léa Mysius	France
2022	Forever Young	Les Amandiers	Valeria Bruni Tedeschi	France, Italy
2022	Irma Vep		Olivier Assayas	United States, France
2022	A Male	Un Varón	Fabián Hernández	Colombia, France, Germany, Netherlands
2022	Moonage Daydream		Brett Morgen	Germany, United States
2022	Pacifiction	Tourment sur les îles	Albert Serra	France, Spain, Portugal, Germany
2022	Rodeo	Rodéo	Lola Quivoron	France
2022	Tchaikovsky's Wife	Жена Чайковского	Kirill Serebrennikov	Russia, France, Switzerland
2022	Will-o'-the-Wisp	Fogo-Fatuo	João Pedro Rodrigues	Portugal, France
2023	Monster	怪物	Hirokazu Kore-eda	Japan
2023	Along Came Love	Le Temps d'aimer	Katell Quillévéré	France, Belgium
2023	Anatomy of a Fall	Anatomie d'une chute	Justine Triet	France
2023	Homecoming	Le Retour	Catherine Corsini	France
2023	How to Have Sex		Molly Manning Walker	United Kingdom, Greece, Belgium
2023	The Idol (series)		Sam Levinson	United States
2023	Kubi	首	Takeshi Kitano	Japan
2023	The Nature of Love	Simple comme Sylvain	Monia Chokri	Canada
2023	Power Alley	Levante	Lillah Halla	Brazil, France, Uruguay
2023	A Prince	Un prince	Pierre Creton	France
2023	Rosalie		Stéphanie Di Giusto	France, Belgium
2023	She Is Conann	Conann	Bertrand Mandico	France, Belgium
2023	A Song Sung Blue	小白船	Geng Zihan	China
2024	Three Kilometres to the End of the World	Trei Kilometri Pana La Capatul Lumii	Emanuel Pârvu	Romania
2024	Across the Sea	La mer au loin	Saïd Hamich Benlarbi	France, Morocco, Belgium, Qatar
2024	Baby		Marcelo Caetano	Brazil, France, Netherlands
2024	The Balconettes	Les Femmes au balcon	Noémie Merlant	France
2024	The Belle from Gaza	La Belle de Gaza	Yolande Zauberman	France
2024	Bird		Andrea Arnold	United Kingdom, France, Germany, United States
2024	Block Pass	La Pampa	Antoine Chevrollier	France
2024	Eat the Night		Caroline Poggi, Jonathan Vinel	France
2024	Emilia Pérez		Jacques Audiard	France
2024	Marcello Mio		Christophe Honoré	France, Italy
2024	Misericordia	Miséricorde	Alain Guiraudie	France, Spain, Portugal
2024	Most People Die on Sundays	Los domingos mueren más personas	Iair Said	Argentina
2024	Motel Destino		Karim Aïnouz	Brazil, France, Germany
2024	My Sunshine	ぼくのお日さま	Hiroshi Okuyama	Japan
2024	Queens of Drama	Les Reines du drame	Alexis Langlois	France, Belgium
2024	The Shameless		Konstantin Bojanov	India, Switzerland, France, Bulgaria, Taiwan
2024	To Live, To Die, To Live Again	Vivre, Mourir, Renaître	Gaël Morel	France
2024	Viet and Nam	Trong lòng đất	Truong Minh Quý	Vietnam, Philippines, Switzerland
2025
2025	The Little Sister	La Petite Dernière	Hafsia Herzi	France, Germany
2025	Alpha		Julia Ducournau	France, Belgium
2025	Drifting Laurent	Laurent dans le Vent	Anton Balekdjian, Léo Couture and Mattéo Eustachon	France
2025	Drunken Noodles		Lucio Castro	United States, Argentina
2025	Enzo		Robin Campillo	France, Italy, Belgium
2025	Her Will Be Done	Que ma volonté soit faite	Julia Kowalski	France, Poland
2025	The History of Sound		Oliver Hermanus	United Kingdom, United States
2025	I Only Rest in the Storm	O Riso e a Faca	Pedro Pinho	Portugal, Brazil, France, Romania
2025	Love Letters	Des preuves d’amour	Alice Douard	France
2025	Love Me Tender		Anna Cazenave Cambet	France
2025	The Mysterious Gaze of the Flamingo	La misteriosa mirada del flamenco	Diego Céspedes	Chile, France, Germany, Spain, Belgium
2025	Pillion		Harry Lighton	United Kingdom, Ireland
2025	The Richest Woman in the World	La femme la plus riche du monde	Thierry Klifa	France, Belgium
2025	Sorry, Baby		Eva Victor	United States
2025	A Useful Ghost	ผีใช้ได้ค่ะ	Ratchapoom Boonbunchachoke	Thailand, France, Singapore, Germany
2025	The Wave	La ola	Sebastián Lelio	Chile, United States
2026	Teenage Sex and Death at Camp Miasma		Jane Schoenbrun	United States
2026	Flesh and Fuel	Du Fioul dans les artères	Pierre Le Gall	France, Poland
2026	Another Day	Garance	Jeanne Herry	France, Belgium
2026	Bitter Christmas	Amarga Navidad	Pedro Almodóvar	Spain
2026	La bola negra		Javier Ambrossi and Javier Calvo	Spain, France
2026	Clarissa		Arie Esiri and Chuko Esiri	United States, Nigeria, Egypt
2026	Club Kid		Jordan Firstman	United States
2026	Coward		Lukas Dhont	Belgium, France
2026	Elephants in the Fog	तिनीहरू	Abinash Bikram Shah	Nepal, Germany, Brazil, France, Norway
2026	La Gradiva		Marine Atlan	France, Italy
2026	Jim Queen	Jim Queen à la Recherche de la Chloroqueer	Nicolas Athané and Marco Nguyen	France, Belgium
2026	The Man I Love		Ira Sachs	United States, France
2026	Mary Magdalene	Marie Madeleine	Gessica Généus	Haiti, France
2026	Marvelous Mornings	Les Matins Merveilleux	Avril Besson	France
2026	Nagi Notes	ナギダイアリー	Koji Fukada	Japan, Singapore, Thailand, France
2026	Roma Elastica		Bertrand Mandico	France, Italy
2026	A Secret Heart	Cœur Secret	Tom Fontenille	France
2026	Six Months in a Pink and Blue Building	Seis Meses en el Edificio Rosa con Azul	Bruno Santamaría Razo	Mexico, Denmark, Brazil
2026	Summer Drift	Virages	Céline Carridroit and Aline Suter	Switzerland, France
2026	Tangles		Leah Nelson	Canada, United States
2026	A Woman's Life	La Vie d'une Femme	Charline Bourgeois-Tacquet	France, Belgium

== Short films competition ==
=== 2010s ===
Year	English Title	Original Title	Director(s)
2012	It's Not a Cowboy Movie	Ce n'est pas un film de cow-boys	Benjamin Parent
2015	Lost Queens	Locas Perdidas	Ignacio Juricic Merillán
2015	The Fox Exploits the Tiger's Might		Lucky Kuswandi
2015	Kung Fury		David Sandberg
2015	Ramona		Andrei Cretulescu
2015	Rate Me		Fyzal Boulifa
2015	Sunday Lunch	Le Repas Dominical	Céline Devaux
2015	Victor XX		Ian Garrido López
2016	Gabber Lover		Anna Cazenave Cambet
2016	In the Hills		Hamid Ahmadi
2016	In the Year of the Monkey	Prenjak	Wregas Bhanuteja
2016	Superbia		Luca Tóth
2016	The Virgin Soldier	Le Soldat vierge	Erwan Le Duc
2017	Islands	Les Îles	Yann Gonzalez
2017	Bad Bunny	Coelho Mau	Carlos Conceição
2017	The Best Fireworks Ever	Najpiekniejsze fajerwerki ever	Aleksandra Terpinska
2017	Cherries	Trešnje	Dubravka Turić
2017	Heritage	Ben Mamshich	Yuval Aharoni
2017	Möbius		Sam Kuhn
2018	The Orphan	O Órfão	Carolina Markowicz
2018	Rubber Dolphin	Dolphin Megumi	Ori Aharon
2018	Sailor's Delight		Louise Aubertin, Éloïse Girard, Marine Meneyrol, Jonas Ritter, Loucas Rongeart, Amandine Thomoux
2018	Ultra Pulpe		Bertrand Mandico
2019	The Distance Between Us and the Sky		Vasilis Kekatos
2019	Complex Subject	Slozhnopodchinennoe	Olesya Yakovleva
2019	Grand Bouquet		Nao Yoshigai
2019	Jeremiah		Kenya Gillespie
2019	Journey Through a Body		Camille Degeye
2019	The Manila Lover		Johanna Pyykkö
2019	She Runs		Qiu Yan

=== 2020s ===
Year	English Title	Original Title	Director(s)	Production Country
2021	The Fall of the Swift	La Caída del vencejo	Gonzalo Quincoces	Spain
2021	Frida		Aleksandra Odić	Germany
2021	Billy Boy		Sacha Amaral	Argentina
2021	Brutalia, Days of Labour		Manolis Lavris	Greece, Belgium
2021	Cicada		Yoon Daewoen	South Korea
2021	King Max		Adèle Vincenti-Crasson	France
2021	On Solid Ground	Über Wasser	Jela Hasler	Switzerland
2021	The Right Words	Haut les cœurs	Adrian Moyse Dullin	France
2021	Simone Is Gone	Simone est partie	Mathilde Chavanne	France
2022	Will You Look at Me	当我望向你的时候	Shuli Huang	China
2022	Aribada		Simon(e) Jaikiriuma Paetau, Natalia Escobar	
2022	Burial of Life as a Young Girl	Des jeunes filles enterrent leur vie	Maïté Sonnet	
2022	Fire at the Lake	Le Feu au lac	Pierre Menahem	France
2022	Hideous		Yann Gonzalez	
2022	The Melting Creatures	Les Créatures qui fondent au soleil	Diego Céspedes	
2022	Mumlife		Ruby Challenger	Australia
2022	On Xerxes' Throne	Sur le trône de Xerxès	Evi Kalogiropoulou	
2022	The Pass		Pepi Ginsberg	United States
2022	Persona	각질	Sujin Moon	South Korea
2022	The Silent Whistle	Feng Zheng	Li Yingtong	United States
2022	Swan in the Centre	Swan dans le centre	Iris Chassaigne	
2023	Bolero		Nans Laborde-Jourdàa	France
2023	27		Flóra Anna Buda	France, Hungary
2023	I Saw the Face of the Devil	J'ai vu le visage du diable	Julia Kowalski	France
2023	Inside the Skin	Daroone Poust	Shafagh Abosaba, Maryam Mahdiye	Iran
2023	Mast-Del		Maryam Tafakory	Iran
2023	Strange Way of Life	Extrana forma de vida	Pedro Almodóvar	Spain
2023	Stranger		Jehnny Beth, Iris Chassaigne	France
2024	Southern Brides	Las novias del sur	Elena Lopez Riera	Switzerland, Spain
2024	Immaculata		Kim Lêa Sakka	Germany, Lebanon
2024	My Senses Are All I Have to Offer	As minhas sensações são tudo o que tenho para oferecer	Isadora Neves Marques	Portugal
2024	Sauna Day	Sannapäiv	Anna Hints, Tushar Prakash	Estonia
2024	Three	三	Amie Song	United States
2025
2025	Bleat!	கத்து!	Ananth Subramaniam	Malaysia, Philippines, France
2025	Before the Sea Forgets		Ngọc Duy Lê	Singapore
2025	Erogenesis		Xandra Popescu	Germany
2025	Talk Me		Joecar Hanna	United States, Spain
2026
2026	Silent Voices		Nadine Misong Jin	United States
2026	Adgwa-Ata		Zsuzsanna Kreif	Hungary, France
2026	Eri		Honami Yano	Japan, France
2026	The Sentinel	La Sentinelle	Ali Cherri	France
2026	What Do You Seek in the Dark?		Tossaphon Riantong	Thailand

== Jurors ==
=== 2010 ===
- Benedict Arnulf, artistic director of Love In & Out, Film Festival Gay and Lesbian Nice
- Florence Ben Sadoun, editorial director, First
- Roman Coal, film journalist (Stubborn, Inrockuptibles)
- Mike Goodridge, director of the publication Screen International
- Xavier Leherpeur, film journalist, Studio Ciné Live, Canal +
- Ivan Mitifiot, mixed coordinator of screens, dating gay and lesbian film Lyon
- Pascale Ourbih, president of the "festival Chéries-Chéris"
- Brian Robinson, programmer Festival lesbian and gay film London

=== 2011 ===
- Elisabeth Quin, Paris Première – Jury President
- Thomas Abeltshauser, German journalist (Männer, Die Welt, WINQ)
- Fred Arends, Pink Screens Festival in Brussels (Belgium)
- Esther Cuénot, Cinémarges Festival Bordeaux
- Gérard Lefort, Liberation
- Roberto Schinardi, Il Manifesto Pride Gay.it (Italy)

=== 2012 ===
- Julie Gayet, actress and TV producer, France – Jury President
- Sam Ashby, editor and designer of posters, Britain, Little Joe magazine
- Jim Dobson, officer and director, U.S. Indie PR
- Sarah Neal, head of programming, Australia, Brisbane Queer Film Festival
- Frédéric Niolle, assistant director and journalist, France, Canal + Cinéma Paris Première, Radio France
- Moira Sullivan, university lecturer, critic, director, United States and Sweden, FilmFestivals.com

=== 2013 ===
- João Pedro Rodrigues, Portuguese filmmaker – Jury President
- Daniel Dreifuss
- Annie Maurette
- Nicolas Gilson
- Michel Reilhac

=== 2014 ===
- Bruce La Bruce, Canadian writer and film director – Jury President
- Anna Margarita Albelo, Cuban-American film director
- João Ferreira, Portuguese artistic director and programmer of Queer Lisboa festival
- Charlotte Lipinska, French journalist and actress
- Ricky Mastro, Brazilian programmer of Recifest film festival

=== 2015 ===
- Desiree Akhavan, Iranian-American film director – Jury President
- Ava Cahen, French journalist
- Laëtitia Eïdo, French actress
- Elli Mastorou, French journalist
- Nadia Turincev, Franco-Russian film producer

=== 2016 ===
- Olivier Ducastel and Jacques Martineau, French film directors – Jury Presidents
- Emilie Brisavoine, French film director and actress
- João Federici, Brazilian artistic director of Festival MixBrasil
- Marie Sauvion, French film journalist

=== 2017 ===
- Travis Mathews, American film director – Jury President
- Yair Hochner, founder and artistic director of TLVFest
- Paz Lazaro, Programs "Panorama" section of Berlinale
- Lidia Leber Terki, France
- Didier Roth-Bettoni, journalist and historian of cinema

=== 2018 ===
- Sylvie Pialat, French film producer – Jury President
- Boyd Van Hoeij, Dutch film critic
- Dounia Sichov, French actress, editor and producer
- Morgan Simon, French filmmaker
- Pepe Ruiloba, Mexican film festival programmer and film critic

=== 2019 ===
- Virginie Ledoyen, French actress – Jury President
- Claire Duguet, French cinematographer and filmmaker
- Kee-Yoon Kim, French comedian
- Filipe Matzembacher, Brazilian filmmaker
- Marcio Reolon, Brazilian filmmaker

=== 2021 ===
- Nicolas Maury – Jury President
- Josza Anjembe
- Roxanne Mesquida
- Vahram Muratyan
- Aloïse Sauvage

=== 2022 ===
- Catherine Corsini – Jury President
- Djanis Bouzyani, French actor, director and screenwriter
- Marilou Duponchel, French journalist
- Stéphane Riethauser, Swiss director
- Paul Struthers, Australian producer

=== 2023 ===
- John Cameron Mitchell – Jury President
- Juliette Chevillotte
- Zeno Graton
- Isabel Sandoval
- Cédric Succivalli

=== 2024 ===
- Lukas Dhont – Jury President
- Hugo "Paloma" Bardin
- Sophie Letourneur
- Juliana Rojas
- Jad Salfiti

=== 2025 ===
- Christophe Honoré – Jury President
- Marcelo Caetano
- Faridah Gbadamosi
- Léonie Pernet
- Timé Zoppé

=== 2026 ===
- Anna Mouglalis — Jury Co-president
- Thomas Jolly — Jury Co-president
- Raya Martigny
- Jehnny Beth
- André Fischer

== See also ==
- Teddy Award
- Queer Lion
