= Guy Marchand =

French actor, musician and singer (1937–2023)

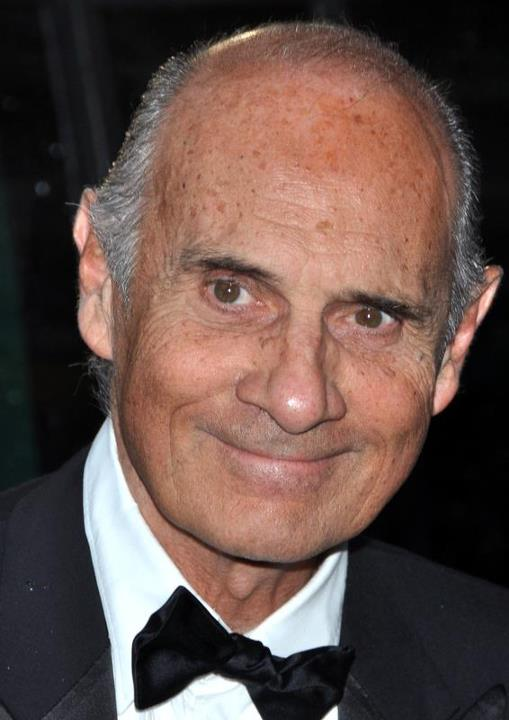
- Marchand in 2012
- Born: 22 May 1937; Paris, France
- Died: 15 December 2023 (aged 86); Cavaillon, France
- Occupations: Actor, musician, singer
- Years active: 1962–2023

Guy Marchand (French: [ɡi maʁʃɑ̃]; 22 May 1937 – 15 December 2023) was a French actor, musician, and singer. He appeared in over 100 films in over 30 years, but was best known for his role as the fictional television private detective Nestor Burma.

== Life and career ==
Guy Émile Marchand was born in Paris, 19th arrondissement, the son of a scrap merchant and a housewife and grew up in Belleville, during the Occupation and contracted tuberculosis at the age of ten. Spending time in Sarthe in the country he learned to ride and kept a love of horses throughout his life. In Paris, he regularly went to the Danube cinema. While at the Lycée Voltaire secondary school in Paris he played the clarinet in night clubs in Saint-Germain-des-Prés.

His military service was in an airborne troops division at the École des troupes aéroportées (BETAP) in Pau, becoming a sous-lieutenant – parachutist. He was assigned to the 3rd foreign infantry regiment as liaison officier during the Algerian war. As a parachute officer he was an advisor for the film Le Jour le plus long and entered the world of cinema. He made around 60 parachute jumps in his life.

His first success however was as a crooner, with a popular hit of 1965 La Passionata, followed by other albums and singles.

His film career mainly saw him in supporting roles; an inspector opposite Lino Ventura in Garde à vue, by Claude Miller won him a César in 1982 and the same year he was in Nestor Burma, détective de choc, by Jean-Luc Miesch, where Michel Serrault took the title role, but which Marchand later interpreted for over ten years in the television series Nestor Burma.

Other important roles included Coup de torchon by Bertrand Tavernier (1981), with Philippe Noiret, Cousin, Cousine, by Jean-Charles Tacchella (1975), and a cynical provincial garage man in L'été en pente douce, by Gérard Krawczyk (1987).

He published an autobiography entitled Le Guignol des Buttes-Chaumont in 2007 in which he wrote of his childhood, experiences in Algeria, his singing career and love for cars. Marchand died in Cavaillon on 15 December 2023, at the age of 86.

== Selected filmography ==
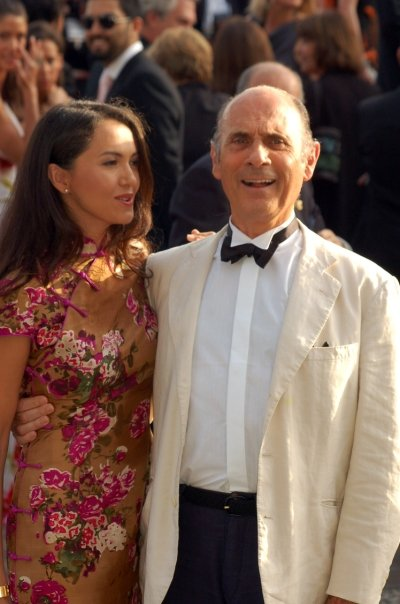
Marchand (right) at the 2007 Cannes Film Festival.

- 1962: The Longest Day as an extra (Uncredited)
- 1972: Une belle fille comme moi by François Truffaut: Roger (Sam Golden)
- 1975: Cousin Cousine, directed by Jean-Charles Tacchella: Pascal
- 1978: Holiday Hotel (L'Hôtel de la plage), directed by Michel Lang: Hubert Delambre
- 1979: Le Maître-nageur, directed by Jean-Louis Trintignant: Marcel Potier
- 1980: Loulou, directed by Maurice Pialat: André
- 1981: Garde à Vue, directed by Claude Miller: Inspecteur Marcel Belmont (César for best supporting actor)
- 1981: Coup de Torchon, directed by Bertrand Tavernier: Marcel Chavasson
- 1982: Les Sous-doués en vacances, directed by Claude Zidi: Paul Memphis
- 1983: Deadly Circuit, directed by Claude Miller: The pale man
- 1983: Entre Nous, directed by Diane Kurys: Michel Korski
- 1983: Der Mann von Suez (TV miniseries), directed by Christian-Jaque: Ferdinand de Lesseps
- 1984: P'tit Con, directed by Gérard Lauzier: Bob Choupon
- 1985: Hold-Up, directed by Alexandre Arcady: Georges
- 1986: Conseil de famille, directed by Costa-Gavras: Maximilien Faucon
- 1987: L'été en pente douce, directed by Gérard Krawczyk: Andre Voke
- 1987: Charlie Dingo, directed by Gilles Béhat: Charlie Dingo
- 1987: Noyade interdite, directed by Pierre Granier-Deferre: Inspecteur Leroyer
- 1989: Try This One for Size, directed by Guy Hamilton: Ottavioni
- 1989: Les Maris, les Femmes, les Amants, directed by Pascal Thomas: Bruno
- 1990: My New Partner II, directed by Claude Zidi: Guy Brisson
- 1991-2003: Nestor Burma (TV series): Nestor Burma
- 1991: May Wine (TV movie), directed by Carol Wiseman: Dr. Paul Charmant
- 1996: Beaumarchais, directed by Édouard Molinaro: Court Member
- 1996: The Best Job in the World, directed by Gérard Lauzier: Gauthier
- 2002: Ma femme s'appelle Maurice, directed by Jean-Marie Poiré: Charles Boisdain
- 2006: Dans Paris, directed by Christophe Honoré: Mirko
- 2006: Paid, directed by Laurence Lamers: Giuseppe
- 2007: After Him (Après lui), directed by Gaël Morel: François
- 2008: Passe-passe, directed by Tonie Marshall: Pierre Delage, the Minister
- 2010: L'Arbre et la forêt, directed by Olivier Ducastel and Jacques Martineau: Frédérick Muller
- 2014: L'Art de la fugue, directed by Brice Cauvin: Francis
- 2014: The Dune, directed by Yossi Aviram: Paolo
- 2015: Paris-Willouby, directed by Arthur Delaire and Quentin Reynaud: Police officer 1
- 2017: Just to Be Sure directed by Carine Tardieu: The father

== Honors and awards ==
Knight of the Order of Legion of Honour
