= Jacques Bonnaffé =

French actor and stage director

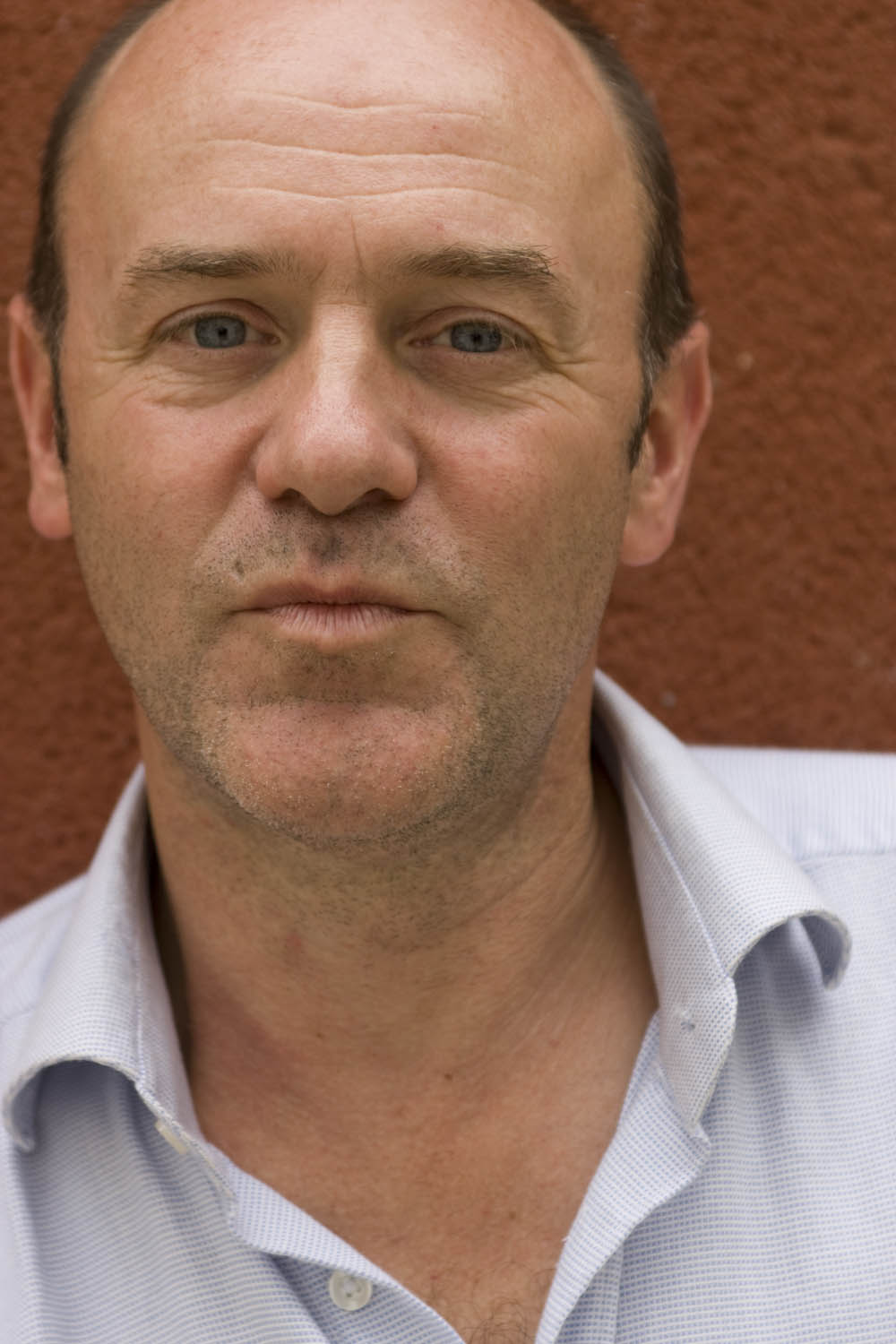
- Jacques Bonnaffé (2008)
- Born: 22 June 1958 (age 67); Douai, France
- Occupations: Actor, Stage director
- Years active: 1979-present

Jacques Bonnaffé (born 22 June 1958) is a French actor and stage director. He has appeared in more than ninety films since 1980.

== Debut ==
Jacques Bonnaffé was formed at the Lille Conservatory after his high school years in Douai (North) where he practiced amateur theater.

At 20, he started in the film Anthracite directed by Édouard Niermans.

In 1995, he is the French voice of actor Kevin Spacey in the film The Usual Suspects.

He is also dedicated to poetry and readings of Arthur Rimbaud, Jules Mousseron or other authors such as Ludovic Janvier, Valérie Rouzeau, Jacques Darras or Jean-Pierre Verheggen. He directs plays with contemporary authors like Joseph Danan, Jean-Christophe Bailly in Nature loves to hide. Since September 2015 he is everyday on France Culture for his column "Jacques Bonnaffé read Poetry".

== Theater ==
Year	Title	Author	Director	Notes
1979-81	Britannicus	Jean Racine	Gildas Bourdet	
1982	Les Bas-fonds	Maxime Gorki	Gildas Bourdet (2)	
1983	The Merchant of Venice	William Shakespeare	Saskia Cohen-Tanugi	
1983	Casimir et Caroline	Ödön von Horváth	Hans Peter Cloos	
1985	L'Épreuve	Pierre de Marivaux	Claude Stratz (2)	
1985	Le Legs	Pierre de Marivaux	Claude Stratz	
1987	Hello and Goodbye	Athol Fugard	John Berry	
1987	Nicht Fisch nicht Fleisch	Franz Xaver Kroetz	Gilles Chavassieux	
1988-89	Paris-Nord, attractions pour Noces et Banquets	Jacques Bonnaffé	Jacques Bonnaffé	
1990	La Fonction	Jean-Marie Besset	Patrice Kerbrat	Nominated - Molière Award for Best Supporting Actor
1990	La Veuve	Pierre Corneille	Christian Rist	
1991	Ajax	Sophocles	Christian Schiaretti	
1991	Passages	Arthur Rimbaud	Jacques Bonnaffé (2)	
1991	Lettres d'Abyssinie	Arthur Rimbaud	Jacques Bonnaffé (3)	
1992	Tales from the Vienna Woods	Ödön von Horváth	André Engel	
1992	Du geste de bois	Jean-François Peyret	Sophie Loucachevsky	
1992	Dîner de textes	Jacques Bonnaffé	Jacques Bonnaffé (4)	
1994	Rien la vie	Yves Charnet	Jacques Bonnaffé (5)	
1994	Cafougnette et l'Défilé	Jules Mousseron	Jacques Bonnaffé (6)	
1995-96	Inaccessibles Amours	Paul Emond	Abbès Zahmani	
1996	Les Affaires du Baron Laborde	Hermann Broch	Simone Amouyal	
1997	Tour de Piste	Christian Giudicelli	Jacques Bonnaffé (7)	
1997	In the Company of Men	Edward Bond	Alain Françon	
1998	Comme des malades	Hervé Prudon	Jacques Bonnaffé (8)	
1999	Fantômas	Marcel Allain & Pierre Souvestre	Patrice Gauthier	
1999	The Colonel Bird	Hristo Boychev	Didier Bezace	
1999	King	Michel Vinaver	Alain Françon (2)	
2000	54 x 13	Jean-Bernard Pouy	Jacques Bonnaffé (9)	
2000	Histoire naturelle de l'Esprit	Jean-François Peyret	Jean-François Peyret	
2001	Une soirée Ch'ti	Michel Quint	Jacques Bonnaffé (10)	
2001	Les Langagières 4	Jacques Bonnaffé	Jacques Bonnaffé (11)	
2002	The Treatment	Martin Crimp	Nathalie Richard	
2003	Des chimères en automne ou l’Impromptu de Chaillot	Jean-François Peyret & Alain Prochiantz	Jean-François Peyret (2)	
2003-04	Little Eyolf	Henrik Ibsen	Alain Françon (3)	
2004	The Odyssey: A Modern Sequel	Nikos Kazantzakis	Jacques Bonnaffé (12)	
2004	Jacques two Jacques	Jacques Darras	Jacques Bonnaffé (13)	
2004-05	Le Banquet du faisan	Jacques Bonnaffé	Jacques Bonnaffé (14)	
2005	The Comedy of Errors	William Shakespeare	Marc Feld	
2006	Winter	Jon Fosse	Gilles Chavassieux (2)	
2006	Les Antilopes	Heinig Mankell	Jean-Pierre Vincent	
2007	Le Mental de l’équipe	Emmanuel Bourdieu & Frédéric Bélier-Garcia	Denis Podalydès & Frédéric Bélier-Garcia	
2007	Le Banquet francophone	Jacques Bonnaffé & Claude Duneton	Jacques Bonnaffé (15)	
2007	L'Instrument à pression	David Lescot	Véronique Bellegarde	
2007-11	L'Oral et Hardi	Jean-Pierre Verheggen	Jacques Bonnaffé (16)	Molière Award for Best Company; Nominated - Molière Award for Best Actor
2008	Scènes d'hiver - Carnabal	Jacques Bonnaffé	Jacques Bonnaffé (17)	
2009-10	Sous l'œil d'Œdipe	Joël Jouanneau	Joël Jouanneau	
2011	Le Problème	François Bégaudeau	Arnaud Meunier	
2011	Le Babil des classes dangereuses	Valère Novarina	Denis Podalydès (2)	
2011	L'invitation au fromage	Jacques Bonnaffé	Jacques Bonnaffé (18)	
2011	Nature aime à se cacher	Jacques Bonnaffé	Jacques Bonnaffé (19)	
2011	Ex Vivo-In Vitro	Jean-François Peyret & Alain Prochiantz	Jean-François Peyret (3)	
2012	Le roi du bois	Pierre Michon	Sandrine Anglade	
2013	Hannibal	Christian Dietrich Grabbe	Bernard Sobel	
2013	Chassez le Naturel	Jacques Bonnaffé	Jacques Bonnaffé (20)	
2014	36 nulles de salon	Daniel Cabanis	Jacques Bonnaffé (21)	
2016	Madame Bovary	Gustave Flaubert	Tiago Rodrigues	

== Filmography ==
Year	Title	Role	Director	Notes
1980	Anthracite	A student	Édouard Niermans	
1981	Les écumeurs de Lille	M. Marcel	Fernand Vincent	TV movie
1981	La scélérate Thérèse		Jean-François Claire	TV movie
1982	Britannicus	Néron	Alexandre Tarta	TV movie
1983	First Name: Carmen	Joseph Bonnaffé	Jean-Luc Godard	
1983	Ballades	Pierre	Catherine Corsini	Short
1984	Paris vu par... 20 ans après	Paul	Philippe Venault	
1984	Manipulations	Edmond	Marco Pico	TV movie
1985	La tentation d'Isabelle	Bruno	Jacques Doillon	Nominated - César Award for Most Promising Actor
1985	Escalier C	Claude	Jean-Charles Tacchella	
1985	Elle a passé tant d'heures sous les sunlights...	The director	Philippe Garrel	
1985	Blanche et Marie	Louis	Jacques Renard	
1985	Le meilleur de la vie	Adrien	Renaud Victor	
1985	Mort carnaval	Inspector Berrutti	Daniel Van Cutsem	TV movie
1986	La femme secrète	Antoine	Sébastien Grall	
1986	Cinéma 16	Alain Duval	François Dupont-Midi	TV series (1 episode)
1987	O Desejado	Tiago	Paulo Rocha	
1987	Résidence surveillée	Jacky	Frédéric Compain	
1988	Sueurs froides	Laurence's lover	Claire Devers	TV series (1 episode)
1989	Baptême	André Gravey	René Féret	Nominated - César Award for Best Supporting Actor
1989	Blancs cassés	Pierre	Philippe Venault (2)	
1989	Le goût de plaire	Geoffroy	Olivier Ducastel	Short
1990	La fracture du myocarde	History teacher	Jacques Fansten	
1990	La campagne de Cicéron	Hippolyte	Jacques Davila	
1990	L'invité clandestin	Bourgelin	Michel Mitrani	TV movie
1990	L'ami Giono: Ivan Ivanovitch Kossiakoff	Jean Giono	Fabrice Cazeneuve	TV movie
1991	Arthur Rimbaud - Une biographie	The narrator	Richard Dindo	
1991	Les enfants du vent	Simon	Krzysztof Rogulski	
1991	Des voix dans la nuit - Les mains d'Orlac	Steve Orlac	Peter Kassovitz	TV movie
1991	Le gang des tractions	Pierrot le Fou	Josée Dayan	TV mini-series
1992	De nietsnut		Ab van Ieperen	TV movie
1992	Un flic pourri	Inspector Claude Rongier	Josée Dayan (2)	TV movie
1993	Roulez jeunesse !	Bertrand	Jacques Fansten (2)	
1993	La place d'un autre	Dr. Vanacker	René Féret (2)	
1993	Couples et amants	Paul	John Lvoff	
1993	Faut-il aimer Mathilde ?	Jean-Pierre	Edwin Baily	
1993	Ici, là ou ailleurs		Vincent Loury	Short
1993	Légendes de la forêt viennoise	Alfred	André Engel	TV movie
1994	Jules	Lucien	Christian Palligiano	TV movie
1994	La fille du roi	Simon	Philippe Triboit	TV movie
1994	Jalna	Maurice Vaughan	Philippe Monnier	TV mini-series
1995	L'homme aux semelles de vent	Bardey	Marc Rivière	TV movie
1996	Les frères Gravet	Jacques Gravet	René Féret (3)	
1996	L'année du certif	Paul Fontanes	Jacques Renard (2)	TV movie
1996	L'histoire du samedi	Séverin	Serge Meynard	TV series (1 episode)
1997	Lucie Aubrac	Pascal	Claude Berri	
1997	C'est pour la bonne cause !	Martineau	Jacques Fansten (3)	
1997	Tortilla y cinema	The producer	Martin Provost	
1997	Capitaine au long cours	Captain Hervé	Bianca Conti Rossini	
1997	Rien que des grandes personnes		Jean-Marc Brondolo	Short
1997	Peut être si j'en ai envie...	The man	Marianne Basler	Short
1997	Un petit grain de folie	Bernard Dufraisse	Sébastien Grall (2)	TV movie
1998	The Perfect Guy	François	Jacques Martineau & Olivier Ducastel (2)	
1998	Michael Kael contre la World News Company	The medecin	Christopher Smith	
1999	Venus Beauty Institute	Jacques	Tonie Marshall	
1999	Innocent	Maxime	Costa Natsis	
1999	Le plus beau pays du monde	Couperin	Marcel Bluwal	
1999	Le sourire du clown	Father Daniel	Éric Besnard	
2001	Va savoir	Pierre	Jacques Rivette	
2001	2 X 2 versions de l'amour	The man	Patricia Bardon	Short
2002	Les Diables	Doran	Christophe Ruggia	
2002	The Repentant	Joseph	Laetitia Masson	
2002	Au bout du rouleau	Georges Massy	Thierry Binisti	TV movie
2002	L'année des grandes filles	Paul	Jacques Renard (3)	TV movie
2002	Le Champ dolent, le roman de la terre	Jules	Hervé Baslé	TV mini-series
2003	C'était pas la guerre	The father	Alexandrine Brisson	Short
2003	Un fils de notre temps	The narrator	Fabrice Cazeneuve (2)	TV movie
2004	Immortal	Allgood	Enki Bilal	
2004	When the Sea Rises	The server	Yolande Moreau & Gilles Porte	
2004	La vie est si courte		Hervé Baslé (2)	TV movie
2005	Lemming	Nicolas Chevalier	Dominik Moll	
2005	Crustacés et Coquillages	Mathieu	Jacques Martineau (2) & Olivier Ducastel (3)	
2005	The Art of Breaking Up	Fontanet	Michel Deville	
2005	Itinéraires	Commander Amado	Christophe Otzenberger	
2006	The Page Turner	M. Prouvost	Denis Dercourt	
2006	Les amitiés maléfiques	Professor Mortier	Emmanuel Bourdieu	
2006	Il a suffi que maman s'en aille...	Olivier's friend	René Féret (4)	
2006	Le Cri	Jules Panaud	Hervé Baslé (3)	TV mini-series
2007	Le Deuxième souffle	Pascal	Alain Corneau	
2007	Capitaine Achab	Starbuck	Philippe Ramos	
2007	Les zygs, le secret des disparus	Laugier / Bébernard	Jacques Fansten (4)	TV movie
2008	La fabrique des sentiments	André	Jean-Marc Moutout	
2008	Des Indes à la planète Mars	Auguste Lemaître	Christian Merlhiot & Matthieu Orléan	
2009	Around a Small Mountain	Marlo	Jacques Rivette (2)	
2009	Les Williams	William	Alban Mench	Short
2009	Le commissariat	Xavier Vallat	Michel Andrieu	TV movie
2011	Derrière les murs	Paul	Julien Lacombe & Pascal Sid	
2011	Early One Morning	The phone friend	Jean-Marc Moutout (2)	
2011	Dédicace	Antoine	Olivier Chrétien	Short
2011	Drumont, histoire d'un antisémite français	Edmond de Goncourt	Emmanuel Bourdieu (2)	TV movie
2011	La république des enfants	Célestin	Jacques Fansten (5)	TV movie
2011	Dans les pas de Marie Curie	The narrator	Krzysztof Rogulski (2)	Documentary
2012	Coming Home	Yves Faroult	Frédéric Videau	
2012	Clémenceau	Raymond Poincaré	Olivier Guignard	TV movie
2013	Violette	Jean Genet	Martin Provost (2)	
2013	Je m'appelle Hmmm...	Céline's father	agnès b.	
2014	Le système de Ponzi	Zarossi	Dante Desarthe	TV movie
2014-15	Ainsi soient-ils	Monseigneur Poileaux	Rodolphe Tissot	TV series (16 episodes); ACS Award for Best Actor
2015	Come What May	Roger	Christian Carion	
2015	Mad Love	The vicar	Philippe Ramos (2)	
2015	Anton Tchékhov 1890	Aleksey Suvorin	René Féret (5)	
2016	Le Fils de Joseph	The peasant	Eugène Green	
2016	Seances		Guy Maddin	
2025	La rebelle: Les aventures de la jeune George Sand	Duris-Dufresne	Rodolphe Tissot	

== Awards and nominations ==
=== César Award ===
Year	Award	Film	Result
1986	Most Promising Actor	La tentation d'Isabelle	Nominated
1990	Best Supporting Actor	Baptême	Nominated

=== Molière Award ===
Year	Award	Film	Result
1991	Best Supporting Actor	La Fonction	Nominated
2009	Best Company	L'Oral et Hardi	Won
2009	Best Actor	L'Oral et Hardi	Nominated

== Audio books ==
He also recorded several audio books:

- Discourse on the Method by René Descartes (2003)
- Gargantua by François Rabelais (2004)
- La main coupée by Blaise Cendrars (2005)
- L'Oral et Hardi by Jean-Pierre Verheggen (2003)
- L'Oral et Hardi by Jean-Pierre Verheggen (2013), Camino Verde version
