= Patachou =

French singer and actress

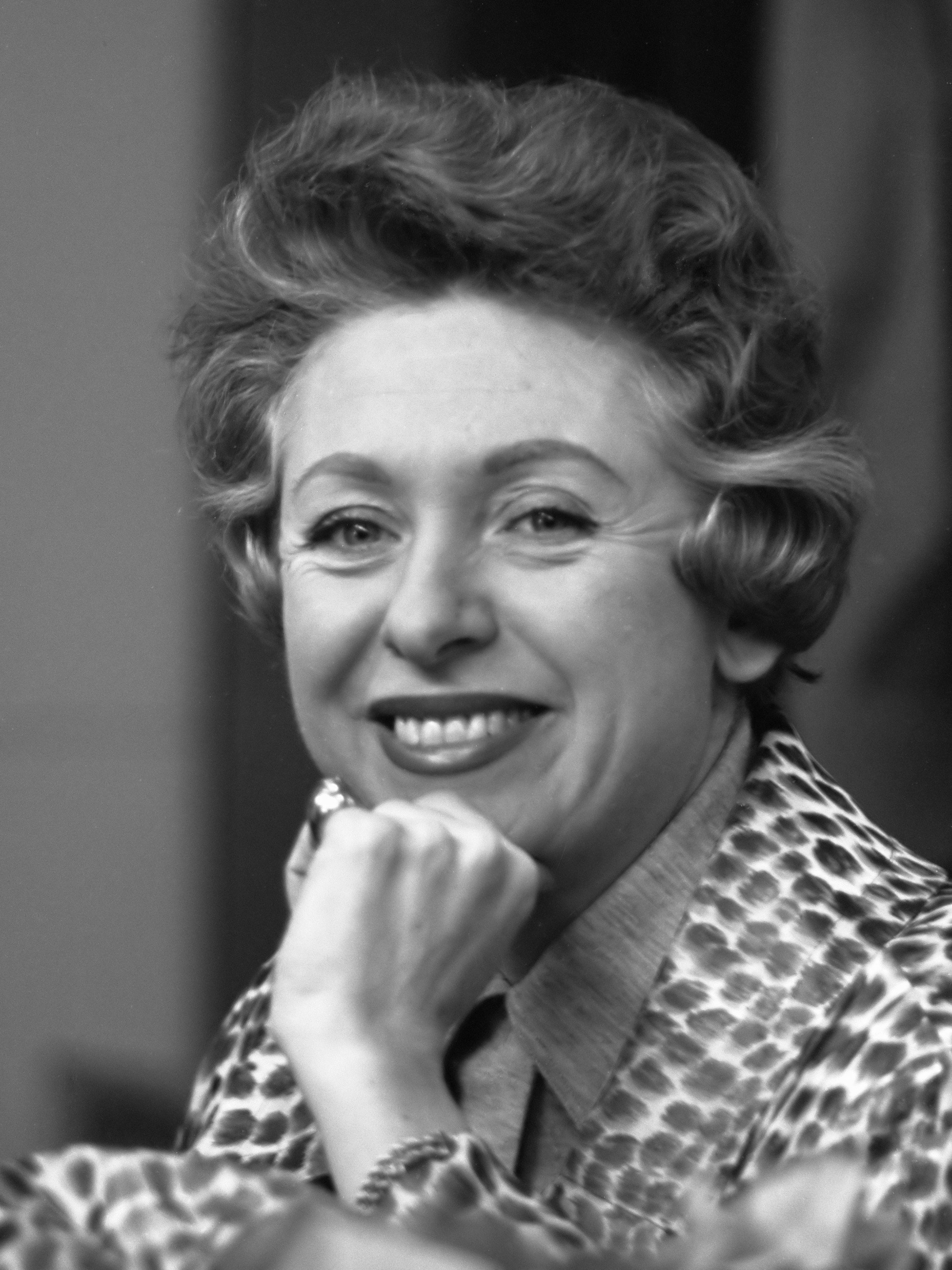
- Patachou in 1961
- Born: Henriette Ragon; 10 June 1918; Paris, France
- Died: 30 April 2015 (aged 96); Neuilly-sur-Seine, France
- Occupations: Singer, actress
- Spouse(s): Jean Billon, Arthur Lesser
- Children: Pierre Billon

Henriette Ragon (10 June 1918 – 30 April 2015), better known as Patachou, was a French singer and actress, best-known for popularizing Georges Brassens songs by singing them before he became famous. She was an Officier of the Légion d'honneur.

== Biography ==
=== Early life ===
Born in the 12th arrondissement of Paris, Henriette Ragon began her working life as a typist, then a factory worker, a shoeseller and an antique dealer.

=== Patachou ===
In 1948, with her husband Jean Billon she took over a cabaret-restaurant in Montmartre, called Patachou. (Their son Pierre Billon had some success as a singer in the 1970s and wrote J'ai oublié de vivre for Johnny Hallyday.) She began to sing in the bistro, and journalists began to call her Patachou after the name of her cabaret (pâte-à-choux means cream puff dough). Georges Brassens sang there, and together they sang the duet "Maman, papa". She was the first to interpret other songs he composed such as "Le bricoleur", "La chasse aux papillons", etc.

The evening she sang them for the first time, she suggested her audience stay to the end of the show and meet the writer of these songs, and Brassens went up on to the Patachou stage for the first time and sang Le Gorille and P..de toi. Sometimes she would collect half-ties (she would snip the neckties of customers reluctant to join in the singing and immediately staple them to the ceiling, a habit which has created a very original decor of the place - hundreds of neckties hanging above) – Thomas Dewey and Errol Flynn were among her victims.

=== Touring ===
She appeared at the Bobino, a Montparnasse music-hall, toured in France and then further afield. From 1953 onwards, she could be seen on-stage at the Palladium, the Waldorf Astoria, and Carnegie Hall, and throughout the United States. From the beginning of the 1970s she toured Japan and Sweden where 'L'eternel Parigot', with her cheeky Parisian register, was popular.

=== Death ===
Patachou died on 30 April 2015 at the age of 96.

== Awards ==
Patachou was made Officier of the Légion d'honneur on 1 January 2009

== Recordings ==
Her first records were released in 1952 on Philips. In the mid-1950s she began recording albums for CBS. In the latter 1950s she began recording on the Audio Fidelity label.

== Filmography ==
- 1952: Jouons le jeu - la chanteuse (segments 'L'avarice' and 'La fidélité')
- 1953: Women of Paris (by Jean Boyer, Patachou sings "Brave Margot" by Georges Brassens) - Herself - Chanteuse
- 1955: Napoléon - Madame Sans-Gêne
- 1955: French Cancan (1955) - Yvette Guilbert
- 1983: Le disparu du 7 octobre (TV Movie, by Jacques Ertaud) - Blanche Auroux
- 1986: Faubourg St Martin - Madame Coppercage
- 1987: la Rumba (by Roger Hanin) - Madame Meyrals
- 1990: Le champignon des Carpathes - Madame Ambrogiano
- 1990: Les matins chagrins - Alice
- 1990: Night of the Fox (TV Movie)
- 1992: Chasse gardée - Madame Cygne
- 1993: Cible émouvante (by Pierre Salvadori) - Madame Meynard
- 1993: Les Grandes Marées (TV Mini-Series, by Jean Sagols) - Sophie Leclerc
- 1999: Pola X (by Leos Carax) - Marguerite
- 2000: Drôle de Félix (by Olivier Ducastel and Jacques Martineau) - Mathilde, Grandmother
- 2000: Les Acteurs (by Bertrand Blier) - Blind old lady
- 2001: Belphégor, le fantôme du Louvre (by Jean-Paul Salomé) - Geneviève
- 2004: San-Antonio (by Frédéric Auburtin) - Ruth Booz
