= Édouard Collin =

French actor

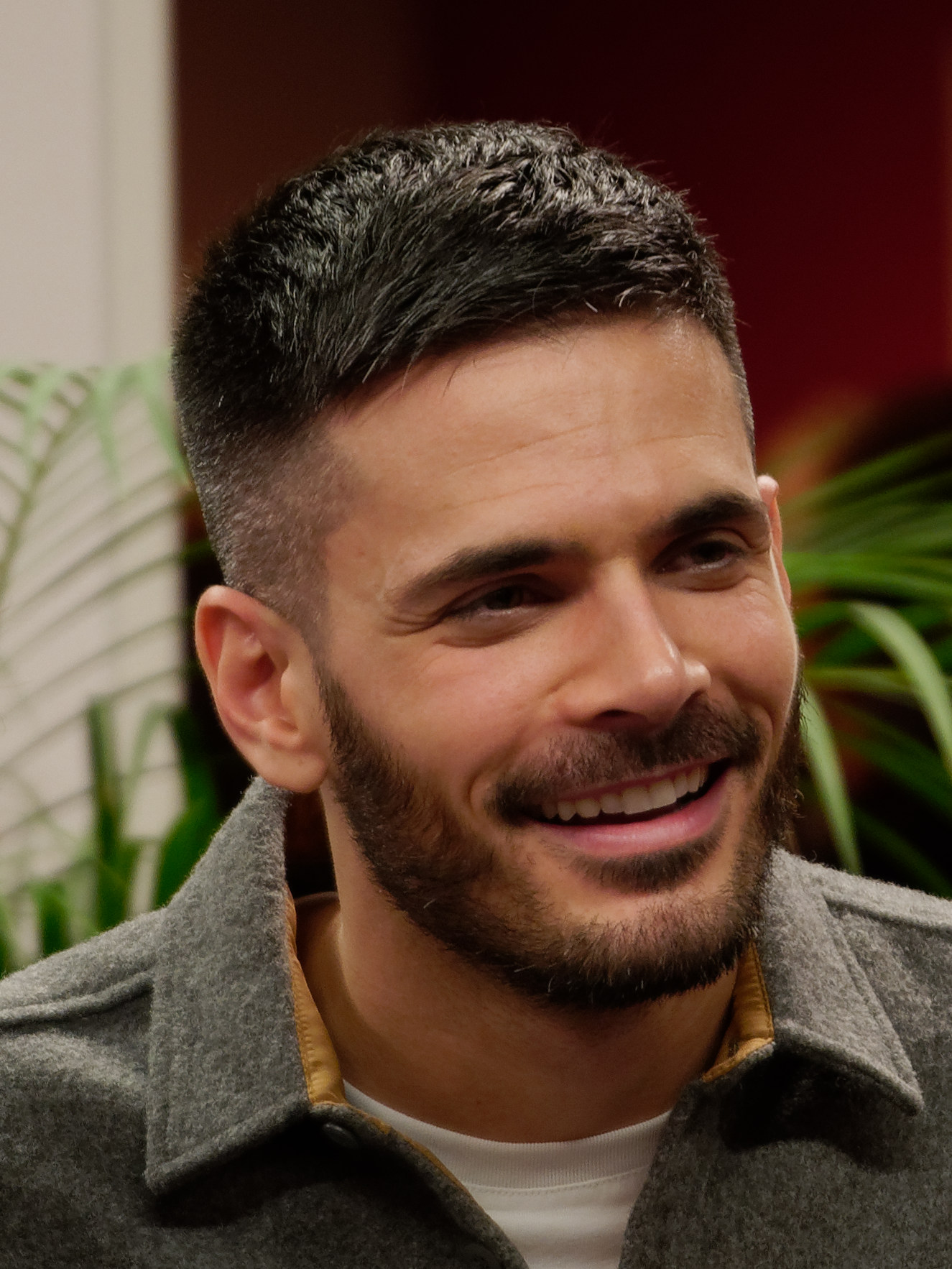
- Born: 28 February 1987 (age 39); Bagnolet, Seine-Saint-Denis, France
- Occupation: Actor
- Years active: 2005–present

Édouard Collin (French pronunciation: [edwaʁ kɔlɛ̃]; born 28 February 1987) is a French actor.

== Biography ==
Édouard Collin was born on February 28, 1987, in Bagnolet (Seine-Saint-Denis). He spent most of his childhood in Paris, where he lived with his actress mother. When his mother moved to Marseille at the age of twelve, he moved in with his grandmother to stay with the acting classes he was enrolled in.

== Theater ==
Year	Title	Author	Director
2005	Un cœur sauvage	Christophe Botti	Stéphane & Christophe Botti
2006	Les Amazones	Jean-Marie Chevret	Jean-Pierre Dravel & Olivier Macé
2007	Les Amazones, trois ans après	Jean-Marie Chevret	Jean-Pierre Dravel & Olivier Macé (2)
2008	The Little Dog Laughed	Douglas Carter Beane	Jean-Luc Revol
2009-10	Panique au ministère	Jean Franco & Guillaume Mélanie	Raymond Acquaviva
2011	Féminin, étrange et préjugés	Natacha Amal	Natacha Amal & Olivier Werner
2012	Lady Oscar	Guillaume Mélanie	Éric Civanyan
2013	Mariage plus vieux mariage heureux	Bruno Druart	Jean-Pierre Dravel & Olivier Macé (3)
2014	Revenir un jour	Franck Le Hen	Olivier Macé (4)
2016	La Candidate	Jean Franco & Guillaume Mélanie	Raymond Acquaviva (2)

== Filmography ==
Year	Title	Role	Director	Notes
2005	Crustacés et Coquillages	Martin	Olivier Ducastel & Jacques Martineau	
2006	Les irréductibles	Philippe	Renaud Bertrand	
2006	Madame la proviseur	Lucas Brissot	Philippe Bérenger	TV series (2 episodes)
2007	Hellphone	Franklin	James Huth	
2007	Marie Humbert, le secret d'une mère	Vincent Humbert	Marc Angelo	TV movie
2008	Born in 68	Christophe	Olivier Ducastel & Jacques Martineau (2)	
2008	Clara Sheller	Brad	Alain Berliner	TV series (2 episodes)
2012	La Smala s'en mêle	Rémi	Didier Grousset	TV series (3 episodes)
2014	Camping paradis	Thomas Lievremont	François Guérin	TV series (1 episode)
2015	Le sang de la vigne	Thibault Berger	Régis Musset	TV series (1 episode)
2016	Les liens du coeur	Damien	Régis Musset (2)	TV movie
2016	Nina	Nicolas Bourget	Éric Le Roux & Adeline Darraux	TV series (5 episodes)
