= Rajot =

Rajot is a surname. Notable people with the surname include:

- Lorenzo Rajot (born 1997), French footballer
- Pierre-Loup Rajot (born 1958), French stage, actor, director, producer and screenwriter
