= Cocosuma =

French indie pop band

- Origin: Paris, France
- Genres: Electronica, trip hop, indie pop
- Years active: 2001 - present
- Labels: FR: Third Side Records; UK: Setanta Records
- Members: Antoine Chabert (Chab the Jab); Michel Nassif (aka Fat Chimo); Amanda Butterworth
- Past members: Jen h.ka Kacey
- Website: cocosuma.net

Cocosuma is an indie pop band from Paris. Their albums, published at Third Side Records, have garnered both critical and public acclaim. Some of their tracks are picked for lounge or trip hop compilations. Cocosuma gained some fame in 2005 with the French mini-series Clara Sheller, in which their song The Servant played through the end credits.

== Band history ==
Cocosuma's first lead singer was Jen h.ka (I Refuse to Grow). Then, Kacey, the new singer, decided to leave the trio after the second album. Michel and Chab then met Amanda, who was to become their new singer on subsequent albums.

== Discography ==
=== Albums ===
- I Refuse To Grow Up (2001)
  - I Was Born Ready Baby, Yeah!
  - Walk That Walk
  - (Tapping) The Source
  - Innerlude
  - Poison In My Veins (Part 1 & 2)
  - One Love, One Revolution
  - Poison In My Veins (JP Cristal Dark Remix)
  - Of The Influence Of Fall On Music And Its Overall Consequences On The Youth's State Of Mind
- I Refuse To Remix (2002)
  - I Blue it (Jack Lahana remix)
  - Rocknroll (Alex Gopher remix)
  - Walk that Walk (Lowkick remix)
- Reindeer Show The Way (2004)
  - Communication's Lost
  - The Servant
  - Sparks
  - Hey You!
  - So As A Gentleman You Should Be More Polite
  - Daisy's Face
  - Easy Terms
  - Le Fusible
  - (How High) Can You Fly?
  - #1 (In Your Heart)
  - What's Left Of Us
  - Sailing Home
- We Were A Trio (2005)
  - Bowing Oceans By
  - Drizzling Not Dazzling
  - Nutopia
  - Bam! Tululu!
  - Did You Ever See
  - 090105
  - We Were A Trio
  - Courtyard
  - Mocking Stars
  - Two Cannot Be
- Charlotte's On Fire EP (2007)
  - Charlotte's On Fire
  - Minefield
  - Guess I'm Dumb
  - Charlotte's On Fire (Bot'Ox Remix)
  - Charlotte's On Fire (Nouvelle Vague Remix)
  - Cinders (Origami Birö Remix)
  - It Ain't Hip (To Be Labeled A Hippie)
- We'll Drive Home Backwards (2008)
  - You Are My Sunshine
  - Charlotte's On Fire
  - Twilight Zone
  - Cinders
  - Rec74
  - Suffragettes
  - My My My
  - Lady In Waiting
  - Oh Ruby Sun
  - Athletes!
  - Polly (Has My Disease)
  - The Verve Were Right
  - Broken Glass
  - Your Blue (hidden track)

=== Singles ===
- Easy Terms (2004)
- Bam! Tululu! (2005)
- Did You Ever See (2005)
- Charlotte On Fire (2007)

=== Others ===
- Pointing Excitedly To The Sky (2006)
  - Communication's Lost
  - Bam! Tululu!
  - The Servant
  - Sparks
  - Did You Ever See
  - Drizzling Yet Dazzling
  - We Were A Trio
  - Easy Terms
  - Nutopia
  - Daisy's Face
  - 090105
  - So As A Gentleman You Should Be More Polite
  - What's Left Of Us?
  - The Man Who Sold The World
  - Charllote In Fire

This United Kingdom release, is a combination of the two previous albums.

=== Compilations ===
- Ryūichi Sakamoto's iTunes playlist - (Tapping) The Source
- The In-Laws Original Soundtrack (2003) - Innerlude
- Park Hyatt Tokyo: Air Flow (2004) - (Tapping) The Source (different version than that on I refuse to grow up)
- Nova Tunes 1.1 (2005) - The Servant
- Bowie Mania (2007) - The Man Who Sold The World (previously unreleased)
