= Born in 68 =

- Film poster
- Directed by: Olivier Ducastel; Jacques Martineau
- Written by: Catherine Corsini; Olivier Ducastel; Guillaume Le Touze; Jacques Martineau
- Produced by: Lola Gans; Philippe Martin
- Starring: Laetitia Casta; Yannick Renier; Yann Trégouët
- Cinematography: Matthieu Poirot-Delpech
- Edited by: Dominique Galliéni
- Music by: Philippe Miller
- Distributed by: Pyramide Distribution
- Release date: 21 May 2008
- Running time: 173 minutes
- Country: France
- Language: French
- Budget: €4.6 million
- Box office: $538,748

Born in 68 (original title: Nés en 68) is a 2008 French drama film directed by Olivier Ducastel and Jacques Martineau. The film has the sub-title 'Nous nous aimerons jusqu'à la mort' ('We will love each other until death').

== Plot summary ==
In 1968 Catherine, Yves and Hervé are 20, all students in Paris; the May revolt up-ends their lives. They attempt to form their own community with friends on an abandoned farm in the Lot. Their need for freedom and individual fulfilment leads them to make choices which separates them in the end with Catherine alone remaining at the farm. In 1989 the children of Catherine and Yves become adults in a world that has profoundly changed: with the end of communism and the AIDS epidemic, they revisit the militant legacy of the previous generation. Much like their parents before them, they begin to question the generation that preceded them, while fighting for a better world than the one into which they were born.

== Cast ==
- Laetitia Casta as Catherine
- Yannick Renier as Yves
- Yann Trégouët as Hervé
- Christine Citti as Maryse
- Marc Citti as Serge
- Édouard Collin as Christophe
- Fejria Deliba as Dalila
- Gaëtan Gallier as Michel
- Sabrina Seyvecou as Ludmilla, the daughter of Catherine and Yves
- Théo Frilet as Boris, the son of Catherine and Yves
- Osman Elkharraz as Joseph, the son of Dalila and Michel
- Slimane Yefsah as Farivar, Ludmilla's husband
- Matthias Van Khache as Jean-Paul
- Thibault Vinçon as Vincent, friend of Boris
- Marilyne Canto as Dominique, Yves's partner
- Alain Fromager as Antoine, Catherine's friend
- Olivia Côte as Bernadette
- Sophie Barjac as Catherine's mother
- Pierre-Loup Rajot as Catherine's father

== Production ==
Principal photography began on 11 September 2007 and concluded on 10 December 2007. Filming took place in the Lot department, specifically in Figeac and Bessonies, as well as in Toulouse and Paris.

== Awards and nominations ==
Cabourg Film Festival

- Golden Swann - Best Actress (Laetitia Casta) and Best Male Newcomer (Yannick Renier).

== Release ==
Originally finished as two 100-minute episodes which were scheduled on Arte, and France 2 during 2009, a 170-minute shorter version was offered to the Cannes Film Festival organizers, in relation to the 40th anniversary of the 1968 events. A DVD of this cinema version was released in 2010.

== Reception ==
On review aggregator website Rotten Tomatoes, the film holds an approval rating of 50% based on 10 reviews, with an average rating of 5.3/10.
