= Souvenirs, Souvenirs =

Souvenirs, souvenirs
- Theatrical release poster
- Directed by: Ariel Zeitoun
- Written by: Daniel Saint-Hamont; Ariel Zeitoun
- Starring: Christophe Malavoy; Gabrielle Lazure
- Cinematography: Bruno de Keyzer
- Edited by: Geneviève Winding
- Music by: Cyril Assous; Jean-Paul Dréau
- Distributed by: Gaumont Distribution
- Release date: 19 September 1984
- Running time: 124 minutes
- Country: France
- Language: French

Souvenirs, Souvenirs is a 1984 French comedy film directed by Ariel Zeitoun.

In 1985 Pierre-Loup Rajot won the César Award for Most Promising Actor for his performance in the film.

== Cast ==
- Christophe Malavoy – Rego Boccara / John B. Cutton
- Gabrielle Lazure – Hélène Demeuze
- Philippe Noiret – le proviseur
- Annie Girardot – Emma Boccara
- Jean Benguigui – Samuel
- Pierre-Loup Rajot – Antoine Boccara
- Marlène Jobert – Nadia
- Claude Brasseur – Firmani
- Philippe Laudenbach – Fressynet
- Catherine Jacob – The postmaster
