= Brave Margot =

1953 song by Georges Brassens

"Brave Margot" is a 1953 song by Georges Brassens, about a young woman who breastfeeds a young kitten. It is one of his best known and most controversial songs.

== Lyrics ==
The lyrics describe a young, well-meaning but naïve shepherdess, Margot, who finds a lost kitten and adopts it. When the little cat is hungry, she gives it her breast. This attracts a lot of male onlookers and brings all life in the village to a standstill. The women of the village get jealous and therefore take the kitten to put it down. Margot is sad, but gets a husband and never shows her breasts to anyone else again.

== Cover versions ==
The song has been covered by Patachou in the 1953 film Women of Paris. Renaud covered it too on his 1996 album Renaud chante Brassens.

== In popular culture ==
When Brassens died in 1981, French cartoonist Jean-Marc Reiser made a graphic homage, in which a man sits in a train talking about his disgust with Brassens' filthy lyrics. While he talks a young woman sitting in front of him breastfeeds her cat in the manner of Brave Margot. This sight touches him, as he recognizes the image from the song, causing him to reconsider his opinion about Brassens' music.
