= Pauline Lafont =

French actress (1963–1988)

- Born: Pauline Aïda Simone Medveczky; 6 April 1963; Nîmes, France
- Died: 11 August 1988 (aged 25); Barre-des-Cévennes, Lozère, France
- Years active: 1975, 1982–1988

Pauline Lafont (6 April 1963 – 11 August 1988) was a French actress. She was the daughter of film star Bernadette Lafont and Diourka Medveczky, a Hungarian sculptor.

Born Pauline Aïda Simone Medveczky in Nîmes, France, she died in a hiking accident in Barre-des-Cévennes, Lozère, France. Three months and ten days after she had set out, her body was found by a passing farmer at the foot of a cliff, four kilometres from her home. Investigators determined she had fallen more than ten metres and died instantly. Prior to the discovery of her body, her disappearance had triggered several rumours regarding her whereabouts.

== Filmography ==
=== Film ===
- 1976: Vincent mit l'âne dans un pré (et s'en vint dans l'autre) (directed by Pierre Zucca) - Une petite fille
- 1983: Les Planqués du régiment (directed by Michel Caputo) - Christiane, l'infirmière
- 1983: Papy fait de la résistance (directed by Jean-Marie Poiré) - Colette Bourdelle
- 1983: Balade sanglante (Short, directed by Sylvain Madigan)
- 1983: Vive les femmes ! (directed by Claude Confortes) - Pauline
- 1984: The Bay Boy (directed by Daniel Petrie) - Janine Chaisson
- 1985: L'amour braque (directed by Andrzej Żuławski) - Martine (uncredited)
- 1985: Poulet au vinaigre (directed by Claude Chabrol) - Henriette
- 1985: Le pactole (directed by Jean-Pierre Mocky) - Anne Beaulieu
- 1986: La galette du roi (directed by Jean-Michel Ribes) - Maria-Helena de Castigliani
- 1986: I Hate Actors (directed by Gérard Krawczyk) - Elvina
- 1987: Sale temps (Short, directed by Alain Pigeaux) - Rachel
- 1987: L'été en pente douce (directed by Gérard Krawczyk) - Lilas
- 1987: Keep Up Your Right (directed by Jean-Luc Godard) - La golfeuse
- 1987: Sale destin (Short, directed by Sylvain Madigan) - (voice)
- 1987: Jing du qiu xia (directed by Hong Xie)
- 1988: Deux minutes de soleil en plus (directed by Gérard Vergez) - Cat

=== Television ===
- 1984: Dernier banco (TV Movie) - Madeleine
- 1984: Un chien écrasé - Manu
- 1986: Le petit docteur - Anna
- 1988: Coup de pouce - Caroline (final appearance)
