= 48th Berlin International Film Festival =

1998 film festival in Berlin, Germany

- Festival poster
- Opening film: The Boxer
- Closing film: The Rainmaker
- Location: Berlin, Germany
- Founded: 1951
- Awards: Golden Bear: Central Station
- No. of films: 351 films
- Festival date: 11–22 February 1998
- Website: http://www.berlinale.de

Berlin International Film Festival chronology
- 49th 47th

The 48th annual Berlin International Film Festival was held from 11 to 22 February 1998. The festival opened with the Irish film The Boxer by Jim Sheridan. Francis Ford Coppola's The Rainmaker was selected as the closing night film.

The Golden Bear was awarded to Central Station directed by Walter Salles. The retrospective was dedicated to Siodmak Bros., titled Siodmak Bros. Berlin – London – Paris – Hollywood was shown at the festival.

== Juries ==
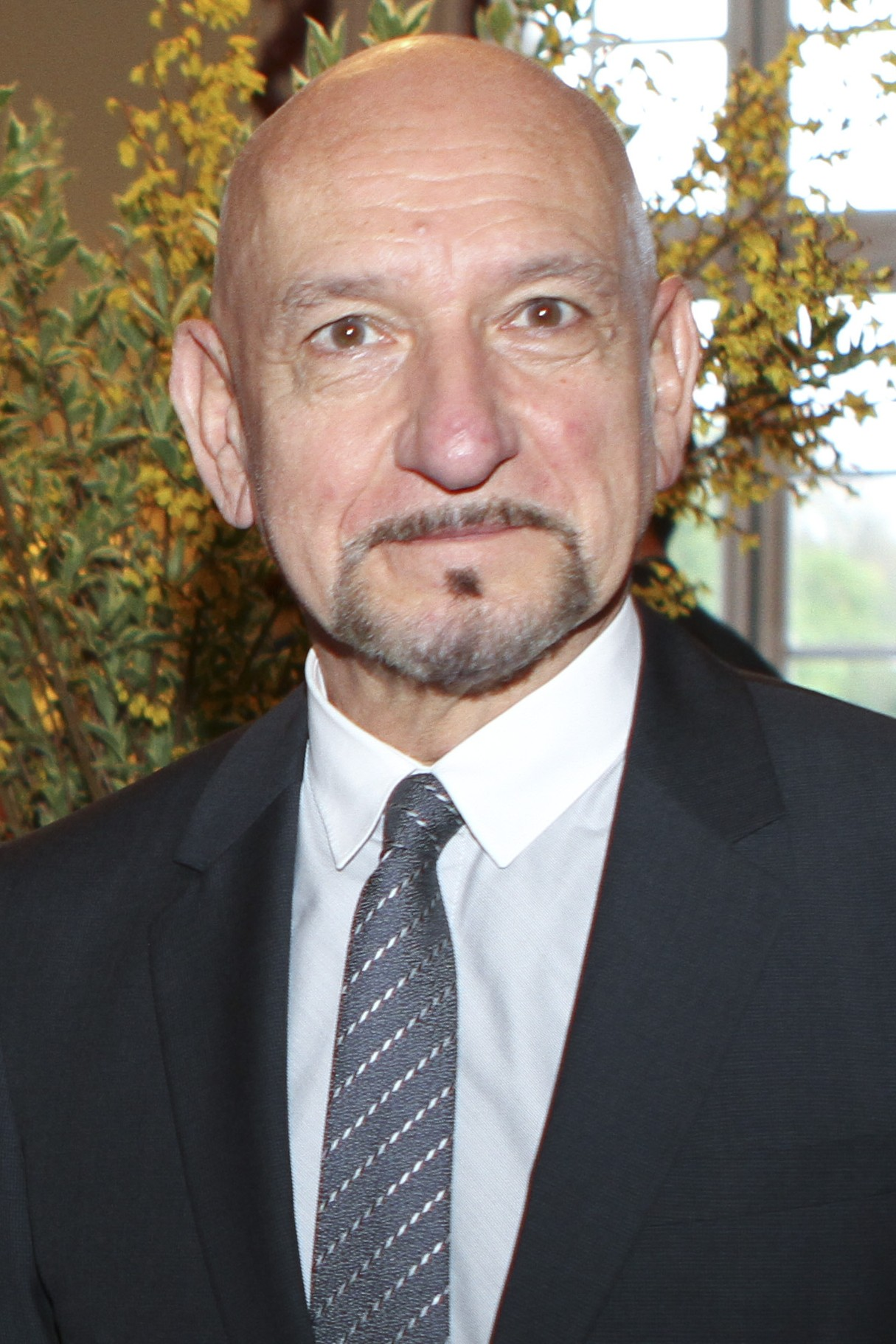
Ben Kingsley, Jury President

The following people were announced as being on the jury for the festival:

- Ben Kingsley, British actor - Jury President
- Senta Berger, Austrian actress and producer
- Li Cheuk-to, artistic director of the Hong Kong International Film Festival
- Leslie Cheung, Hong Kong actor and musician
- Héctor Olivera, Argentinian filmmaker
- Helmut Dietl, German filmmaker
- Brigitte Roüan, French filmmaker and actress
- Annette Insdorf, French producer
- Maya Turovskaya, Ukrainian historian and film critic
- Maurizio Nichetti, Italian actor, filmmaker and producer
- Michael Williams-Jones, British president of Miramax Films

== Official Sections ==
=== Main Competition ===
The following films were for the main competition:

English title	Original title	Director(s)	Country
Barbara		Nils Malmros	Denmark, Faroe Islands
The Big Lebowski		Joel Coen	United States, United Kingdom
The Big Mambo	Das Mambospiel	Michael Gwisdek	Germany
The Boxer (opening film)		Jim Sheridan	United States, Ireland
The Boys		Rowan Woods	Australia
The Butcher Boy		Neil Jordan	United States, Ireland
Central Station	Central do Brasil	Walter Salles	Brazil, France
The Commissioner		George Sluizer	United Kingdom, United States, France, Germany, Belgium
Country of the Deaf	Страна глухих	Valery Todorovsky	Russia, France
Girls' Night		Nick Hurran	United Kingdom
Good Will Hunting		Gus Van Sant	United States
Hold You Tight	愈快樂愈墮落	Stanley Kwan	Hong Kong
I Want You		Michael Winterbottom	United Kingdom
Jackie Brown		Quentin Tarantino	United States
Left Luggage		Jeroen Krabbé	United States, Netherlands, Belgium, United Kingdom
The Naked Eye	La mirada del otro	Vicente Aranda	Spain
The Perfect Guy	Jeanne et le Garçon formidable	Olivier Ducastel, Jacques Martineau	France
Sada	戯作・阿部定の生涯	Nobuhiko Obayashi	Japan
Same Old Song	On connaît la chanson	Alain Resnais	France, United Kingdom, Switzerland
The Sound of One Hand Clapping		Richard Flanagan	Australia
Sweet Degeneration	放浪	Lin Cheng-sheng	Taiwan
The Best Man	Il testimone dello sposo	Pupi Avati	Italy
Too Much (Little) Love	Trop (peu) d'amour	Jacques Doillon	France
Wag the Dog		Barry Levinson	United States
Xiu Xiu: The Sent Down Girl	天浴	Joan Chen	Hong Kong, United States, Taiwan

== Official Awards ==
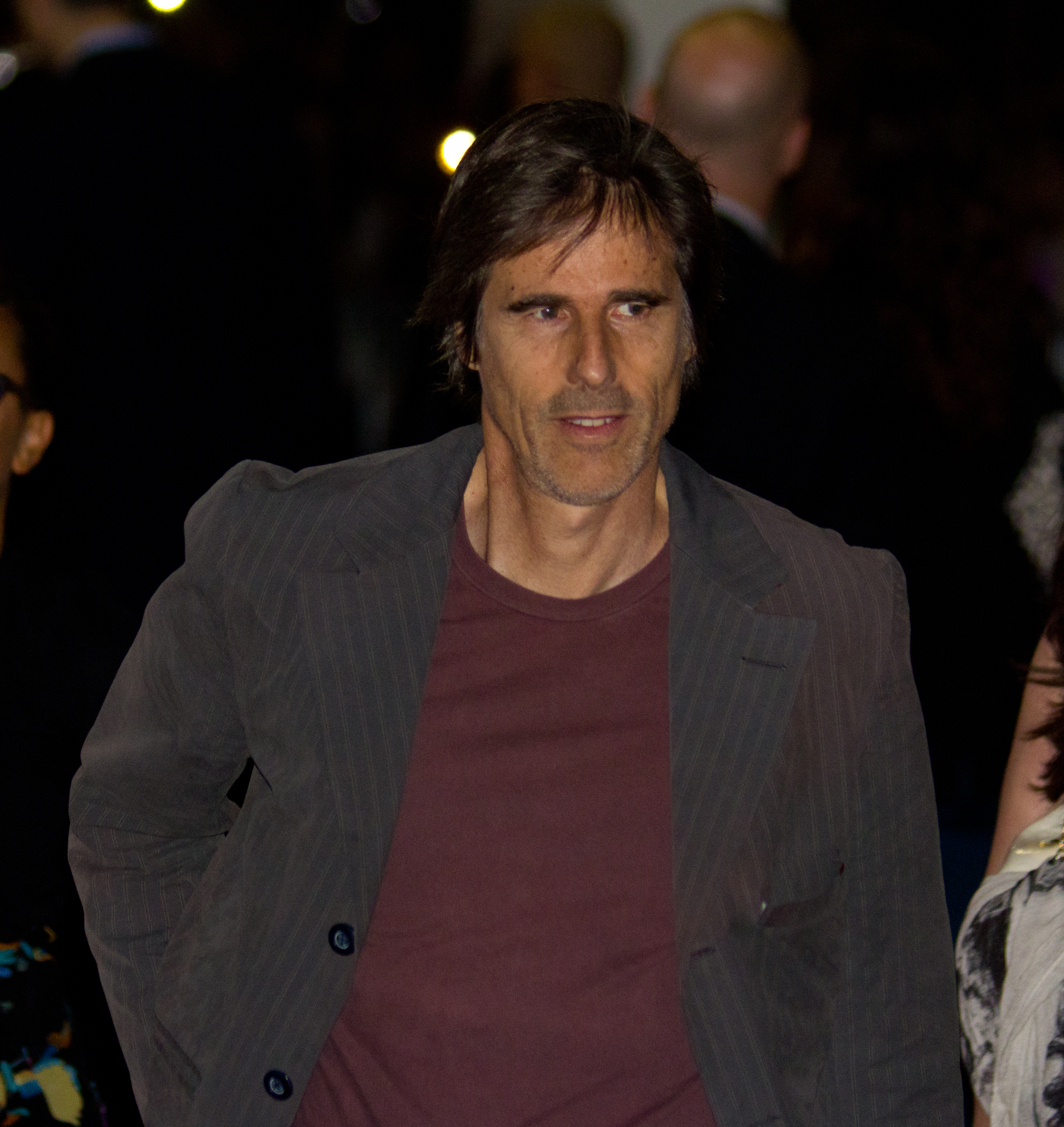
Walter Salles, winner of the Golden Bear at the festival

=== Main Competition ===
The following prizes were awarded by the Jury:

- Golden Bear: Central Station by Walter Salles
- Silver Bear Special Jury Prize: Wag the Dog by Barry Levinson
- Silver Bear for Best Director: Neil Jordan for The Butcher Boy
- Silver Bear for Best Actress: Fernanda Montenegro for Central Station
- Silver Bear for Best Actor: Samuel L. Jackson for Jackie Brown
- Silver Bear for an Outstanding Single Achievement: Matt Damon for Good Will Hunting
- Silver Bear for an outstanding Artistic Contribution: Alain Resnais for Same Old Song
- Alfred Bauer Prize: Hold You Tight by Stanley Kwan
- Honourable Mention:
  - Sławomir Idziak for I Want You
  - Isabella Rossellini for Left Luggage
  - Eamonn Owens for The Butcher Boy

=== Honorary Golden Bear ===
- Catherine Deneuve

=== Berlinale Camera ===
- Carmelo Romero
- Curt Siodmak

== Independent Awards ==
=== Blue Angel Award ===
- Left Luggage by Jeroen Krabbé

=== FIPRESCI Award ===
- Sada by Nobuhiko Obayashi
