= L'été en pente douce =

L'été en pente douce (Summer on a gentle slope)
- Directed by: Gérard Krawczyk
- Written by: Gérard Krawczyk; Jean-Paul Lilienfeld from the novel by Pierre Pelot
- Produced by: Jean-Marie Duprez
- Starring: Jean-Pierre Bacri; Jacques Villeret; Pauline Lafont; Jean Bouise; Guy Marchand
- Cinematography: Michel Cénet
- Edited by: Marie-Josèphe Yoyotte
- Music by: Roland Vincent
- Distributed by: Acteurs Auteurs Associés
- Release date: 29 April 1987
- Running time: 96 minutes
- Country: France
- Language: French

L'été en pente douce (Summer on a gentle slope) is a French film, an adaptation of a novel by Pierre Pelot. It was directed by Gérard Krawczyk, and released in 1987.

== Synopsis ==
Following the death of his mother, Stephane Leheurt, nicknamed Fane (Jean-Pierre Bacri), rejoins his mentally handicapped brother Maurice, nicknamed Mo, (Jacques Villeret) at their mother's house. He wants a quiet life with his brother and his pretty girlfriend Lilas (Pauline Lafont). But Voke the neighbouring garage owner has eyes on the house, and on Lilas.

== Cast ==
- Jacques Villeret - Maurice Leheurt, nicknamed Mo
- Jean-Pierre Bacri - Stéphane Leheurt, Fane
- Pauline Lafont - Lilas
- Jean Bouise - Olivier Voke
- Guy Marchand - André Voke
- Jean-Paul Lilienfeld - Shawenhick
- Jacques Mathou - Jeannot
- Dominique Besnehard - Leval
- Claude Chabrol - the priest
- Patrick Braoudé - the policeman
- Charles Varel - the packer
