= Gabber Lover =

- Directed by: Anna Cazenave Cambet
- Screenplay by: Anna Cazenave-Cambet; Marie-Stéphane Imbert; Marlène Poste
- Produced by: Édouard Lalanne de Saint-Quentin
- Starring: Laurie Reynal; Mila Lendormy
- Cinematography: Pauline Sicard
- Edited by: Joris Laquittant
- Music by: Charles Miette
- Production company: La Fémis
- Release date: 18 May 2016 (Cannes)
- Running time: 13 minutes
- Country: France
- Language: French

Gabber Lover is a 2015 French short film directed by Anna Cazenave Cambet.

It was selected as a student film at the Cinéfondation at the 2016 Cannes Film Festival where she won the Queer Palm for best short film.

== Synopsis ==
In the 2000s, two 13-year-old girls, Mila and Laurie, participate in a gabber festival by a lake in Nérac. Mila is in love with Laurie and wants to tell her.

== Cast ==
- Laurie Reynal: Laurie
- Mila Lendormy: Mila
- Mohamed El Brinssi: the older brother
- Victorien Cacioppo: the boy in the car

== About the film ==
Gabber Lover is a film school project, shot in November 2015 near Nérac, in Lot-et-Garonne. Its director, Anna Cazenave-Cambet, learned via a phone call that the short film has been selected for the Cinéfondation at the Cannes Film Festival.

The film came from the director's desire, while a third-year student in the directing program at La Fémis, to capture landscapes from her childhood—-the forest, the silence—-a natural silence juxtaposed with the film's soundtrack of gabber music representing teenage violence. It is not based on a true story or something the director witnessed, but rather an interpretation of what a teenage love story can be, with all its violence and "chaos".

A "coming out" film, it was screened by Cinéfondation in the Buñuel Room on May 18, 2016.

== Awards ==
- Queer Palm for Best Short Film at the 2016 Cannes Film Festival
- Special Jury Mention at the Cabourg Film Festival 2016
- 36th International Film Schools Festival Munich: "Young Talent Award" presented by the Society for the Protection of Cinema and Television Producers' Rights (VFF)
- In&Out Film Festival 2017: Esperluette Award for Best Short Film

== Bibliography ==
- Béars, Guillaume (2016-05-22). "Anna Cazenave-Cambet, une Néracaise à Cannes". La Dépêche - en ligne (in French).
- Belga News Agency (2016). "Cannes 2016 – « Les Vies de Thérèse » remporte la Queer Palm". Metro - en ligne (in French).
- Aliénor Lecomte, Bref (Retrieved 2021-07-16)
