= Drôle de Félix =

- Original poster
- Directed by: Olivier Ducastel; Jaques Martineau
- Written by: Olivier Ducastel; Jacques Martineau
- Produced by: Philippe Martin
- Starring: Sami Bouajila
- Cinematography: Matthieu Poirot-Delpech
- Edited by: Sabine Mamou
- Distributed by: Pyramide Distribution
- Release date: 19 April 2000
- Running time: 95 mins
- Country: France
- Language: French
- Budget: €2.8 million

Drôle de Félix (literally meaning Comedy of Félix or Amazing Félix; also known as (The) Adventures of Felix) is a 2000 French film, a road movie written and directed by Olivier Ducastel and Jacques Martineau. It stars Sami Bouajila as the title character.

== Plot ==
Félix, a young gay man of Arab descent, living in Dieppe, is currently unemployed and HIV positive. While cleaning out the apartment of his recent deceased mother, he discovers that the father he never knew is living in Marseille. Félix decides to hitchhike south to meet him, promising to see his lover Daniel there five days later.

Carrying with him only a small bag, his HIV medication and a rainbow kite, Félix takes to the road. He witnesses a racist attack and is beaten up by one of the assailants. He is unable, however, to bring himself to report it to the police. Later, Félix encounters a series of people who form an alternative family for him: a young gay man studying art, who Félix teaches to draw, a lone old widow, who shelters him in her house, a handsome railroad worker, with whom he has a brief sexual encounter, a mother of three children by three different fathers, and a kind, middle aged fisherman. As he calls each of these characters "brother", "cousin", "grandmother" and the like, he gradually constructs a sort of family and new understandings of life through this odyssey, no matter whether he actually meets his "true" father at the end of the story.

Félix is haunted by the racist crime he witnessed, in which he learns, the victim died, and in his inability to do anything about it. Stopping at a hotel, he sees the police arresting the murderer. When he arrives at Marseille, Felix decides not to see his father and goes instead on a romantic holiday to Tunisia with his lover.

== Cast ==
- Sami Bouajila as Félix
- Patachou as Mathilde Firmin
- Ariane Ascaride as Isabelle
- Pierre-Loup Rajot as Daniel
- Charly Sergue as Jules
- Maurice Bénichou as Fisherman
- Philippe Garziano as Railroader
- Didier Mahieu as Friend / Unionist

== Reception ==
Review aggregation website Rotten Tomatoes reported an approval rating of 69%, based on 39 reviews, with an average score of 6.3/10. At Metacritic, which assigns a normalized rating out of 100 to reviews from mainstream critics, the film received an average score of 63, based on 16 reviews, indicating "generally favorable reviews".

== Accolades ==
Award / Film Festival	Category	Recipients and nominees	Result
Berlin International Film Festival	Teddy Jury Award		Won
Berlin International Film Festival	Siegessäule Reader Award		Won
Cabourg Film Festival	Swann d'Or for Male Revelation	Sami Bouajila	Won
