= Honorary Golden Bear =

Honorary Golden Bear (Goldener Ehrenbär)
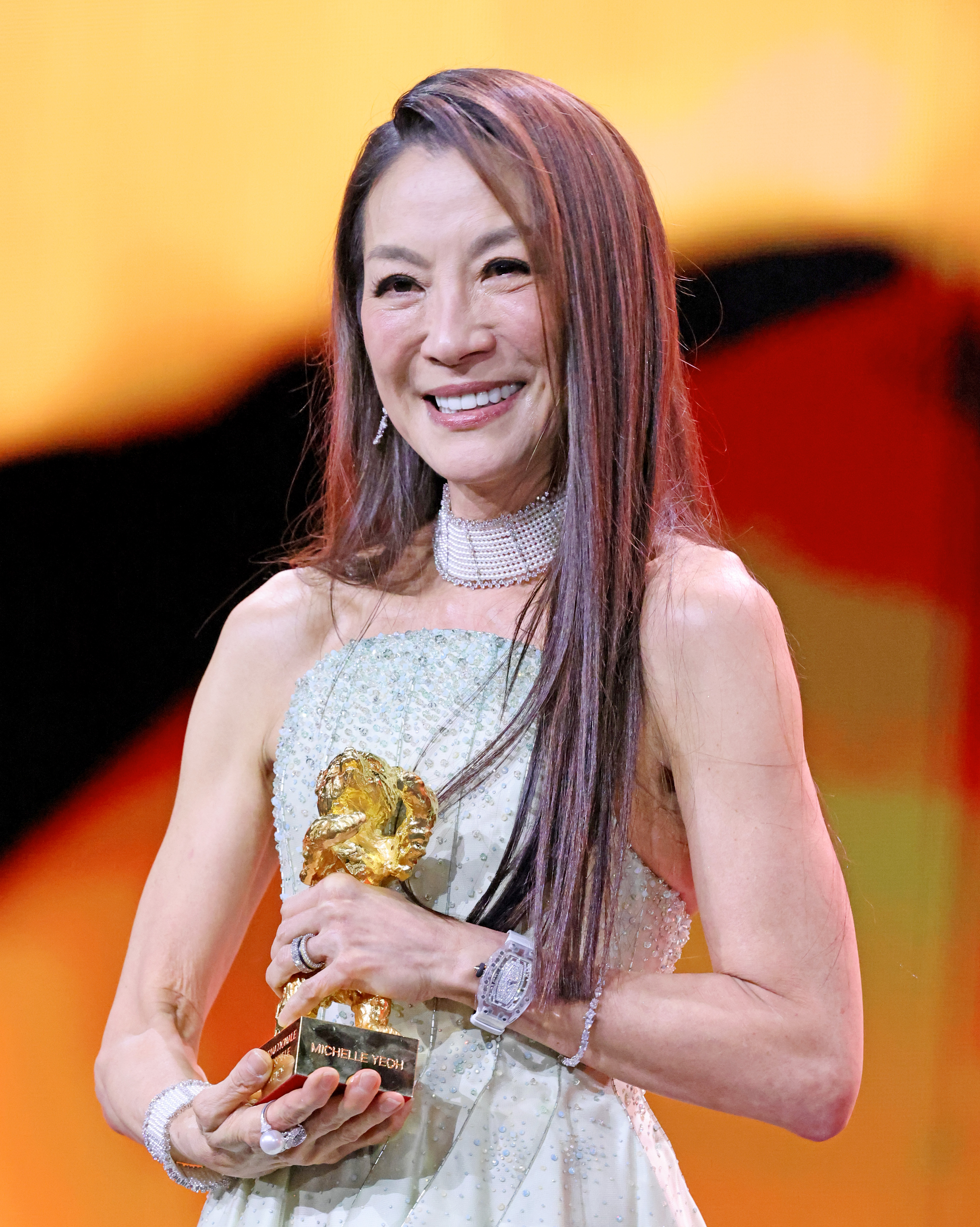
- 2026 recipient: Michelle Yeoh
- Location: Berlin
- Country: Germany
- Presented by: Berlin International Film Festival
- First award: 1982
- Currently held by: Michelle Yeoh
- Website: www.berlinale.de

The Honorary Golden Bear (German: Goldener Ehrenbär) is the Berlin International Film Festival's honorary award for lifetime achievement by important figures in the world of film.

The award has been presented annually since 1982, with exceptions being 1983, 1984, 1985, 1986, 1987, 1991, 1992, and 2021. The award is presented for an exceptional artistic career and is given to the guest of honour of the Homage.

== Recipients ==
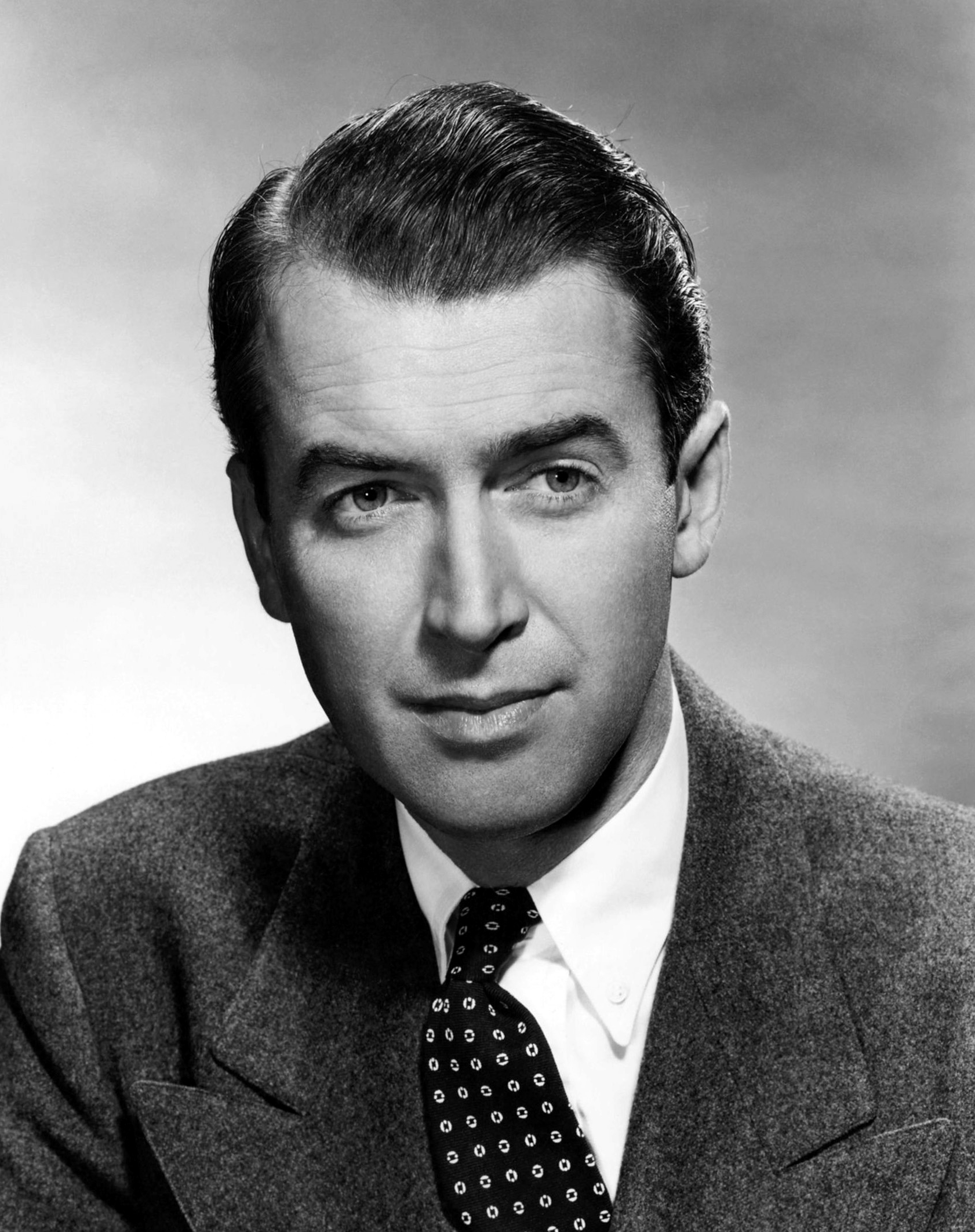
James Stewart won in 1982.

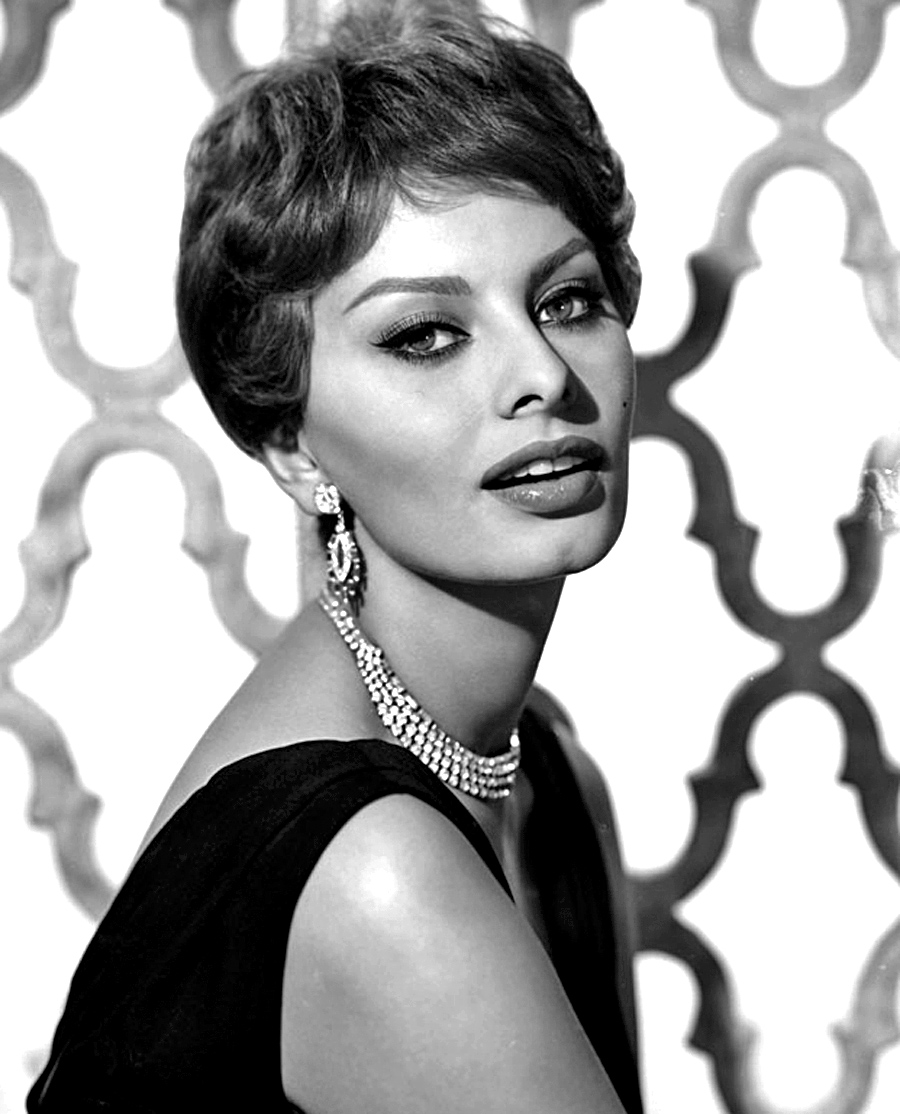
Sophia Loren won in 1994.

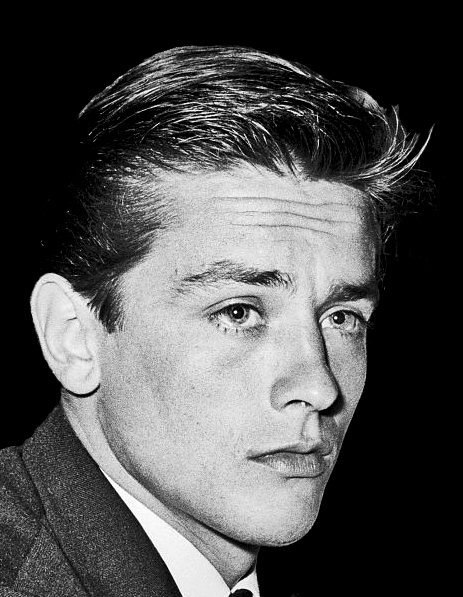
Alain Delon won in 1995.

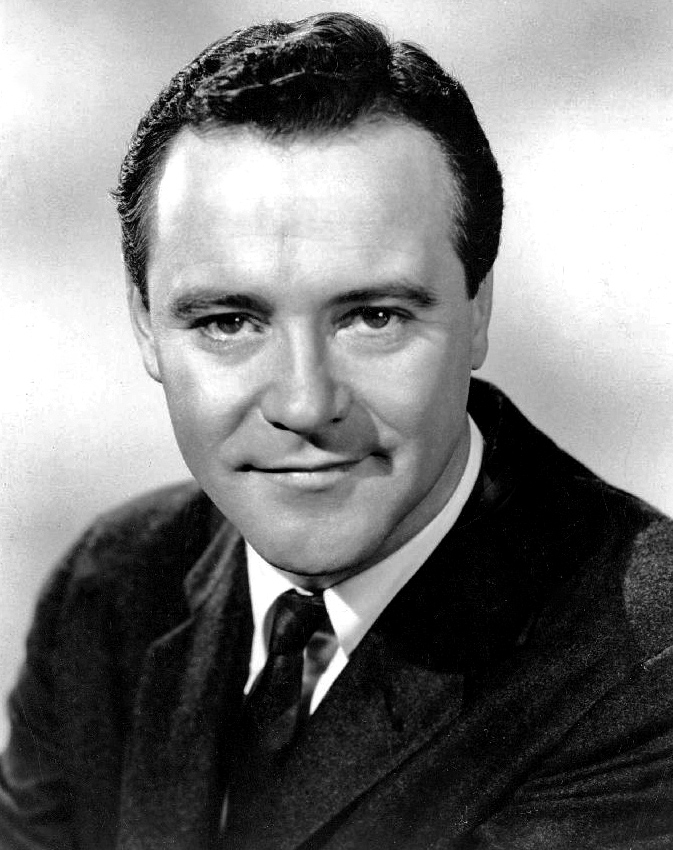
Jack Lemmon won in 1996.

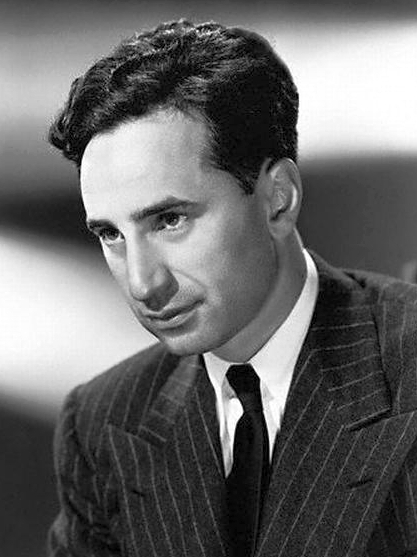
Elia Kazan won in 1996.

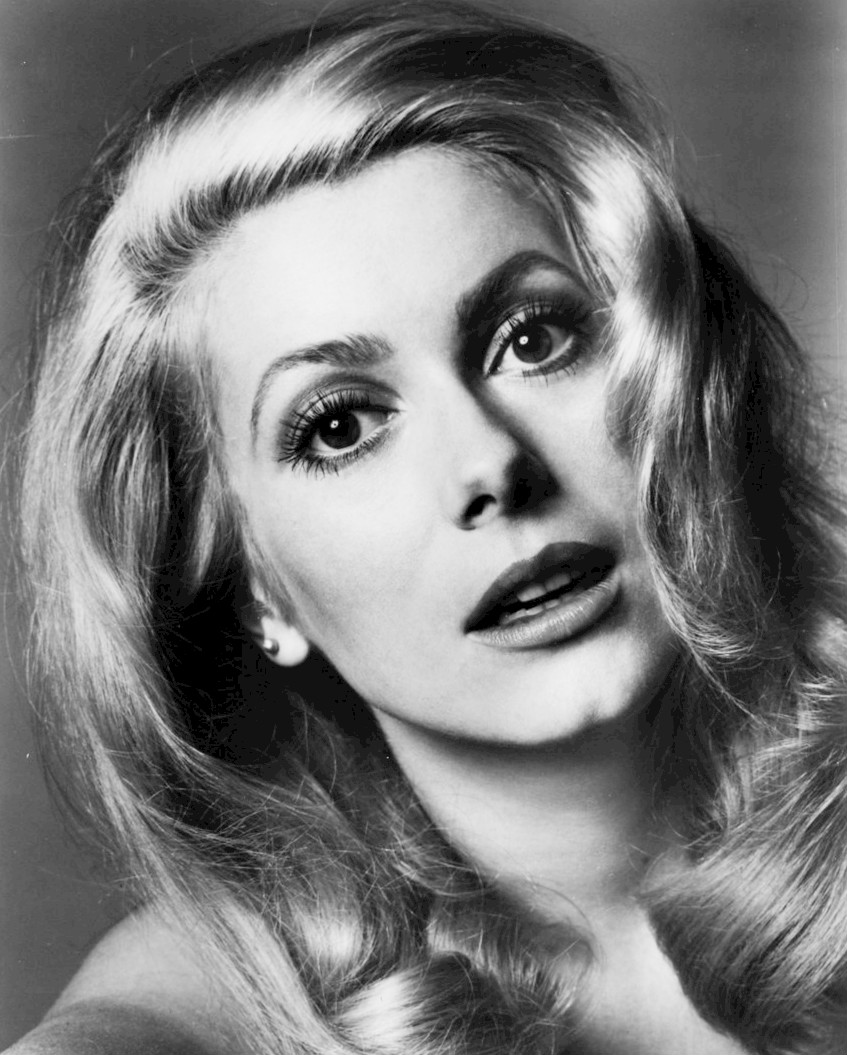
Catherine Deneuve won in 1998.

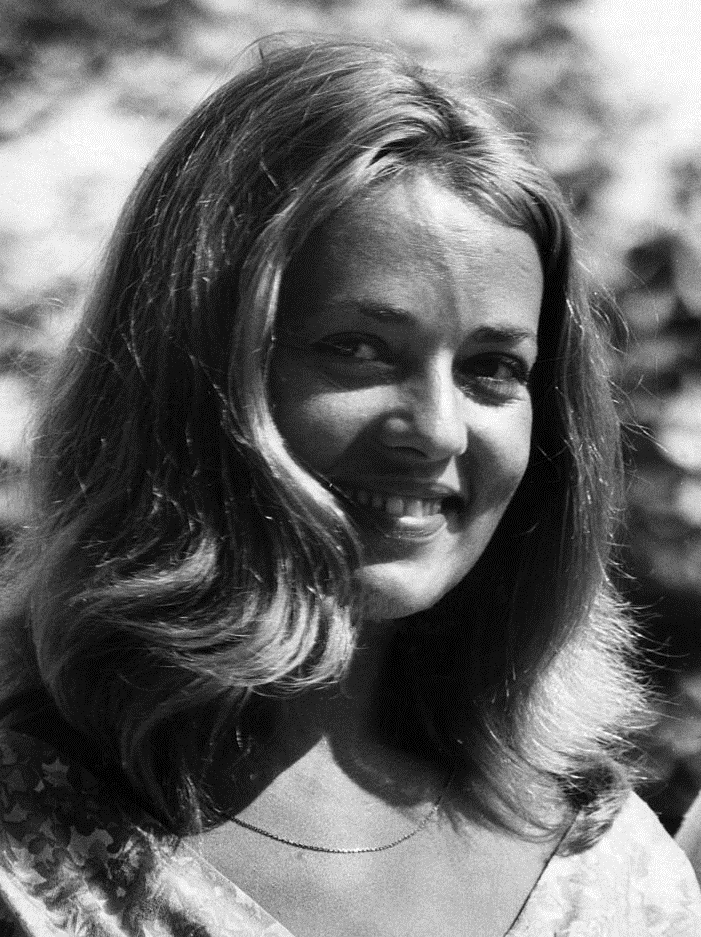
Jeanne Moreau won in 2000.

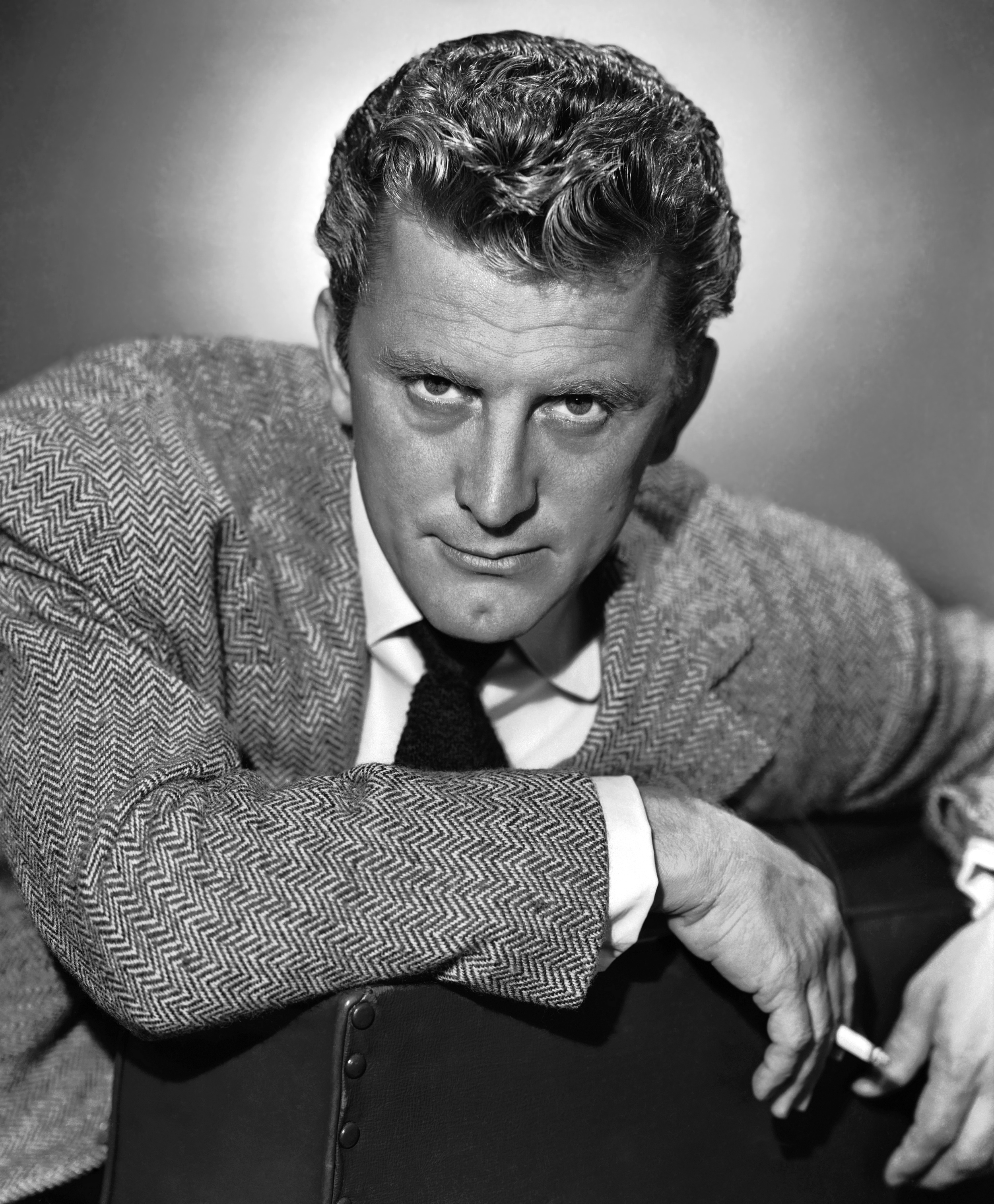
Kirk Douglas won in 2001.

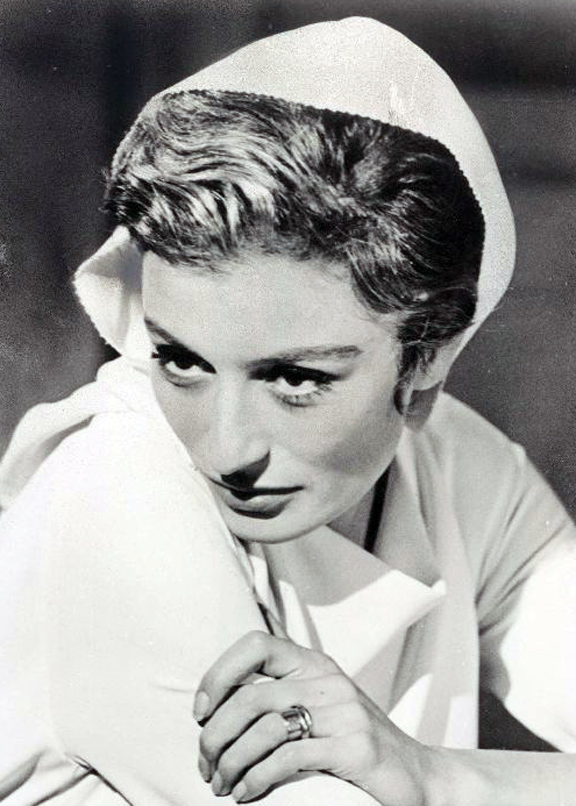
Anouk Aimée won in 2003.

=== 1980s ===
Year	Recipient	Profession	Nationality of Recipient	Ref.
1982	James Stewart	Actor	United States	
1988	Alec Guinness	Actor	England	
1989	Dustin Hoffman	Actor	United States	

=== 1990s ===
Year	Recipient	Profession	Nationality of Recipient	Ref.
1990	Oliver Stone	Filmmaker	United States	
1993	Billy Wilder	Filmmaker	United States, Austria	
1993	Gregory Peck	Actor	United States	
1994	Sophia Loren	Actress	Italy	
1995	Alain Delon	Actor	France	
1996	Jack Lemmon	Actor	United States	
1996	Elia Kazan	Filmmaker	United States	
1997	Kim Novak	Actress	United States	
1998	Catherine Deneuve	Actress	France	
1999	Shirley MacLaine	Actress	United States	

=== 2000s ===
Year	Recipient	Profession	Nationality of Recipient	Ref.
2000	Jeanne Moreau	Actress	France	
2001	Kirk Douglas	Actor and filmmaker	United States	
2002	Claudia Cardinale	Actress	Italy, Tunisia	
2002	Robert Altman	Filmmaker	United States	
2003	Anouk Aimée	Actress	France	
2004	Fernando Solanas	Filmmaker	Argentina	
2005	Im Kwon-taek	Filmmaker	South Korea	
2005	Fernando Fernán Gómez	Filmmaker, actor and writer	Spain	
2006	Andrzej Wajda	Filmmaker	Poland	
2006	Ian McKellen	Actor	England	
2007	Arthur Penn	Filmmaker and producer	United States	
2008	Francesco Rosi	Filmmaker	Italy	
2009	Maurice Jarre	Composer and conductor	France	

=== 2010s ===
Year	Recipient	Profession	Nationality of Recipient	Ref.
2010	Hanna Schygulla	Actress	Germany	
2010	Wolfgang Kohlhaase	Filmmaker	Germany	
2011	Armin Mueller-Stahl	Actor, painter and author	Germany	
2012	Meryl Streep	Actress	United States	
2013	Claude Lanzmann	Filmmaker	France	
2014	Ken Loach	Filmmaker	England	
2015	Wim Wenders	Filmmaker	Germany	
2016	Michael Ballhaus	Cinematographer	Germany	
2017	Milena Canonero	Costume Designer	Italy	
2018	Willem Dafoe	Actor	United States	
2019	Charlotte Rampling	Actress	England	

=== 2020s ===
Year	Recipient	Profession	Nationality of Recipient	Ref.
2020	Helen Mirren	Actress	England	
2022	Isabelle Huppert	Actress	France	
2023	Steven Spielberg	Filmmaker	United States	
2024	Martin Scorsese	Filmmaker	United States	
2025	Tilda Swinton	Actress	Scotland	
2026	Michelle Yeoh	Actress	Malaysia	

== See also ==
- Golden Bear
- Academy Honorary Award
- Golden Globe Cecil B. DeMille Award
- Honorary César
- Honorary Goya Award
- Nastro d'Argento Lifetime Achievement Award
- Honorary Palme d'Or
