= Family Tree (2010 film) =

- Film poster
- French: L'arbre et la forêt
- Directed by: Olivier Ducastel; Jacques Martineau
- Written by: Olivier Ducastel; Jacques Martineau
- Produced by: Kristina Larsen; Gilles Sandoz
- Starring: Guy Marchand; Françoise Fabian
- Cinematography: Matthieu Poirot-Delpech
- Edited by: Mathilde Muyard
- Production companies: Les Films du Lendemain; Maïa Cinéma
- Distributed by: Ad Vitam
- Release dates: 16 February 2010 (Berlinale); 3 March 2010 (France)
- Running time: 97 minutes
- Country: France
- Language: French
- Budget: €1.8 million

Family Tree (French: L'Arbre et la forêt) is a 2010 French film directed by Olivier Ducastel and Jacques Martineau. It drew its inspiration in large measure from the life of Pierre Seel, an Alsatian homosexual deported to the camp of Schirmeck, who wrote of his experiences in a book, Moi, Pierre Seel, déporté homosexuel. The film won the Prix Jean Vigo in 2009.

== Cast ==
- Guy Marchand as Frédérick
- Françoise Fabian as Marianne
- Sabrina Seyvecou as Delphine
- Yannick Renier as Rémi
- François Negret as Guillaume
- Catherine Mouchet as Françoise
- Sandrine Dumas as Elisabeth
- Pierre-Loup Rajot as Charles, oldest son of Frédérick and Marianne
