= Crustacés & Coquillages =

- Theatrical release poster
- Directed by: Olivier Ducastel; Jacques Martineau
- Written by: Olivier Ducastel; Jacques Martineau
- Produced by: Nicolas Blanc
- Starring: Valeria Bruni Tedeschi; Jean-Marc Barr; Gilbert Melki; Jacques Bonnaffé; Édouard Collin; Romain Torres; Sabrina Seyvecou
- Cinematography: Matthieu Poirot-Delpech
- Edited by: Dominique Galliéni
- Music by: Philippe Miller
- Distributed by: BAC Films
- Release dates: 12 February 2005 (Berlinale); 30 March 2005 (France)
- Running time: 93 minutes
- Country: France
- Language: French
- Budget: €2.2 million
- Box office: $2.4 million

Crustacés & Coquillages (lit. "Crustaceans & shellfish") is a 2005 French comedy-drama film written and directed by Olivier Ducastel and Jacques Martineau. It is released in Northern America as Côte d'Azur and in the United Kingdom and Ireland as Cockles & Muscles.

== Plot ==
Marc has inherited the house of his late aunt on the Côte d'Azur and takes the family there on for their summer holiday, leaving their home in Paris. Charly, who has never had a girlfriend, is thought to be gay by his parents and Martin, who is gay, is also staying with them. Béatrix's lover Mathieu arrives in the village and manages to sneak opportunities to be with her. When Martin goes out one night to the local gay cruising area (an old fort on a nearby hillside) Charly follows him and meets Didier. After realizing he isn't gay, he calls Didier for help when the hot water stops working. Didier then meets Marc and they realize how much they missed each other from when Marc used to visit the area in his youth. Throughout everyone eats much fruits de mer, especially sea violets. At the end everyone sings a song called "Fruits de mer", each with their preferred partner.

== Cast ==
- Valeria Bruni-Tedeschi – Béatrix
- Gilbert Melki – Marc, her husband
- Jean-Marc Barr – Didier, a local plumber and Marc's former lover
- Jacques Bonnaffé – Mathieu, Béatrix's lover
- Romain Torres – Charly, son of Béatrix and Marc
- Édouard Collin – Martin, Charly's friend
- Sabrina Seyvecou – Laura, daughter of Béatrix and Marc
- Julien Weber – Sylvain, boyfriend of Martin

== Critical response ==
The film received mixed reviews from critics. The review aggregator Rotten Tomatoes reported that 51% of critics gave the film positive reviews, based on 51 reviews, with an average score of 5.6/10. The site's consensus reads, "This listless, albeit sexually charged, French farce is too lightweight to make any impact despite its whimsical qualities.". Metacritic reported the film had an average score of 47 out of 100, based on 19 reviews, indicating "mixed or average reviews".

== Accolades ==
Award / Film Festival	Category	Recipients and nominees	Result
Berlin International Film Festival	Europa Cinemas Label		Won
European Film Awards	People's Choice Award for Best Actor	Jean-Marc Barr	Nominated
