= The Perfect Guy (1998 film) =

1998 film

- Film poster
- Directed by: Olivier Ducastel; Jacques Martineau
- Written by: Olivier Ducastel; Jacques Martineau
- Produced by: Cyriac Auriol
- Starring: Virginie Ledoyen; Mathieu Demy; Jacques Bonnaffé; Valérie Bonneton; Frédéric Gorny; Denis Podalydès; Laurent Arcaro; Damien Dodane; Emmanuelle Goizé; Sylvain Prunenec; Michel Raskine; David Saracino
- Cinematography: Matthieu Poirot-Delpech
- Edited by: Sabine Mamou
- Music by: Philippe Miller
- Distributed by: Pyramide Distribution
- Release date: 22 April 1998
- Running time: 98 minutes
- Country: France
- Language: French
- Budget: €3.7 million
- Box office: $4,417 (US)

The Perfect Guy (French: Jeanne et le Garçon formidable), also titled Jeanne and the Perfect Guy, is a 1998 French romantic musical drama film directed by Olivier Ducastel and Jacques Martineau. It was entered into the 48th Berlin International Film Festival.

== Plot ==
Jeanne flits from boy to boy, waiting for the great love. One day, she sits in the metro opposite Olivier, and it is love at first sight. After some time, he reveals his HIV status to her.

== Cast ==
- Virginie Ledoyen as Jeanne
- Mathieu Demy as Olivier
- Jacques Bonnaffé as François
- Valérie Bonneton as Sophie
- Frédéric Gorny as Jean-Baptiste
- Denis Podalydès as Julien

== Reception ==
Review aggregation website Rotten Tomatoes reported an approval rating of 60%, based on 5 reviews, with an average score of 5.8/10.

== Accolades ==
Award / Film Festival	Category	Recipients and nominees	Result
Berlin International Film Festival	Golden Bear		Nominated
César Awards	Best First Feature Film		Nominated
César Awards	Best Original Music	Philippe Miller	Nominated
