= Anna Cazenave Cambet =

French film director (born 1990)

- Born: 13 August 1990; Nérac (France)
- Occupation: Film director
- Notable work: Gabber Lover; De l'or pour les chiens

Anna Cazenave Cambet is a French film director born on 13 August 1990, in Nérac.

== Career ==
After completing her photography studies at ETPA Toulouse, Anna Cazenave Cambert joined La Fémis (department of "Directing") from which she graduated in 2017.

Her debut feature film, De l'or pour les chiens, released in 2020, was presented at the 2021 Cannes Film Festival as part of the Critics' Week selection. She received the Youth Prize for Love Me Tender at the 39th Cabourg Film Festival.

== Filmography ==
=== Short films ===
- 2016: Gabber Lover
- 2017: lemanja – Cœur Océan

=== Feature films ===
- 2021: De l'or pour les chiens
- 2025: Love Me Tender
