= Clara Sheller =

French television series

Clara Sheller is a French television series created by Nicolas Mercier from idea by Stéphanie Tchou-Cotta. It was aired from 18 May 2005 to 3 December 2008 on France 2. The casting was completely changed between the first and second season, but the characters remained the same. The theme song was written by Mirwais and was called "Naive Song".

In the US, the series aired on Eurochannel in 2009. and on TV5Monde.

== Cast ==
- Frédéric Diefenthal as JP
- Thierry Neuvic as Gilles
- Anny Duperey as Danièle
- Charlotte de Turckheim as Marie
- Judith El Zein as Jeanne
- Bruno Salomone as David
- Francine Bergé as Danièle
- Bernard Le Coq as Gilles's Father
- Hélène Vincent as JP's Mother
- Édouard Collin as Brad
- Cyril Descours as Ben

== Accolades ==
Year	Awards	Category	Recipient	Result
2006	Globes de Cristal Award	Best TV Movie / TV Series	Nicolas Mercier	Nominated
