= 50th Berlin International Film Festival =

2000 film festival in Berlin, Germany

- Festival poster
- Opening film: The Million Dollar Hotel
- Closing film: Bossa Nova
- Location: Berlin, Germany
- Founded: 1951
- Awards: Golden Bear: Magnolia
- No. of films: 240 films
- Festival date: 9–20 February 2000
- Website: http://www.berlinale.de

Berlin International Film Festival chronology
- 51st 49th

The 50th annual Berlin International Film Festival was held from February 9 to 20, 2000. The festival opened with The Million Dollar Hotel by Wim Wenders. Bossa Nova by Bruno Barreto, screened out of competition was the closing film of the festival.

The Golden Bear was awarded to Magnolia directed by Paul Thomas Anderson. The retrospective titled Artificial People and dedicated to artificial beings and machines in the films was shown at the festival, screening films like The Golem: How He Came into the World and The Terminator. On its 50th anniversary the premieres of the films in competition at the festival moved from Zoo Palast to Theater am Potsdamer Platz located at Potsdamer Platz.

== Juries ==
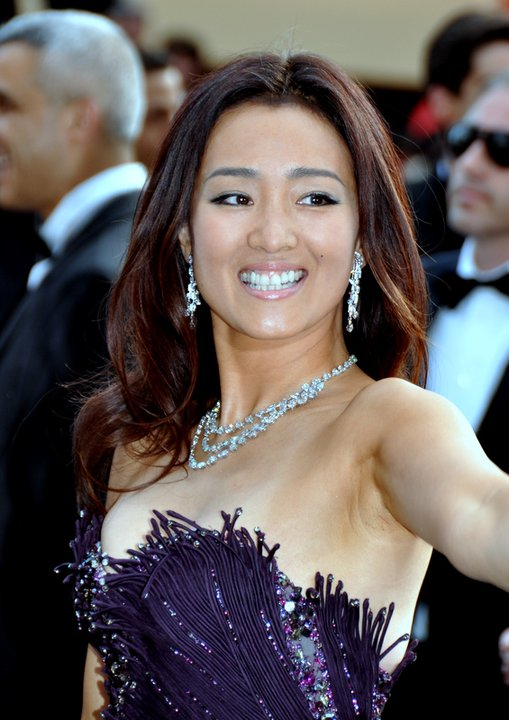
Gong Li, Jury President

The following people were announced as being on the jury for the festival:

=== Main Competition ===
- Gong Li, Chinese actress - Jury President
- Lissy Bellaiche, Danish member of the Det Danske Filminstitut
- Peter W. Jansen, German scholar and journalist
- Jean Pierre Lefebvre, Canadian filmmaker
- Marisa Paredes, Spanish actress
- Jean-Louis Piel, French producer
- Walter Salles, Brazilian filmmaker and producer
- Maria Schrader, German actress
- Andrzej Wajda, Polish filmmaker

== Official Sections ==
=== Main Competition ===
The following films were selected for the main competition:

English title	Original title	Director(s)	Country
Any Given Sunday		Oliver Stone	United States
The Beach		Danny Boyle	United States, United Kingdom
Boy's Choir	独立少年合唱団	Akira Ogata	Japan
Clouds of May	Mayis Sikintisi	Nuri Bilge Ceylan	Turkey
First Light of Dawn	Prime luci dell'alba	Lucio Gaudino	Italy
The Hurricane		Norman Jewison	United States
The Island Tales	有时跳舞	Stanley Kwan	Japan, Hong Kong, China
The Legend of Rita	Die Stille nach dem Schuß	Volker Schlöndorff	Germany
Love Me		Laetitia Masson	France
Magnolia		Paul Thomas Anderson	United States
Man on the Moon		Miloš Forman	United States, United Kingdom, Germany, Japan
The Million Dollar Hotel		Wim Wenders	United States, United Kingdom, Germany
Of Woman and Magic	La chambre des magiciennes	Claude Miller	France
The Road Home	我的父亲母亲	Zhang Yimou	China
Paradiso: Seven Days with Seven Women	Paradiso – Sieben Tage mit sieben Frauen	Rudolf Thome	Germany
Russkiy bunt	Русский бунт	Aleksandr Proshkin	Russia, France
The Sea	El mar	Agustí Villaronga	Spain
Signs and Wonders		Jonathan Nossiter	France
Sky Hook	Небеска удица	Ljubiša Samardžić	Yugoslavia, Italy
The Talented Mr. Ripley		Anthony Minghella	United States
Water Drops on Burning Rocks	Gouttes d'eau sur pierres brûlantes	François Ozon	France

== Official Awards ==
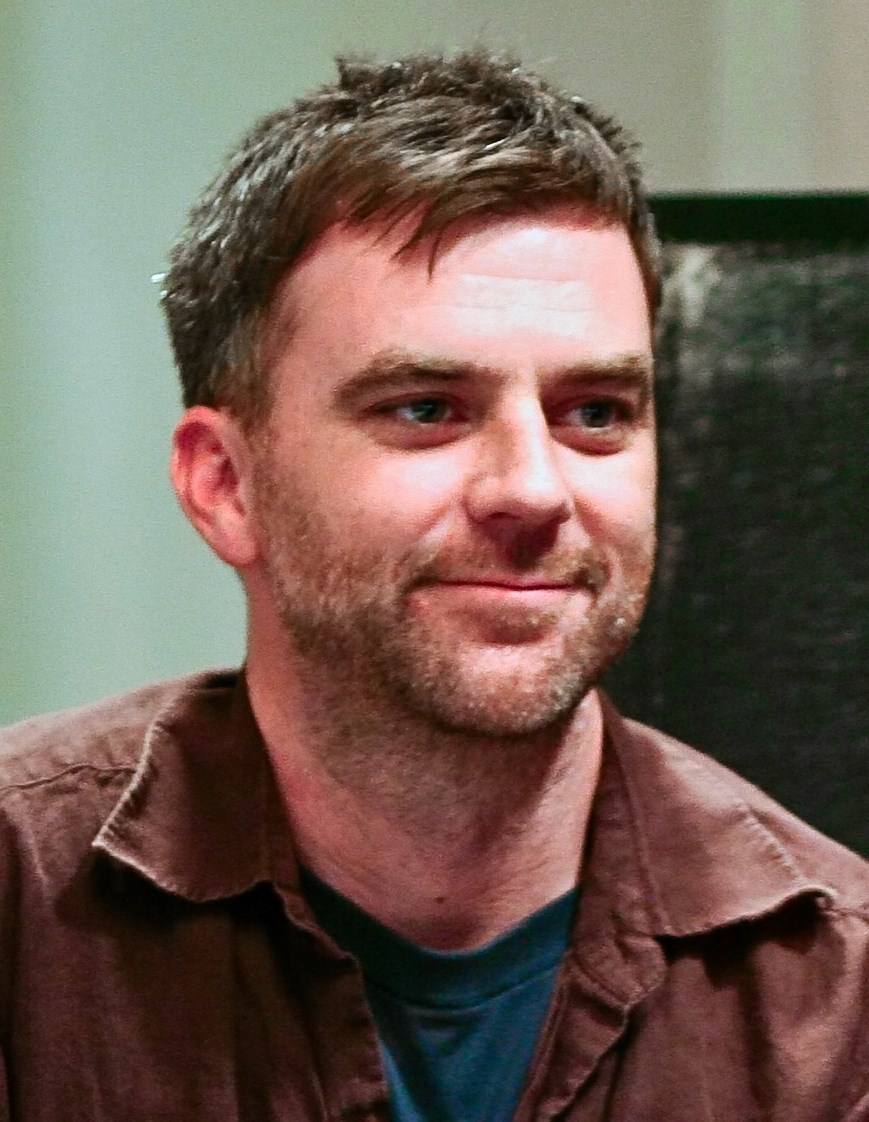
Paul Thomas Anderson, writer, director and producer of Magnolia

=== Main Competition ===
The following prizes were awarded by the Jury:

- Golden Bear: Magnolia by Paul Thomas Anderson
- Silver Bear Special Jury Prize: The Road Home by Zhang Yimou
- Silver Bear Jury Prize: The Million Dollar Hotel by Wim Wenders
- Silver Bear for Best Director: Miloš Forman for Man on the Moon
- Silver Bear for Best Actress: Bibiana Beglau and Nadja Uhl for The Legend of Rita
- Silver Bear for Best Actor: Denzel Washington for The Hurricane
- Silver Bear for an Outstanding Artistic Contribution: The Cast of Paradiso: Seven Days with Seven Women
- Alfred Bauer Prize: Boy's Choir by Akira Ogata

=== Honorary Golden Bear ===
- Jeanne Moreau

=== Berlinale Camera ===
- Kon Ichikawa
- Wolfgang Jacobsen

== Independent Awards ==
=== Blue Angel Award ===
- The Legend of Rita by Volker Schlöndorff

=== FIPRESCI Award ===
- Of Woman and Magic by Claude Miller
