= Olivier Ducastel =

French film director, screenwriter and sound editor

- Born: 23 February 1962 (age 64); Lyon, France
- Occupations: Film director, screenwriter
- Years active: 1988 – present

Olivier Ducastel (born 23 February 1962) is a French film director, screenwriter and sound editor who collaborates with his partner, Jacques Martineau.

== Life and career ==
After spending his adolescence in Rouen, Martineau moved to Paris to study film and theatre at the University of the New Sorbonne. In 1988, he directed a short musical comedy, Le Goût de plaire. In the same year, he acted as assistant to his mentor, Jacques Demy, on the film Trois places pour le 26, the last film Demy completed before his death in 1990. Ducastel spent the early 1990s working as a sound editor on various films.

In 1995, Ducastel met Jacques Martineau, and the two began a professional and personal relationship. Their first collaborative venture, Jeanne et le Garçon formidable, (an HIV/AIDS-themed musical comedy inspired by the films of Demy, and featuring Virginie Ledoyen and Demy's son Mathieu) was released in 1998. The film was entered into the 48th Berlin International Film Festival.

Ducastel and Martineau have since directed further films with gay-related storylines, including the ambitious, almost three-hour-long Nés en 68 starring Laetitia Casta and Yannick Renier.

== Filmography ==
Year	Title	Credited as			Notes
Year	Title	Director	Screenwriter	Other	Notes
1988	Trois places pour le 26			Yes	Assistant sound editor and assistant director
1989	Alexandria Again and Forever			Yes	Sound editor
1989	Le Goût de plaire	Yes	Yes		Short
1990	Outremer			Yes	Sound editor
1991	Transit			Yes	Sound mixer
1991	Comédie d'un soir			Yes	Editor; short
1992	La Fille de l'air			Yes	Assistant director
1992	Sam suffit			Yes	Assistant sound editor and assistant director
1992	Voleur d'images			Yes	Editor; short
1993	Lettre pour L...			Yes	Sound mixer
1993	Faut-il aimer Mathilde ?			Yes	Sound editor
1994	Al-Mohager			Yes	Sound editor
1994	Nous, les enfants du XXe siècle			Yes	Editor; documentary
1995	Adultery: A User's Guide			Yes	Sound editor
1995	Le Maître des éléphants			Yes	Sound editor
1998	The Perfect Guy	Yes	Yes		Nominated—Berlin Film Festival - Golden Bear; Nominated—César Award for Best First Feature Film
2000	Drôle de Félix	Yes	Yes		Berlin Film Festival - Teddy Jury Award; Berlin Film Festival - Siegessäule Readers Award
2002	My Life on Ice	Yes	Yes		Nominated—Locarno International Film Festival - Golden Leopard
2005	Crustacés et Coquillages	Yes	Yes		Berlin Film Festival - Europa Cinemas Label
2008	Born in 68	Yes	Yes		
2010	Family Tree	Yes	Yes		
2011	Juste la fin du monde	Yes			Telefilm
2016	Paris 05:59: Théo & Hugo	Yes	Yes		Berlin Film Festival - Teddy Audience Award; Guadalajara Film Festival - Premio Maguey Best Feature Film
