= Jacques Martineau =

French film director and screenwriter (born 1963)

- Born: 8 July 1963 (age 62); Montpellier, France
- Occupations: Film director, screenwriter
- Years active: 1998–present

Jacques Martineau (born 8 July 1963) is a French film director and screenwriter who works in collaboration with partner Olivier Ducastel.

== Life and career ==
After spending his adolescence in Nice, Martineau moved to Paris to study at the Ecole Normale Supérieure. After graduating, he took up a teaching post at the facility.

In 1995 Martineau met Olivier Ducastel, and the two began a professional and personal relationship. Their first collaborative venture, Jeanne et le Garçon formidable (an HIV/AIDS-themed musical comedy inspired by the films of Jacques Demy and featuring Virginie Ledoyen and Demy's son Mathieu), was released in 1998. The film was entered into the 48th Berlin International Film Festival.

Ducastel and Martineau have since directed further films with gay-related storylines, including the ambitious, almost three-hour-long Nés en 68 starring Laetitia Casta and Yannick Renier.

Martineau currently combines film work with a lectureship at Paris X University Nanterre.

== Filmography ==
Year	Title	Credited as		Notes
Year	Title	Director	Screenwriter	Notes
1998	The Perfect Guy	Yes	Yes	Nominated—Berlin Film Festival - Golden Bear; Nominated—César Award for Best First Feature Film
2000	Drôle de Félix	Yes	Yes	Berlin Film Festival - Teddy Jury Award; Berlin Film Festival - Siegessäule Readers Award
2002	My Life on Ice	Yes	Yes	Nominated—Locarno International Film Festival - Golden Leopard
2005	Crustacés et Coquillages	Yes	Yes	Berlin Film Festival - Europa Cinemas Label
2008	Born in 68	Yes	Yes	
2010	Family Tree	Yes	Yes	
2011	Juste la fin du monde	Yes		Telefilm
2016	Paris 05:59: Théo & Hugo	Yes	Yes	Berlin Film Festival - Teddy Audience Award; Guadalajara Film Festival - Premio Maguey Best Feature Film
