= Christopher Morris (photographer) =

American photojournalist (born 1958)

- Born: 1958 (age 67–68); California
- Education: 1980: AiFL photography B.Sc.
- Occupations: Photographer, film director
- Years active: 1981–present
- Organization: VII Photo Agency
- Known for: Photojournalism, war, political, portrait, fashion, art, film
- Notable work: 1989: Casualties of Just Cause; 1991: Yugoslav Wars; 1992: Slaughter in Vukovar; 2006: My America
- Awards: 1991: Olivier Rebbot award 1991: Robert Capa Gold Medal; 2005: World Press Photo
- Website: christophermorrisphotography.com

Christopher Morris (born 1958) is an American photojournalist best known for his documentary conflict photographs, being a White House photographer, a fashion photographer, and a film director.

== Life and work ==
Morris was born in 1958 in California. In 1980, he earned a photography bachelor of science degree from the Art Institute of Fort Lauderdale. He was appointed runner by Black Star director Howard Chapnick. In 1981, during six months, he documented the underground world of the New York City Subway in a photo essay published 33 years later in Time.

=== War photographer ===
In 1983, during the civil conflict in the Philippines in Manila, Morris started covering world news as documentary conflict (Note: "This is war. It's not a film, it looks like it, but it's real. I documented it for you. Can we do something?" — Christopher Morris, The Digital Journalist) photographer for Newsweek.

In 1989 - 1990, he documented the United States invasion of Panama. CBS News and RAI broadcast his short movie. He won one of his first prizes World Press Photo awards for "Casualties of Just Cause, Panama."

On March 4, 1991, near the front of the Persian Gulf War, his photograph of a U.S. Marine holding the American flag above his shoulders made the front cover of Life.

During nine years, he covered the war in the former Yugoslavia. In 1992, in Perpignan, his photo essay won the Visa d'Or award for news. However Grazia Neri wrote: "It was in Yugoslavia that the daily exposure to the war on civilians started to weigh heavily on him, on his person, on his soul, and on his photography."

"To me, that shot symbolizes the whole Yugoslav conflict of how emotional and how ridiculous the war was. You can really feel the boy's pain and the family's pain that's holding him."

— Christopher Morris, Photo District News

In May 1992, he has been named the recipient of the 1991 Robert Capa Gold Medal for his coverage of "Slaughter in Vukovar".

About the famine in Mogadishu during the war in Somalia, he said that he did not wish to live again such an experience.

In 1995, he captured movement in a photograph of a Chechen fighter running outside of the demolished presidential palace during the battle of Grozny of the first Chechen War: "At that moment that's the most dangerous place on earth. I'm not sitting there saying, 'Oh, I'm going to shoot slow shutter speeds and I'm going to zoom it!'" Morris said. "You're just shooting."

1998 was the year of the Kosovo assignment.

In 2000, the second Chechen War was the turning point of his career of "war shooter":

"With the vision in my mind of my 2 year old daughter at home whom I rarely had seen nor even photographed. This was the crystal clear moment that made me disengage from this type of photography as a profession."

— Christopher Morris, Emaho magazine

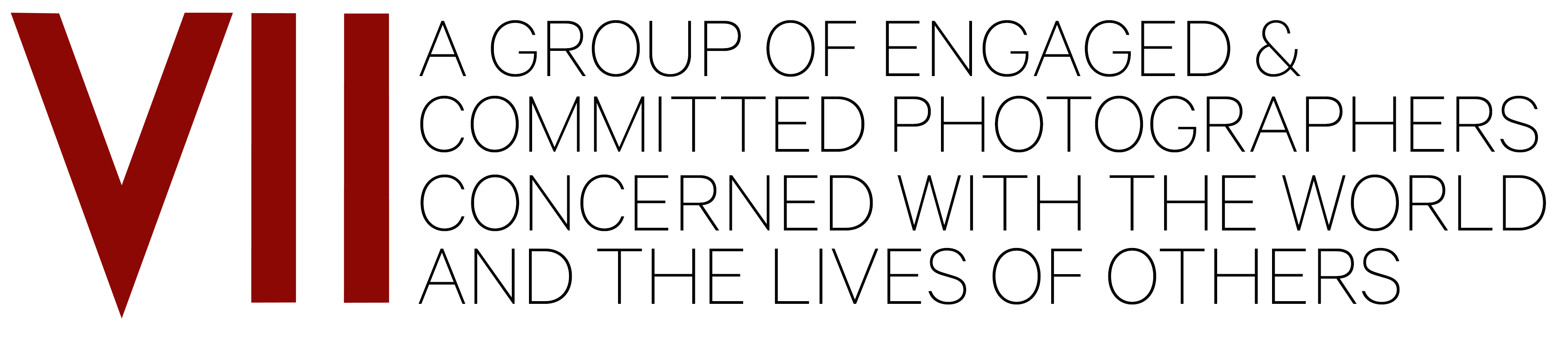
In September 2001, Morris was one of seven founding members of VII Photo Agency.

In 2001, he provided coverage of the terrorism in Yemen and the 2003 invasion of Iraq.

In 2011, he documented the Libyan Civil War and, in 2012, the Plan Colombia.

Morris, who was commissioned by Black Star in 1988 to document the Soviet–Afghan War, photographed 24 years later for Time/VII the parents of the POW Bowe Bergdahl, captured in 2009 during the War in Afghanistan.

=== Political photographer ===
In 2000, in United States, as member of the White House pool, he covered the presidencies of George W. Bush and Barack Obama for Time.

In 2013, in France, he documented the presidency of François Hollande for Le Monde. For Elle, he provided coverage of the political campaign race to conquer the Paris city hall for the first time between two women: Nathalie Kosciusko-Morizet and Anne Hidalgo who both campaigned to become Mayor of Paris.

On February 29, 2016, Morris was involved in an altercation with a United States Secret Service agent while photographing a Black Lives Matter protest at a campaign rally at Radford University in Virginia. Morris cursed at the Secret Service agent moments prior to the physical confrontation. The agent grabbing the photographer's neck with both hands and threw him into a table and onto the ground. While lying on the ground, Morris kicked at the agent. Morris grabbed at the agent's neck which Morris stated was to demonstrate the choke hold he had just experienced. The Secret Service launched an investigation into the incident, a spokesman said, and would "provide further details as warranted once additional facts surrounding the situation are known."

=== Books ===
In 2006, Morris published his photographic monograph, My America, a personal journey through portraits and landscapes into a Republican America. This book of photographies was produced while on assignment for Time covering U.S. president George W. Bush and those close to him. (Note: "The images are from the time period 2003 to 2006, when the country was really heavy into blind nationalism. In this period I felt that much of the country had wrapped its eyes so tightly with red, white and blue that it went blind." — Christopher Morris, Los Angeles Times)

In 2012, Morris continued his series about the American society with his second book Americans.

=== Movie director ===
In 2007, for The New York Times, Morris directed the short film The Gentle Shepherd about the pastor Terry Fox at the Wild West World theme park in Wichita.

For Time LightBox, in 2013, Morris directed, edited and produced the short film Conclave about people waiting, in St. Peter's Square, for the announcement of the new Pope.

In 2016, he introduced a new way to film the United States presidential candidates’ rallies using a high-speed camera, his short movies being played back in slow-motion.

=== Fashion photographer ===
In 2008, his book My America is noticed by the editor in chief of the Italian fashion magazine Amica who hired him for a Ralph Lauren shooting in New York.

"Fashion for me is about beauty and fantasy, all the complete opposites of my career, which dealt with the ugliness of war and the blind nationalism of politics.
The real difficulty in Fashion is that it’s the complete opposite of journalistic work, which is based on interpretation of reality, with fashion it becomes an interpretation of fantasy."

— Christopher Morris, Berlin Foto-Festival'13

In 2010, he photographed Carmen Jalving and Isabella Rossellini for Amica.

At the Tampa Bay Times Forum, he attended the 2012 Republican National Convention in Tampa for a shooting featuring Heidi Harrington Johnson in the editorial Beyond the conventions ("Au-delà des conventions") of the French magazine L'Officiel Paris, issue #970, published in November.

In 2013, Dior-clad Marta Dyks was his model during the Haute Couture shows in Paris for L'Officiel, issue #973 of March.

=== Portrait photographer ===
In 2008, Morris photographed the American rock band The Killers: Mark Stoermer, Brandon Flowers, Ronnie Vannucci, Jr., and Dave Keuning near Las Vegas.

In 2011, Monastery Girl featuring Ilaria Pozzi in Italy was a personal project.

In 2015, Laetitia Casta opened her doors for him in Lumio about the Paris Match editorial The independent ("L'indépendante"). This French language weekly news magazine quoted the name of the photographer directly in the title of an associated article, attracting the attention of readers who wished to know more about him.

=== Still photographer ===
In August 2015, on the shooting of the movie En Moi, Morris photographed the instant where the Dutch model Lara Stone is become actress for her first leading role of the woman. He captured on film the moment where the French actress Laetitia Casta is become film director for the first time. He was the witness of the metamorphosis of the Japanese actor Akaji Maro in his role of the man of service into the butoh-dancer in the Palais Garnier where the French Danseur Étoile Jérémie Bélingard interpreted the lover of the woman in front of the camera of the French film cinematographer Benoît Delhomme.

=== Street photographer ===
In his early career, Morris often photographed candidly in urban settings, particularly in New York City. In 2014, his 1981 series from the New York Subway was published for the first time in Time. Over a six-month period that year, Morris had embedded himself in the subway system, often riding the trains alone, but other times riding with the Guardian Angels volunteer anti-crime group.

== Publications ==
- My America. Göttingen: Steidl, 2006. ISBN 978-3-86521-201-6.
- Americans. Göttingen: Steidl, 2012. ISBN 978-3-86930-448-9.

== Exhibitions ==
- 2013: From War & Politics to Fashion, Berlin Foto-Festival

== Filmography ==
Short films directed by Morris:

=== People of Power ===
- 2006: The Dear Leader
- 2009: Obama’s War, Obama’s Burden, The New Leader
- 2011: Oval Of Power
- 2016: the candidates’ rallies for Time: Bernie, Cruz, Hillary, Jeb, Marco, Trump

=== Religion ===
In Wichita:

- 2007: The Gentle Shepherd

In Rome:

- 2011: Beatus
- 2013: Conclave in Vatican City

=== Fashion ===
For Amica:

- 2009: Givenchy, “The Dress”
- 2011: “Planet Queen” Louis Vuitton, Anastasiya Bondarenko in Chanel Couture, Dior Couture in Paris
- 2011: “Deranged” Carmen in Roberto Cavalli featuring Carmen Jalving in Èze
- 2012: Sasha with Sasha Melnycuck

For Time:

- 2012: Can You See Her featuring Katryn Kruger, Elena Bartels, Zuanna Bijoch, Irina Nikolaeva, Aline Weber, Alex Yuryeva, Olga Sherer in Paris

For Le Monde:

- 2012: “La Robe” Serkan Cura, “La Robe” Versace, Valentino’s Atelier, On Aura Tout Vu, Just Look in Paris

For InStyle UK:

- 2012: “Turn Away” for Roberto Cavalli in Milan

For Fragrance Inspirations:

- 2014: Phantom Portraits in slow motion in Paris

=== Mood ===
- 2010: The Black Tide off the Louisiana coast
- 2011: Temporal from Arles to Nice

== Awards ==
In 1990, Morris, commissioned by Black Star, won the second prize World Press Photo Award in the Spot News Series section for his work titled "Casualties of Just Cause, Panama." The following year, he earned two awards while working for Time: the Olivier Rebbot Award and the 1991 Robert Capa Gold Medal in 1992 for "Slaughter in Vukovar."

In addition to these, Morris received other honors, including the Magazine Photographer of the Year award from Pictures of the Year International in 1992. He also garnered the Infinity Photojournalist Award from the International Center of Photography in New York. His work in photojournalism was further recognized with the Visa d'Or award in the News section for his coverage of the Yugoslav Wars.

Morris earned the second prize in the National Press Photographers Association's Best Of Photojournalism Contest in the Magazine News Picture Story section in 2004. The following year, he was honored with the Feature Photography Award from the Overseas Press Club for his work "Inside the Hermit Kingdom." He achieved the first prize World Press Photo Award in the People in the Stories section.
