= James Verbicky =

Canadian-American painter

James Verbickyy
- Born: James Matthew Verbickyy; June 20, 1973 (age 53); Edmonton, Alberta, Canada
- Education: self-taught
- Known for: Contemporary painter
- Movement: abstract expressionism, abstract art, minimalist art, modern art, contemporary art
- Patrons: The Tisch family, Supermodel Lara Stone, Actors Cameron Mathison, Jane Kaczmarek and Jon Cryer, TV personality Dr. Phil, the Frank Sinatra Estate at Northridge, Smith & Wesson (Owners), The Cedarhurst Art Museum, IL,

James Verbickyy (born June 20, 1973) is an abstract mixed media artist currently living in Southern California.

== Early life ==
James Verbicky was born in Edmonton, Alberta, of Polish descent, and later lived in Calgary, Alberta, Victoria, and Vancouver, British Columbia.

== Career ==
In 2002, Verbicky packed his vintage 1963 Pontiac Catalina with artwork and drove from British Columbia, Canada, to Southern California. He struggled for many years with gaining legal status in the U.S., and in 2008, he was finally awarded the "Extraordinary Ability Greencard" (for foreign nationals with extraordinary ability in sciences, arts, education, business, or athletics) by the U.S. Government.

Verbicky was first recognized in California for a commissioned work created on a vintage Frank Gehry sphere originally housed in the Hollywood Bowl. In 2008, he was invited to join the juried exhibition of the Société Nationale des Beaux Arts (SNBA) at the Carrousel du Louvre in the Louvre in Paris, France. Verbicky was among only twelve American-based artists invited to join the SNBA show, which had been in existence for over a hundred years but had only the year before began accepting American (or American-based) delegates. Verbicky exhibited "Awake Concrete" in December 2008 at the Louvre Museum.

Verbicky's work is exhibited widely in galleries around the U.S. and abroad. His collectors include the Tisch family, television personality Dr. Phil, Calvin Klein Supermodel Lara Stone, actors Cameron Mathison, Jon Cryer, Jane Kaczmarek, and the Frank Sinatra Estate in Northridge.

In 2010, Verbicky unveiled a new collection of three-dimensional sculptural paintings which deviate from his established expressionistic past and explore a more conceptual, yet still abstract, style. This latest collection, dubbed 'the media paintings' are pioneered by the "Citta Samtana" series (Sanskrit words which translate loosely into "mental continuum" or mindstream). These works are constructed from antique and vintage paper and magazines from all over the world, and intend to communicate and capture cultural bombardment of media throughout the decades.

== Awards and accolades ==
– Granted "Extraordinary Ability Green Card" by the U.S. government.
– Invitation, the Société Nationale des Beaux-Arts (SNBA) at the Louvre, Paris, France.
