= 2016 Cannes Film Festival =

- Official poster of the 69th Cannes Film Festival featuring a still from Jean-Luc Godard's 1963 film Contempt, with Michel Piccoli ascending the Casa Malaparte
- Opening film: Café Society
- Closing film: I, Daniel Blake
- Location: Cannes, France
- Founded: 1946
- Awards: Palme d'Or: I, Daniel Blake
- Hosted by: Laurent Lafitte
- No. of films: 21 (In Competition)
- Festival date: 11–22 May 2016
- Website: festival-cannes.com/en

Cannes Film Festival
- 2017 2015

The 69th Cannes Film Festival took place from 11 to 22 May 2016. Australian filmmaker George Miller was the president of the jury for the main competition. British filmmaker Ken Loach won the Palme d'Or, the festival's top prize, for a second time with the drama film I, Daniel Blake. At a press conference, Loach said that he was "quietly stunned" to win.

The official poster pays homage to Jean-Luc Godard's Contempt (1963), featuring a still of Michel Piccoli ascending the Casa Malaparte. French actor Laurent Lafitte was the host for the opening and closing ceremonies.

The festival opened with Café Society by Woody Allen.

== Juries ==
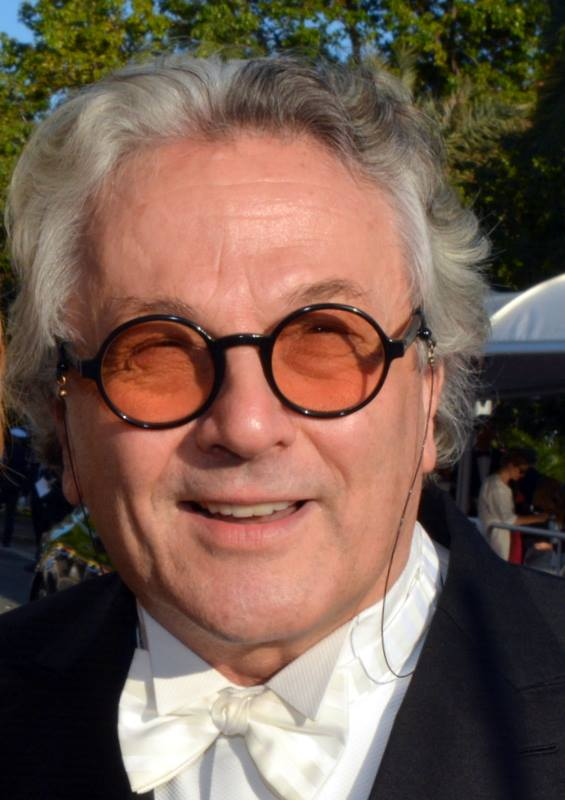
George Miller, Main competition jury president

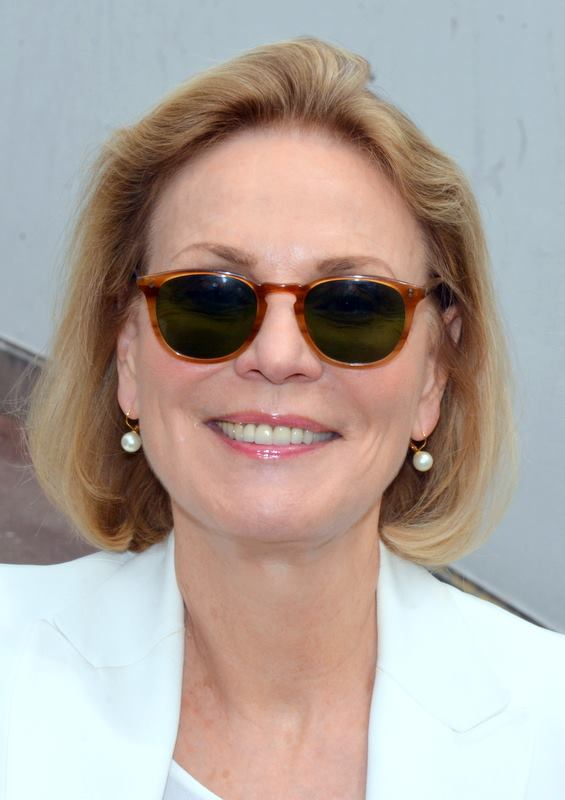
Marthe Keller, Un Certain Regard jury president

=== Main competition ===
- George Miller, Australian filmmaker – Jury President
- Arnaud Desplechin, French filmmaker
- Kirsten Dunst, American actress
- Valeria Golino, Italian actress and filmmaker
- Mads Mikkelsen, Danish actor
- László Nemes, Hungarian filmmaker
- Vanessa Paradis, French actress and singer
- Katayoon Shahabi, Iranian film producer
- Donald Sutherland, Canadian actor

=== Un Certain Regard ===
- Marthe Keller, Swiss actress – Jury President
- Jessica Hausner, Austrian filmmaker
- Diego Luna, Mexican actor and filmmaker
- Ruben Östlund, Swedish filmmaker
- Céline Sallette, French actress

=== Caméra d'or ===
- Catherine Corsini, French filmmaker and actress – Jury President
- Jean-Christophe Berjon, French film critic
- Jean-Marie Dreujou, French cinematographer
- Isabelle Frilley, French CEO of Titra Film
- Alexander Rodnyansky, Ukrainian film producer

=== Cinéfondation and Short Films Competition ===
- Naomi Kawase, Japanese filmmaker – Jury President
- Marie-Josée Croze, Franco-Canadian actress
- Jean-Marie Larrieu, French filmmaker
- Santiago Loza, Argentine filmmaker and playwright
- Radu Muntean, Romanian filmmaker

=== Independent Juries ===
==== Nespresso Grand Prize (Critics' Week) ====
- Valérie Donzelli, French filmmaker and actress – Jury President
- Nadav Lapid, Israeli filmmaker
- David Robert Mitchell, American filmmaker
- Santiago Mitre, Argentine filmmaker
- Alice Winocour, French filmmaker

==== L'Œil d'or ====
- Gianfranco Rosi, Italian filmmaker – Jury President
- Anne Aghion, French-American filmmaker
- Natacha Régnier, Belgian actress
- Thierry Garrel, French artistic consultant and director
- Amir Labaki, Brazilian film critic and curator

==== Queer Palm ====
- Olivier Ducastel and Jacques Martineau, French filmmakers – Jury Presidents
- Emilie Brisavoine, French filmmaker and actress
- João Federici, Brazilian artistic director of Festival MixBrasil
- Marie Sauvion, French film journalist

== Official Selection ==
=== Main Competition ===
The films competing in the main competition section for the Palme d'Or were announced at a press conference on 14 April 2016: The Salesman by Asghar Farhadi was added to the competition lineup on 22 April 2016. The following films were selected to compete for the Palme d'Or:

English Title	Original Title	Director(s)	Production Country
American Honey		Andrea Arnold	United Kingdom, United States
Aquarius (QP)		Kleber Mendonça Filho	Brazil, France
Elle		Paul Verhoeven	France, Germany
From the Land of the Moon	Mal de pierres	Nicole Garcia	France
Graduation	Bacalaureat	Cristian Mungiu	Romania, France, Belgium
The Handmaiden (QP)	아가씨	Park Chan-wook	South Korea
I, Daniel Blake		Ken Loach	United Kingdom, France
It's Only the End of the World (QP)	Juste la fin du monde	Xavier Dolan	Canada, France
Julieta		Pedro Almodóvar	Spain
The Last Face		Sean Penn	United States
Loving		Jeff Nichols	United States, United Kingdom
Ma' Rosa		Brillante Mendoza	Philippines
The Neon Demon (QP)		Nicolas Winding Refn	Denmark, France, United States
Paterson		Jim Jarmusch	United States, Germany, France
Personal Shopper		Olivier Assayas	France, Germany, Czech Republic, Belgium
The Salesman	فروشنده	Asghar Farhadi	Iran, France
Sieranevada		Cristi Puiu	Romania, France, Croatia, Bosnia and Herzegovina, Republic of Macedonia
Slack Bay	Ma Loute	Bruno Dumont	France, Germany
Staying Vertical (QP)	Rester Vertical	Alain Guiraudie	France
Toni Erdmann		Maren Ade	Germany, Austria
The Unknown Girl	La Fille inconnue	Jean-Pierre and Luc Dardenne	Belgium, France

(QP) indicates film eligible for the Queer Palm.

=== Un Certain Regard ===
The films competing in the Un Certain Regard section were announced at a press conference on 14 April 2016: Clash by Mohamed Diab, was announced as the opening film for the Un Certain Regard section. Hell or High Water by David Mackenzie was added to the lineup on 22 April 2016. The following films were selected:

English Title	Original Title	Director(s)	Production Country
After the Storm	海よりもまだ深く	Hirokazu Kore-eda	Japan
Apprentice		Boo Junfeng	Singapore, France, Germany, Hong Kong, Qatar
Beyond the Mountains and Hills	מעבר להרים ולגבעות	Eran Kolirin	Israel
Captain Fantastic		Matt Ross	United States
Clash (opening film)	اشتباك	Mohamed Diab	Egypt, France, Germany, United Arab Emirates
The Dancer (CdO) (QP)	La Danseuse	Stéphanie Di Giusto	France, Belgium, Czech Republic
Dogs (CdO)	Câini	Bogdan Mirică	Romania, Bulgaria, France, Qatar
The Happiest Day in the Life of Olli Mäki (CdO)	Hymyilevä Mies	Juho Kuosmanen	Finland, Sweden, Germany
Harmonium	淵に立つ	Koji Fukada	Japan
Hell or High Water		David Mackenzie	United States
Inversion	وارونگی	Behnam Behzadi	Iran
The Long Night of Francisco Sanctis (CdO)	La larga noche de Francisco Sanctis	Francisco Márquez and Andrea Testa	Argentina
Pericle	Pericle il Nero	Stefano Mordini	Italy
Personal Affairs (CdO)	עניינים אישיים	Maha Haj	Israel
The Red Turtle (CdO)	La Tortue rouge	Michael Dudok de Wit	France, Japan
The Stopover	Voir du pays	Delphine and Muriel Coulin	France, Greece
The Student	Учени́к	Kirill Serebrennikov	Russia
The Transfiguration (CdO)		Michael O'Shea	United States

(CdO) indicates film eligible for the Caméra d'Or as directorial debut feature.
(QP) film eligible for the Queer Palm.

=== Out of Competition ===
The following films were selected to screen out of competition:

English Title	Original Title	Director(s)	Production Country
The BFG		Steven Spielberg	United States, India
Café Society (opening film)		Woody Allen	United States
Money Monster		Jodie Foster	United States
The Nice Guys		Shane Black	United States
The Wailing	곡성	Na Hong-jin	South Korea
Midnight Screenings
Blood Father		Jean-François Richet	France
Gimme Danger (ŒdO)		Jim Jarmusch	United States
Train to Busan	부산행	Yeon Sang-ho	South Korea

(ŒdO) indicates film eligible for the Œil d'or as documentary.

=== Special Screenings ===
The following films were selected to receive Special Screening:

English Title	Original Title	Director(s)	Production Country
Le Cancre (QP)		Paul Vecchiali	France
Chouf	شوف	Karim Dridi	France, Tunisia
The Death of Louis XIV	La Mort de Louis XIV	Albert Serra	France, Portugal, Spain
Exile (ŒdO)	Exil	Rithy Panh	Cambodia, France
Fool Moon	La Forêt de Quinconces	Grégoire Leprince-Ringuet	France
Hands of Stone		Jonathan Jakubowicz	United States, Panama
Hissein Habré, A Chadian Tragedy (ŒdO)	Hissein Habré, une tragédie tchadienne	Mahamat-Saleh Haroun	Chad
The Last Resort (ŒdO)	L'ultima spiaggia	Thanos Anastopoulos and Davide Del Degan	Italy
Peshmerga		Bernard-Henri Lévy	France
Wrong Elements (ŒdO)		Jonathan Littell	France, Belgium

(ŒdO) film eligible for the Œil d'or as documentary.
(QP) film eligible for the Queer Palm.

=== Cinéfondation ===
The Cinéfondation section focuses on films made by students at film schools. The following 18 entries (14 fiction films and 4 animation films) were selected out of 2,300 submissions. More than one-third of the films selected represent schools participating in Cinéfondation for the first time. It is also the first time that a film representing Bosnian and Venezuelan film schools have been selected. More than half of the films selected were directed by women.

English Title	Original Title	Director(s)	School
1 Kilogram		Park Young-Ju	K-ARTS, South Korea
The Alan Dimension		Jac Clinch	NFTS, United Kingdom
All Rivers Run to the Sea	Toate fluviile curg în mare	Alexandru Badea	UNATC, Romania
Anna		Or Sinai	Sam Spiegel Film and Television School, Israel
Aram		Fereshteh Parnian	Lumière University Lyon 2, France
Business		Malena Vain	Universidad del Cine, Argentina
Fine	Dobro	Marta Hernaiz Pidal	film.factory, Bosnia and Herzegovina
Gabber Lover		Anna Cazenave Cambet	La Fémis, France
The Guilt, Probably	La culpa probablemente	Michael Labarca	Universidad de los Andes, Venezuela
In the Hills		Hamid Ahmadi	London Film School, United Kingdom
Nest	Gudh	Saurav Rai	Satyajit Ray Film and Television Institute, India
The Noise of Licking	A nyalintás nesze	Nadja Andrasev	MOME, Hungary
The Reasons in the World	Las razones del mundo	Ernesto Martínez Bucio	CCC, Mexico
The Sleeping Saint	La santa che dorme	Laura Samani	Centro Sperimentale di Cinematografia, Italy
Somewhere	Ailleurs	Mélody Boulissière	E.N.S.A.D., France
Submarine		Mounia Akl	Columbia University School of the Arts, United States
Trash	Poubelle	Alexandre Gilmet	INSAS, Belgium
Whatever The Weather	Bei Wind und Wetter	Remo Scherrer	Hochschule Luzern – Design & Kunst, Switzerland

=== Short Films Competition ===
Out of 5,008 entries, the following films were selected to compete for the Short Film Palme d'Or.

English Title	Original Title	Director(s)	Production Country
4:15 P.M. The End of the World	4:15 PM Sfarsitul Lumii	Catalin Rotaru and Gabi Virginia Sarga	Romania
Après Suzanne		Félix Moati	France
Dreamlands		Sarah Dunlop	United Kingdom
Fight on a Swedish Beach		Simon Vahlne	Sweden
The Girl Who Danced with the Devil	A Moça que Dançou com o Diabo	João Paulo Miranda Maria	Brazil
Imago		Raymund Ribay Gutierrez	Philippines
Law of the Lamb	صوف على الظهر	Lotfi Achour	Tunisia, France
Mother	Madre	Simón Mesa Soto	Colombia
The Silence	Il Silenzio	Farnoosh Samadi Frooshani and Ali Asgari	Italy
Timecode		Juanjo Giménez	Spain

=== Cannes Classics ===
The full line-up for the Cannes Classics section was announced on 20 April 2016. With the screening of the first prize of the Fipresci, for the celebration of the 70th anniversary of the International Federation of Film Critics awards.

English Title	Original Title	Director(s)	Production Country
Restored Prints
Adieu Bonaparte (1985)	وداعاً بونابرت	Youssef Chahine	Egypt, France
The Day Shall Dawn (1959)	جاگو ہوا سویرا	A. J. Kardar	Pakistan
Dekalog: Five (1988)	Dekalog, pięć	Krzysztof Kieślowski	Poland
Dekalog: Six (1988)	Dekalog, sześć	Krzysztof Kieślowski	Poland
Howards End (1992)		James Ivory	United Kingdom, Japan, United States
Indochine (1992)		Régis Wargnier	France
Lady Killer (1937)	Gueule d'amour	Jean Grémillon	France, Germany
The Last Chance (1945)	Die letzte Chance	Leopold Lindtberg	Switzerland
Love (1971)	Szerelem	Károly Makk	Hungary
Masculin Féminin (1966)	Masculin féminin: 15 faits précis	Jean-Luc Godard	France, Sweden
Memories of Underdevelopment (1968)	Memorias del subdesarrollo	Tomás Gutiérrez Alea	Cuba
Momotaro, Sacred Sailors (1945)	桃太郎 海の神兵	Mitsuyo Seo	Japan
One-Eyed Jacks (1961)		Marlon Brando	United States
The Pit and the Pendulum (1961)		Roger Corman	United States
Rendezvous in July (1949)	Rendez-vous de juillet	Jacques Becker	France
Santi-Vina (1954)		Thavi Na Bangchang	Thailand
Solaris (1972)	Солярис	Andrei Tarkovsky	Soviet Union
Sorcerer (1977)		William Friedkin	United States
Sweet and Sour (1963)	Dragées au poivre	Jacques Baratier	France, Italy
Ugetsu (1953)	雨月物語	Kenji Mizoguchi	Japan
Valley of Peace (1956)	Dolina miru	France Štiglic	Yugoslavia
Valmont (1989)		Miloš Forman	France, United States
Voyage to the End of the Universe (1963)	Ikarie XB-1	Jindřich Polák	Czechoslovakia
The Double Palm d'Or of 1966
The Birds, the Bees and the Italians (1966)	Signore & signori	Pietro Germi	Italy, France
A Man and a Woman (1966)	Un homme et une femme	Claude Lelouch	France
Tribute to Raymond Depardon and Frederick Wiseman
Hospital (1970)		Frederick Wiseman	United States
News Items (1983)	Faits divers	Raymond Depardon	France
70th Anniversary of the FIPRESCI
Farrebique (1946)	Farrebique ou Les quatre saisons	Georges Rouquier	France
Documentaries about Cinema
Bernadette Lafont, and God Created the Free Woman (ŒdO)	Bernadette Lafont et Dieu créa la femme libre	Esther Hoffenberg	France
Bright Lights: Starring Carrie Fisher and Debbie Reynolds (ŒdO)		Alexis Bloom and Fisher Stevens	United States
Cinema Novo (ŒdO)		Eryk Rocha	Brazil
The Cinema Travellers (CdO) (ŒdO)		Shirley Abraham and Amit Madheshiya	India
Close Encounters with Vilmos Zsigmond (CdO) (ŒdO)		Pierre Filmon	France
The Family Whistle (CdO) (ŒdO)		Michele Russo	Italy, United States
Gentleman Rissient (ŒdO)		Benoît Jacquot, Pascal Mérigeau and Guy Seligmann	France
Journey Through French Cinema	Voyage à travers le cinéma français	Bertrand Tavernier	France
Midnight Return: The Story of Billy Hayes and Turkey (CdO) (ŒdO)		Sally Sussman	United States, United Kingdom, Portugal, Turkey
Women Who Run Hollywood (ŒdO)	Et la femme créa Hollywood	Clara Kuperberg and Julia Kuperberg	France
Special Screenings
Planet of the Vampires (1965)	Terrore nello spazio	Mario Bava	Italy, Spain, United States
Time to Die (1966)	Tiempo de morir	Arturo Ripstein	Mexico

(CdO) indicates film eligible for the Caméra d'Or as directorial debut feature.
(ŒdO) film eligible for the Œil d'or as documentary.

=== Cinéma de la Plage ===
The Cinéma de la Plage is a part of the Official Selection of the festival. The outdoors screenings at the beach cinema of Cannes are open to the public.

English Title	Original Title	Director(s)	Production Country
Coup de tête (1979)		Jean-Jacques Annaud	France
The Easy Life (1962)	Il sorpasso	Dino Risi	Italy
The Endless Summer (1966)		Bruce Brown	United States
The Great Dictator (1940)		Charlie Chaplin	United States
Purple Rain (1984)		Albert Magnoli	United States
King of Hearts (1966)	Le Roi de cœur	Philippe de Broca	France
Kiss Me Deadly (1955)		Robert Aldrich	United States
Sorcerer (1977)		William Friedkin	United States
We All Loved Each Other So Much (1974)	C'eravamo tanto amati	Ettore Scola	Italy

== Parallel Sections ==
=== Critics' Week ===
The full selection for the Critics' Week section was announced on 18 April 2016, at the section's website. In Bed with Victoria by Justine Triet was selected as the opening film, while the short films Bonne Figure by Sandrine Kiberlain, En Moi by Laetitia Casta, and Kitty by Chloë Sevigny were selected as the closing films.

English Title	Original Title	Director(s)	Production Country
In Competition
Album (CdO)	Albüm	Mehmet Can Mertoğlu	Turkey, France, Romania
Diamond Island		Davy Chou	Cambodia, France, Germany, Thailand
Mimosas		Oliver Laxe	Spain, France, Morocco, Qatar
One Week and a Day (CdO)	שבוע ויום	Asaph Polonsky	Israel
Raw (CdO) (QP)	Grave	Julia Ducournau	France, Belgium
Tramontane (CdO)	ربيع	Vatche Boulghourjian	Lebanon, France, Qatar, United Arab Emirates
A Yellow Bird (CdO)		K. Rajagopal	Singapore, France
Short Films Competition
Arnie	阿尼	Rina B. Tsou	Taiwan, Philippines
Ascension	Ascensão	Pedro Peralta	Portugal
Birth of a Leader	L'enfance d'un chef	Antoine de Bary	France
Campo de Viboras		Cristèle Alves Meira	Portugal
Delusion Is Redemption to Those in Distress	O Delírio é A Redenção Dos Aflitos	Filipe Fernandes	Brazil
Limbo		Konstantina Kotzamani	Greece
Oh What a Wonderful Feeling		François Jaros	Canada
Prenjak		Wregas Bhanuteja	Indonesia
Superbia		Luca Tóth	Hungary
The Virgin Soldier	Le Soldat vierge	Erwan Le Duc	France
Special Screenings
Apnea (CdO) (QP)	Apnée	Jean-Christophe Meurisse	France
En Moi (short) (closing film)		Laetitia Casta	France
From the Diary of a Wedding Photographer	מיומנו של צלם חתונות	Nadav Lapid	Israel
Happy Times Will Come Soon	I tempi felici verranno presto	Alessandro Comodin	Italy, France
In Bed with Victoria (opening film)	Victoria	Justine Triet	France
Kitty (short) (closing film)		Chloë Sevigny	United States
Los pasos del agua		César Augusto Acevedo	Colombia
Smile (short) (closing film)	Bonne figure	Sandrine Kiberlain	France

(CdO) indicates film eligible for the Caméra d'Or as directorial debut feature.
(QP) film eligible for the Queer Palm.

=== Directors' Fortnight ===
The full selection for the Directors' Fortnight section was announced on 19 April 2016, at the section's website. Sweet Dreams by Marco Bellocchio was selected as the opening film, while and Dog Eat Dog by Paul Schrader was selected as the closing film.

English Title	Original Title	Director(s)	Production Country
After Love	L'Economie du Couple	Joachim Lafosse	France, Belgium
Divines (CdO) (QP)		Houda Benyamina	France, Qatar
Dog Eat Dog (closing film)		Paul Schrader	United States
Endless Poetry	Poesía sin fin	Alejandro Jodorowsky	Chile, Japan, France
Fiore (QP)		Claudio Giovannesi	Italy, France
Like Crazy	La pazza gioia	Paolo Virzì	Italy, France
The Lives of Thérèse (ŒdO) (QP)	Les Vies de Thérèse	Sébastien Lifshitz	France
Mean Dreams		Nathan Morlando	Canada
Mercenary (CdO)	Mercenaire	Sacha Wolff	France
My Life as a Zucchini (CdO)	Ma vie de courgette	Claude Barras	Switzerland, France
Neruda		Pablo Larraín	Chile, Argentina, France, Spain
Psycho Raman		Anurag Kashyap	India
Risk (ŒdO)		Laura Poitras	United States, Germany
Sweet Dreams (opening film)	Fai bei sogni	Marco Bellocchio	Italy, France
The Together Project	L'Effet aquatique	Sólveig Anspach	France, Iceland
Tour de France		Rachid Djaïdani	France
Two Lovers and a Bear		Kim Nguyen	Canada
Wolf and Sheep (CdO)	گرگ و گوسفند	Shahrbanoo Sadat	Denmark, Afghanistan
Short Films
Abigail		Isabel Penoni and Valentina Homem	Brazil
The Beast	Zvir	Miroslav Sikavica	Croatia
Chasse Royale		Romane Gueret, Lise Akoka	France
Decorado		Alberto Vázquez	Spain
Habat Shel Hakala		Tamar Rudoy	Israel
Happy End		Jan Saska	Czech Republic
Hitchhiker		Jero Yun	South Korea
Import		Ena Sendijarević	Netherlands
Kindil El Bahr	قنديل البحر	Damien Ounouri	Algeria
Léthé		Déa Kulumbegashvili	France, Georgia
Listening to Beethoven		Garri Bardine	Russia

(CdO) film eligible for the Caméra d'Or as directorial debut feature.
(ŒdO) film eligible for the Œil d'or as documentary.
(QP) film eligible for the Queer Palm.

=== ACID ===
The Association for Independent Cinema and its Distribution (ACID), an association of French and foreign film directors, demonstrates its support for nine films each year, seeking to provide support from filmmakers to other filmmakers. The full ACID selection was announced on 19 April 2016, at the section's website.

English Title	Original Title	Director(s)	Production Country
The Girl Without Hands	La Jeune Fille sans mains	Sébastien Laudenbach	France
Isola		Fabianny Deschamps	France
Madame B, histoire d'une nord-coréenne		Jero Yun	France, South Korea
Le Parc		Damien Manivel	France
Sac la mort		Emmanuel Parraud	France
Swagger		Olivier Babinet	France
Tombé du ciel		Wissam Charaf	France, Lebanon
Journey to Greenland	Le Voyage au Groenland	Sébastien Betbeder	France
Willy 1er (QP)		Ludovic Boukherma, Zoran Boukherma, Marielle Gautier, Hugo P. Thomas	France

(QP) indicates film eligible for the Queer Palm.

== Official Awards ==
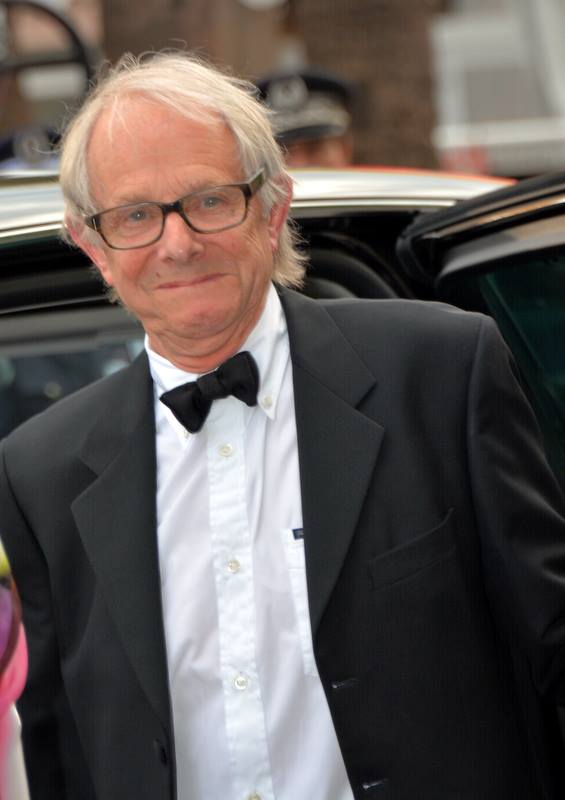
Ken Loach, winner of the 2016 Palme d'Or

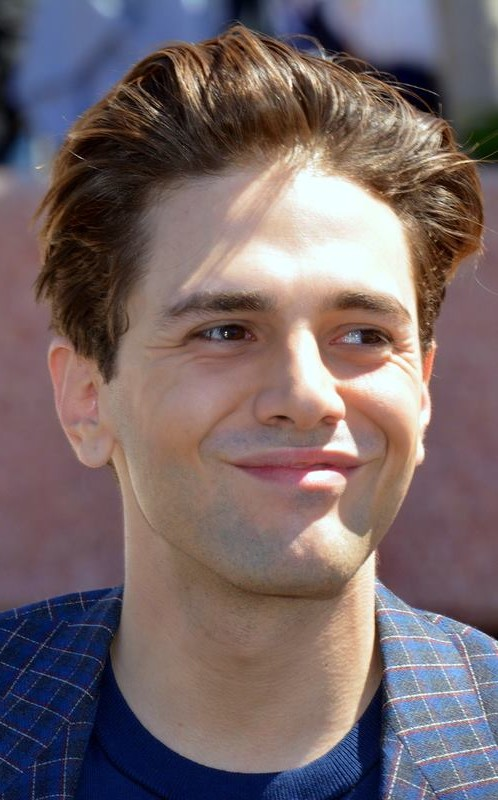
Xavier Dolan, winner of the Grand Prix

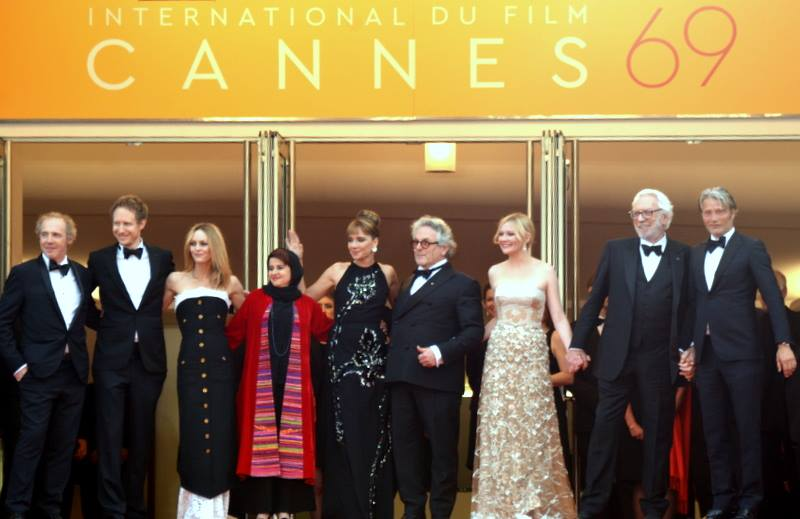
The main competition jury.

=== In Competition ===
- Palme d'Or: I, Daniel Blake by Ken Loach
- Grand Prix: It's Only the End of the World by Xavier Dolan
- Jury Prize: American Honey by Andrea Arnold
- Best Director:
  - Cristian Mungiu for Graduation
  - Olivier Assayas for Personal Shopper
- Best Screenplay: Asghar Farhadi for The Salesman
- Best Actress: Jaclyn Jose for Ma' Rosa
- Best Actor: Shahab Hosseini for The Salesman

=== Honorary Palme d'Or ===
- Jean-Pierre Léaud

=== Un Certain Regard ===
- Un Certain Regard Award: The Happiest Day in the Life of Olli Mäki by Juho Kuosmanen
- Un Certain Regard Jury Prize: Harmonium by Kōji Fukada
- Un Certain Regard Award for Best Director: Matt Ross for Captain Fantastic
- Un Certain Regard Award for Best Screenplay: Delphine Coulin and Muriel Coulin for The Stopover
- Un Certain Regard Special Prize: The Red Turtle by Michael Dudok de Wit

=== Cinéfondation ===
- First Prize: Anna by Or Sinai
- Second Prize: In the Hills by Hamid Ahmadi
- Third Prize: The Noise of Licking by Nadja Andrasev & The Guilt, Probably by Michael Labarca

=== Caméra d'Or ===
- Divines by Houda Benyamina

=== Short Films Competition ===
- Short Film Palme d'Or: Timecode by Juanjo Giménez
  - Special Mention: The Girl Who Danced with the Devil by João Paulo Miranda Maria

== Independent Awards ==
=== FIPRESCI Prizes ===
- Toni Erdmann by Maren Ade (In Competition)
- Dogs by Bogdan Mirică (Un Certain Regard)
- Raw by Julia Ducournau (Critics' Week)

=== Vulcan Award of the Technical Artist ===
- Ryu Seong-hui (art direction) for The Handmaiden

=== Prize of the Ecumenical Jury ===
- It's Only the End of the World by Xavier Dolan
- Commendations:
  - I, Daniel Blake by Ken Loach
  - American Honey by Andrea Arnold

=== Critics' Week ===
- Nespresso Grand Prize: Mimosas by Oliver Laxe
- France 4 Visionary Award: Album by Mehmet Can Mertoğlu
- SACD Award: Diamond Island by Davy Chou
- Leica Cine Discovery Prize for Short Film: Prenjak by Wregas Bhanuteja
- Canal+ Award: Birth of a Leader by Antoine de Bary
- Gan Foundation Support for Distribution Award: One Week and a Day by Asaph Polonsky

=== Directors' Fortnight ===
- Art Cinema Award: Wolf and Sheep by Shahrbanoo Sadat
- SACD Award: The Together Project by Sólveig Anspach
  - SACD special mention: Divines by Houda Benyamina
- Europa Cinemas Label Award: Mercenary by Sacha Wolff
- Illy Prize for Short Film: Chasse Royal by Lise Akoka and Romane Gueret
  - Illy special mention: The Beast by Miroslav Sikavica

=== L'Œil d'or ===
- Cinema Novo by Eryk Rocha
  - Special Mention: The Cinema Travelers by Shirley Abraham and Amit Madheshiya

=== Queer Palm ===
- The Lives of Thérèse by Sébastien Lifshitz
- Short Film Queer Palm: Gabber Lover by Anna Cazenave Cambet

=== Palm Dog ===
- Palm Dog Award: Nellie for Paterson
- Grand Jury Prize: Jacques for In Bed with Victoria
- Palm Dog Manitarian Award: Ken Loach for showcasing a three-legged dog named Shea in I, Daniel Blake

=== Prix François Chalais ===
- The Student by Kirill Serebrennikov

=== Cannes Soundtrack Award ===
- Cliff Martinez for The Neon Demon
