= Sébastien Betbeder =

French film director

- Born: 4 January 1975 (age 51); Pau, Pyrénées-Atlantiques, France
- Occupation: Film director
- Years active: 2003-present

Sébastien Betbeder (born 4 January 1975) is a French film director. He has directed more than ten films since 2003.

== Biography ==
After studying at the École des beaux-arts de Bordeaux, he joined Le Fresnoy.

He directed several short films before making his first fantasy-inspired feature film, Nuage, which was released in theaters in 2007. This was followed by Les Nuits avec Théodore (selected at Toronto, and winner of the FIPRESCI Prize at the San Francisco International Film Festival) and Deux Automnes Trois Hivers (featured in the ACID programming at the 2013 Cannes Film Festival, and winner of the Special Jury Prize at the Torino Film Festival), a "dramedy" that follows the lives of thirty-somethings dealing with modern preoccupations.

In 2014, he began a Greenlandic trilogy with Inupiluk (winner of the Prix Jean Vigo for short film and the Audience Award at the Clermont-Ferrand International Short Film Festival). This was followed by another short film, Le Film que nous tournerons au Groenland, and then the feature film Le Voyage au Groenland (selected for the ACID parallel section at the 2016 Cannes Film Festival). For this shoot, he brought actors Thomas Blanchard, Thomas Scimeca, and François Chattot to the remote village of Kullorsuaq. The film was supported by the explorer Nicolas Dubreuil. This cinematic adventure also spawned a transmedia project, notably including the web-series Thomas et Thomas s’en vont au Groenland, a production logbook, and various documentary features.

In 2015, he wrote the radio drama Kepler-452b for France Culture.

In 2016, his fourth feature film, Marie et les Naufragés, was released in French theaters. The comedy starred Pierre Rochefort, Vimala Pons, and Éric Cantona, with a film score composed by Sébastien Tellier.

For Arte, he was given carte blanche to create segments for the program Blow up as well as Arman hors saison, a short version of Deux Automnes Trois Hivers. In 2017, he contributed to the collaborative book La Nouvelle comédie du cinéma français and to the 8th issue of the cinema interview journal Répliques.

He directed several music videos for tracks from Albin de la Simone's album L'Un de nous, including "Le Grand Amour", "Une femme" featuring Micha Lescot, and "Dans ma tête" featuring Emmanuelle Devos and Régis Laspalès.

In 2018, he directed his sixth feature film, Ulysse et Mona, starring Éric Cantona and Manal Issa in the title roles.

== Selected filmography ==
Year	Title	Role	Notes
2014	2 Autumns, 3 Winters		
2016	Journey To Greenland		
2018	Ulysses & Mona		
2025	The Incredible Snow Woman	Director	It will be screened in Panorama at the 75th Berlin International Film Festival in February 2025.
