= Lino Arruda =

Brazilian artist, illustrator

- Born: 1986; Campinas
- Occupations: Artist, illustrator, researcher
- Awards: MixBrasil Awards (2021)
- Website: linoarruda.art

Lino Arruda is a Brazilian artist, illustrator, graphic novelist, and researcher. He is known for the autobiographical comic book Monstrans: Experimenting with Horrormones, which was awarded by Itaú Cultural's Itaú Rumos fund. The work received the MixBrasil award, in 2021, in the category of best LGBTQIA+ book of the year and is a finalist for the Golden Crown Literary Society's 2022 Goldie awards, in the non-fiction category.

Arruda is a transmasculine artist and often writes and researches on LGBTQIA+ topics. He earned a master's degree in Visual Arts and a doctorate in Literature and both processes inspired his artistic productions. In addition to Monstrans, the artist has also published the zines Anomalina (2014), Novo Corte de Peitos (2018), Quimer(d)a (2015) and Sapatoons (2011). He currently writes the transfuturist comic CISFORIA: The worst of both worlds with the support of the ProAC fund.

== See also ==
- LGBT themes in comics
- Brazilian comics
- List of fictional trans characters
- List of transgender publications
