= No Rest for the Brave =

- Directed by: Alain Guiraudie
- Starring: Thomas Suire; Laurent Soffiati
- Release date: 20 May 2003 (CFF)
- Running time: 1h 44min
- Countries: France; Austria
- Language: French

No Rest for the Brave (French: Pas de repos pour les braves) is a 2003 French / Austrian comedy film directed by Alain Guiraudie. The film was screened at the Directors' Fortnight event of the 2003 Cannes Film Festival.

== Cast ==
- Thomas Suire - Basile Matin / Hector
- Laurent Soffiati - Johnny Got
- Thomas Blanchard - Igor
- Jeanine Canezin - La mère de Basile
- Evelyne Bruniquel-Lebert - La voisine / La cliente / Le couple de pompiste

== Production ==
Filming took place in Carmaux (Tarn).
