= The Cinema Travellers =

- Directed by: Amit Madheshiya; Shirley Abraham
- Written by: Amit Madheshiya; Shirley Abraham
- Produced by: Amit Madheshiya; Shirley Abraham
- Cinematography: Amit Madheshiya
- Edited by: Amit Madheshiya; Shirley Abraham
- Music by: Laura Karpman
- Production company: Cave Pictures
- Release date: 15 May 2016 (Cannes)
- Running time: 96 minutes
- Country: India
- Languages: Hindi, Marathi

The Cinema Travellers is a 2016 documentary film about the travelling cinemas of India, directed by Shirley Abraham and Amit Madheshiya. The film is produced by Cave Pictures, India, a company co-founded by Shirley Abraham and Amit Madheshiya in 2015. It was pitched at the 2013 Sheffield Doc/Fest MeetMarket. The film premiered as an Official Selection at the 2016 Cannes Film Festival and won L'Œil d'or Special Mention: Le Prix du documentaire. In 2016, it was the only Indian film playing as an Official Selection at Cannes.

== Story ==
Showmen riding cinema lorries have brought the wonder of the movies to faraway villages in India once every year. Seven decades on, as their cinema projectors crumble and film reels become scarce, their patrons are lured by slick digital technology. A benevolent showman, a shrewd exhibitor and a maverick projector mechanic bear a beautiful burden - to keep the last travelling cinemas of the world running.

== Film festivals ==
The Cinema Travellers had its world premiere on 15 May 2016 at the Salle Buñuel in the Palais des Festival at 2016 Cannes Film Festival. Following that, the film has been invited to play at 2016 Toronto International Film Festival, and 2016 New York Film Festival, becoming the only Indian documentary film to achieve this rare trifecta of topmost film festivals.

Cannes Film Festival	May 2016	Official Selection
Sydney Film Festival	June 2016	Official Selection
Toronto International Film Festival	Sep 2016	Official Selection
Batumi International Art House Film Festival	Sep 2016	Winner
Vilnius Documentary Film Festival	Sep 2016	Opening Film
New York Film Festival	Oct 2016	Official Selection
New Hampshire Film Festival	Oct 2016	Documentary Grand Jury Prize
Busan International Film Festival	Oct 2016	Official Selection
Mumbai Film Festival	Oct 2016	Young Critics Choice Award Winner; Special Mention
Guelph Film Festival	Nov 2016	Opening Film
Canberra International Film Festival	Nov 2016	Closing Film
Hawaii International Film Festival	Nov 2016	Golden Orchid for Best Documentary Feature Winner
Denver Film Festival	Nov 2016	Official Selection
International Documentary Festival of Amsterdam	Nov 2016	Official Selection
Anchorage International Film Festival	Dec 2016	Best Documentary Winner
Dubai International Film Festival	Dec 2016	Official Selection
Kochi Biennale, Artist's Cinema	Dec 2016	Opening Film
Göteborg Film Festival	Jan 2017	Official Selection
Docedge	Feb 2017	Opening Film; Best International Director Special Mention
CPH:DOX	Mar 2017	Artists and Auteurs
Chiayi International Art Doc Film Festival	Mar 2017	Past at Present
Ljubljana Doc Film Festival	Mar 2017	Closing Film
San Francisco International Film Festival	Apr 2017	Official Selection
DOC10	Apr 2017	Official Selection
Royal Anthropological Institute Film Festival	Apr 2017	Audience Prize Winner
Festival International de Films de Fribourg	Apr 2017	Official Selection

== Reception ==
The Cinema Travellers premiered at Cannes Film Festival to a rousing response. The first audiences of the film gave it a standing ovation. Glowing press reviews followed. Graham Fuller of Screen Daily declared, "Whatever masterpieces, if any, bow at this year’s Cannes Film Festival, it is likely none will communicate the excitement engendered by movies more headily than The Cinema Travellers." He lauded the film for being "rigorous, aesthetically and intellectually." E. Nina Rothe of The Huffington Post called it a "masterpiece," and further, "a film from the heart and a testament to everything humanity should believe in wholeheartedly." Nick Schager of Variety found the film an "intimate, poignant documentary." Schager wrote, "Recalling Giuseppe Tornatore’s 1988 Oscar winner "Cinema Paradiso" in its effusive love of 20th-century celluloid splendor, this five-years-in-the-making film should entice theatrical-loving cinephiles." The film's narrative form drew attention from reviewers. Benjamin Lee of The Guardian gave it four stars and wrote "There’s not a moment that feels forced or tweaked to ensure an emotional beat gets checked off, which results in both immersion and authenticity at every stage of the film." He summed up the film as "evocative, subtle and heartfelt". David Ehrlich of Indiewire called the film, "wise and wistful." Alex Ritman of The Hollywood Reporter wrote, "Its triumph lies in how it also captures the magic of this unique, collective movie-watching experience." Rating the film 9.5 on 10, Alex Billington of First Showing found the film, "jaw dropping," and wrote, "Everyone else who loves the cinematic experience as much as I do needs to revel in the glory of this doc."Tom Brook of BBC Talking Movies interviewed the directors in Cannes and included the film in his special coverage from the festival. LA Times included the film in its wrap-up report from Cannes calling it one of "The most involving films on film history."

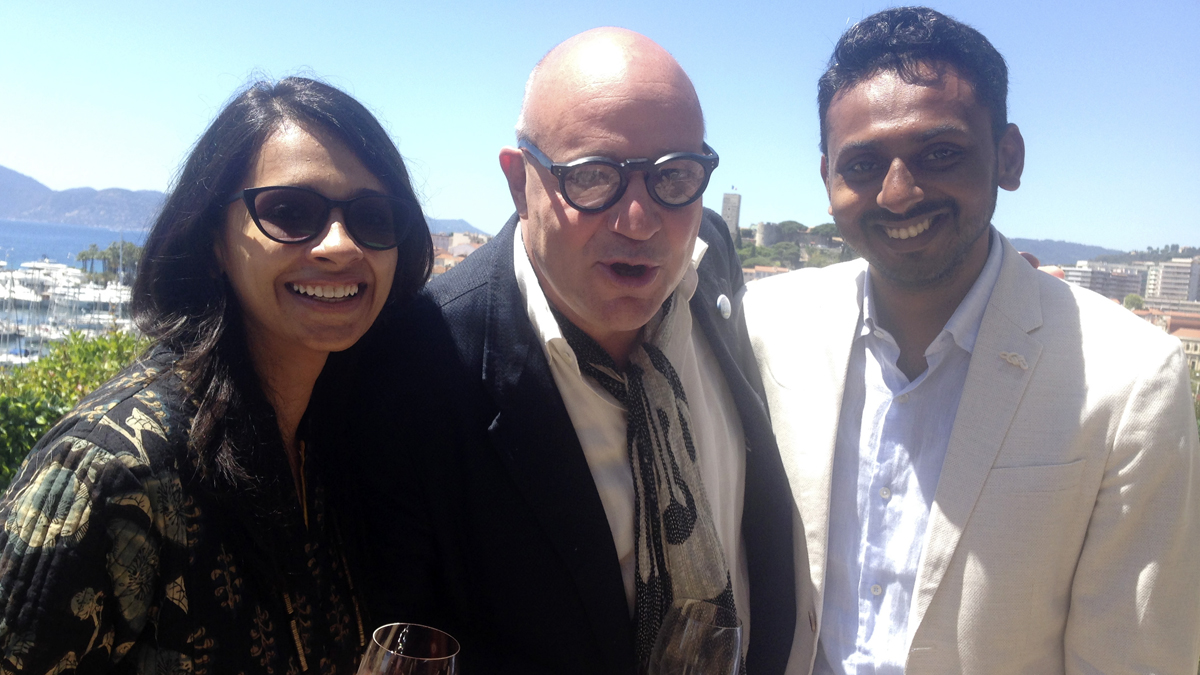
Shirley Abraham and Amit Madheshiya with Gianfranco Rosi, president of the L’Oeil d’or jury – Cannes Documentary Award

== Awards ==
Cannes Film Festival	L'Œil d'or: Le Prix du documentaire Special Mention	May 2016
Batumi International Art House Film Festival	Best Documentary Award	Sep 2016
New Hampshire Film Festival	Grand Jury Award	Oct 2016
Mumbai Film Festival	Young Critics' Choice Award	Oct 2016
Mumbai Film Festival	India Gold Special Mention	Oct 2016
Hawaii International Film Festival	Golden Orchid Award for Best Documentary	Nov 2016
Anchorage International Film Festival	Doc Jury Award	Dec 2016
Royal Anthropological Institute Film Festival	Audience Prize	April 2017
Documentary Edge Festival	Special Mention: Best International Director	May 2017
National Film Awards India	Special Jury Award: Best Non Fiction Film	May 2017
Indian Film Festival Stuttgart	Best Documentary	July 2017
Festival Du Film D'asie Du Sud	Student Jury Prize	Oct 2017
Santa Cruz Film Festival	Festival Director's Award	Oct 2017
Weyauwega International Film Festival	Best Documentary Feature	Nov 2017
