= Audrey Bastien =

French actress

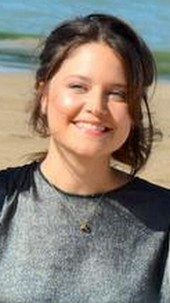
- Born: 10 December 1991 (age 34); France
- Occupation: Actress
- Years active: 2010–present

Audrey Bastien (born 10 December 1991) is a French actress. She appeared in more than twenty films since 2010.

== Selected filmography ==
Year	Title	Role	Notes
2010	Lights Out	Clara	
2011	18 Years Old and Rising	Delphine	
2013	Puppylove	Julia	
2014	2 Autumns, 3 Winters	Katia	
2015	The Great Game		
2017	Waiting For You	Sylvie	English/French language film
