= 2 Autumns, 3 Winters =

2013 film by Sébastien Betbeder

- Theatrical release poster
- French: 2 automnes 3 hivers
- Directed by: Sébastien Betbeder
- Written by: Sébastien Betbeder
- Produced by: Frédéric Dubreuil
- Starring: Vincent Macaigne; Maud Wyler; Bastien Bouillon; Audrey Bastien; Pauline Étienne; Thomas Blanchard; Olivier Chantreau; Eriko Takeda; Jean-Quentin Châtelain
- Cinematography: Sylvain Verdet
- Edited by: Julie Dupré
- Music by: Bertrand Betsch
- Production company: Envie de Tempête Productions
- Distributed by: UFO Distribution
- Release dates: 18 May 2013 (Cannes); 25 December 2013 (France)
- Running time: 91 minutes
- Country: France
- Language: French
- Budget: €361,757
- Box office: $30,985

2 Autumns, 3 Winters (French: 2 automnes 3 hivers) is a 2013 French romantic comedy film written and directed by Sébastien Betbeder. It stars Vincent Macaigne, Maud Wyler, Bastien Bouillon and Audrey Bastien, with Pauline Étienne, Thomas Blanchard, Olivier Chantreau, Eriko Takeda and Jean-Quentin Châtelain.

== Plot ==
The story is narrated by each of the major characters. At the beginning, 33-year-old Arman decides to change his life. For starters, he takes up jogging, which is how he has his first meeting with Amélie.

== Cast ==
- Vincent Macaigne as Arman
- Maud Wyler as Amélie
- Bastien Bouillon as Benjamin
- Audrey Bastien as Katia
- Thomas Blanchard as Jan
- Pauline Etienne as Lucie
- Jean-Quentin Châtelain as Arman's father
- Olivier Chantreau as Guillaume
- Eriko Takeda as Hazuki
- Loïc Hourcastagnon as the small ninja
- Emmanuel Demonsant as the big ninja
- Philippe Crespeau as Benjamin's father
- Marie-Claude Roulin as Benjamin's mother
- Zacharie Chasseriaud as the skater
- Jérôme Thibault as the doctor

== Release ==
2 Autumns, 3 Winters had its world premiere at the Cannes Film Festival on 18 May 2013. The film had its US premiere at the Hamptons International Film Festival on 10 October 2013. It was released theatrically in France on 25 December 2013 by UFO Distribution. The film had its New York City premiere as part of the Rendez-vous with French Cinema series on 8 March 2014. Film Movement opened the film for one week at the Elinor Bunin Monroe Film Center in New York City on 6 June 2014.

== Critical response ==
Jordan Mintzer of The Hollywood Reporter called it a "low-key kind of dramedy" and a "quirky French indie that gets by more on style and sass than on its storytelling skills, [...] With endearing performances and crafty 16mm imagery, but also a tad too many winks to the camera, this Cannes ACID sidebar selection should see additional fest and niche art-house play".

Ronnie Scheib of Variety commented that "[i]n Sebastien Betbeder's playfully arty 2 Autumns, 3 Winters, three protagonists offer self-conscious riffs on their every thought and action, directly addressing the camera to describe past happenings, present happenings or what's about to occur momentarily. Mundane actions, trite exchanges and life-altering events all undergo the same literary alchemy, creating a matter-of-fact, Woody Allen-ish sense of complicity with the viewer. Maintaining a bemused, sometimes comic distance, Betbeder traces how happenstance crystallizes into biography as his characters traverse the titular seasons, with results that will delight some and alienate others."

Mike Russell of The Oregonian gave it a 'B' grade saying "[a] fair amount of traumatic stuff happens in 2 Autumns, 3 Winters [... b]ut writer/director Sébastien Betbeder's French seriocomic romance still feels light (or emotionally distant, depending), thanks to the film's fusillade of stylistic tics."
