= Cities of Last Things =

- Film poster
- Chinese: 幸福城市
- Literal meaning: Joyful Cities
- Hanyu Pinyin: Xìngfú Chéngshì
- Directed by: Ho Wi Ding
- Written by: Ho Wi Ding
- Produced by: Ho Wi Ding; Hu Chi Hsin; Winnie Lau; Alexis Perrin; Ronan Wong
- Starring: Jack Kao; Lee Hong-chi; Hsieh Chang-Ying; Louise Grinberg
- Cinematography: Jean-Louis Vialard
- Edited by: Ho Wi Ding; Huey Lee
- Music by: Robin Coudert
- Production companies: Changhe Films; Ivanhoe Pictures; Rumble Fish Productions
- Release date: 8 September 2018 (TIFF)
- Running time: 107 minutes
- Countries: Taiwan; China; France; United States
- Languages: Mandarin; English; French

Cities of Last Things (Chinese: 幸福城市) is a drama film, directed by Ho Wi Ding and released in 2018.

== Plot ==
The film opens in 2056 with the suicide an unnamed person jumping out an apartment window and falling to his death. The story examines, in reverse chronological order three different timeframes of the life of Zhang Dong Ling leading up to his suicide.

The first segment starts with a middle aged Zhang who sees his wife dancing provocatively with another man. Zhang assaults the man and leaves the dance hall. He then visits a prostitute and sees her inject herself with a "rejuvenation fluid" which makes women look younger. He gets a gun from the prostitute and leaves. He then visits another prostitute Ara (Grinberg) who reminds him of a someone he knew long ago. Zhang scans her ID tag which all citizens are branded with but receives no information. Zhang has sex with the girl which causes him to recall images of Ara. Zhang, while disguised as a doctor, then visits an unconscious Minister of Health Shi Zhi-Wen in a heavily guarded hospital. After waking Zhi-wen he reminds him who he is and then shoots him. After visiting his daughter he visits his wife's lover who tells him his wife and him are in love and he should get a divorce. Zhang then assaults him by beating in the head with an object. Zhang then visits his wife and strangles her in the course of an argument over how she obtained rejuvenation fluids. The police are able to retrieve a recording from his wife's memory and determine Zhang is the murderer. The police send a drone to arrest Zhang at his apartment he shoots the drone and jumps out a window.

The second segment shows Zhang as a young man working as a police officer. He arrests Ara (Grinberg) for shoplifting. While on shift his partner gives him some time off to surprise his wife with a cake. He finds his Superior - a younger Shi Zhi-Wen having kinky sex with his wife. Zhang puts a gun to the Zhi-wen's head but is overpowered. Zhi-wen tells him to return to the station. Zhang is tormented by images of his wife cheating on him and tries to commit suicide but cannot go through with it. Zhang goes into the Zhi-wen's locker and throws the (dirty) money all over the locker room at the station. Zhang leaves and coincidentally sees Ara shoplifting. Instead of arresting her he pays for the items she took. Zhang is then kidnapped and beaten up by Zhi-wen. Zhang returns with Ara to her place and they end up having sex. They agree to run away together, but when Zhang returns to work he is arrested for bribes and they find copious amounts of money in his locker. When he demands to see the deputy chief he is told that he messed up for everyone and will have to spend 6 months in jail. Leading to him apparently never seeing Ara ever again. Zhi-wen tells him sarcastically he will take good care of his wife while he is in jail.

The third segment shows Zhang as a youth who is in possession of a stolen scooter. While running away from the police he literally runs into Big Sister Wang who coincidentally is running away from the police. The police want Wang to become an informant and she refuses. While Zhang is being processed for possessing stolen property he and Wang start talking with each other. Wang then recognizes Zhang and tells him she knows his Grandma long before he existed. Zhang tells Wang he misses his mother but hates her more for abandoning him. When the police get Wang sign her papers Zhang recognized her name as that of his mother's. When Wang asks him whether he can forgive his mother, he says no and asks to be moved elsewhere. While they are both at the front of the police station awaiting transport, the officer asks Zhang whether he will forgive his mother because she will be in jail for a long time. Zhang says she has mistaken him for someone else. Wang tells Zhang that there was lady who used to take him to the park and let him sit on the swing. When Wang is taken away. she shouts to Zhang to be a good person and not end up like her. While they are being driven away Wang is shot by a person pulling up in a motorcycle. The film ends with a sequence of a woman with her young child at a swing.

== Cast ==
- Zhang Dong:
  - First Segment - Jack Kao
  - Second Segment - Lee Hong-chi
  - Third Segment - Hsieh Chang-Ying
- Huang Lu
- Louise Grinberg
- Lee Hong-chi
- Ivy Yin
- Linda Jui-chi Liu
- Ding Ning
- Shih Chin-hang
- Shih Ming-shuai
- Duan Chun-hao
- Hsia Ching-ting
- Eric Tu
- Kenny Kuo
- Hsieh Chang-ying
- Joey Yu
- Igor Kovic

== Production ==
Cities of Last Things is a co-production of companies from Taiwan, China, France and the United States.

== Release ==
The film premiered in the Platform program at the 2018 Toronto International Film Festival, and was named the winner of the Platform Prize.

It was released on July 11, 2019 on Netflix streaming in certain regions.
