= Falcon Lake (film) =

2022 film

- Film poster
- Directed by: Charlotte Le Bon
- Screenplay by: François Choquet; Charlotte Le Bon; Bastien Vivès
- Based on: Une sœur by Bastien Vivès
- Produced by: Sylvain Corbeil; Nancy Grant
- Starring: Joseph Engel; Sara Montpetit; Karine Gonthier-Hyndman; Monia Chokri
- Cinematography: Kristof Brandl
- Edited by: Julie Lena
- Music by: Klô Pelgag; Shida Shahabi
- Production companies: Cinefrance; Ley Line Entertainment; Sons of Manual
- Distributed by: Sphere Films (Canada); Tandem (France)
- Release date: May 18, 2022 (Cannes)
- Running time: 100 minutes
- Countries: Canada; France
- Languages: French; English
- Box office: $138,879

Falcon Lake is a 2022 coming-of-age drama film, directed and co-written by Charlotte Le Bon. Adapted from the graphic novel Une sœur by Bastien Vivès, the film stars Joseph Engel as Bastien, a 13-year-old boy from Paris, France, on a family vacation in Quebec, where he meets and develops a relationship with Chloé (Sara Montpetit), the 16-year-old daughter of his mother's friend Louise (Karine Gonthier-Hyndman). The cast also includes Monia Chokri as Bastien's mother Violette, as well as Jeff Roop, Pierre-Luc Lafontaine, and Thomas Laperrière in supporting roles.

== Plot ==
Thirteen-year-old Bastien travels from Paris to Quebec with his family to spend the summer at a lakeside cottage belonging to his mother’s friend, Louise. There, he meets Louise’s sixteen-year-old daughter, Chloé, with whom he shares a bedroom alongside his younger brother, Titi. Initially reserved, Bastien gradually becomes close to Chloé, who introduces him to local ghost stories, including a legend about a child who drowned in the nearby lake. Bastien reveals that he nearly drowned when he was younger and remains afraid of swimming.

As the summer progresses, Bastien develops romantic feelings for Chloé and begins accompanying her when she spends time with older teenagers from the area. He attends parties with them, where he gradually becomes more comfortable in their company. Chloé also begins confiding in him about her insecurities and relationships. Although the two grow closer, their different ages and experiences create an uneven relationship, particularly as Chloé continues to show interest in older boys. She also dresses Bastien in a bedsheet and photographs him beside the lake as part of their game of pretending to be the ghost from her story.

Their relationship becomes strained after Bastien tells the other boys that he has slept with Chloé, upsetting her. At a bonfire party, the two attempt to make each other jealous. Bastien watches as Chloé becomes intimate with another boy near the lake. Hurt by what he sees, he enters the water despite his fear of drowning.

In the final sequence, Bastien’s family returns to the lake, where flowers have been left in his memory, suggesting that he has drowned. As they mourn him, Bastien appears to emerge from the surrounding woods and runs towards Chloé, who is sitting alone on a nearby pier. He calls her name, and she appears to hear him. The film ends without clarifying whether Bastien has survived or become the ghost associated with the lake.

== Cast ==
- Joseph Engel as Bastien
- Sara Montpetit as Chloé
- Monia Chokri as Violette
- Arthur Igual as Romain
- Karine Gonthier-Hyndman as Louise
- Anthony Therrien as Oliver
- Pierre-Luc Lafontaine as Stan

== Production and release ==
The film was shot in mid-2021 in and around Gore, Quebec during the COVID-19 pandemic.

The film debuted in the Director's Fortnight program at the 2022 Cannes Film Festival on May 18, 2022. It had its Canadian premiere at the 2022 Toronto International Film Festival.

== Critical response ==
On the review aggregation website Rotten Tomatoes, Falcon Lake holds an approval rating of 94% based on 48 reviews from critics, with an average rating of 7.5/10. The website's critics consensus reads, "Moody, sensitive, and subtly layered, Falcon Lake captures the intoxicating horror of young love." However, online magazine Slant commented that "the inadvertent effect of the brooding, almost overbearing gloom that shrouds Falcon Lake is that it manages to sap the life out of its initially carefree depiction of young people’s emotional lives".

Metacritic, which uses a weighted average, assigned the film a score of 71 out of 100, based on eight critics, indicating "generally favorable reviews".

== Awards ==
Award	Date of ceremony	Category	Recipient(s)	Result	Ref(s)
Deauville American Film Festival	2022	Prix d'Ornano-Valenti	Falcon Lake	Won	
Vancouver International Film Festival	2022	Emerging Canadian Director	Charlotte Le Bon	Won	
Prix Louis-Delluc	2022	Best First Film	Falcon Lake	Won	
Prix collégial du cinéma québécois	2023	Best Film	Falcon Lake	Nominated	
César Awards	February 24, 2023	Best First Feature Film	Charlotte Le Bon	Nominated	
Canadian Screen Awards	April 16, 2023	Best Motion Picture	Sylvain Corbeil, Nancy Grant	Nominated	
Canadian Screen Awards	April 16, 2023	Best Director	Charlotte Le Bon	Nominated	
Canadian Screen Awards	April 16, 2023	Best Lead Performance in a Film	Joseph Engel	Nominated	
Canadian Screen Awards	April 16, 2023	Best Supporting Performance in a Film	Sara Montpetit	Nominated	
Canadian Screen Awards	April 16, 2023	Best Adapted Screenplay	Charlotte Le Bon	Nominated	
Canadian Screen Awards	April 16, 2023	John Dunning Best First Feature Award	Charlotte Le Bon	Won	
Prix Iris	December 10, 2023	Best Film	Nancy Grant, Sylvain Corbeil, Dany Boon, Jalil Lespert, Julien Deris, David Gauquié, Jean-Luc Ormières	Nominated	
Prix Iris	December 10, 2023	Best Actress	Sara Montpetit	Nominated	
Prix Iris	December 10, 2023	Best Cinematography	Kristof Brandl	Nominated	
Prix Iris	December 10, 2023	Best Sound	Stephen De Oliveira, Séverin Favriau, Stéphane Thiébaut	Nominated	
Prix Iris	December 10, 2023	Most Successful Film Outside Quebec	Nancy Grant, Sylvain Corbeil, Dany Boon, Jalil Lespert, Julien Deris, David Gauquié, Jean-Luc Ormières, Charlotte Le Bon, Ariane Giroux-Dallaire	Won	
Prix Iris	December 10, 2023	Best First Film	Charlotte Le Bon	Won	
