= Tour de France (film) =

2016 film

- Film poster
- Directed by: Rachid Djaïdani
- Written by: Rachid Djaïdani
- Produced by: Anne-Dominique Toussaint
- Starring: Gérard Depardieu; Sadek
- Cinematography: Luc Pagès
- Edited by: Nelly Quettier
- Music by: Clément “Animalsons” Dumoulin
- Production companies: Les Films des Tournelles; Mars Films; Cité Films; AOC Films; Useful production
- Distributed by: Mars Films
- Release dates: 15 May 2016 (Cannes); 16 November 2016 (France)
- Running time: 95 minutes
- Country: France
- Language: French
- Box office: $425,000

Tour de France (in some markets titled French Tour) is a 2016 French drama film directed by Rachid Djaïdani. It was screened in the Directors' Fortnight section at the 2016 Cannes Film Festival.

== Cast ==
- Gérard Depardieu as Serge Desmoulins
- Sadek as Far'Hook
- Louise Grinberg as Maude
