= Peshmerga (film) =

- Theatrical poster
- Directed by: Bernard-Henri Lévy
- Release date: 20 May 2016 (Cannes)
- Running time: 92 minutes
- Country: France
- Languages: Kurdish, French

Peshmerga is a documentary film by the French intellectual Bernard-Henri Lévy. It was granted a late entry to the 2016 Cannes Film Festival as a special screening. It consists of a "close-up look" at the Peshmerga, the fighting force of the Kurds, battling to establish the state of Kurdistan across the existing states of Syria, Iraq, Iran, and Turkey.

Peshmerga was chosen as an official selection at the New York Jewish Film Festival in January 2017. It was later screened at the United Nations in November 2017 and at the US Congress in March 2018.

== See also ==
- Kurdish Cinema
- Gulîstan, Land of Roses, a 2016 documentary film about women PKK fighters
