= Solène Rigot =

French actress and musician (born 1992)

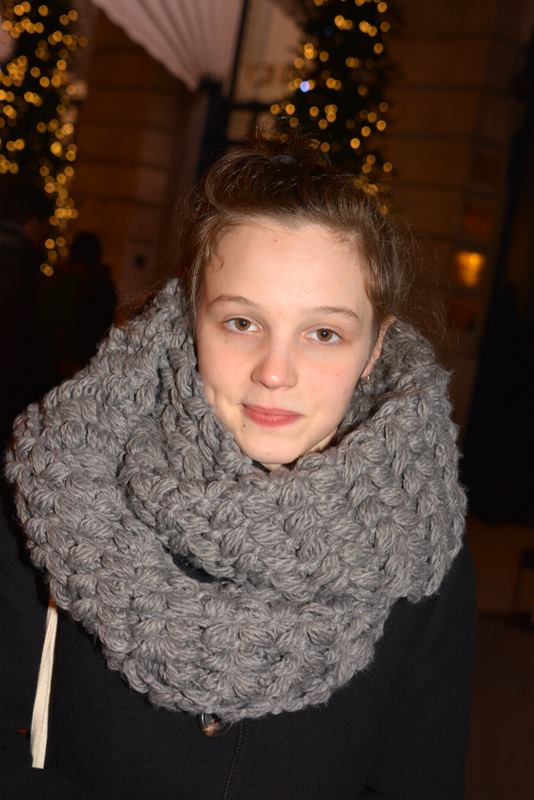
- Solene Rigot 2015
- Born: 1992 (age 33–34); Paris, France
- Occupations: Actor, musician
- Known for: Puppylove, 17 Girls

Solène Rigot (born 1992) is a French actress and musician. She is mostly known for playing the lead role in the Belgian movie Puppylove.

== Career ==
Her first big role was in 17 Girls. Her performance was praised in the French movie Les Révoltés. She starred in the music video "Up All Night" by Beck. She is also a member of the French musical group known as Mr. Crock.

She appears in the 2024 film Shepherds (Berger).

== Early life ==
The French newspaper L'Express reported that she grew up in the Paris suburb of Rosny-sous-Bois. In her interview to French magazine Les Inrockuptibles, she said that she took music lessons from childhood and then she auditioned for her first film La Permission de minuit.
