= Lara Stone =

Dutch fashion model (born 1983)

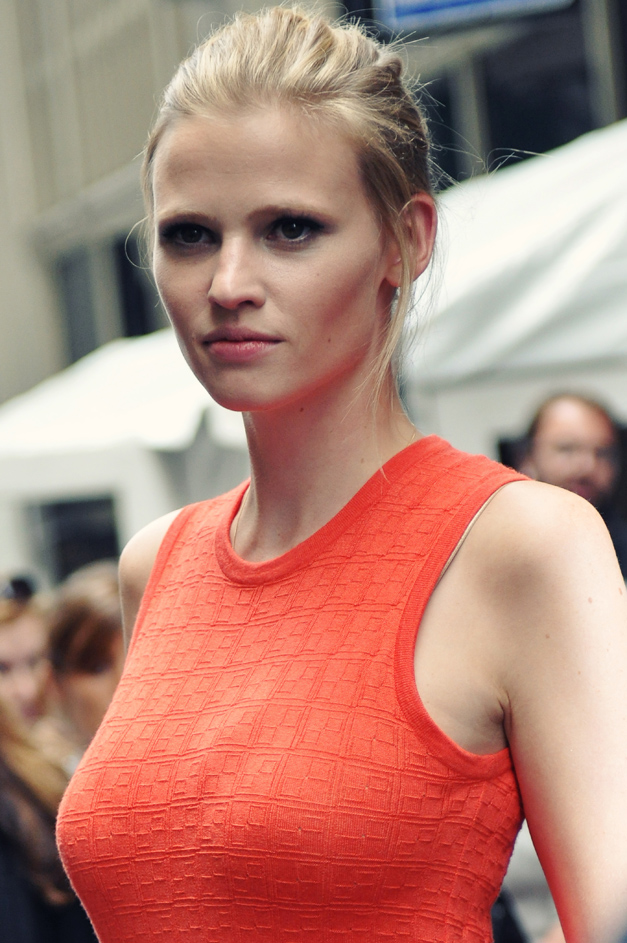
- Stone at Fashion Week NYC 2011
- Born: Lara Catherina Stone; 20 December 1983 (age 42); Geldrop, Netherlands
- Occupation: Model
- Years active: 1999–present
- Spouses: David Walliams (m. 2010; div. 2015); David Grievson (m. 2021)
- Children: 2
- Modelling information
- Height: 1.77 m (5 ft 9 1/2 in)
- Hair colour: Blonde
- Eye colour: Hazel
- Agency: The Lions (New York); Elite Model Management (Paris); Perspective Management perspectivemanagement.co.uk/lara-stone

Lara Catherina Stone (born 20 December 1983) is a Dutch model. She was discovered at the age of 12 in the Paris Metro and later participated in the Elite Model Look competition at 15. Stone has appeared on the covers of W and Vogue, has worked with various brands, including Fendi, Chanel, Prada, Louis Vuitton, and Versace, and was the face of Calvin Klein. She has been represented by The Lions, IMG Models, and Elite Model Management.

== Early life ==
Lara Catherina Stone was born on 20 December 1983 in Geldrop and grew up in Mierlo, a small town in the Netherlands. Her mother, Kathryna, is Dutch, and her father, Michael Stone, is English. She was discovered in the Paris Metro while on holiday with her family when she was 12. She took part in the Elite Model Look competition in 1999 when she was 15, and although she did not win, she caught the attention of Elite executives, who signed her to their modeling agency.

== Modeling career ==
=== Breakthrough: 2006–2008 ===
After leaving Elite, Stone signed with IMG Models worldwide in 2006. In January, she made her catwalk debut in Riccardo Tisci's Givenchy couture shows, during Paris Fashion Week. Later that year, she signed an exclusive contract with Calvin Klein. In March 2007, Stone appeared in a Vogue Paris editorial and was featured on the magazine's April cover. The New York Times fashion critic Cathy Horyn called Stone the "anti-model". She was also ranked No. 2 on New York Magazine's "Top Ten Models to Watch" for New York Fashion Week. Stone has walked in shows for designers including Giles Deacon, Isabel Marant, Christopher Kane, Fendi, and MaxMara, and closed for Chanel, Diesel, Marc Jacobs, Stella McCartney, and Balmain. She signed a "semi-exclusive" agreement with Prada in 2008.

Her spring/summer 2008 campaigns included Givenchy, Belstaff, Just Cavalli, and H&M. Her campaigns for autumn/winter 2008 included Calvin Klein, Givenchy, Belstaff, Hugo Boss, Calvin Klein Cosmetics, and Jil Sander. Stone was one of the models chosen to be on one of the fourteen covers of V magazine's September 2008 issue.

=== 2009–present ===
In the February 2009 edition of Vogue Paris, which featured Stone on the cover, she said she does not like the runway and that her unusually small feet for a person of her size do not fit in shoes. Stone was featured on the August 2009 cover of W, declaring her "Fashion's It Girl" and the reasons she is the most-wanted face and body in the business. Vogue Paris named her one of the top 30 models of the 2000s. Stone made her American Vogue debut on the May 2009 cover alongside Liya Kebede, Anna Jagodzinska, Natalia Vodianova, Caroline Trentini, Jourdan Dunn, Raquel Zimmermann, Sasha Pivovarova, Natasha Poly, Karen Elson, and Isabeli Fontana as one of the "Faces of the Moment." It was also a special issue because the cover featured models instead of celebrities. An international racial controversy arose when she appeared in an editorial for French's Vogue October 2009 issue with her face and body blackened.

In 2010, Stone replaced Sasha Pivovarova as the new face for Prada's fragrance Infusion d'Iris, shot by Steven Meisel. Her other spring/summer campaigns included Louis Vuitton, Versus by Versace Fragrance, Jaeger, and H&M. This same year her look sparked a trend in: blonde, gap-toothed, big-lipped models like Georgia May Jagger, Lindsey Wixson, and Ashley Smith. The look even inspired Tyra Banks to have a contestant's tooth gap widened on cycle 15 of America's Next Top Model.

Stone signed an exclusive deal with Calvin Klein Inc., making the 26-year-old model the face of the Calvin Klein Collection, CK Calvin Klein, and Calvin Klein Jeans for fall 2010. It marked the first time in years the fashion house had chosen to use one model for three of its brands, and Stone would be exclusive to CKI for all apparel advertising and runway appearances for fall. At the end of the year, she won the British Fashion Awards Model of the year 2010.

Stone was featured in the 2010 Pirelli Calendar photographed by Terry Richardson, as well as the 2011 version shot by Karl Lagerfeld. Stone was part of Vogue UK's first multi-cover in the publication's 95 years, landing one of the three May 2011 covers in celebration of the Wedding of Prince William of Wales and Kate Middleton. She debuted on Forbes' World's Top-Earning Models list, ranking No. 7, with estimated earnings of $4.5 million since May of last year (2010–2011).

In 2012 Stone featured again in the Pirelli Calendar, photographed by Mario Sorrenti. She was also the face of Calvin Klein's 2012 Underwear campaign.

Stone was ranked #1 on models.com's "Top 50 Models" list from Spring 2010 to Summer 2012 before moving to their "Industry Icons" list and she was also ranked the 9th sexiest model on their Top Sexiest Models list.

In March 2014, Stone again appeared on the cover of Vogue Paris and, in April, American Harper's Bazaar.

In March 2015, Stone appeared on one of three Vogue Paris covers alongside Kate Moss and Daria Werbowy. Stone was also on the August cover of British Vogue, shot by Mario Testino.

== Acting career ==
In 2016, Stone made a cameo appearance in Mandie Fletcher's Absolutely Fabulous: The Movie. In the same year, Stone starred with Yvan Attal, Mathilde Bisson, Arthur Igual and Akaji Maro in the short film En Moi ("In Me") directed by Laetitia Casta. The film was selected for the closing ceremony of the Critics' Week section at the 2016 Cannes Film Festival.

== Personal life ==
In the December 2009 issue of Vogue UK, Stone said she was undergoing inpatient rehabilitation for alcoholism earlier in the year.

Stone began dating English comedian David Walliams in September 2009. They became engaged in January 2010 and married at London's Claridge's Hotel on 16 May 2010. Their son was born in May 2013. It was reported on 4 March 2015 that the couple had begun a trial separation after "drifting apart". On 9 September 2015, Walliams filed for divorce, citing "unreasonable behaviour ". The couple were granted a decree nisi the following day, and the marriage was dissolved six weeks later. On 17 July 2021, Stone married property developer David Grievson. Their son was born in July 2023.

== Filmography ==
Year	Title	Role	Director	Notes
2016	En Moi; In Me	The actress	Laetitia Casta	Cannes Critics' Week
2016	Absolutely Fabulous: The Movie	Herself	Mandie Fletcher	cameo appearance
