= Journey to Greenland =

- Film poster
- Directed by: Sébastien Betbeder
- Starring: Thomas Blanchard; Thomas Scimeca
- Release date: 15 May 2016 (CFF)
- Running time: 1h 38min
- Country: France
- Language: French

Journey to Greenland (French: Le Voyage au Groenland) is a 2016 French comedy film directed by Sébastien Betbeder. The film was screened at the ACID event of the 2016 Cannes Film Festival. The film is about two friends, both of whom are actors in their thirties named Thomas, who decide, after going through a rough patch in their careers, to go to Kullorsuaq, Greenland, where Thomas's father, Nathan, lives.

== Cast ==
- Thomas Blanchard - Thomas
- Thomas Scimeca - Thomas
- François Chattot - Nathan
- Ole Eliassen - Ole
