= 17 Girls =

- Film poster
- Directed by: Delphine Coulin; Muriel Coulin
- Written by: Delphine Coulin; Muriel Coulin
- Produced by: Denis Freyd
- Starring: Louise Grinberg; Juliette Darche; Roxane Duran; Esther Garrel; Yara Pilartz; Solène Rigot
- Cinematography: Jean-Louis Vialard
- Edited by: Guy Lecorne
- Distributed by: Diaphana Films
- Release dates: 14 May 2011 (Cannes); 14 December 2011 (France)
- Running time: 86 minutes
- Country: France
- Language: French
- Budget: $3 million
- Box office: $716,542

17 Girls (French: 17 filles) is a 2011 French coming-of-age drama film written and directed by Delphine and Muriel Coulin and starring Louise Grinberg as a teenage girl who becomes pregnant, later influencing 16 other girls at her school to become pregnant as well. The film had its premiere at the 2011 Cannes Film Festival, before being theatrically released in France on 14 December 2011.

The film was inspired by an alleged pregnancy pact which took place at Gloucester High School in Massachusetts in 2008, which the 2010 American film The Pregnancy Pact is also based on.

== Plot ==
In Lorient, Camille is a teenage girl who finds herself pregnant by a one-time sexual partner after the condom breaks. Camille lives with her overworked single mother whom she views as a neglectful parent, while her older brother has recently come home from being overseas fighting in the War in Afghanistan. She confides her pregnancy in her four friends – the insecure Julia, the intelligent Flavie, the childlike Clémentine, and the practical Mathilde – and is unsure of whether she wants to have an abortion. Camille ultimately decides to keep the baby, as she thinks that it will push her to make something of her life and that a child would provide her with unconditional love.

As rumors surrounding Camille's pregnancy spread throughout their school, Florence, an unpopular student whom Camille and her friends repeatedly rebuff, confides in Camille that she is also pregnant, leading Camille to invite her to join her group of friends. Camille informs her mother that she is pregnant and keeping the baby, which leads to an argument between the two where Camille claims that she will be a more understanding mother to her future child than her mother is to her.

Camille proposes to her friends that they join her and Florence in getting pregnant together, as they would be more understanding mothers than their parents are, and could raise their children together. While Julia, Flavie, and Clémentine respond positively to the suggestion, Mathilde declines to participate. At a party that weekend, Camille speaks with the father of her baby for the first time since their sexual encounter, and she agrees to allow him to assume no parental responsibilities once the child is born, later confiding in Julia about the conversation. Julia and Flavie go on to both have unprotected sex with boys with the intention of being impregnated by them, with Julia having sex with the father of Camille's baby after asking her for permission. Despite trying to have sex, Clémentine becomes upset after being unable to find a boy to do it with, believing that she is looked at by others as a little girl and not a young woman.

Soon afterwards, Julia and Flavie both discover that they are pregnant, causing controversy at their school as faculty members attempt to brainstorm ways to combat the increasing amount of teenage pregnancies amongst their students. The girls plan to emancipate themselves from their parents and live off of welfare while raising their children together in their own commune. Soon, more girls at school outside of Camille's social circle begin to become pregnant as well, causing further concern amongst parents, boys at school, and faculty members, who threaten to expel Camille from school, while the story begins to spread through the media as well. Desperate to join her friends, Clémentine propositions a loner boy, offering him €50 in exchange for impregnating her; despite initially rejecting her offer, he ultimately accepts, and Clémentine becomes pregnant.

As Camille begins to plan for her future as a mother, her relationship with her own mother begins to improve. Meanwhile, Clémentine's parents respond aggressively to discovering that she is pregnant, and with the help of Camille and the other girls, she runs away to live in an abandoned mobile home in Étel where they intend to establish their commune. After being left alone in the mobile home during a thunderstorm, Clémentine decides to return to her parents, who begin to accept her pregnancy. The girls later discover that Florence is not actually pregnant and had been lying the entire time, and cast her out of the group.

Following a minor road accident, Camille suffers a miscarriage. Afterwards, Camille and her mother vanish from town, without informing any of her friends where she was going and only contacting her former friends following the births of their children. The remainder of the pregnant girls have their babies, but lose touch and do not end up raising their children together as they had initially planned.

== Cast ==
- Louise Grinberg as Camille
- Juliette Darche as Julia
- Roxane Duran as Florence
- Esther Garrel as Flavie
- Yara Pilartz as Clémentine
- Solène Rigot as Mathilde
- Noémie Lvovsky as the school nurse
- Florence Thomassin as Camille's mother
- Carlo Brandt as the headmaster
- Frédéric Noaille as Florian
- Arthur Verret as Tom
- Jocelyne Desverchèr as Clémentine's mother
- Serge Moati as the television journalist

== Reception ==
Première likened 17 Girls to The Virgin Suicides by Sofia Coppola saying "same languid pop, same delicately grainy picture, same kind of heterogeneous female cast, same absence of boys, reduced to the roles of stooges".

== Awards and nominations ==
- Nominated for the Camera d'Or at the 2011 Cannes Film Festival
- Won the Michel d'Ornano Award at the Deauville American Film Festival
- Nominated for the 2012 César Award for Best First Feature Film
