= Delphine and Muriel Coulin =

French film director duo

Delphine Coulin
- Born: 1972 (age 53–54); Hennebont, France
- Occupations: Novelist, film director, screenwriter
- Years active: 1997–present

Muriel Coulin
- Born: Hennebont, France
- Occupations: Film director, screenwriter, cinematographer, camera assistant
- Years active: 1990–present

Delphine and Muriel Coulin are French sisters who form a directing duo. They are best known for their film 17 Girls.

== Early career ==
Muriel Coulin began work as a cinematographer and camera assistant throughout the 1990s. Delphine is also a novelist. The sisters began collaborating on films in 1997 with the short film Il faut imaginer Sisyphe heureux (a reference to Albert Camus' The Myth of Sisyphus).

== Film career ==
The sisters made their feature film debut in 2011 with the film 17 Girls which was loosely based on the story of a group of American teenage girls who decided to become pregnant at the same time. The film played at the 2011 Cannes Film Festival.

In 2015 the sisters announced that their second film would be The Stopover, starring actress/singer Soko. The film premiered at the 2016 Cannes Film Festival in the Un Certain Regard section. They jointly won the award for Best Screenplay from the Un Certain Regard jury.

== Filmography ==
- Il faut imaginer Sisyphe heureux (1997)
- 17 Girls (2011)
- The Stopover (2016)
- The Quiet Son (2024)

== Bibliography ==
- Les Traces, Éditions Grasset, 2004 ISBN 978-2-246-67061-2
- Une seconde de plus, Éditions Grasset, 2006 ISBN 978-2-246-71391-3
- Les mille-vies, Éditions du Seuil, 2008 ISBN 978-2-02-098261-0
- Samba pour la France, Éditions du Seuil, 2011 ISBN 978-2-02-102854-6 - Prix du roman métis des lycéens
- Voir du pays, Éditions Grasset, 2013 ISBN 978-2-246-80863-3
- Une Fille dans la jungle, Éditions Grasset et Fasquelle, 2017 ISBN 978-2-246-81434-4
- Loin, à l'ouest, Editions Grasset & Fasquelle, 2021 ISBN 978-2-246-82420-6

== Awards ==
- Prix du roman métis des lycéens 2011 for Samba pour la France
