= A Faithful Man =

2018 film by Louis Garrel

- Theatrical release poster
- French: L'Homme fidèle
- Directed by: Louis Garrel
- Written by: Jean-Claude Carrière; Louis Garrel; Florence Seyvos (Note: Collaboration)
- Produced by: Pascal Caucheteux
- Starring: Laetitia Casta; Lily-Rose Depp; Joseph Engel; Louis Garrel
- Cinematography: Irina Lubtchansky
- Edited by: Joëlle Hache
- Production company: Why Not Productions
- Distributed by: Ad Vitam Distribution
- Release dates: 9 September 2018 (TIFF); 26 December 2018 (France)
- Running time: 75 minutes
- Country: France
- Language: French
- Box office: $1.9 million

A Faithful Man (French: L'Homme fidèle) is a 2018 French romantic comedy-drama film directed by Louis Garrel, from a screenplay he co-wrote with Jean-Claude Carrière. It stars Laetitia Casta, Lily-Rose Depp, Joseph Engel and Garrel.

The film had its world premiere at the Toronto International Film Festival on 9 September 2018. It was released in France on 26 December 2018 by Ad Vitam Distribution.

== Plot ==
Abel learns that his girlfriend, Marianne, is leaving him for his best friend Paul, who is the father of her child. Seven or eight years later, Paul dies and Abel and Marianne resolve to restart their relationship. Abel then moves in with Marianne and Joseph. Joseph claims that his father died because Marianne poisoned him. Abel is also sought after by Ève, Paul's younger sister who has been infatuated with Abel since she was 14 years old. When Ève directly tells Marianne to leave Abel or "it's war", Marianne prompts the confused Abel to sleep with Ève. Now caught in a difficult situation between two women and a young boy with an eerie fixation on murder, will Abel keep his relationship with Marianne intact?

== Cast ==
- Louis Garrel as Abel
- Laetitia Casta as Marianne
- Lily-Rose Depp as Ève
- Joseph Engel as Joseph

== Production ==
In February 2018, it was announced Louis Garrel would direct the film, from a screenplay he co-wrote with Jean-Claude Carrière, and star in the film, alongside Laetitia Casta and Lily-Rose Depp. Why Not Productions produced the film.

== Release ==
The film had its world premiere at the Toronto International Film Festival on 9 September 2018, followed by its US premiere at the New York Film Festival. Shortly thereafter, Kino Lorber acquired US distribution rights to the film. It was released in France on 26 December 2018 by Ad Vitam Distribution. In the United States, it received a limited theatrical release on 19 July 2019.

=== Critical reception ===
On the review aggregator website Rotten Tomatoes, A Faithful Man holds an approval rating of 81% based on 57 reviews, with an average of 6.7/10. The website's critics consensus reads, "A Faithful Man's lack of tonal commitment may frustrate, but the end results should still prove entertaining for viewers in the mood for a French romantic farce." Metacritic, which uses a weighted average, assigned the film a score of 67 out of 100, based on 15 critics, indicating "generally favorable reviews".
