= Katayoon Shahabi =

Iranian film producer

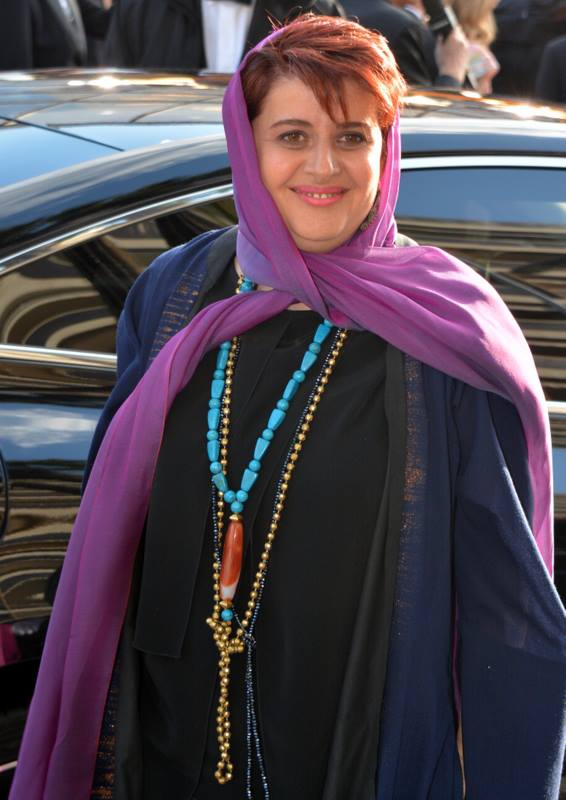
- Shahabi at the 2016 Cannes Film Festival
- Born: 1968 (age 57–58); Iran
- Occupations: Film producer CEO of Noori Pictures
- Years active: 2005–present

Katayoon Shahabi (born 1968) is an Iranian film producer and CEO of Shahrzad Media International. In April 2016 she was named as one of the jury members for the main competition section of the 2016 Cannes Film Festival.
