= Ulysses & Mona =

2018 film

- Directed by: Sébastien Betbeder
- Written by: Sébastien Betbeder
- Starring: Manal Issa; Eric Cantona
- Release date: 6 September 2018 (TIFF)
- Running time: 82 minutes
- Country: France
- Language: French

Ulysses & Mona (French: Ulysse & Mona) is a 2018 French drama film directed by Sébastien Betbeder. It was screened in the Contemporary World Cinema section at the 2018 Toronto International Film Festival.

== Cast ==
- Manal Issa as Mona
- Eric Cantona as Ulysse
- Mathis Romani as Arthur
- Marie Vialle as Alice
- Quentin Dolmaire as Camille
