= Louise Grinberg =

French actress (born 1993)

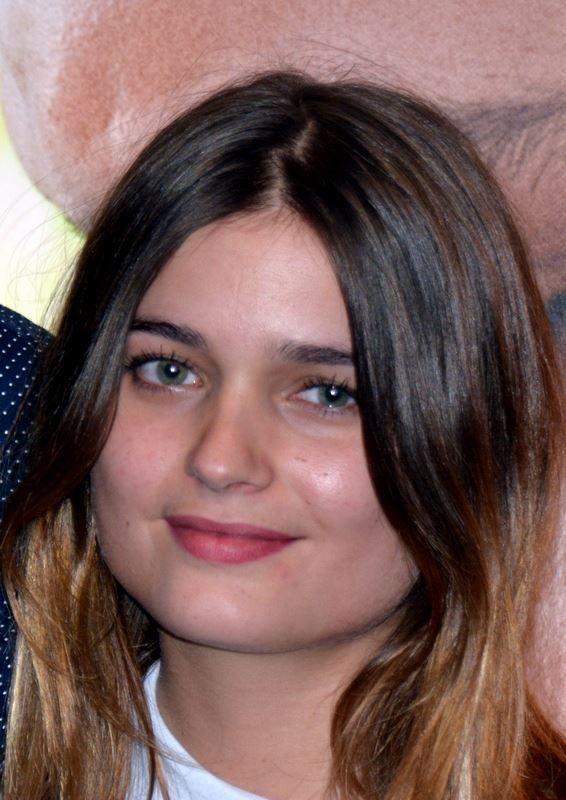
- Grinberg in 2016
- Born: 1993 (age 31–32); Paris, France
- Occupation: Actress
- Years active: 2008–present

Louise Grinberg (born 1993) is a French actress.

== Career ==
She made her film debut in 2008 in the French drama The Class where she played a schoolgirl. The film won a Golden Palm at Cannes. After participating in this film, she decided to become an actress. She played the lead role in the 2011 film 17 Girls. The following year she played the daughter of Denis Ménochet in the romantic comedy Je me suis fait tout petit. In 2014, she appeared in the comedy À toute épreuve, with Thomas Solivéres and Samy Seghir.

== Personal life ==
She is the niece of actress Anouk Grinberg.

== Filmography ==
Year	Film	Role	Director	Notes
2008	The Class	Louise	Laurent Cantet	Acted under her own name.
2011	17 Girls	Camille	Delphine Coulin and Muriel Coulin	
2012	Je me suis fait tout petit	Elise	Cécilia Rouaud	
2012	Destinée		Luca Guadagnino	Short film
2013	Vitalic: Fade Away		Romain Chassaing	Music film
2014	À toute épreuve		Antoine Blossier	
2014	Breathe		Mélanie Laurent	
2016	Tour de France		Rachid Djaïdani	
2018	The Prayer			
2018	Cities of Last Things	Ara	Wi Ding Ho	
