= Happy Times Will Come Soon =

2016 film

- Directed by: Alessandro Comodin
- Written by: Alessandro Comodin
- Starring: Sabrina Seyvecou
- Release date: 14 May 2016 (Cannes)
- Running time: 100 minutes
- Country: Italy
- Language: Italian

Happy Times Will Come Soon (Italian: I tempi felici verranno presto) is a 2016 Italian drama film directed by Alessandro Comodin. It was screened in the Critics' Week section at the 2016 Cannes Film Festival.

== Cast ==
- Sabrina Seyvecou
- Marinella Cichello
- Marco Giordana
- Luca Bernardi
- Paolo Viano
- Carlo Rigoni
- Erikas Sizonovas
