= The Family Whistle =

2016 documentary film

The Family Whistle is a 2016 documentary film exploring the origins of the famed Coppola family of musicians and filmmakers, written and directed by Michele Russo.

The famed Coppola family of filmmakers and musicians descends from Agostino Coppola, a poor immigrant from an impoverished village in Southern Italy. Interviews and archival footage portray how the family history has inspired these artists, and how they continue to renew their ties to the land of their origin.

Director Michele Russo was himself born in Bernalda, the city the Coppola family originated from. He picked olives as a child to see the first Godfather movie, and was later told by his parents that the film's director Francis Ford Coppola was his distant cousin, and the Coppola family originated from the same town. Years later, as a drama student in Milan, Russo contacted Coppola, who invited him to meet him in Rome and later cast him as Spara in The Godfather Part III.

Awards and nominations

Award: Ugo Lo Pinto, Indie Spec Best Cinematography Award at the 14th Annual Boston International Film Festival

Nomination: Michele Russo, L'Œil d'or at the 69th Annual 2016 Cannes Film Festival

Nomination: Michele Russo, Caméra d'Or at the 69th Annual 2016 Cannes Film Festival
