= Album (2016 film) =

2016 film

- Film poster
- Directed by: Mehmet Can Mertoğlu
- Written by: Mehmet Can Mertoğlu
- Produced by: Yoel Meranda; Eytan İpeker
- Starring: Sebnem Bozoklu; Murat Kiliç
- Cinematography: Marius Panduru
- Edited by: Ayhan Ergürsel; Mehmet Can Mertoğlu
- Distributed by: Le Pacte (France)
- Release date: 12 May 2016 (Cannes)
- Running time: 105 minutes
- Countries: Turkey; France; Romania
- Language: Turkish

Album (Turkish: Albüm) is a 2016 Turkish comedy film directed by Mehmet Can Mertoğlu. It was screened in the Critics' Week section at the 2016 Cannes Film Festival where it won the France 4 Visionary Award.

== Cast ==
- Sebnem Bozoklu as Bahar Bahtiyaroglu
- Murat Kiliç as Cüneyt Bahtiyaroglu
