= The Crusade (film) =

- French: La Croisade
- Directed by: Louis Garrel
- Written by: Louis Garrel; Jean-Claude Carrière
- Produced by: Pascal Caucheteux
- Starring: Louis Garrel; Laetitia Casta; Joseph Engel
- Cinematography: Julien Poupard
- Edited by: Joelle Hache
- Music by: Grégoire Hetzel
- Production company: Why Not Productions
- Distributed by: Ad Vitam Distribution
- Release dates: 12 July 2021 (Cannes); 22 December 2021 (France)
- Running time: 67 minutes
- Country: France
- Language: French

The Crusade (French: La Croisade) is a 2021 French drama film directed by Louis Garrel, from a screenplay by Garrel and Jean-Claude Carrière. It stars Garrel, Laetitia Casta and Joseph Engel. It had its world premiere at the Cannes Film Festival on 12 July 2021. It was released in France on 22 December 2021.

== Plot ==
Abel and Marianne have discovered their son has smuggled valuable items to finance a mysterious project with other children to save the planet.

== Cast ==
- Louis Garrel as Abel
- Laetitia Casta as Marianne
- Joseph Engel as Joseph
- Ilinka Lony as Clotilde
- Julia Boème as Lucie
- Lionel Dray as Jérôme Lhomond
- Clémence Jeanguillaume as Audrey Lhomond

== Release ==
The film had its world premiere at the Cannes Film Festival on 12 July 2021. It was theatrically released in France on 22 December 2021 by Ad Vitam Distribution.
