= Marie-Ange Casta =

French actress, model, and stylist

Marie-Ange Casta is a French actress, model and stylist. She is the younger sister of Laetitia Casta.
