= The Incredible Snow Woman =

2025 French comedy drama film by Sébastien Betbeder

- Promotional poster
- French: L’ Incroyable femme des neiges
- Directed by: Sébastien Betbeder
- Written by: Sébastien Betbeder
- Produced by: Frédéric Dubreuil; Sarah Derny
- Starring: Blanche Gardin; Philippe Katerine; Bastien Bouillon; Ole Eliassen; Martin Jensen
- Cinematography: Pierre-Hubert Martin
- Edited by: Julie Lena
- Music by: Ensemble 0
- Production companies: Envie de Tempête Productions; Sedna Films [fr]
- Distributed by: KMBO; Be For Films
- Release date: 17 February 2025 (Berlinale)
- Running time: 101 minutes
- Country: France
- Language: French

The Incredible Snow Woman (French: L’ Incroyable femme des neiges) is a 2025 French comedy drama film directed by Sébastien Betbeder. The film starring Blanche Gardin, Philippe Katerine, and Bastien Bouillon revolves around Coline Morel's solo travelling across Greenland, camping on an ice floe, and even single-handedly wrestling a bear, but these feats no longer faze Morel. Yet, the prospect of facing her own existence is daunting.

It was selected in the Panorama section at the 75th Berlin International Film Festival and was screened on 17 February 2025.

== Synopsis ==
After losing her job and getting dumped by her boyfriend, and in falling health, Coline Morel, a 46-year-old Arctic explorer known as "The Incredible Snow Woman," unexpectedly returns to her childhood home in the Jura Mountains to reunite with her brothers, Basile and Lolo. There, she reconnects with Christophe, her first love. As her world crumbles, she fights to reclaim her life and make one final comeback amidst mounting personal challenges.

== Cast ==
- Blanche Gardin as Coline
- Philippe Katerine as Basil
- Bastien Bouillon as Lolo
- Ole Eliassen
- Martin Jensen
- Laurent Papot
- Ferdinand Redouloux
- Hartmann Heilmann
- Ane Marie Havmoller-Jorgensen
- Clémentine Baert
- Aymeric Lompret

== Production ==
In December 2023, children and teenagers were invited to join the cast of the film in Haut-Doubs for filming in March and April 2024. In February 2024, people were recruited to play extras in the film.

In February 2024, Blanche Gardin and Philippe Katerine were cast in the film.

Principal photography began on 11 March 2024 on locations in Jura region and Groenland. The filming in the Haut-Doubs ended on 28 March 2024. The filming ended on 28 April 2024, after shooting in regions of France – Bourgogne-Franche-Comté, and Greenland.

== Release ==
The Incredible Snow Woman had its World premiere in the Panorama section of the 75th Berlin International Film Festival on 17 February 2025.

The film was screened in the 'Temps Ø' for its Canadian Premiere at the 2025 Festival du nouveau cinéma on 9 October 2025, and in International Perspective at the São Paulo International Film Festival on 16 October 2025.

On 8 November 2025, it was presented in Previews section of Arras Film Festival.

In February 2026, it will be presented for its United States premiere in the feature films section of the 41st Santa Barbara International Film Festival.

Be For Films acquired the international sales rights to the film in January 2025.

== Accolades ==
| Award | Date | Category | Recipient | Result | Ref. |
|---|---|---|---|---|---|
| Berlin International Film Festival | 23 February 2025 | Panorama Audience Award for Best Feature Film | Sébastien Betbeder | Nominated | |
