= Joseph Engel =

French actor

Joseph Engel is a French actor.

He is most noted for his performance as Bastien in the 2022 film Falcon Lake, for which he received a Canadian Screen Award nomination for Best Lead Performance in a Film at the 11th Canadian Screen Awards in 2023.

He previously appeared in the films A Faithful Man and The Crusade.

== Filmography ==
Year	Title	Role	Refs
2018	A Faithful Man (L'Homme fidèle)	Joseph	
2021	The Crusade (La Croisade)	Joseph	
2022	Falcon Lake	Bastien	
