= The Stopover =

- Film poster
- French: Voir du pays
- Literally: See the country
- Directed by: Delphine Coulin; Muriel Coulin
- Screenplay by: Delphine Coulin; Muriel Coulin
- Based on: Voir du pays by Delphine Coulin
- Produced by: Denis Freyd
- Starring: Soko; Ariane Labed
- Cinematography: Jean-Louis Vialard
- Edited by: Laurence Briaud
- Distributed by: Diaphana Films (France); Feelgood Entertainment (Greece)
- Release dates: 17 May 2016 (Cannes); 7 September 2016 (France)
- Running time: 102 minutes
- Countries: France; Greece
- Language: French
- Budget: $3.5 million
- Box office: $227.000

The Stopover (French: Voir du pays, lit. 'See the country') is a 2016 French film directed by Delphine and Muriel Coulin. It explores the tensions among a group of French soldiers returning from a tour of duty in Afghanistan, focusing on the experiences of three young women. The film premiered at the 2016 Cannes Film Festival in the Un Certain Regard section where the sisters won the award for Best Screenplay.

== Plot ==
After a tour of duty in Afghanistan, a group of French soldiers are flown for a three-day stay at a luxurious beach hotel in Cyprus. The stay is not only for rest and relaxation, since the Army also uses the break to address the psychological effects of returning to France from a high-stress environment in which comrades have been wounded or killed. As well as enjoying themselves, the soldiers have to participate in group therapy sessions where individuals, sometimes painfully, are made to relive moments of danger and terror.

But the tension is still there under the surface. Three of the French women accept the offer of a drive into the mountains with two Cypriot men, which results in drinking, dancing, and sex. Three of the French men go in search of them, while also intoxicated rescue their comrades, and then, to punish their disloyalty, stop in the woods in an attempt to rape them. After drunken struggles among the trees, the men drive off and the women are left to walk all the way back to the hotel. The next morning everything seemingly returns to normal, with military discipline resumed as the soldiers, men and women together, board a plane for Paris.

== Cast ==
- Soko as Marine
- Ariane Labed as Aurore
- Ginger Romàn as Fanny
- Karim Leklou as Max
- Andreas Konstantinou as Chrystos
- Makis Papadimitriou as Harry
- Alexis Manenti as Jonathan
- Robin Barde as Toni
- Sylvain Loreau as Momo
- Jérémie Laheurte as Ness
- Damien Bonnard as The lieutenant
