= En Moi =

- Directed by: Laetitia Casta
- Written by: Laetitia Casta; Maud Ameline
- Produced by: Laetitia Casta; Lionel Massol; Pauline Seigland
- Starring: Yvan Attal; Lara Stone; Mathilde Bisson
- Cinematography: Benoît Delhomme
- Edited by: Fabrice Rouaud
- Music by: Koudlam
- Production companies: Allarosa Production; Films Grand Huit
- Release date: 19 May 2016 (Cannes)
- Running time: 26 minutes
- Country: France
- Language: French

En Moi (also known as In Me) is a 2016 French short film directed, written and produced by Laetitia Casta in her directorial debut.

The film had its world premiere at the closing ceremony of the 2016 Cannes Critics' Week.

== Plot ==
The filmmaker, portrayed by Yvan Attal, anxiously searches for inspiration on his film set among the Beaux-Arts architecture of the mysterious Palais Garnier where his imagination gives him the desire to have a yen for creating.

== Cast ==
- Yvan Attal as the film director
- Lara Stone as the woman
- Arthur Igual as the assistant
- Mathilde Bisson as the actress
- Jérémie Bélingard as the lover
- Akaji Maro 『麿赤兒』 as the handyman
- Nassim Amaouche as the driver

== Production ==
=== Development ===
In March 2016, it was announced that Laetitia Casta would make her directorial debut with the film. Casta co-wrote the screenplay with Maud Ameline. The film was produced by Casta under the banner of Allarosa production, executively produced by Lionel Massol, and co-executive produced by Pauline Seigland of Films Grand Huit.

=== Casting ===
In March 2016, it was reported that the French actress Mathilde Bisson (Cactus Flower, Nearest to the Sun) would be starring in the film. She would be joined in the cast by Yvan Attal (Munich, The Interpreter, Rush Hour 3), Lara Stone, Arthur Igual, Paris Opera Ballet Danseur Étoile Jérémie Bélingard, Akaji Maro (Kill Bill), and Nassim Amaouche (Adieu Gary).

In May 2016, Casta gives the reasons for the choice of the leading actress Stone:

'Lara was perfect because she was exactly where this character is at. I had worked with her on a commercial and she had no confidence in herself whatsoever: she was like a child you want to nurse and take in your arms. At the same time, there was this incredible strength about her in front of the camera. This strange mix reminded me of many things and so I told myself that one day I would shoot a film with her.'

— Laetitia Casta, WWD

=== Filming ===
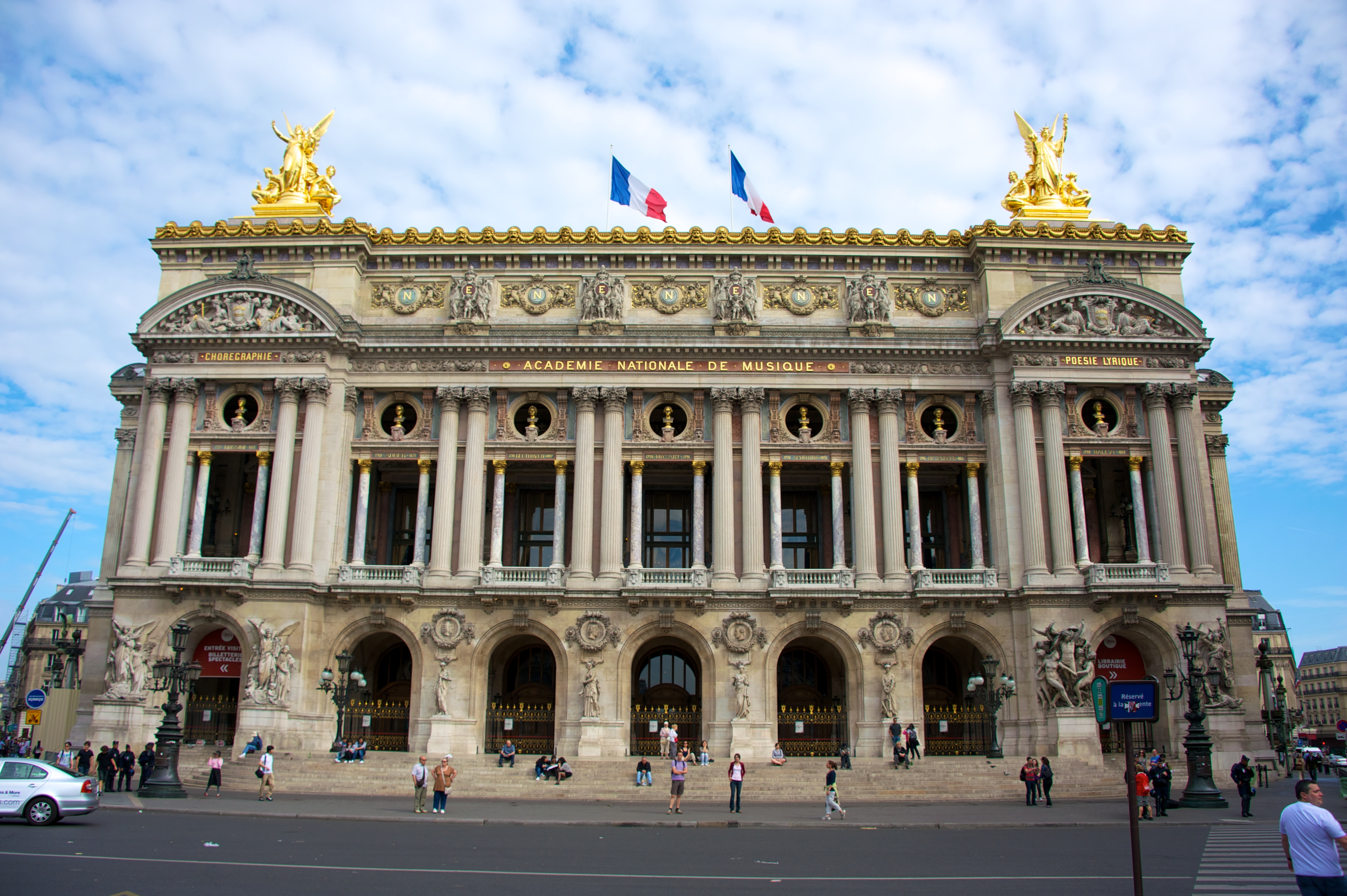
Opéra Garnier is the film set.

Principal photography for the film began in August 2015 in the Paris Opera.

=== Background ===
Since the film's release on 19 May 2016 at the Cannes Film Festival Critics' Week, the original theatrical movie poster features Lara Stone and Yvan Attal.
