= Thomas Blanchard (actor) =

French actor (born 1980)

- Born: 16 July 1980 (age 45); Angers, France
- Occupation: Actor
- Years active: 1997-present

Thomas Blanchard (born 16 July 1980) is a French actor. He has appeared in more than thirty films since 1997.

== Selected filmography ==
Year	Title	Role	Notes
2003	No Rest for the Brave	Igor	
2014	2 Autumns, 3 Winters	Jean	
2015	Caprice	Jean	
2015	Prejudice	Cedric	
2016	Journey To Greenland	Thomas	
