= Katryn Kruger =

South African fashion model (born 1995)

- Born: 14 April 1995 (age 31); Cape Town, South Africa
- Spouse: Cilliers Kies (m. 2015)
- Modeling information
- Height: 1.80 m (5 ft 11 in)
- Hair color: Dark brown
- Eye color: Blue-green
- Agency: IMG Models (New York, Paris, London, Sydney); Uno Models (Barcelona); Munich Models (Munich)

Katryn Kruger (born 14 April 1995 in Cape Town, South Africa) is a South African fashion model.

== Career ==
Kruger was discovered in a South African shopping mall. One of her very first jobs was Givenchy and a Prada campaign in 2012. She has walked the runway for Elie Saab, Tommy Hilfiger, Jason Wu, LOEWE, Chloé, Ralph Lauren, Giambattista Valli, Calvin Klein, Rag & Bone, Valentino, Diane von Fürstenberg, Missoni, Derek Lam, Victoria Beckham, Sonia Rykiel, Marc by Marc Jacobs, Roland Mouret, and Prabal Gurung among others.

She has appeared in ad campaigns for Oscar de la Renta, Prada, and Dior.

== Personal life ==
Kruger is married to South African doctor Cilliers Kies. She plans to go to university after modeling.
