= Mix Brasil =

Brazilian LGBTQ website

Mix Brasil is the biggest Brazilian LGBT site on web. It was formed in 1993 and in the following year, by the same organizers and bearing the same name, one of the most important Brazilian GLBTT Internet portals of pop Queer information was formed. Mix Brasil is also a publishing house, responsible for Junior, lifestyle gay magazine.

== Movie Festival ==
They also co-ordinate an internationally renowned Brazilian movie festival about human sexual diversity. The attractions count with a national competition of short films and exhibitions of international movies, everything with LGBT themes.
