= Laetitia Casta =

French actress and model

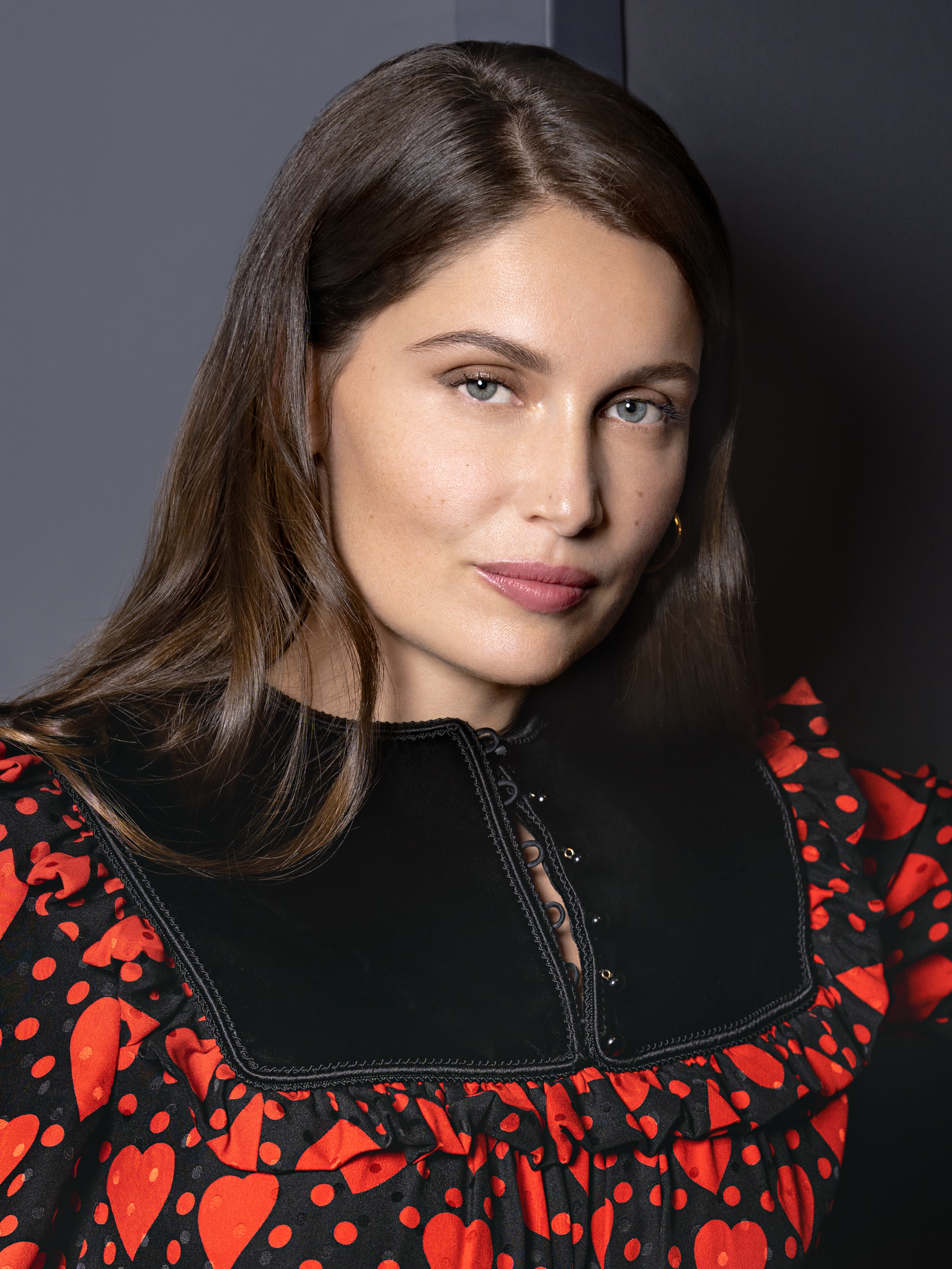
- Casta in 2020
- Born: Laetitia Marie Laure Casta; 11 May 1978 (age 48); Pont-Audemer, Normandy, France
- Occupations: Model; actress
- Years active: 1993–present
- Known for: Born in 68; Gainsbourg: A Heroic Life; A Faithful Man
- Spouse: Louis Garrel (m. 2017–2025)
- Children: 4
- Modeling information
- Height: 5 ft 7 in (1.70 m)
- Agency: DNA Model Management (New York); VIVA Model Management (Paris, London, Barcelona)
- Website: laetitia-casta.fr

Laetitia Marie Laure Casta (French: [lɛtisja kasta]; born 11 May 1978) is a French model and actress.

Casta became a "GUESS? Girl" in 1993 and gained further recognition as a Victoria's Secret Angel from 1998 to 2000 and as a spokesperson for cosmetics company L'Oréal. She has appeared on over 250 covers of such popular magazines as Cosmopolitan, Vogue, Rolling Stone, Elle and Glamour, and has walked runways for designers such as Yves Saint Laurent, Jean-Paul Gaultier, Chanel, Dior, Dolce & Gabbana, Paco Rabanne, Kenzo, Louis Vuitton, Christian Lacroix, Roberto Cavalli, Jacquemus, Ralph Lauren and Vivienne Westwood.

As an actress, Casta appeared in such films as Asterix and Obelix vs. Caesar (1999), Born in 68 (2008), Face (2009), Gainsbourg: A Heroic Life (2010), which earned her a nomination for the César Award for Best Supporting Actress, Arbitrage (2012), A Faithful Man (2018) and The Crusade (2021).

== Early life ==
Laetitia Casta was born in Pont-Audemer, Normandy. Her mother, Line Blin, is from Normandy. Her father, Dominique Casta, is from Corsica. Casta has an older brother, Jean-Baptiste, and a younger sister, Marie-Ange. She spent her childhood in Normandy and Corsica.

Laetitia has one quarter Italian ancestry from her father.

== Career ==
=== Modeling ===
Casta's modeling career reportedly began when she was discovered at age 15 by the photographer Frédéric Cresseaux, after winning a village beauty pageant during a family holiday in her father's native Corsica She had been unknowingly signed up for the pageant by her brother Jean-Baptiste.

Casta has been the L'Oréal Paris brand ambassador since 1998. She has been featured in Pantene, Guess?, Tommy Hilfiger, Valentino, Givenchy, Ralph Lauren, Cacharel, Lolita Lempicka, Chanel, Dolce and Gabbana, Nina Ricci, Swarovski, Yves Saint Laurent, Louis Vuitton, Roberto Cavalli, Jacquemus, J. Crew, Tiffany & Co., Loewe, Bulgari, Giorgio Armani, H&M, Miu Miu, Pepe Jeans, Escada, Alberta Ferretti and XOXO ad campaigns. She has appeared on more than 250 magazine covers including Harper's Bazaar, Elle, Marie Claire, Glamour, Cosmopolitan, Vanity Fair, i-D, Rolling Stone and Vogue (Paris, España, Germany, Russia and Turkey). Casta was the last muse of fashion designer Yves Saint Laurent, serving as the bride in his fashion shows from 1998 to 2001. She walked down the annual Victoria's Secret Fashion Show in 1997, 1998, 1999, and 2000. She was one of the company's signature Victoria' Secret Angels from 1998 to 2000. She claims that her career with Victoria's Secret ended because she was "too much of [a] rebel". She also appeared in Sports Illustrated Swimsuit Issue three consecutive times, as well at the Pirelli Calendar 1999 by Herb Ritts, 2000 by Annie Leibovitz and 2019 by Albert Watson.

She is the face of fragrances Chanel's Allure, Givenchy's Forbidden flower, Lolita Lempicka's Lolita, Cacharel's Promise, Bulgari's BLV II, Ralph Lauren's Notorious, Yves Saint Laurent's Baby doll and Paris, Nina Ricci's L'Extase and D&G's Pour Femme. The Parisians could follow her Adventures in the Galeries Lafayette by Jean-Paul Goude. For Christmas 2011, Peter Lindbergh shot True Love, the very thought of Casta at the summit of Manhattan and between the snowy lions of marble of the New York Public Library for Tiffany & Co. On 10 March 2010, in Paris, she opened the Louis Vuitton fall/winter 2010 fashion show. On 27 September 2010, she closed the Roberto Cavalli spring/summer 2011 fashion show in Milan. On 18 January 2020, in Paris, she opened Jacquemus fall/winter 2020 fashion show. In September 2020, Casta appeared in the fall/winter ad campaign for Yves Saint Laurent and for Valentino.

She was ranked as an "Industry Icon" by models.com, and was ranked as a "New Super" as of 2021.

=== Acting ===
Her first role was as Falbala in Asterix & Obelix Take On Caesar directed by Claude Zidi, a live-action adaptation of the comic book Asterix, in which Obelix, portrayed by Gérard Depardieu, plays Casta's love interest. Casta appeared in Les Ames Fortes, directed by Raul Ruiz. Her performance as Brigitte Bardot in the movie Gainsbourg (Vie heroique) earned her a Cesar Award nomination. Casta served as a jury member at the 69th Venice International Film Festival in 2012.

=== Marianne controversy ===
In 1999, Casta was ranked first in a national survey ordered by the French Mayors' Association to decide who should be the new model for the bust of Marianne, an allegorical symbol of the French Republic, which stands inside every French town hall. Casta became the focus of a controversy when, after being selected to be Marianne, newspapers in Britain and France reported that she had relocated to London where taxes on high earners are lower. Casta's father said she went to London for professional reasons; on a TV show, she also said that she rented a flat in London to be near her boyfriend. The French minister of the interior spoke about Casta on the radio; comparing the advantages of living in France with regard to the drawbacks of London after political opponents used Casta's relocation to London as an opportunity to criticise the government.

== Political involvement ==
On 6 April 2008, Casta demonstrated in a White March of nonviolent protest to ask for the immediate release of Ingrid Betancourt, presidential candidate kidnapped since 2002 by the FARC. On 30 April 2002, she attended the demonstration Vive la République after the first round election of the 2002 presidential election.

She was appointed as a UNICEF Goodwill Ambassador on 9 December 2016.

== Personal life ==
On 19 October 2001, Casta gave birth to a daughter, whose father was her then-boyfriend, the photographer Stephane Sednaoui. Casta was later engaged to Italian actor Stefano Accorsi, with whom she has a son born in 2006 and a daughter born in 2009. In June 2017, Casta married her boyfriend of two years, French actor Louis Garrel; in 2021, she gave birth to a son. After divorcing in the summer of 2025, Casta began dating and was seen with the French labor lawyer Geoffrey Barthélémy Cennamo.

== Filmography ==
Year	Title	Role	Director	Notes
1999	Asterix et Obelix contre Cesar (Asterix & Obelix Take On Caesar)	Falbala	Claude Zidi	
2000	La Bicyclette Bleue (The Blue Bicycle)	Lea Delmas	Thierry Binisti	TV film for France2
2000	Gitano	Lucia Junco	Manuel Palacios	
2001	Les ames fortes (Savage Souls)	Therese	Raoul Ruiz	
2002	Rue des plaisirs (Love Street)	Marion	Patrice Leconte	Performs on the soundtrack
2003	Errance (Wandering)	Lou	Damien Odoul	
2004	Luisa Sanfelice	Luisa Sanfelice	Paolo Taviani; Vittorio Taviani	TV film for France2, RAI Uno
2006	Le grand appartement (The Big Apartment)	Francesca Cigalone	Pascal Thomas	
2006	La Deraison du Louvre (The Irrationality of the Louvre)	The young woman	Ange Leccia	Short film without dialog shot in the Louvre museum for which Casta was for the first time in cover of Les Cahiers du Cinéma.
2006	Nymphea (Nymphaea)	The naiad	Ange Leccia	Short film
2007	Le Petit Monde de Charlotte (Charlotte's Web)	Charlotte A. Cavatica	Gary Winick	Voice in the French-language dub.
2008	Nes en 68 (Born in 68)	Catherine	Olivier Ducastel Jacques Martineau	Cabourg: Golden Swann for Best Actress
2008	La jeune fille et les loups (The Maiden and the Wolves)	Angele Amblard	Gilles Legrand	
2009	Visage (Face) ? (in Chinese)	Salome	Tsai Ming-Liang	
2009	Fleurs dans le miroir, lune dans l'eau (Flowers in the mirror, moon in the water)	herself, Salome	Francois Lunel	
2010	Gainsbourg: A Heroic Life	Brigitte Bardot	Joann Sfar	Nominated — César Award for Best Supporting Actress
2011	La nouvelle guerre des boutons (The War of the Buttons)	Simone	Christophe Barratier	
2011	Derriere les murs (Behind the Walls)	Suzanne	Julien Lacombe Pascal Sid	
2011	Островът (Ostrovat) (The Island)	Sophie	Kamen Kalev	
2011	Rio	Perla (Jewel)	Carlos Saldanha	
2012	Arbitrage	Julie Cote	Nicholas Jarecki	
2012	Do Not Disturb	Anna	Yvan Attal	
2013	Une histoire d'amour (Tied)	The young woman	Helene Fillieres	
2014	Rio 2	Perla (Jewel)	Carlos Saldanha	
2014	A Woman as a Friend	Claudia	Giovanni Veronesi	
2014	Des lendemains qui chantent	Noemie Archambault	Nicolas Castro	
2014	Sous les jupes des filles	Agathe	Audrey Dana	
2016	En Moi	—N/a	Laetitia Casta	Short film Also writer and producer
2018	A Faithful Man	Marianne	Louis Garrel	
2018	The Ideal Palace	Philomene	Nils Tavernier	
2019	Le Milieu de l'horizon	Nicole	Delphine Lehericey	
2021	The Crusade	Marianne	Louis Garrel	
2022	Coma	Sharon (voice)	Bertrand Bonello	
2023	Consent	Vanessa's mother	Vanessa Filho	
2024	Una storia nera	Clara	Leonardo D'Agostini	
2026	Le crime du 3e étage	Colette Courreau / Rebacca Daumas-Gassac	Rémi Bezançon	
2026	Call My Agent! The Movie	Herself	Émilie Noblet	

== Music videos ==
Year	Singer	Song	Director
2010	Rihanna	"Te Amo"	Anthony Mandler
1999	Chris Isaak	"Baby Did a Bad Bad Thing"	Herb Ritts
1998	I Muvrini Sting	"Terre d'Oru" (in English, Corsican, and Greek)	Stefano Salvati

== Theatre ==
Year	Play	Role	Playwright	Stage director	Theatre	City	Review
2017	Scenes from a Marriage	Marianne	Ingmar Bergman	Safy Nebbou	Théâtre de l'Œuvre	Paris 9th	L'Express
2008	Elle t'attend (She is waiting for you)	Anna	Florian Zeller	Florian Zeller	Théâtre de la Madeleine	Paris 8th	Madame Figaro
2005 2004	Ondine	Ondine	Jean Giraudoux	Jacques Weber	Tour in regions Théâtre Antoine-Simone Berriau	Ludwigshafen Paris 10th	L'Humanité

== Humanitarian action ==
Year	Association	Comment
2010	Porteurs d'Eau	Water-carrier is an initiative of France Libertes - Danielle-Mitterrand foundation
2006	Rose Marie Claire	Casta among Claire Chazal, Isabelle Adjani, Axelle Red, Monica Bellucci and Tina Kieffer with the Rose Marie Claire are shot by Jeff Manzetti for the association Toutes a l'ecole
2005	Action Innocence	She belongs to the Committee of support of Action Innocence to protect children from online sexual predators.
2004	Action Contre la Faim	Casta drew a winged blue heart on a plate for the bidding of 19 November 2004 to help Action against Hunger
2002	Occi, paese rinascitu (in Corsican)	In the headquarters of the association Occi recovered village at the Caffe di a Mossa of Lumio in Corsica, Casta helped to reconstruct the old chapel of Annunziata in the abandoned village of Occi.

== Awards and recognition ==
Year	Award	By	Result
2021	Excellence Award Davide Campari	74th Locarno Film Festival	Won
2012	Chevalier dans l'Ordre des Arts et des Lettres (Knight in Order of Arts and of Letters)	France Minister of Culture and of Communication	Honored
2011	Nominated for the Cesar Award of the Best Supporting Actress as Brigitte Bardot in Gainsbourg (Vie heroique)	Cesar Awards	Nominated
2008	Golden Swann of the Best Actress as Catherine in Born in 68	Cabourg Film Festival (in French)	Won
2001	Ranked No. 1 Top 50 Most Beautiful Women	Askmen.com	
1999	Marianne for the 21st century	82nd congress of AMF, the French Mayors Association	Won

== Books ==
- Casta, Laetitia (24 November 1999). Assouline (ed.). Laetitia Casta (in French). Editions Assouline. ISBN 978-2-84323-179-7.
