= Apolo Awards =

Spanish LGBTQ film awards

The Apolo Awards (Spanish: Premios Apolo de cine LGTB) are annual awards given to the best LGBT-themed films that have been released in Spain. Since 2016 they have been awarded by LGBT culture outlet Dos Manzanas, with the intention to highlight high-quality filmmaking in order to encourage more LGBT-themed works to be distributed in the country.

== History ==
The Apolo Awards were founded in 2016 by Dos Manzanas. The magazine and website Dos Manzanas reports on LGBT culture in Spain as well as advocating for LGBT+ equality. After informally awarding LGBT-themed book awards in 2015, Dos Manzanas started the Apolo Awards, referencing Olympian god Apollo, with an aim to vindicate distributing LGBT-themed works in Spain by celebrating the high quality of LGBT+ films. They also award the Spanish distributors who help combat LGBT-phobia by showing the films. Many nominees and winners are thus the best international productions, with fewer Spanish films, as well as the local distributors of them.

For the 2016 awards, the Best Song category was added. In response to more LGBT-themed films being released, particularly by international streaming services, the 2021 awards upped the nominations per category to four (from three) for most, and to ten (from five) for Best Film. It also added three new categories to better appreciate more diverse films, each with five nominees: Best Comedy, Best Documentary, and Best Spanish Film.

== Categories ==
=== Production ===
- Best Adapted Screenplay (Mejor Guion Adaptado)
- Best Production Design (Mejor Dirección Artística)
- Best Cinematography (Mejor Fotografía)
- Best Comedy (Mejor Comedia)*
- Best Costume Design (Mejor Vestuario)
- Best Director (Mejor Dirección)
- Best Documentary (Mejor Documental)*
- Best Editing (Mejor Montaje)
- Best Film (Mejor Película)
- Best Hair and Make-Up (Mejor Maquillaje y Peluquería)
- Best New Director (Mejor Dirección Novel)
- Best Original Music (Mejor Música Original)
- Best Original Screenplay (Mejor Guion Original)
- Best Song/Original Song (Mejor Canción/Original)
- Best Sound (Mejor Sonido)
- Best Spanish Film (Mejor Película Española)*

*Introduced for 2021 awards (VIIth edition)

=== Acting ===
- Best Actor (Mejor Actor)
- Best Actress (Mejor Actriz)
- Best Ensemble Cast (Mejor Reparto)
- Best Couple (Mejor Pareja)
- Best New Actor (Mejor Actor Revelación)
- Best New Actress (Mejor Actriz Revelación)
- Best Supporting Actor (Mejor Actor Secundario/de Reparto)
- Best Supporting Actress (Mejor Actriz Secundaria/de Reparto)

== Awards ==
Films are nominated based on the year during which they were first distributed in Spain; the awards are given in January of the following year.

=== 2015 ===
==== Production ====
Best Film: Pride (Golem)‡; The Club (Caramel Films); Grandma (Sony Pictures); The New Girlfriend (Golem); The Way He Looks (Surtsey Films)	Best Director: Pablo Larraín – The Club (Caramel Films)‡; François Ozon – The New Girlfriend (Golem); Matthew Warchus – Pride (Golem)
Best Original Screenplay: Stephen Beresford – Pride (Golem)‡; Guillermo Calderón, Pablo Larraín and Daniel Villalobos – The Club (Caramel Films); Paul Weitz – Grandma (Sony Pictures)	Best Adapted Screenplay: Daniel Ribeiro – The Way He Looks (Surtsey Films)‡; Matthew Chapman and Julie Sayres – Reaching for the Moon (Splendor Films España); François Ozon – The New Girlfriend (Golem)
Best Cinematography: Lyle Vincent – A Girl Walks Home Alone at Night (La Aventura Audiovisual)‡; Pablo García Pérez de Lara – Tchindas (Pirámide Films); Urszula Pontikos – Lilting (Surtsey Films)	Best Editing: Bryan Mason – 52 Tuesdays (Cine Binario)‡; Yorgos Lamprinos – Xenia (Karma Films); Sebastián Sepúlveda – The Club (Caramel Films)
Best New Director: Hong Khaou – Lilting (Surtsey Films)‡; Ana Lily Amirpour – A Girl Walks Home Alone at Night (La Aventura Audiovisual); Sophie Hyde – 52 Tuesdays (Cine Binario)	Best Production Design: José Joaquim Salles – Reaching for the Moon (Splendor Films España)‡; Michel Barthélémy, Pascal Leguellec and Nathalie Roubaud – The New Girlfriend (Golem); Alain Ortiz – The King of Havana (Filmax)
Best Costume Design: Pascaline Chavanne – The New Girlfriend (Golem)‡; Vassilios Barbarigos – Xenia (Karma Films); Marcelo Pies – Reaching for the Moon (Splendor Films España)	Best Hair and Make-Up: Gill Robillard and Franck-Pascal Alquinet – The New Girlfriend (Golem)‡; Louise Cockburn and Jill Fogel – A Girl Walks Home Alone at Night (La Aventura Audiovisual); Denise Kum, Roo Maurice, Ivana Primorac and Amy Riley – The Imitation Game (Tripictures)
Best Sound: Marc Serena and Verònica Font – Tchindas (Pirámide Films)‡; Jamie Caple, Tony Gibson, Blair Jollands and Martin Trevis – Pride (Golem); Miguel Hormazábal, Roberto Zuñiga, Ivo Moraga, Salomé Román and Mauricio Molina – The Club (Caramel Films)	Best Original Music: Alexandre Desplat – The Imitation Game (Tripictures)‡; Philippe Rombi – The New Girlfriend (Golem); Marcelo Zarvos – Reaching for the Moon (Splendor Films España)

- Best Song was not awarded

==== Acting ====
Best Actor: Romain Duris – The New Girlfriend as David / Virginia (Golem)‡; Benedict Cumberbatch – The Imitation Game as Alan Turing (Tripictures); Willem Dafoe – Pasolini as Pier Paolo Pasolini (Good Films)	Best Actress: Lily Tomlin – Grandma as Elle (Sony Pictures)‡; Cheng Pei-pei – Lilting as Junn (Surtsey Films); Miranda Otto – Reaching for the Moon as Elizabeth Bishop (Splendor Films España)
Best Supporting Actor: Roberto Farías – The Club as Sandokan (Caramel Films)‡; Alfredo Castro – The Club as Padre Vidal (Caramel Films); Andrew Scott – Pride as Gethin Roberts (Golem)	Best Supporting Actress: Keira Knightley – The Imitation Game as Joan Clarke (Tripictures)‡; Glória Pires – Reaching for the Moon as Lota de Macedo Soares (Splendor Films España); Imelda Staunton – Pride as Hefina Headon (Golem)
Best Ensemble Cast: Pride – Ben Schnetzer, Monica Dolan, George MacKay, Bill Nighy, Andrew Scott, Imelda Staunton, Dominic West, Paddy Considine, Joseph Gilgun, Sophie Evans, Lisa Palfrey, Menna Trussler, Karina Fernandez, Liz White, Chris Overton, Jessica Gunning, Matthew Flynn, Jessie Cave and Freddie Fox (Golem)‡; The Club – Roberto Farías, Antonia Zegers, Alfredo Castro, Alejandro Goic, Alejandro Sieveking, Jaime Vadell and Marcelo Alonso (Caramel Films); Girl Gets Girl – Celia Freijeiro, Cristina Pons, Sandra Collantes, María Botto, María Ballesteros, Adrián Lastra, Ismael Martínez, Jaime Olias, Eulalia Ramón, Estefanía de los Santos, Sabrina Praga, Paulina Gálvez, Beatriz Montañez, Marina San José, Jane Badler, Karina Matas Piper, Alberto Velasco and Mar Ayala (Versus Entertainment)	Best Couple: Glória Pires and Miranda Otto – Reaching for the Moon as Lota de Macedo Soares and Elizabeth Bishop (Splendor Films España)‡; Romain Duris and Anaïs Demoustier – The New Girlfriend as David / Virginia and Claire (Golem); Ghilherme Lobo and Fábio Audi – The Way He Looks as Leonardo and Gabriel (Surtsey Films)
Best New Actor: Kostas Nikouli – Xenia as Dany (Karma Films)‡; Rubèn de Eguia – Virus of Fear as Jordi (Alfa Pictures); Del Herbert-Jane – 52 Tuesdays as James (Cine Binario)	Best New Actress: Tilda Cobham-Hervey – 52 Tuesdays as Billie (Cine Binario)‡; Yordanka Ariosa – The King of Havana as Magda (Filmax); Sheila Vand – A Girl Walks Home Alone at Night as The Girl (La Aventura Audiovisual)

=== 2016 ===
==== Production ====
Best Film: Carol (Vértigo Films)‡; The Duke of Burgundy (La Aventura Audiovisual); From Afar (Caramel Films); The Handmaiden (La Aventura Audiovisual); Paris 05:59: Théo & Hugo (Surtsey Films)
Best Director: Todd Haynes – Carol (Vértigo Films)‡; Park Chan-wook – The Handmaiden (La Aventura Audiovisual); Alantė Kavaitė – The Summer of Sangailė (Cine Binario)	Best New Director: Lorenzo Vigas – From Afar (Caramel Films)‡; Miguel del Arco – The Furies (Wanda Visión); Maysaloun Hamoud – In Between (Golem)
Best Original Screenplay: Peter Strickland – The Duke of Burgundy (La Aventura Audiovisual)‡; Olivier Ducastel and Jacques Martineau – Paris 05:59: Théo & Hugo (Surtsey Films); Céline Sciamma and André Téchiné – Being 17 (Vértigo Films)	Best Adapted Screenplay: Phyllis Nagy – Carol (Vértigo Films)‡; Lorenzo Vigas – From Afar (Caramel Films); Park Chan-wook and Jeong Seo-kyeong – The Handmaiden (La Aventura Audiovisual)
Best Cinematography: Edward Lachman – Carol (Vértigo Films)‡; Chung Chung-hoon – The Handmaiden (La Aventura Audiovisual); Dominique Colin – The Summer of Sangailė (Cine Binario)	Best Editing: Matyas Fekete – The Duke of Burgundy (La Aventura Audiovisual)‡; Kim Jae-bum and Kim Sang-bum – The Handmaiden (La Aventura Audiovisual); Stephen O'Connell – Viva (Betta Pictures)
Best Production Design: Ryu Seong-hui – The Handmaiden (La Aventura Audiovisual)‡; Ana Solares and Héctor Iruega – Eisenstein in Guanajuato (Betta Pictures); Eve Stewart and Michael Standish – The Danish Girl (Universal Pictures)	Best Sound: Nicolas Becker, Jonas Jocys and Julien Perez – The Summer of Sangailė (Cine Binario)‡; Rob Entwistle, Martin Pavey and Tapio Liukkonen – The Duke of Burgundy (La Aventura Audiovisual); Jung Gun and Kim Suk-won – The Handmaiden (La Aventura Audiovisual)
Best Costume Design: Paco Delgado – The Danish Girl (Universal Pictures)‡; Andrea Flesch – The Duke of Burgundy (La Aventura Audiovisual); Sandy Powell – Carol (Vértigo Films)	Best Hair and Make-Up: Jan Sewell – The Danish Girl (Universal Pictures)‡; Jerry DeCarlo and Patricia Regan – Carol (Vértigo Films); Elena López Carreón, Mari Paz Robles and Marjut Samulin – Eisenstein in Guanajuato (Betta Pictures)
Best Original Music: Carter Burwell – Carol (Vértigo Films)‡; Alexandre Desplat – The Danish Girl (Universal Pictures); Cat's Eyes – The Duke of Burgundy (La Aventura Audiovisual)	Best Song: "The sound of you coming (임이 오는 소리)" (Gain and Minseo) – The Handmaiden (La Aventura Audiovisual)‡; "Hands of Love" (Miley Cyrus) – Freeheld (Filmax); "Zindagi" (Anushka Manchanda) – Angry Indian Goddesses (Karma Films)

==== Acting ====
Best Actor: Burghart Klaußner – The People vs. Fritz Bauer as Fritz Bauer (Caramel Films)‡; Alfredo Castro – From Afar as Armando (Caramel Films); Tom Hardy – Legend as Ronnie and Reggie Kray (Tripictures)	Best Actress: Rooney Mara – Carol as Therese Belivet (Vértigo Films)‡; Cate Blanchett – Carol as Carol Aird (Vértigo Films); Alicia Vikander – The Danish Girl as Gerda Wegener (Universal Pictures)
Best Supporting Actor: Luis Alberto García – Viva as Mama (Betta Pictures)‡; Michael Shannon – Freeheld as Dane Wells (Filmax); Ronald Zehrfeld – The People vs. Fritz Bauer as Karl Angermann (Caramel Films)	Best Supporting Actress: Sandrine Kiberlain – Being 17 as Dr. Marianne Delille (Vértigo Films)‡; Noémie Lvovsky – Summertime as Monique (Golem); Daniela Nefussi – Don't Call Me Son as Aracy / Glória (Karma Films)
Best Ensemble Cast: The Furies – José Sacristán, Mercedes Sampietro, Bárbara Lennie, Carmen Machi, Emma Suárez, Alberto San Juan, Elisabet Gelabert, Gonzalo de Castro, Pere Arquillué and Macarena Sanz (Wanda Visión)‡; The Handmaiden – Ha Jung-woo, Kim Min-hee, Cho Jin-woong, Kim Tae-ri, Moon So-ri and Kim Hae-sook (La Aventura Audiovisual); The People vs. Fritz Bauer – Burghart Klaußner, Ronald Zehrfeld, Dani Levy, Sebastian Blomberg, Laura Tonke, Lilith Stangenberg, Michael Schenk, Matthias Weidenhöfer, Götz Schubert, Jörg Schüttauf, Cornelia Gröschel, Paulus Manker, Tilo Werner, Rüdiger Klink and Robert Atzorn (Caramel Films)	Best Couple: François Nambot and Geoffrey Couët – Paris 05:59: Théo & Hugo as Hugo and Theó (Surtsey Films)‡; Rooney Mara and Cate Blanchett – Carol as Therese Belivet and Carol Aird (Vértigo Films); Izïa Higelin and Cécile de France – Summertime as Delphine and Carol (Golem)
Best New Actor: Luis Silva – From Afar as Élder (Caramel Films)‡; Corentin Fila – Being 17 as Thomas Chardoul (Vértigo Films); Naomi Nero – Don't Call Me Son as Pierre / Felipe (Karma Films)	Best New Actress: Kim Tae-ri – The Handmaiden as Sook-hee (La Aventura Audiovisual)‡; Silvia Maya - Julia as Victoria (El Gato Verde); Julija Steponaityte – The Summer of Sangailė as Sangailė (Cine Binario)

=== 2017 ===
==== Production ====
Best Film: Moonlight (Diamond Films)‡; A Fantastic Woman (BTeam Pictures); God's Own Country (Karma Films); Rara (Syldavia Cinema); The Wound (Surtsey Films)
Best Director: Barry Jenkins – Moonlight (Diamond Films)‡; Amat Escalante – The Untamed (Noucinemart); Sebastián Lelio – A Fantastic Woman (BTeam Pictures)	Best New Director: Pepa San Martín – Rara (Syldavia Cinema)‡; Francis Lee – God's Own Country (Karma Films); John Trengove – The Wound (Surtsey Films)
Best Original Screenplay: Sebastián Lelio and Gonzalo Maza – A Fantastic Woman (BTeam Pictures)‡; Fernando Pérez and Abel Rodríguez – Last Days in Havana (Wanda Visión); Pepa San Martín and Alicia Scherson – Rara (Syldavia Cinema)	Best Adapted Screenplay: Barry Jenkins and Tarell Alvin McCraney – Moonlight (Diamond Films)‡; Javier Ambrossi and Javier Calvo – Holy Camp! (DeAPlaneta); Malusi Bengu, Thando Mgqolozana and John Trengove – The Wound (Surtsey Films)
Best Cinematography: James Laxton – Moonlight (Diamond Films)‡; Lasse Frank Johannessen – Tom of Finland (Festival Films); Joshua James Richards – God's Own Country (Karma Films)	Best Editing: Joi McMillon and Nat Sanders – Moonlight (Diamond Films)‡; Andrew Bird – Goodbye Berlin (Golem); Alexandra Strauss – I Am Not Your Negro (Karma Films)
Best Production Design: Christian Olander, Lotta Bergman, Ricardo Molina, Astrid Poeschke and Riina Sipiläinen – Tom of Finland (Festival Films)‡; Judy Becker and Alexander Wei – Battle of the Sexes (20th Century Fox); Riton Dupire-Clément and Martin Dupont-Domenjound – Slack Bay (VerCine)	Best Sound: Sergio Díaz, Vincent Arnardi and Raúl Locatelli – The Untamed (Noucinemart)‡; Jonas Jansson, Fredrik Dalenfjäll, Mattias Eklund and Mac Ruth – Atomic Blonde (DeAPlaneta); Kai Tebbel, Lars Ginzel Kai Lüde – Goodbye Berlin (Golem)
Best Costume Design: Mary Zophres – Battle of the Sexes (20th Century Fox)‡; Alexandra Charles – Slack Bay (VerCine); Anna Vilppunen – Tom of Finland (Festival Films)	Best Hair and Make-Up: Johanna Eliasson, Sandra Mundi, Riika Virtanen and Lars Carlsson – Tom of Finland (Festival Films)‡; Frédéric Balmer, Balthazar, Morgane Bernhard, Michèle Constantinides, Mathieu Gueracague, Alexis Kinebayan and Jana Schulze – Slack Bay (VerCine); Lola Gómez, Jesús Gil and Óscar del Monte – Skins (Premium Cinema)
Best Original Music: Nicholas Britell – Moonlight (Diamond Films)‡; Nicholas Britell – Battle of the Sexes (20th Century Fox); Matthew Herbert – A Fantastic Woman (BTeam Pictures)	Best Original Song: "La llamada" (Leiva) – Holy Camp! (DeAPlaneta)‡; "If I Dare" (Sara Bareilles) – Battle of the Sexes (20th Century Fox); "Nuestro momento" (Atacados) – Foam Party! (Begin Again Films)

==== Acting ====
Best Actor: Jorge Martínez – Last Days in Havana as Diego (Wanda Visión)‡; Josh O'Connor – God's Own Country as Johnny Saxby (Karma Films); Gaspard Ulliel – It's Only the End of the World as Louis (Premium Cinema)	Best Actress: Daniela Vega – A Fantastic Woman as Marina Vidal (BTeam Pictures)‡; Kiti Mánver – Wounded by the Wind as Juan (Versión Digital); Emma Stone – Battle of the Sexes as Billie Jean King (20th Century Fox)
Best Supporting Actor: Mahershala Ali – Moonlight as Juan (Diamond Films)‡; Ian Hart – God's Own Country as Martin Saxby (Karma Films); André Holland – Moonlight as Adult Kevin (Diamond Films)	Best Supporting Actress: Naomie Harris – Moonlight as Paula (Diamond Films)‡; Anna Castillo – Holy Camp! as Susana Romero (DeAPlaneta); Belén Cuesta – Holy Camp! as Milagros (DeAPlaneta)
Best Ensemble Cast: Holy Camp! – Macarena García, Anna Castillo, Belén Cuesta, Gracia Olayo, Richard Collins-Moore, María Isabel Díaz, Secun de la Rosa, Esti Quesada, Víctor Elías, Mar Corzo and Loli Pascua (DeAPlaneta)‡; Moonlight – Trevante Rhodes, Naomie Harris, Mahershala Ali, Ashton Sanders, André Holland, Alex Hibbert, Janelle Monáe, Jharrel Jerome, Shariff Earp, Duan Sanderson and Edson Jean (Diamond Films); Rara – Julia Lübbert, Emilia Ossandón, Mariana Loyola, Agustina Muñoz, Daniel Muñoz, Coca Guazzini, Sigrid Alegría and Micaela Cristi (Syldavia Cinema)	Best Couple: Alec Secăreanu and Josh O'Connor – God's Own Country as Gheorghe Ionescu and Johnny Saxby (Karma Films)‡; Jharrel Jerome and Ashton Sanders – Moonlight as Teen Kevin and Teen Chiron (Diamond Films); Natalia Tena and Oona Chaplin – Anchor and Hope as Kat and Eva (Avalon)
Best New Actor: Nakhane – The Wound as Xolani (Surtsey Films)‡; Trevante Rhodes – Moonlight as Adult Chiron / "Black" (Diamond Films); Alec Secăreanu – God's Own Country as Gheorghe Ionescu (Karma Films)	Best New Actress: Julia Lübbert – Rara as Sara (Syldavia Cinema)‡; Gabriela Ramos – Last Days in Havana as Yusisleydis (Wanda Visión); Raph – Slack Bay as Billie van Peteghem (VerCine)

=== 2018 ===
==== Production ====
Best Film: Call Me by Your Name (Sony Pictures)‡; BPM (Beats per Minute) (Avalon); Heartstone (Abordar); The Party (Avalon); Thelma (Surtsey Films)
Best Director: Luca Guadagnino – Call Me by Your Name (Sony Pictures)‡; Robin Campillo – BPM (Beats per Minute) (Avalon); Joachim Trier – Thelma (Surtsey Films)	Best New Director: Guðmundur Arnar Guðmundsson – Heartstone (Abordar)‡; Lukas Dhont – Girl (Vértigo Films); Adrián Silvestre – The Objects of Love (Adrián Silvestre)
Best Original Screenplay: Robin Campillo – BPM (Beats per Minute) (Avalon)‡; Brian Kehoe and Jim Kehoe – Blockers (Universal Pictures); Sally Potter and Walter Donohue – The Party (Avalon)	Best Adapted Screenplay: James Ivory – Call Me by Your Name (Sony Pictures)‡; Sebastián Lelio and Rebecca Lenkiewicz – Disobedience (Sony Pictures); Jessica Sharzer – A Simple Favor (eOne Films)
Best Cinematography: Sayombhu Mukdeeprom – Call Me by Your Name (Sony Pictures)‡; Benoît Debie – Climax (Avalon); Sturla Brandth Grøvlen – Heartstone (Abordar)	Best Editing: Robin Campillo – BPM (Beats per Minute) (Avalon)‡; Olivier Bugge Coutté – Thelma (Surtsey Films); Guille Gatti – El Angel (BTeam Pictures)
Best Production Design: Julia Freid – El Angel (BTeam Pictures)‡; Michael Carlin – Colette (DeAPlaneta); Samuel Deshors, Sandro Piccarozzi and Violante V. di Modrone – Call Me by Your Name (Sony Pictures)	Best Sound: Gisle Tveito – Thelma (Surtsey Films)‡; John Casali, Nina Hartstone, Andy Kennedy, Paul Massey and Jens Rosenlund Petersen – Bohemian Rhapsody (20th Century Fox); Ken Yasumoto – Climax (Avalon)
Best Costume Design: Renee Ehrlich Kalfus – A Simple Favor (eOne Films)‡; Andrea Flesch – Colette (DeAPlaneta); Giulia Piersanti – Call Me by Your Name (Sony Pictures)	Best Hair and Make-Up: Ivana Primorac – Colette (DeAPlaneta)‡; Cécile Pellerin, Virginie Duranteau, Arnaud Guelle and Alexis Kinebanyan – BPM (Beats per Minute) (Avalon); Jan Sewell – Bohemian Rhapsody (20th Century Fox)
Best Original Music: Matthew Herbert – Disobedience (Sony Pictures)‡; Thomas Adès – Colette (DeAPlaneta); Arnaud Rebotini – BPM (Beats per Minute) (Avalon)	Best Original Song: "Mystery of Love" (Sufjan Stevens) – Call Me by Your Name (Sony Pictures)‡; "Alfie's Song (Not So Typical Love Song)" (Bleachers) – Love, Simon (20th Century Fox); "Lo saben" (Lucas Vidal and Antonio Orozco) – The Best Day of My Life (Versus Entertainment)

==== Acting ====
Best Actor: Timothée Chalamet – Call Me by Your Name as Elio Perlman (Sony Pictures)‡; Nahuel Pérez Biscayart – BPM (Beats per Minute) as Sean Dalmazo (Avalon); Guillermo Pfening – Nobody's Watching as Nico (Versus Entertainment)	Best Actress: Eili Harboe – Thelma as Thelma (Surtsey Films)‡; Keira Knightley – Colette as Colette (DeAPlaneta); Rachel Weisz – Disobedience as Ronit Krushka (Sony Pictures)
Best Supporting Actor: Armie Hammer – Call Me by Your Name as Oliver (Sony Pictures)‡; Alessandro Nivola – Disobedience as Dovid Kuperman (Sony Pictures); Michael Stuhlbarg – Call Me by Your Name as Sam Perlman (Sony Pictures)	Best Supporting Actress: Patricia Clarkson – The Party as April (Avalon)‡; Blake Lively – A Simple Favor as Emily Nelson / Hope McLanden and Faith McLanden (eOne Films); Rachel McAdams – Disobedience as Esti Kuperman (Sony Pictures)
Best Ensemble Cast: BPM (Beats per Minute) – Nahuel Pérez Biscayart, Adèle Haenel, Yves Heck, Arnaud Valois, Emmanuel Ménard, Antoine Reinartz, François Rabette, Félix Maritaud, Catherine Vinatier, Médhi Touré, Aloïse Sauvage, Simon Bourgade, Saadia Ben Taieb, Théophile Ray, Ariel Borenstein, Simon Guélat, Jean-François Auguste, Samuel Churin, Pauline Guimard and Coralie Russier (Avalon)‡; Call Me by Your Name – Timothée Chalamet, Armie Hammer, Michael Stuhlbarg, Amira Casar, Esther Garrel, Victoire Du Bois, Elena Bucci, Marco Sgrosso, André Aciman and Peter Spears (Sony Pictures); The Party – Patricia Clarkson, Bruno Ganz, Cherry Jones, Emily Mortimer, Cillian Murphy, Kristin Scott Thomas and Timothy Spall (Avalon)	Best Couple: Blær Hinriksson and Baldur Einarsson – Heartstone as Christian and Thor (Abordar)‡; Armie Hammer and Timothée Chalamet – Call Me by Your Name as Oliver and Elio Perlman (Sony Pictures); Rosy Rodríguez and Zaira Romero – Carmen & Lola as Carmen and Lola (Super 8)
Best New Actor: Victor Polster – Girl as Lara (Vértigo Films)‡; Lorenzo Ferro – El Angel as Carlos Robledo Puch (BTeam Pictures); Tim Kalkhof – The Cakemaker as Thomas (Karma Films)	Best New Actress: Laura Rojas Godoy – The Objects of Love as Luz (Adrián Silvestre)‡; Nicole Costa – The Objects of Love as Fran (Adrián Silvestre); Katherine Langford – Love, Simon as Leah Burke (20th Century Fox)

=== 2019 ===
==== Production ====
Best Film: Portrait of a Lady on Fire (Karma Films)‡; The Favourite (20th Century Fox); The Heiresses (BTeam Pictures); Pain and Glory (Sony Pictures); Sauvage (Elamedia)
Best Director: Céline Sciamma – Portrait of a Lady on Fire (Karma Films)‡; Pedro Almodóvar – Pain and Glory (Sony Pictures); Yorgos Lanthimos – The Favourite (20th Century Fox)	Best New Director: Camille Vidal-Naquet – Sauvage (Elamedia)‡; Marcelo Martinessi – The Heiresses (BTeam Pictures); Olivia Wilde – Booksmart (eOne Films)
Best Original Screenplay: Deborah Davis and Tony McNamara – The Favourite (20th Century Fox)‡; Christophe Honoré – Sorry Angel (Surtsey Films); Céline Sciamma – Portrait of a Lady on Fire (Karma Films)	Best Adapted Screenplay: Desiree Akhavan and Cecilia Frugiuele – The Miseducation of Cameron Post (Good Films)‡; Joel Edgerton – Boy Erased (Universal Pictures); Nicole Holofcener and Jeff Whitty – Can You Ever Forgive Me? (20th Century Fox)
Best Cinematography: Claire Mathon – Portrait of a Lady on Fire (Karma Films)‡; Jóhann Máni Jóhannsson – Let Me Fall (La Aventura Audiovisual); Artur Tort – Liberté (Elamedia)	Best Editing: Úlfur Teitur Traustason – Let Me Fall (La Aventura Audiovisual)‡; Teresa Font – Pain and Glory (Sony Pictures); Yorgos Mavropsaridis – The Favourite (20th Century Fox)
Best Production Design: Antxón Gómez – Pain and Glory (Sony Pictures)‡; Fiona Crombie and Alice Felton – The Favourite (20th Century Fox); Thomas Grézaud – Portrait of a Lady on Fire (Karma Films)	Best Sound: Matthew Collinge, John Hayes, Mike Prestwood Smith and Danny Sheehan – Rocketman (Paramount Pictures)‡; Johnnie Burn – The Favourite (20th Century Fox); Jordi Ribas and Mélissa Petitjean – Liberté (Elamedia)
Best Costume Design: Sandy Powell – The Favourite (20th Century Fox)‡; Julian Day – Rocketman (Paramount Pictures); Paola Torres – Pain and Glory (Sony Pictures)	Best Hair and Make-Up: Nadia Stacey, Beverley Binda and Samantha Denyer – The Favourite (20th Century Fox)‡; Elizabeth Yianni-Georgiou, Tapio Salmi and Barrie Gower – Rocketman (Paramount Pictures); Gerd Zeiss – The Happy Prince (Alfa Pictures)
Best Original Music: Alberto Iglesias – Pain and Glory (Sony Pictures)‡; Sofía Oriana – Elisa & Marcela (Netflix); Claire M. Singer – Tell It to the Bees (Filmax)	Best Original Song: "Revelation" (Troye Sivan, Jon Thor Birgisson and Leland) – Boy Erased (Universal Pictures)‡; "(I'm Gonna) Love Me Again" (Taron Egerton, Elton John and Bernie Taupin) – Rocketman (Paramount Pictures); "Portrait de la jeune fille en feu" (Para One and Arthur Simonini) – Portrait of a Lady on Fire (Karma Films)

==== Acting ====
Best Actor: Antonio Banderas – Pain and Glory as Salvador Mallo (Sony Pictures)‡; Taron Egerton – Rocketman as Elton John (Paramount Pictures); Théodore Pellerin – Genesis as Guillaume / Charlotte's half-brother (Surtsey Films)	Best Actress: Olivia Colman – The Favourite as Queen Anne (20th Century Fox)‡; Emma Stone – The Favourite as Abigail (20th Century Fox); Rachel Weisz – The Favourite as Lady Sarah (20th Century Fox)
Best Supporting Actor: Richard E. Grant – Can You Ever Forgive Me? as Jack Hock (20th Century Fox)‡; Denis Podalydès – Sorry Angel as Matthieu (Surtsey Films); Leonardo Sbaraglia – Pain and Glory as Federico Delgado (Sony Pictures)	Best Supporting Actress: Penélope Cruz – Pain and Glory as Jacinta (Sony Pictures)‡; Nicole Kidman – Boy Erased as Nancy Eamons (Universal Pictures); Julieta Serrano – Pain and Glory as Jacinta (Sony Pictures)
Best Ensemble Cast: Booksmart – Kaitlyn Dever, Beanie Feldstein, Lisa Kudrow, Jason Sudeikis, Jessica Williams, Will Forte, Mike O'Brien, Molly Gordon, Billie Lourd, Skyler Gisondo, Noah Galvin, Diana Silvers, Mason Gooding, Victoria Ruesga, Austin Crute, Eduardo Franco and Nico Hiraga (eOne Films)‡; The Shiny Shrimps – Nicolas Gob, Alban Lenoir, Geoffrey Couët, Michaël Abiteboul, David Baïot, Romain Lancry, Thomas Croisière, Jonathan Louis, Romain Brau, Maïa Quesemand, Roland Menou, Pierre Samuel and Félix Martinez (Vértigo Films); Let Me Fall – Lára Jóhanna Jónsdóttir, Álfrún Laufeyjardóttir, Þorsteinn Bachmann, Gary Anthony Stennette, Elín Sif Halldórsdóttir, Sólveig Arnarsdóttir, Atli Oskar Fjalarsson, Sveinn Ólafur Gunnarsson, Jordi Rodríguez, Björn Stefánsson, Eyrún Björk Jakobsdóttir, Haraldur Ari Stefánsson, Kristín Þóra Haraldsdóttir, Sigurbjartur Atlason and Einar Gunn (La Aventura Audiovisual)	Best Couple: Vincent Lacoste and Pierre Deladonchamps – Sorry Angel as Arthur Prigent and Jacques Tondelli (Surtsey Films)‡; Juan Barberini and Ramón Pujol – End of the Century as Ocho and Javi (Filmin); Adèle Haenel and Noémie Merlant – Portrait of a Lady on Fire as Héloïse and Marianne (Karma Films)
Best New Actor: Félix Maritaud – Sauvage as Léo (Elamedia)‡; Oleg Ivenko – The White Crow as Rudolf Nureyev (DeAPlaneta); Xabiani Ponce de León – This Is Not Berlin as Carlos (Syldavia Cinema)	Best New Actress: Ana Brun – The Heiresses as Chela (BTeam Pictures)‡; Billie Lourd – Booksmart as Gigi (eOne Films); Hari Nef – Assassination Nation as Bex Warren (Versus Entertainment)

=== 2020 ===
==== Production ====
Best Film: Matthias & Maxime (Avalon)‡; And Then We Danced (Avalon); Ema (BTeam Pictures); Kajillionaire (Universal Pictures); Summer of 85 (Golem)
Best Director: Miranda July – Kajillionaire (Universal Pictures)‡; Xavier Dolan – Matthias & Maxime (Avalon); François Ozon – Summer of 85 (Golem)	Best New Director: Romina Paula – Again Once Again (Begin Again Films)‡; Rose Glass – Saint Maud (Sony Pictures); Melina León – Song Without a Name (Begin Again Films)
Best Original Screenplay: Jayro Bustamante – Tremors (Atera)‡; Mateo Bendesky – Family Members (Barton); Miranda July – Kajillionaire (Universal Pictures)	Best Adapted Screenplay: François Ozon – Summer of 85 (Golem)‡; Josh Boone and Knate Lee – The New Mutants (Disney); Kepa Errasti and Mireia Gabilondo – The Hive (Barton)
Best Cinematography: Inti Briones – Song Without a Name (Begin Again Films)‡; Hichame Alaouié – Summer of 85 (Golem); Jasper Wolf – Monos (BTeam Pictures)	Best Editing: Sebastián Sepúlveda – Ema (BTeam Pictures)‡; Levan Akin and Simon Carlgren – And Then We Danced (Avalon); Ted Guard, Yorgos Mavropsaridis and Santiago Otheguy – Monos (BTeam Pictures)
Best Production Design: Estefanía Larraín and Tatiana Maulen – Ema (BTeam Pictures)‡; Benoît Barouh and Frédéric Delrue – Summer of 85 (Golem); Colombe Raby, Claude Tremblay and Pascale Deschênes – Matthias & Maxime (Avalon)	Best Sound: Lena Esquenazi, Eduardo Castillo, Javier Farina and Javier Umpierrez – Monos (BTeam Pictures)‡; Sylvain Brassard, Jean-Philippe Savard and Guy Pelletier – Matthias & Maxime (Avalon); Paul Davies, Simon Farmer and Andrew Stirk – Saint Maud (Sony Pictures)
Best Costume Design: Pascaline Chavanne – Summer of 85 (Golem)‡; Felipe Criado and Muriel Parra – Ema (BTeam Pictures); Ana López Cobos – So My Grandma's a Lesbian! (Filmax)	Best Hair and Make-Up: Kazu Hiro, Anne Morgan and Vivian Baker – Bombshell (eOne Films)‡; Jacquetta Levon – Saint Maud (Sony Pictures); Andrés Ramírez and Alex Rojas – Monos (BTeam Pictures)
Best Original Music: Emile Mosseri – Kajillionaire (Universal Pictures)‡; Mica Levi – Monos (BTeam Pictures); Pauchi Sasaki – Song Without a Name (Begin Again Films)	Best Original Song: "Real" (E$tado Unido and Stéphanie Janaina) – Ema (BTeam Pictures)‡; "Che vita meravigliosa" (Diodato) – The Goddess of Fortune (Karma Films); "Destino" (E$tado Unido) – Ema (BTeam Pictures)

==== Acting ====
Best Actor: Lance Henriksen – Falling as Willis Peterson (Caramel Films)‡; Xavier Dolan – Matthias & Maxime as Maxime (Avalon); Viggo Mortensen – Falling as John Peterson (Caramel Films)	Best Actress: Jasmine Trinca – The Goddess of Fortune as Annamaria Muscarà (Karma Films)‡; Morfydd Clark – Saint Maud as Katie / Maud (Sony Pictures); Romina Paula – Again Once Again as Romina (Begin Again Films)
Best Supporting Actor: Alfredo Castro – The Prince as El Potro (Barton)‡; Gael García Bernal – Ema as Gastón (BTeam Pictures); Benjamin Voisin – Summer of 85 as David Gorman (Golem)	Best Supporting Actress: Jennifer Ehle – Saint Maud as Amanda Köhl (Sony Pictures)‡; Valeria Bruni Tedeschi – Summer of 85 as David's mother (Golem); Laura Linney – Falling as Sarah Peterson (Caramel Films)
Best Ensemble Cast: Matthias & Maxime – Xavier Dolan, Gabriel D'Almeida Freitas, Anne Dorval, Catherine Brunet, Pier-Luc Funk, Harris Dickinson, Antoine Pilon, Marilyn Castonguay, Micheline Bernard, Adib Alkhalidey, Samuel Gauthier, Camille Felton, Anne-Marie Cadieux, Jacques Lavallée, Louise Bombardier, Monique Spaziani and Louis-Julien Durso (Avalon)‡; Bombshell – Charlize Theron, Margot Robbie, Nicole Kidman, John Lithgow, Allison Janney, Kate McKinnon, Malcolm McDowell, Mark Duplass, Alice Eve, Connie Britton, Alanna Ubach, Elisabeth Röhm, Madeline Zima, Brigette Lundy-Paine, Liv Hewson, London Fuller, Ashley Greene, Nazanin Boniadi and Stephen Root (eOne Films); Kajillionaire – Evan Rachel Wood, Richard Jenkins, Debra Winger, Gina Rodriguez, Da'Vine Joy Randolph, Diana-Maria Riva, Susan Berger, Mark Ivanir, Rachel Redleaf, Betsy Baker, Patricia Belcher, Kim Estes, Randy Ryan, Blanca Araceli, Michelle Gillette, Adam Bartley, Michael Twaine, Andrew Hawkes, David Ury, Matthew Downs, Samantha Cardona and Zachary Barton (Universal Pictures)	Best Couple: Gina Rodriguez and Evan Rachel Wood – Kajillionaire as Melanie Whitacre and Old Dolio Dyne (Universal Pictures)‡; David Moragas and Jacob Perkins – A Stormy Night as Marcos and Alan (Filmin); Benjamin Voisin and Félix Lefebvre – Summer of 85 as David Gorman and Alexis Robin (Golem)
Best New Actor: Levan Gelbakhiani – And Then We Danced as Merab (Avalon)‡; Félix Lefebvre – Summer of 85 as Alexis Robin (Golem); Tom Mercier – Synonyms as Yoav (La Aventura Audiovisual and Good Films)	Best New Actress: Mariana di Girolamo – Ema as Ema (BTeam Pictures)‡; Diane Bathen – Tremors as Isa (Atera); Pamela Mendoza – Song Without a Name as Georgina (Begin Again Films)

=== 2021 ===
==== Production ====
Best Film: The Power of the Dog (Netflix) ‡; Beware of Children (Filmin); Days (Vitrine); Little Girl (Good Films and La Aventura Audiovisual); Sediments (Begin Again Films); Shiva Baby (Filmin); Suk Suk (Vitrine); Two of Us (Karma Films); Welcome to Chechnya (Flamingo Films); Wheel of Fortune and Fantasy (Caramel Films)	Best Spanish Film: Sediments (Begin Again Films) ‡; Cut! (Filmin); Mía & Moi (Toned Media); More the Merrier (Filmax); Revolution Dancing (Begin Again Films)
Best Comedy: Shiva Baby (Filmin) ‡; Cut! (Filmin); Dating Amber (Elamedia); Everybody's Talking About Jamie (Amazon Prime Video); More the Merrier (Filmax)	Best Documentary: Little Girl (Good Films and La Aventura Audiovisual) ‡; House of Cardin (Filmin); Sediments (Begin Again Films); The Velvet Underground (Apple TV+); Welcome to Chechnya (Flamingo Films)
Best Director: Jane Campion – The Power of the Dog (Netflix) ‡; Sébastien Lifshitz – Little Girl (Good Films and La Aventura Audiovisual); Tsai Ming-liang – Days (Vitrine); Clarisa Navas – One in a Thousand (Barton)	Best New Director: Filippo Meneghetti – Two of Us (Karma Films) ‡; Cássio Pereira dos Santos – Valentina (Movistar+); Nicol Ruiz Benavides – Forgotten Roads (Amazon Prime Video); Emma Seligman – Shiva Baby (Filmin)
Best Original Screenplay: Dag Johan Haugerud – Beware of Children (Filmin) ‡; Ryusuke Hamaguchi – Wheel of Fortune and Fantasy (Caramel Films); Laurent Micheli – Lola (Elamedia); Ray Yeung – Suk Suk as Hoi and Pak (Vitrine)	Best Adapted Screenplay: Emma Seligman – Shiva Baby (Filmin) ‡; Jane Campion – The Power of the Dog (Netflix); Gilles Marchand and Dominik Moll – Only the Animals (Festival Films); Nami Sakkawa – Ride or Die (Netflix)
Best Cinematography: Ari Wegner – The Power of the Dog (Netflix) ‡; Tadashi Kuwabara – Ride or Die (Netflix); Piotr Sobocinski Jr. – Operation Hyacinth (Netflix); Aurélien Marra – Two of Us (Karma Films)	Best Editing: Hanna Park – Shiva Baby (Filmin) ‡; Mark Eckersley – I Care a Lot (Vértice); Agnieszka Glinska – Operation Hyacinth (Netflix); Peter Sciberras – The Power of the Dog (Netflix)
Best Production Design: Catharina Nyqvist Ehrnrooth – Tove (Filmin) ‡; Milan Býcek – Charlatan (Vercine); Grant Major and Amber Richards – The Power of the Dog (Netflix); Daniela Schneider – Dance of the 41 (Netflix)	Best Sound: Bartlomiej Bogacki and Michal Fojcik – Operation Hyacinth (Netflix) ‡; Yolande Decarsin and Kristian Eidnes Andersen – Little Girl (Good Films and La Aventura Audiovisual); Robert Mackenzie, Richard Flynn, Leah Katz, Tara Webb and Dave Whitehead – The Power of the Dog (Netflix); Tiago Raposinho, Branko Neskov, Joana Niza Braga and Nuno Bento – Variações (Filmin)
Best Costume Design: Kika Lopes – Dance of the 41 (Netflix) ‡; Paolo Nieddu – The United States vs. Billie Holiday (eOne Films); Michael O'Connor – Ammonite (Sony Pictures); Guy Speranza – Everybody's Talking About Jamie (Amazon Prime Video)	Best Hair and Make-Up: Flore Masson, Olivier Afonso and Antoine Mancini – Titane (Caramel Films) ‡; Eli Adánez, Sergio Pérez Berbel and Nacho Díaz – Libertad (Movistar+); Ivana Primorac – Ammonite (Sony Pictures); Ronald J. Wolfe, Charles Gregory Ross and Laini Thompson – The United States vs. Billie Holiday (eOne Films)
Best Original Music: Jonny Greenwood – The Power of the Dog (Netflix) ‡; Anne Dudley – Benedetta (Avalon); Alberto Iglesias – Parallel Mothers (Sony Pictures); Ariel Marx – Shiva Baby (Filmin)	Best Original Song: "This Was Me" (Dan Gillespie Sells and Tom MacRae) – Everybody's Talking About Jamie (Amazon Prime Video) ‡; "Por España" (Adrià Arbona) – Cut! (Filmin); "Refugio" (Luis Navarrete and Ramón Grau) – The Phantom of the Sauna (Sophia Network Productions); "Tigress & Tweed" (Andra Day and Raphael Saadiq) – The United States vs. Billie Holiday (eOne Films)

- Best Visual Effects: Ryan Laney, Eugen Bräunig, Maxwell Anderson, Johnny Han and Piers Dennis – Welcome to Chechnya (Flamingo Films) ‡

==== Acting ====
Best Actor: Benedict Cumberbatch – The Power of the Dog as Phil Burbank (Netflix) ‡; Tai Bo – Suk Suk as Pak (Vitrine); Sergio Práia – Variações as António Variações (Filmin); Steve Zahn – Cowboys as Troy (Filmin)	Best Actress: Kate Winslet – Ammonite as Mary Anning (Sony Pictures) ‡; Penélope Cruz – Parallel Mothers as Janis Martinez (Sony Pictures); Alma Pöysti – Tove as Tove Jansson (Filmin); Rosa Ramírez – Forgotten Roads as Claudina (Amazon Prime Video)
Best Supporting Actor: Kodi Smit-McPhee – The Power of the Dog as Peter Gordon (Netflix) ‡; Casey Affleck – The World to Come as Dyer (Sony Pictures); Eneko Sagardoy – Mía & Moi as Biel (Toned Media); Dimitri Stapfer – Beyto as Mike (Filmin)	Best Supporting Actress: Kirsten Dunst – The Power of the Dog as Rose Gordon (Netflix) ‡; Charlotte Rampling – Benedetta as The Abbess (Avalon); Aitana Sánchez-Gijón – Parallel Mothers as Teresa (Sony Pictures); Susan Sarandon – The Death & Life of John F. Donovan as Grace Donovan (Amazon Prime Video)
Best Ensemble Cast: Shiva Baby – Rachel Sennott, Dianna Agron, Polly Draper, Danny Deferrari, Fred Melamed and Molly Gordon (Filmin) ‡; Beware of Children – Henriette Steenstrup, Jan Gunnar Røise, Thorbjørn Harr, Brynjar Bandlien, Andrea Bræin Hovig, Hans Olav Brenner, Anne Marit Jacobsen, Ella Øverbye, Trine Wiggen and Adam Pålsson (Filmin); Dating Amber – Fionn O'Shea, Lola Petticrew, Sharon Horgan, Barry Ward, Simone Kirby, Evan O'Connor, Ian O'Reilly, Emma Willis, Anastasia Blake, Lauryn Canny, Shaun Dunne, Adam Carolan, Peter Campion, Ally Ni Chiarain, Tara Flynn, Arian Nik, Andrew Bennett, Karl Rice, Shauna Higgins, Dillon Potter Stapleton and Hannah O'Reilly (Elamedia); Wheel of Fortune and Fantasy – Kotone Furukawa, Ayumu Nakajima, Hyunri, Katsuki Mori, Shouma Kai, Kiyohiko Shibukawa, Fusako Urabe and Aoba Kawai (Caramel Films)	Best Couple: Ben Yuen and Tai Bo – Suk Suk as Hoi and Pak (Vitrine) ‡; Martine Chevallier and Barbara Sukowa – Two of Us as Madeleine Girard and Nina Dorn (Karma Films); Colin Firth and Stanley Tucci – Supernova as Sam and Tusker Mulliner (Wanda Visión); Fionn Whitehead and Leyna Bloom – Port Authority as Paul and Wye (Movistar+)
Best New Actor: Max Harwood – Everybody's Talking About Jamie as Jamie New / Mimi Me (Amazon Prime Video) ‡; Waseem Abbas – Baghdad in My Shadow as Muhammad (Surtsey Films); Jonathan P. Chambers – Single All the Way as Nick (Netflix); Conor Leach – Sequin in a Blue Room (Filmin)	Best New Actress: Mya Bollaers – Lola as Lola (Elamedia) ‡; Andra Day – The United States vs. Billie Holiday as Billie Holiday (eOne Films); Agathe Rousselle – Titane as Alexia / Adrien (Caramel Films); Rachel Sennott – Shiva Baby as Danielle (Filmin)
