= Tchinda Andrade =

Cape Verdean LGBT activist (1979–2024)

- Born: 1979; Mindelo, São Vicente, Cape Verde
- Died: 29 November 2024 (aged 45); Mindelo, São Vicente, Cape Verde
- Occupations: Activist, event manager

Tchinda Andrade (1979 – 29 November 2024) was a Cape Verdean LGBT activist and event manager. Andrade was the first trans woman in Cape Verde to come out publicly and quickly became a leading figure in the country's LGBT community, with the country's trans women coming to be known colloquially as "tchindas". Since her coming out, LGBT rights in Cape Verde have experienced notable progress, with the country becoming the most LGBT-friendly in Africa. Andrade has also become a leading organiser of the carnival on her island of São Vicente, which was the subject of the 2015 documentary Tchindas.

== Biography ==
Tchinda Andrade was born in a working-class neighbourhood of the city of Mindelo, on the island of São Vicente. She worked in one of the city's bars and sold coxinhas as street food. She began dressing in feminine clothing during the 1990s, but remained closeted for most of this time.

In 1998, Andrade became the first LGBT person to come out publicly in Cape Verde. That year, dressed in feminine clothing, she joined the women's section at the local carnival, which immediately drew attention towards her. She was interviewed by a journalist, who wrote an article about her titled "Tchinda-val!", making her a local celebrity overnight. This was at a time when, according to her, "all homosexuals [in Cape Verde] were in the closet."

Soon after coming out, Andrade was assaulted at a concert in Praia, leaving her scarred, with the singer Cesaria Evora paying for her medical bills. Andrade responded to the discrimination by preaching tolerance to the island's young people. Since then, Cape Verde has transformed into the most LGBT-friendly country in Africa. According to Catalan journalist Marc Serena, the small, close-knit community of São Vicente provided a fertile environment for the development of a more tolerant culture. Cape Verdean sociologist Claudia Rodrigues has additionally attributed the country's LGBT tolerance to its history of gender equality, which was established through the feminist policies of the anti-colonial leader Amílcar Cabral. Although the country has become more tolerant, Andrade herself has noted that there have continued to be problems with discrimination, which she said has made it difficult for her to have lasting relationships. She noted that discrimination is particularly visible in the country's capital city, as well as when people from other African countries visit the islands. Serena reports some Senegalese people kneeling in prayer upon seeing Andrade and other trans people in Cape Verde.

Andrade quickly became a leading figure within the country's LGBT community, gaining enough fame that Cape Verdean trans people are now colloquially referred to as "tchindas". Andrade herself attributed this to the fact that, before her coming out, Cape Verdean Creole had no words to describe LGBT people. She also recalled that her name being so widely used has caused her issues with mistaken identity. In 2011, Andrade and other transgender activists established the Cape Verdean Gay Association (AGC), which aimed to provide visibility for the country's LGBT community. In June 2013, the organisation held the country's first Pride week, the second on the African continent, during which it organised parades and a live music festival.

Before long Andrade began overseeing the island's local carnival, for which she put together floats and costumes, and coordinated the choreography. Cesaria Evora has praised it as the "best carnival in Africa." In 2013, Marc Serena and Pablo Garcia Perez de Lara made a film focusing on Andrade and other LGBT organisers of the Mindelo carnival. The film, titled Tchindas, premiered at Outfest in Los Angeles in 2015. At a screening of the film in New York City, Andrade remarked that she hoped the film would provide hope to LGBT people from other African countries and the rest of the world: "so they can see it's possible to be African and gay or trans and have people respect them."

On 29 November 2024, Andrade died from an illness at the Baptista de Sousa Hospital, in Mindelo. She was 45. Her death was announced by the National Human Rights Commission, which described her as a "pioneer for equality".

== Bibliography ==
- Linden, Sheri (15 July 2015). "'Tchindas': Outfest Review". Hollywood Reporter.
- Lusa (30 November 2024). "Morreu Tchinda Andrade, primeira mulher "abertamente declarada transgénero" em Cabo Verde" [Tchinda Andrade, the first ‘openly declared transgender’ woman in Cape Verde, has died]. Rádio e Televisão de Portugal (in Portuguese).
- Newell-Hanson, Alice (19 May 2016). "the trans queen of cape verde holds court in nyc". Vice News. Archived from the original on 27 June 2022.
- Page, Thomas (7 July 2016). "Tchinda Andrade: Cape Verde's transgender hero". CNN.
- Pina, Idalina (2021). "The Experience of One in the Many: LGBTQI+ History of Cape Verde". In Silva Lima-Neves, Terza A.; Fernandes Pilgrim, Aminah N. (eds.). Cabo Verdean Women Writing Remembrance, Resistance, and Revolution: Kriolas Poderozas. Lexington Books. pp. 167–176. ISBN 9781793634900.
- Rodriguez Martinez, Marta (8 April 2021). "How a small Cape Verde island became an LGTBI oasis in Africa". Euronews.
