= Samuel Ashley Brown =

American essayist (1923–2011)

Samuel Ashley Brown (December 19, 1923 – June 24, 2011 ) was a professor emeritus at the University of South Carolina who taught English and comparative literature. While he founded the literary magazine Shenandoah, his fame rests in great part on the fact that he was a confidant of two famous American women writers: the novelist Flannery O'Connor and the poet Elizabeth Bishop. Much was learned posthumously about both women when their respective correspondence with Brown was made public.

Brown was born and raised in Louisville. Ashley Brown attended Louisville Male High School and went on to complete a master's degree at Yale and a Ph.D. at Vanderbilt. It was while teaching at Washington and Lee University that he helped to found Shenandoah—a publication that featured the debut work of Tom Wolfe among others. He also taught at the University of Brazil and the University of California at Santa Barbara, before assuming the position at USC where he taught for 37 years. In 2007, his collected manuscripts and correspondence were purchased by Emory University.

Ashley Brown died from natural causes on June 24, 2011, after spending the last year of his life in Still Hopes Episcopal Retirement Community.
