= Michael Sledge =

American writer

- Born: March 15, 1972 (age 54); Houston, Texas, U.S.
- Occupation: Writer
- Writing career
- Genres: fiction, memoir
- Notable work: The More I Owe You

Michael Sledge (n. Houston, March 15, 1972) is an American writer. His 2010 debut novel The More I Owe You, about the relationship between Elizabeth Bishop and Lota de Macedo Soares, won the Ferro-Grumley Award in 2011 and was a shortlisted nominee for the Lambda Literary Award in the Lesbian Debut Fiction category at the 23rd Lambda Literary Awards.

Originally from Texas, Sledge previously published the memoir Mother and Son, about his relationship with his mother, who did not fully accept that he had come out as gay, in 1995. At the time, he worked primarily as a technical and science editor.

== Bibliography ==
- Mother and Son, New York: Simon & Schuster. 1995.
- The More I Owe You, Berkeley, CA: Counterpoint Press. 2010.
- Al Sur, Cronica del Valle Encantado, Mexico City: Editorial Turner. TBP 2022.
