= LGBTQ rights in Cape Verde =

- Cape Verde
- Legal status: Legal since 2004, with an equal age of consent
- Gender identity: No
- Military: No
- Discrimination protections: Yes, employment protections on the basis of sexual orientation since 2008

Family rights
- Recognition of relationships: No
- Adoption: No

Lesbian, gay, bisexual, transgender, and queer (LGBTQ) people in Cape Verde are afforded some legal protections, and Cape Verde is considered a gay tolerant country. Homosexual activity has been legal in Cape Verde since 2004. Additionally, since 2008, employment discrimination on the basis of sexual orientation has been banned, making Cape Verde one of the few African countries to have such protections for LGBTQ people.

Cape Verde, along with other former Portuguese colonies and South Africa, is one of the most LGBT-friendly African nations. The country's first LGBT event was held in June 2013 in the city of Mindelo. Due to its close relationship to Portugal and Brazil, Cape Verde has occasionally been described as the most tolerant nation in Africa with regard to LGBT people, though there are still reports of societal discrimination.

== Laws regarding same-sex sexual acts ==
In the 1886 Penal Code, Article 71 stated that unnatural acts were illegal. In 2004, Cape Verde amended its Penal Code to remove all provisions relating to consensual homosexual sex, thus becoming the second African country to decriminalize homosexuality after South Africa. At the time of decriminalization, the legal age of consent was 16 years old, the same age for consensual heterosexual acts. As of 2015, the age of consent in Cape Verde is 14.

== Recognition of same-sex relationships ==
Cape Verde does not recognize same-sex unions. On 11 July 2017, Prime Minister Ulisses Correia e Silva stated that the legalization of same-sex marriage was not on the agenda.

== Discrimination protections ==
Discrimination based on sexual orientation in the workplace has been banned by articles 45(2) and 406(3) of the Labour Code (Portuguese: Código Laboral) since 2008. The penalty is a fine with the specific monetary amount varying on a case-by-case basis. This makes Cape Verde one of the only African countries to have such protections for LGBT people, and the only one not in Southern Africa. Article 406(3) reads:

The penalty provided for in this article shall also apply to unlawful dismissal based on racial grounds, belonging to a particular ethnic group, religious motives, sexual orientation or any other discriminatory reason.

== Gender identity and expression ==
The most popular transgender person and activist in Cape Verde was Tchinda Andrade, who came out as transgender in a local newspaper in 1998. She has been described by CNN as the "mother hen" of the local transgender community, and transgender people in Cape Verde are often referred to as "tchindas" by locals. Tchindas, a 2015 documentary which follows Andrade's preparations for the São Vicente Carnival, won multiple awards including the Grand Jury Award at Outfest and was nominated for an Africa Movie Academy Award.

== Living conditions ==
In line with other former Portuguese African colonies, Cape Verde is reported to be one of the most tolerant countries in Africa towards gays and lesbians.

The U.S. Department of State's 2010 Human Rights Report found that "legal provisions helped provide protection for homosexual conduct; however, societal discrimination based on sexual orientation or gender identity continued to be a problem. There were no lesbian, gay, bisexual, or transgender persons' organizations active in the country."

By 2013, however, the Associação Gay de Cabo Verde (Cape Verdean Gay Association) had been established. The group organised the first pride parade in Cape Verde in June 2013, held in Mindelo, the second largest city in the country. Cape Verde became the second country in Africa to hold a gay pride parade after South Africa. Three years later, the first pride parade in the capital city of Praia took place.

Since then, other groups have begun working on LGBT rights, including the Associação LGBTI de Praia and the Associação Arco Iris, as well as the Cape Verdean Institute for Gender Equality and Equity (ICIEG). In 2018, the Praia Pride parade was organised with the help of the ICIEG and the Praia Government. Participants called for the legalisation of same-sex marriage and the enactment of anti-discrimination legislation.

São Vicente is known for being very welcoming to the LGBT community.

== United Nations ==
In 2008, Cape Verde was one of 66 countries that signed a United Nations General Assembly document stating that human rights are not limited based on sexual orientations or gender identities. In 2011, it signed a second document condemned violence and discrimination against LGBT people, joining 95 other countries, including 9 other African countries (South Africa, Gabon, Sierra Leone, the Central African Republic, the Seychelles, Mauritius, São Tomé and Príncipe, Guinea Bissau and Rwanda).

In 2025, during International LGBTQIA+ Pride Day, Cape Verde signed a joint declaration proposed by Spain in favor of LGBTQ rights, being the only African country to do so.

== Public opinion ==
A 2020 Afrobarometer opinion poll found that 80% of Cape Verdeans would welcome or would not be bothered by having a homosexual neighbour. Cape Verde was one of the only four countries in Africa polled with a majority in favour, alongside South Africa (70%), Mauritius (56%), and Namibia (54%).

== Summary table ==
Same-sex sexual activity legal	Yes (Since 2004)
Equal age of consent (14)	Yes (Since 2004)
Anti-discrimination laws in employment	Yes (Since 2008)
Anti-discrimination laws in housing	Yes (Since 2019)
Anti-discrimination laws in the provision of goods and services	Yes (Since 2019)
Anti-discrimination laws in all other areas (incl. indirect discrimination, hate speech)	Yes (Since 2019)
Hate crime laws include sexual orientation and gender identity	Yes (Since 2015)
Same-sex marriage	No
Recognition of same-sex couples	No
Stepchild adoption by same-sex couples	No
Joint adoption by same-sex couples	No
LGBT people allowed to serve openly in the military	No
Right to change legal gender	No
Access to IVF for lesbians	No
Commercial surrogacy for gay male couples	No
MSMs allowed to donate blood	No

== See also ==
- Human rights in Cape Verde
- LGBTQ rights in Africa
