= Elizabeth Bishop =

American poet and short-story writer (1911–1979)

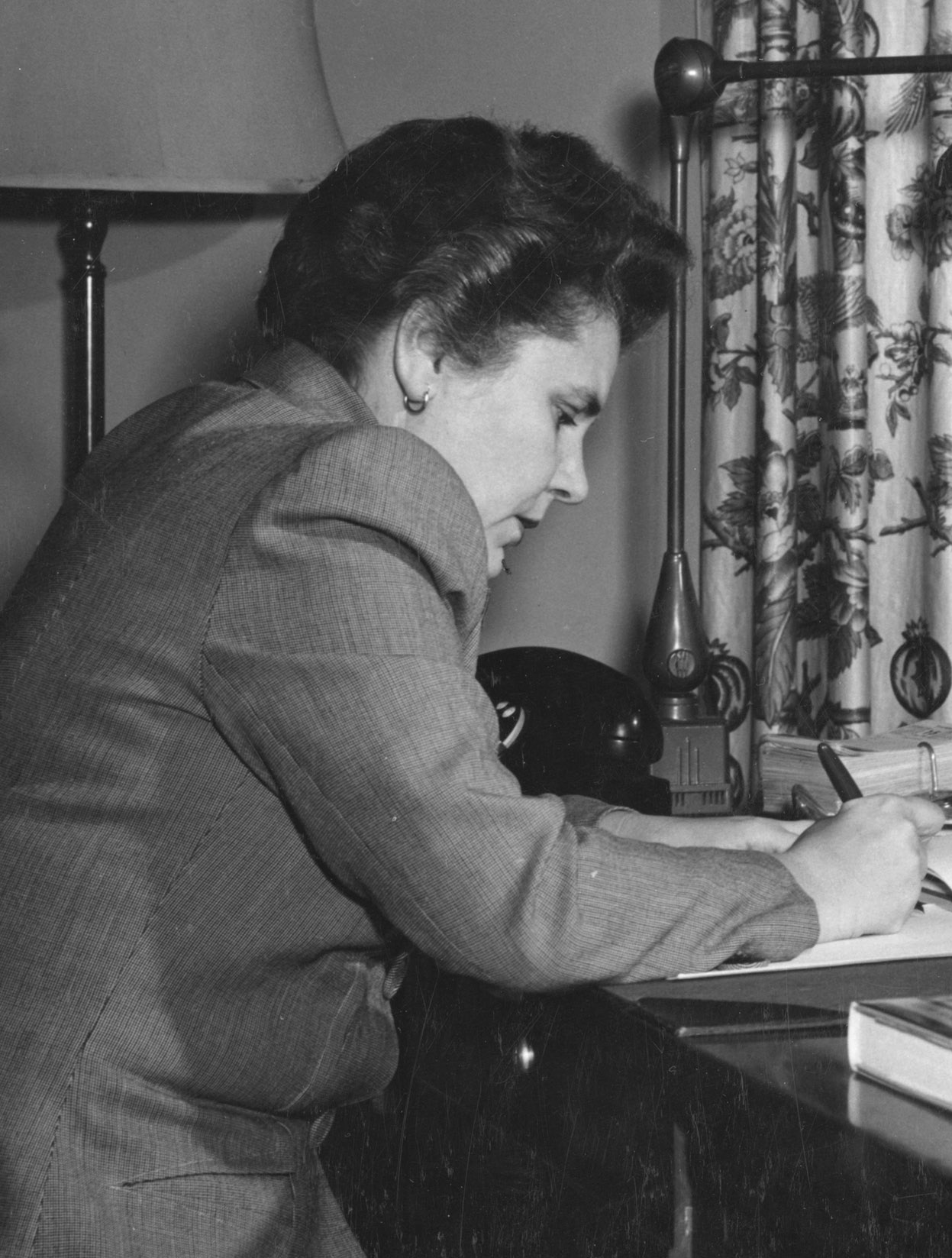
- Bishop writing in her office, c. 1949 – c. 1950
- Born: February 8, 1911; Worcester, Massachusetts, U.S.
- Died: October 6, 1979 (aged 68); Boston, Massachusetts, U.S.
- Education: Vassar College (AB)
- Occupation: Poet
- Partner(s): Lota de Macedo Soares (1952–1967); Alice Methfessel (1971–1979)
- Writing career
- Notable awards: Pulitzer Prize for Poetry (1956); National Book Award for Poetry (1970); National Book Critics Circle Award for Poetry (1976); Neustadt International Prize for Literature (1976)

Elizabeth Bishop (February 8, 1911 – October 6, 1979) was an American poet and short-story writer. She was Consultant in Poetry to the Library of Congress from 1949 to 1950, the Pulitzer Prize winner for Poetry in 1956, the National Book Award winner in 1970, and the recipient of the Neustadt International Prize for Literature in 1976. Dwight Garner argued in 2018 that she was perhaps "the most purely gifted poet of the 20th century." She was also a painter, and her poetry is noted for its careful attention to detail; Ernest Hilbert wrote “Bishop’s poetics is one distinguished by tranquil observation, craft-like accuracy, care for the small things of the world, a miniaturist’s discretion and attention."

== Early life ==
Bishop was an only child, born in Worcester, Massachusetts, to William Thomas and Gertrude May (Bulmer) Bishop on February 8, 1911. After her father, a successful builder, died when she was eight months old, Bishop's mother became mentally ill and was institutionalized in 1916. (Bishop would later write about the time of her mother's struggles in her short story "In the Village.") Effectively orphaned during early childhood, she lived with her maternal grandparents on a farm in Great Village, Nova Scotia, a period she referred to in her writing. Bishop's mother remained in an asylum until her death in 1934, and the two were never reunited.

Later in childhood, Bishop's paternal family gained custody. She was removed from the care of her maternal grandparents and moved in with her father's wealthier family in Worcester, Massachusetts. However, Bishop was unhappy there; her separation from her maternal grandparents made her lonely.

While she was living in Worcester, she developed chronic asthma, from which she suffered for the rest of her life. Her time in Worcester is briefly chronicled in her poem "In the Waiting Room". In 1918, her paternal grandparents, realizing that Bishop was unhappy living with them, sent her to live with her mother's eldest sister, Maude Bulmer Shepherdson, and her husband, George.

The Bishops paid Maude to house and educate their granddaughter. The Shepherdsons lived in a tenement in an impoverished Revere, Massachusetts, neighborhood populated mostly by Irish and Italian immigrants. The family later moved to better circumstances in Cliftondale, Massachusetts. It was Bishop's aunt who introduced her to the works of Victorian writers, including Alfred, Lord Tennyson, Thomas Carlyle, Robert Browning, and Elizabeth Barrett Browning.

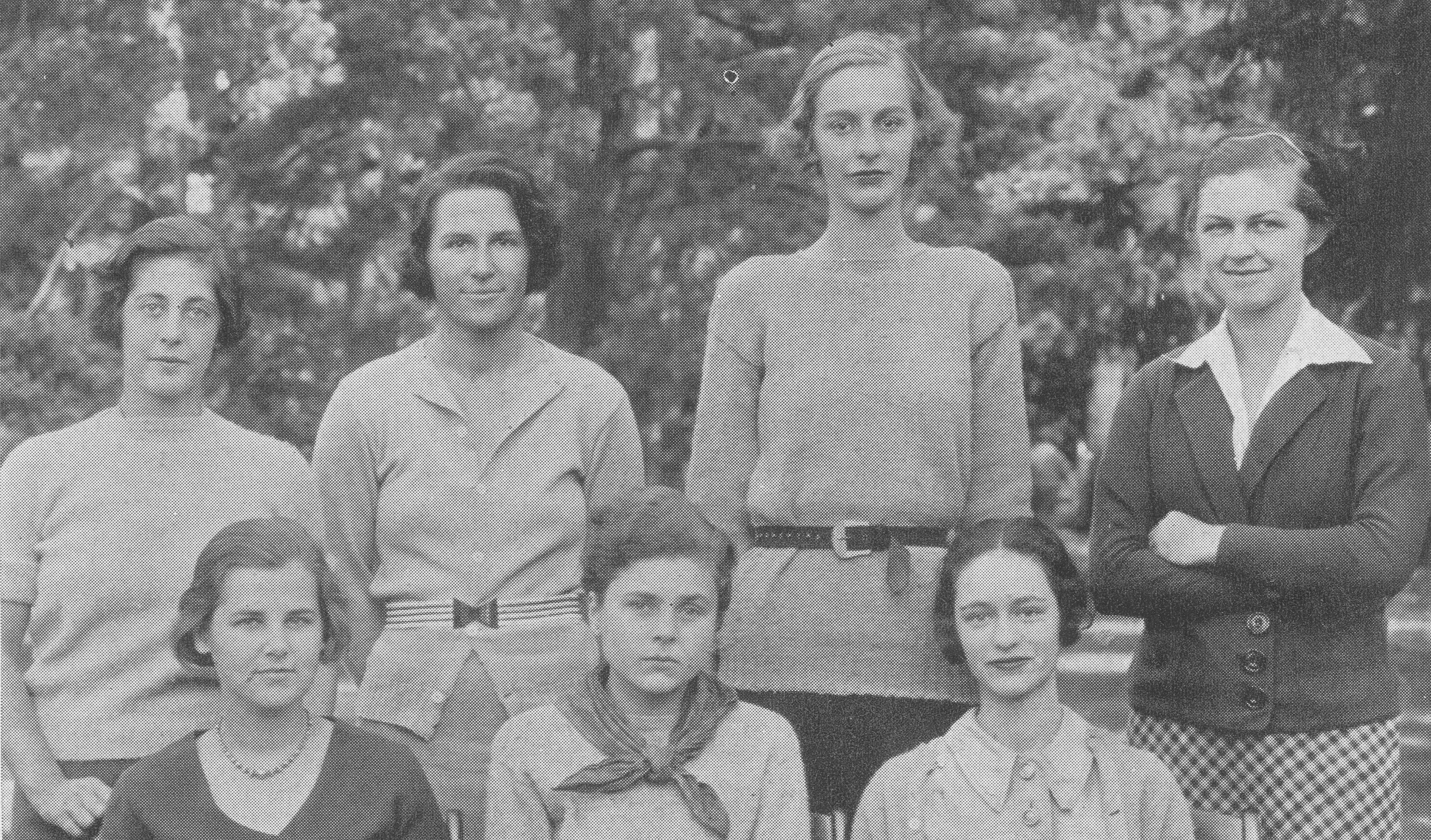
Bishop (bottom center) in 1934 with other members of Vassar's yearbook, the Vassarion, of which she was editor-in-chief

Bishop was very ill as a child and, as a result, received very little formal schooling until she attended Saugus High School for her freshman year. She was accepted to the Walnut Hill School in Natick, Massachusetts, for her sophomore year, but was behind on her vaccinations and not allowed to attend. Instead she spent the year at the Shore Country Day School in Beverly, Massachusetts. Bishop then boarded at the Walnut Hill School her junior and senior years, where she studied music.

At Shore Country Day, her first poems were published in a student magazine by her friend Frani Blough.

Bishop entered Vassar College in Poughkeepsie, New York, in the fall of 1929, planning to study music in order to become a composer. She gave up music because of her terror of performing, and switched her major to English, taking courses in 16th- and 17th-century literature. Bishop published her work in her senior year in The Magazine, a California publication.

In 1933, she co-founded Con Spirito, a rebel literary magazine at Vassar, with writer Mary McCarthy, Margaret Miller, and the sisters Eunice and Eleanor Clark. Bishop graduated from Vassar with a bachelor's degree in 1934.

== Influences ==
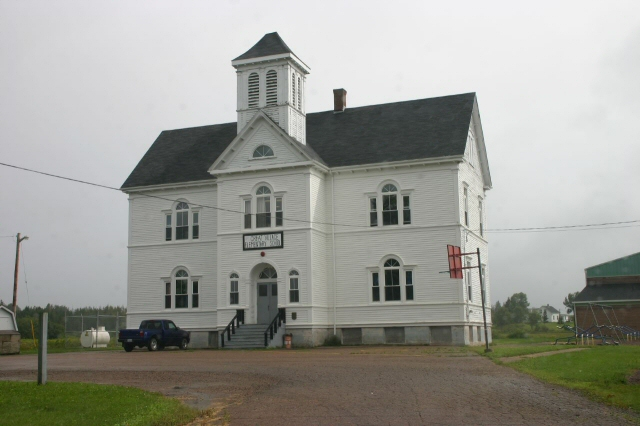
Elementary school in Great Village, Nova Scotia, where Bishop first attended school

Bishop was greatly influenced by the poet Marianne Moore, to whom she was introduced by a librarian at Vassar in 1934. Moore took a keen interest in Bishop's work and, at one point, Moore dissuaded Bishop from attending Cornell Medical School, where Bishop had briefly enrolled after moving to New York City following her Vassar graduation. Regarding Moore's influence on Bishop's writing, Bishop's friend and Vassar peer, the writer Mary McCarthy stated, "Certainly between Bishop and Marianne Moore there are resemblances: the sort of close microscopic inspection of certain parts of experience. [However,] I think there is something a bit too demure about Marianne Moore, and there's nothing demure about Elizabeth Bishop." Moore helped Bishop first publish some of her poems in an anthology called Trial Balances in which established poets introduced the work of unknown, younger poets.

It was four years before Bishop addressed "Dear Miss Moore" as "Dear Marianne" and only then at the elder poet's invitation. The friendship between the two women, memorialized by an extensive correspondence, endured until Moore's death in 1972. Bishop's "At the Fishhouses" (1955) contains allusions on several levels to Moore's 1924 poem "A Grave."

She was introduced to Robert Lowell by Randall Jarrell in 1947, and they became great friends, mostly through their written correspondence, until Lowell's death in 1977. After his death, she wrote, "our friendship, [which was] often kept alive through years of separation only by letters, remained constant and affectionate, and I shall always be deeply grateful for it." They also influenced each other's poetry. Lowell cited Bishop's influence on his poem "Skunk Hour" which he said, "[was] modeled on Miss Bishop's 'The Armadillo.'" Also, his poem "The Scream" is "derived from ... Bishop's story 'In the Village.'" "North Haven," one of the last of her poems published during her lifetime, was written in memory of Lowell in 1978.

Another figure Bishop often mentioned as integral to her ideals of mystery and accuracy was French poet and art critic, Charles Baudelaire. In fact, Samuel Ashley Brown "...noted that Bishop kept a photograph of Baudelaire near her writing desk." In terms of writing, Baudelaire provided Elizabeth Bishop the concept of urban experiences within life; "its assaults on the senses, its confusion of the real and unreal."

In 1924, Bishop encountered English poet Gerard Manley Hopkins upon reading his work in Harriet Monroe’s Anthology of Modern Poets. This interest would continue throughout her college years at Vassar College leading up to her original essay, "Notes on Timing in the Poetry of Gerard Manley Hopkins," which appeared in the Vassar Review in February 1934.

While Hopkins’ striking metaphors and clear descriptions of nature appealed to her, it was “...his ‘timing’ and his auditory invention that had the most lasting influence on Bishop's work.” For example, her appreciation for Hopkins’ love of alliteration and hyphenation can be seen in Song for the Rainy Season. Through her works, such as her final poem titled Sonnet, it is believed that a tribute to Hopkins himself is made, and with it “...the memory of his dynamic intensity” remains.

== Travels ==
Bishop had an independent income from early adulthood, as a result of an inheritance from her deceased father, that did not run out until near the end of her life. This income allowed her to travel widely, though cheaply, without worrying about employment, and to live in many cities and countries, which are described in her poems. She wrote frequently about her love of travel in poems like "Questions of Travel" and "Over 2000 Illustrations and a Complete Concordance." She lived in France for several years in the mid-1930s with a friend from Vassar, Louise Crane, who was a paper-manufacturing heiress.

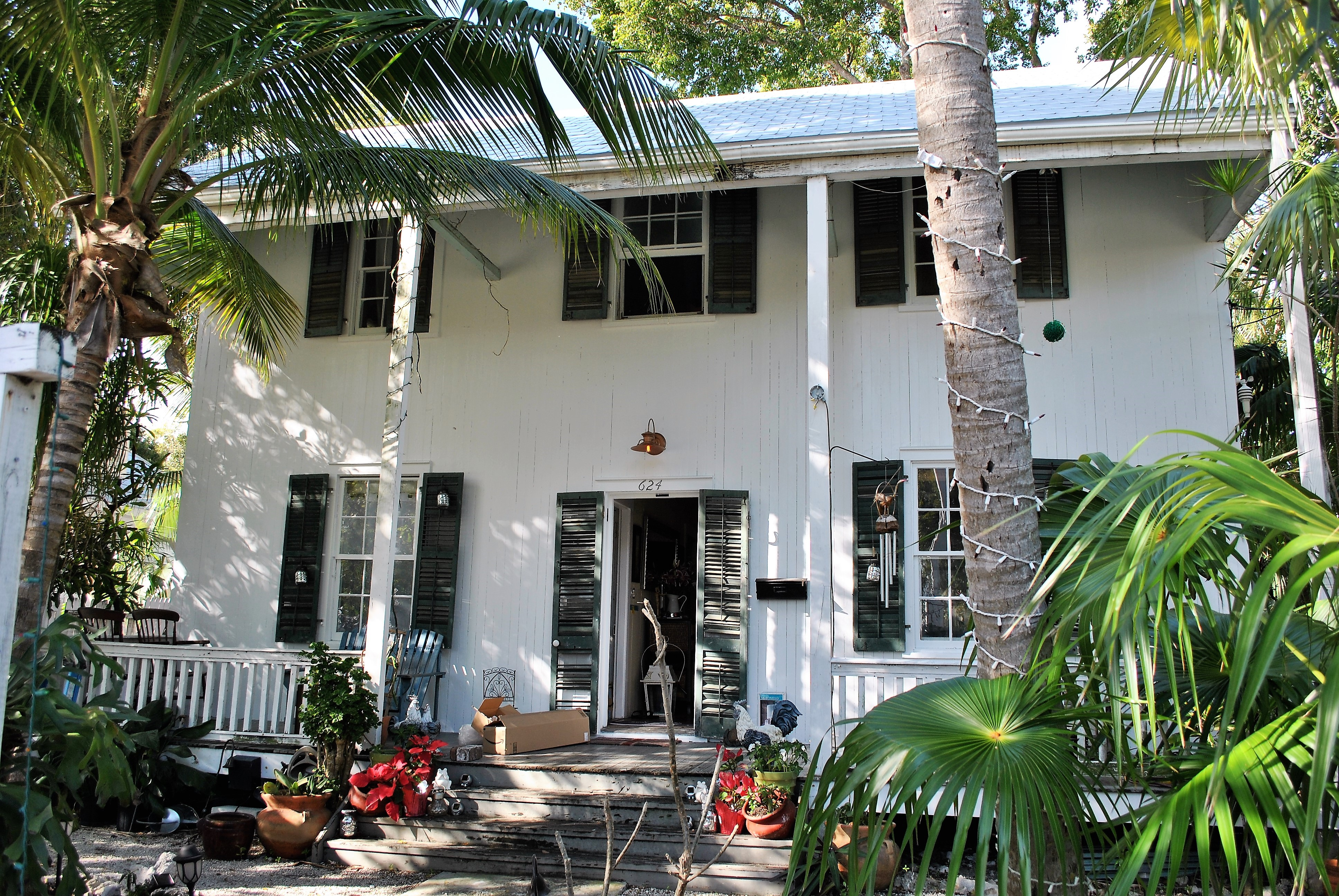
Elizabeth Bishop House, Key West, Florida

In 1938, the two of them purchased a house at 624 White Street in Key West, Florida. While living there Bishop made the acquaintance of Pauline Pfeiffer Hemingway, who had divorced Ernest Hemingway in 1940.

She later lived in an apartment at 611 Frances Street.

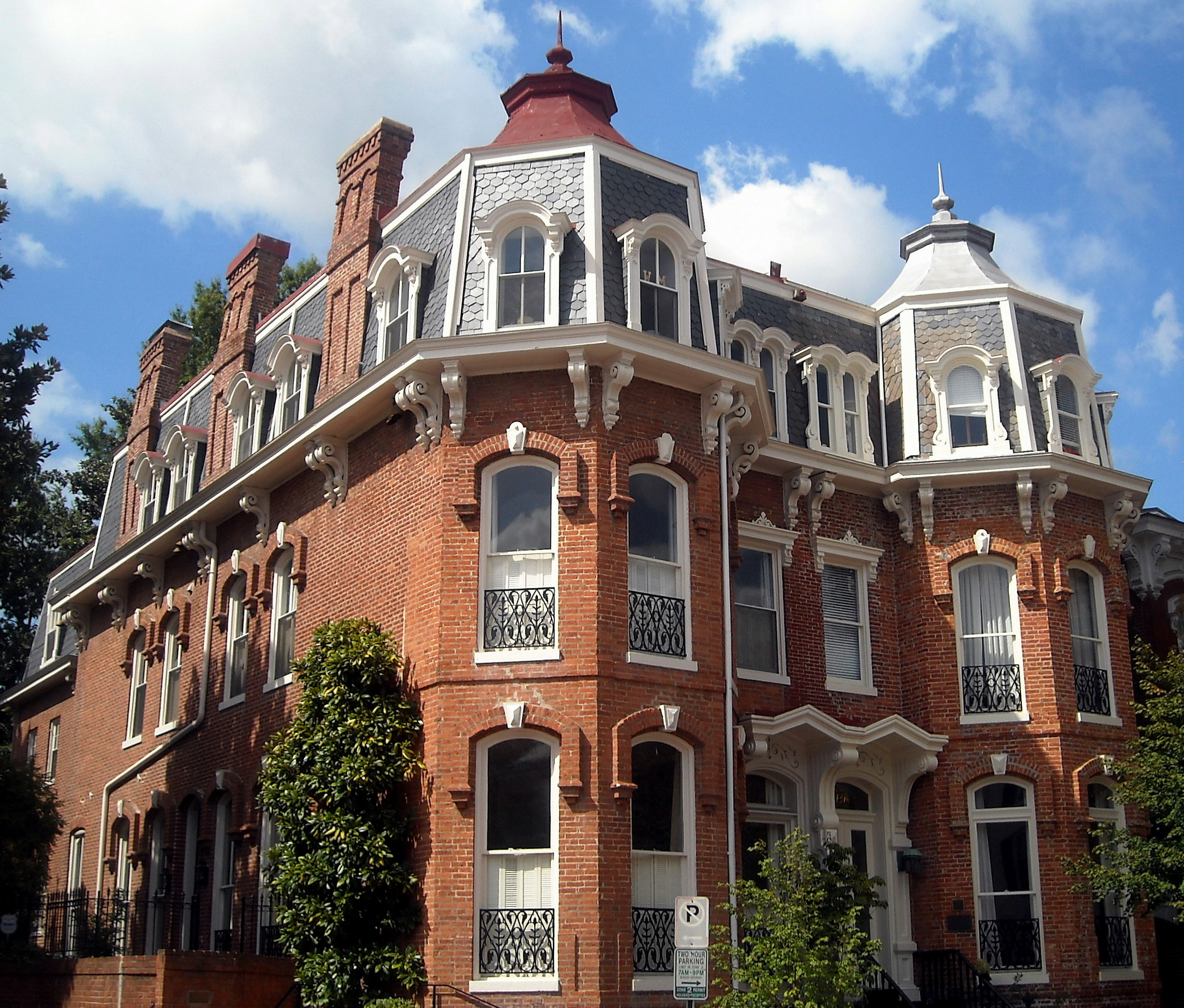
1312 & 1314 30th Street NW, (built 1868)

From 1949 to 1950, she was the Consultant in Poetry for the Library of Congress, and lived at Bertha Looker's Boardinghouse, 1312 30th Street Northwest, Washington, D.C., in Georgetown.

Upon receiving a substantial ($2,500) traveling fellowship from Bryn Mawr College in 1951, Bishop set off to circumnavigate South America. Arriving in Santos, Brazil, in November of that year, Bishop expected to stay two weeks but stayed 15 years. She lived in Petrópolis with architect Lota (Maria Carlota) de Macedo Soares, who was descended from a prominent and notable political family. Although Bishop was not forthcoming about details of her romance with Soares, much of their relationship was documented in Bishop's extensive correspondence with Samuel Ashley Brown. In its later years the relationship deteriorated, becoming volatile and tempestuous, marked by bouts of depression, tantrums, and alcoholism. The relationship is depicted in the 2013 film Reaching for the Moon.

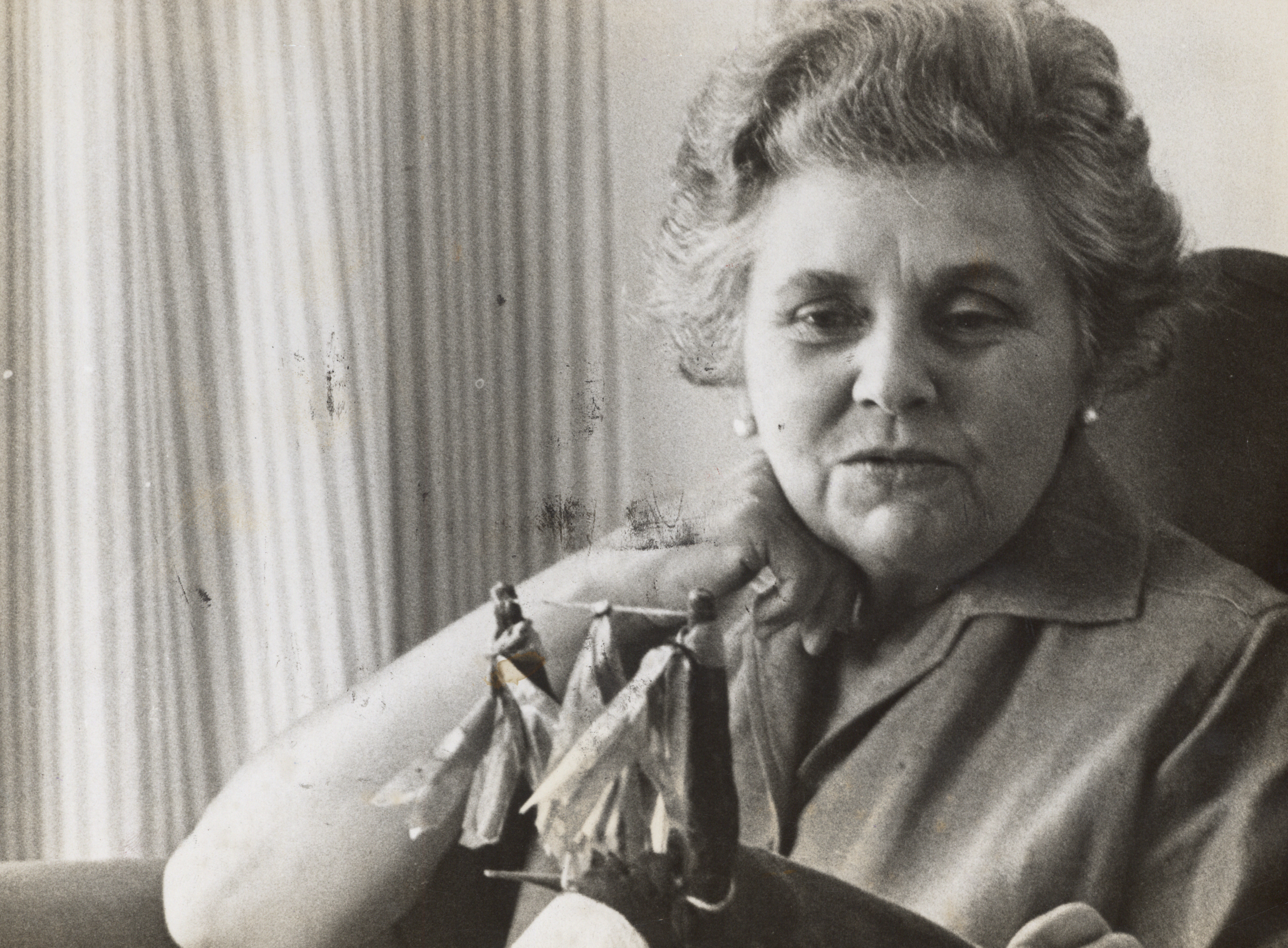
Bishop in Brazil in 1964

During her time in Brazil, Bishop became increasingly interested in the literature of the country. She was influenced by Brazilian poets, including João Cabral de Melo Neto and Carlos Drummond de Andrade, and translated their work into English. Regarding Andrade, she said, "I didn't know him at all. He's supposed to be very shy. I'm supposed to be very shy. We've met once — on the sidewalk at night. We had just come out of the same restaurant, and he kissed my hand politely when we were introduced." After Soares took her own life in 1967, Bishop spent more time in the United States.

== Publication history and awards ==
For a major American poet, Bishop published very sparingly. Her first book, North & South, was first published in 1946 and won the Houghton Mifflin Prize for poetry. This book included important poems like "The Man-Moth" (which describes a dark and lonely fictional creature inspired by what Bishop noted was "[a] newspaper misprint for 'mammoth'") and "The Fish" (in which Bishop describes a caught fish in exacting detail). But she did not publish a follow-up until nine years later. That volume, titled Poems: North & South—A Cold Spring, first published in 1955, included her first book, plus the 18 new poems that constituted the new "Cold Spring" section. Bishop won the Pulitzer Prize for this book in 1956.

Then there was another long wait before her next volume, Questions of Travel, in 1965. This book showed the influence that living in Brazil had had on Bishop's writing. It included poems in the book's first section that were explicitly about life in Brazil including "Arrival at Santos", "Manuelzinho", and "The Riverman". But in the second section of the volume Bishop also included pieces set in other locations like "In the Village" and "First Death in Nova Scotia", which take place in her native country. Questions of Travel was her first book to include one of her short stories (the aforementioned "In the Village").

Bishop's next major publication was The Complete Poems (1969), which included eight new poems and won a National Book Award. The last new book of poems to appear in her lifetime, Geography III (1977) included frequently anthologized poems like "In the Waiting Room" and "One Art". This book led to Bishop's being the first American and the first woman to be awarded the Neustadt International Prize for Literature.

Bishop's The Complete Poems, 1927–1979 was published posthumously in 1983. Other posthumous publications included The Collected Prose (1984; a compilation of her essays and short stories) and Edgar Allan Poe & the Juke-box: Uncollected Poems, Drafts, and Fragments (2006), whose publication aroused some controversy. Meghan O'Rourke notes in an article from Slate magazine,

It's no wonder ... that the recent publication of Bishop's hitherto uncollected poems, drafts, and fragments ... encountered fierce resistance, and some debate about the value of making this work available to the public. In an outraged piece for The New Republic, Helen Vendler labeled the drafts "maimed and stunted" and rebuked Farrar, Straus and Giroux for choosing to publish the volume.

However, the posthumous publications of Bishop's poetry do not stop there as in the spring of 2008, Elizabeth Bishop: Poems, Prose and Letters, edited by Robert Giroux and Lloyd Schwartz was released by the Library of America. The volume made hundreds of pages of unpublished poems, letters as well as book reviews accessible to the public.

Following this in the fall of that year came Words in Air: The Complete Correspondence between Elizabeth Bishop and Robert Lowell, edited by Thomas Travisano with Saskia Hamilton. It was within this collection that almost nine hundred pages of intimate letters between the major American poets were supplied to the public. In the wake of these new editions was the supplementary expansion of Bishop's oeuvre as well as a further insight into an almost “new” kind of Elizabeth Bishop whose personal life was intimate with only a selected few.

== Literary style and identity ==
Where some of her notable contemporaries like Robert Lowell and John Berryman made the intimate details of their personal lives an important part of their poetry, Bishop avoided this practice altogether. In contrast to this confessional style involving large amounts of self-exposure, Bishop's style of writing, though it did include a small amount of material from her personal life, was known for its highly detailed, objective, and distant point of view, and for its reticence on the kinds of personal subject matter that the work of her contemporaries involved. As Kirstin Hotelling Zona, assistant Professor of Poetry and Poetics at Illinois State University, writes in The Cambridge Companion to Elizabeth Bishop,

"For Elizabeth Bishop, writing poetry had less to do with self-expression than it did with probing the complex and often discomforting nature of self as it is shaped through interaction with the world."

She used discretion when writing about details and people from her life. "In the Village", a piece about her childhood and her mentally unstable mother, is written as a third-person narrative; the reader would only know of the story's autobiographical origins by knowing about Bishop's childhood.

Bishop did not see herself as a "lesbian poet" or as a "female poet". Because she refused to have her work published in all-female poetry anthologies, other female poets involved with the women's movement thought she was hostile towards the movement. For instance, a student at Harvard who was close to Bishop in the 60s, Kathleen Spivack, wrote in her memoir,

I think Bishop internalized the misogyny of the time. How could she not? ... Bishop had a very ambivalent relation to being a woman plus poet—plus lesbian—in the Boston/Cambridge/Harvard nexus ... Extremely vulnerable, sensitive, she hid much of her private life. She wanted nothing to do with anything that seemed to involve the women's movement. She internalized many of the male attitudes of the day toward women, who were supposed to be attractive, appealing to men, and not ask for equal pay or a job with benefits.

However, this was not necessarily how Bishop viewed herself. In an interview with The Paris Review from 1978, she said that, despite her insistence on being excluded from female poetry anthologies, she still considered herself to be "a strong feminist" but that she only wanted to be judged based on the quality of her writing and not on her gender or sexual orientation.

Although generally supportive of the "confessional" style of her friend, Robert Lowell, she drew the line at his highly controversial book The Dolphin (1973), in which he used and altered private letters from his ex-wife, Elizabeth Hardwick (whom he divorced after 23 years of marriage), as material for his poems. In a letter to Lowell, dated March 21, 1972, Bishop strongly urged him against publishing the book: "One can use one's life as material [for poems]—one does anyway—but these letters—aren't you violating a trust? IF you were given permission—IF you hadn't changed them... etc. But art just isn't worth that much."

=== "In the Waiting Room" ===
Bishop's "In the Waiting Room", written in 1976, addressed the chase for identity and individuality within a diverse society as a seven-year-old girl living in Worcester, Massachusetts, during World War I.

=== "First Death in Nova Scotia" ===
Bishop's poem "First Death in Nova Scotia", first published in 1965, describes her first encounter with death when her cousin Arthur died. In this poem, her experience of that event is through a child's point of view. The poem highlights that although young and naive the child has some instinctive awareness of the severe impact of death. She combines reality and imagination, a technique also used in her poem "Sestina".

=== "Sestina" ===
Bishop's poem "Sestina", published in 1956 in The New Yorker, depicts a real-life experience. After her father's death when she was a baby and following her mother's nervous breakdown when she was five, Bishop's poem notes her experience after she has gone to live with relatives. The poem is about her living with the knowledge that she would not see her mother again. Bishop writes, "Time to plant tears, says the almanac. / The grandmother sings to the marvelous stove / and the child draws another inscrutable house." The style of her poem, the sestina, is a poetry style created by Arnaut Daniel in the 12th century, focused on the emphases of ending words in each line, giving the poem a sense of form and pattern. Bishop is widely known for her skill in the sestina format.

== Teaching career ==
After the suicide of her long-term partner Lota (Maria Carlota) de Macedo Soares, Bishop arrived back in the United States, and eventually found a permanent position at Harvard University until she died in 1979. Before securing this position, she had a few other teaching jobs throughout the late 1960s until her death in the 70s, including University of Washington (1966), Harvard University (1970–1977) and Massachusetts Institute of Technology (1979).

She became a teacher primarily because she needed an income. She had run out of her father's inheritance and knew she needed to start working to support herself, so she decided to start teaching workshops and seminars in universities. She was described by students as "tactful", but the journal article "Elizabeth Bishop: Conversations and Class Notes" makes it clear she was appalled by their grammatical illiteracy, nonstandard usage, and inarticulate manner of speaking. In her conversations with Wesley Wehr and class notes taken from her 1966 workshops at the University of Washington, she observes, "I found out the other day, to my horror, that they don’t even know the difference between a colon and semicolon! Some of them speak so badly that I can’t tell whether they’re dumb or it’s some kind of local speech affectation or impediment". She was often described as a "perfectionist" and insisted the students in her lectures speak "Standard American English pronunciation". She was blunt in her feedback and wouldn't hold anything back if she didn't like a piece of writing, qualities on full display in the "Conversations and Class Notes," where she says, "Some of your rhymes are simply awful! And you seem to write a lot of free verse out here. I guess that’s what you call it. I was rather appalled". She had little patience with "mood poems," as she called them, dismissing them as too vague.

Even so, she offered helpful feedback, according to "Elizabeth Bishop at Harvard," and encouraged her students to be more daring.

== Later life ==
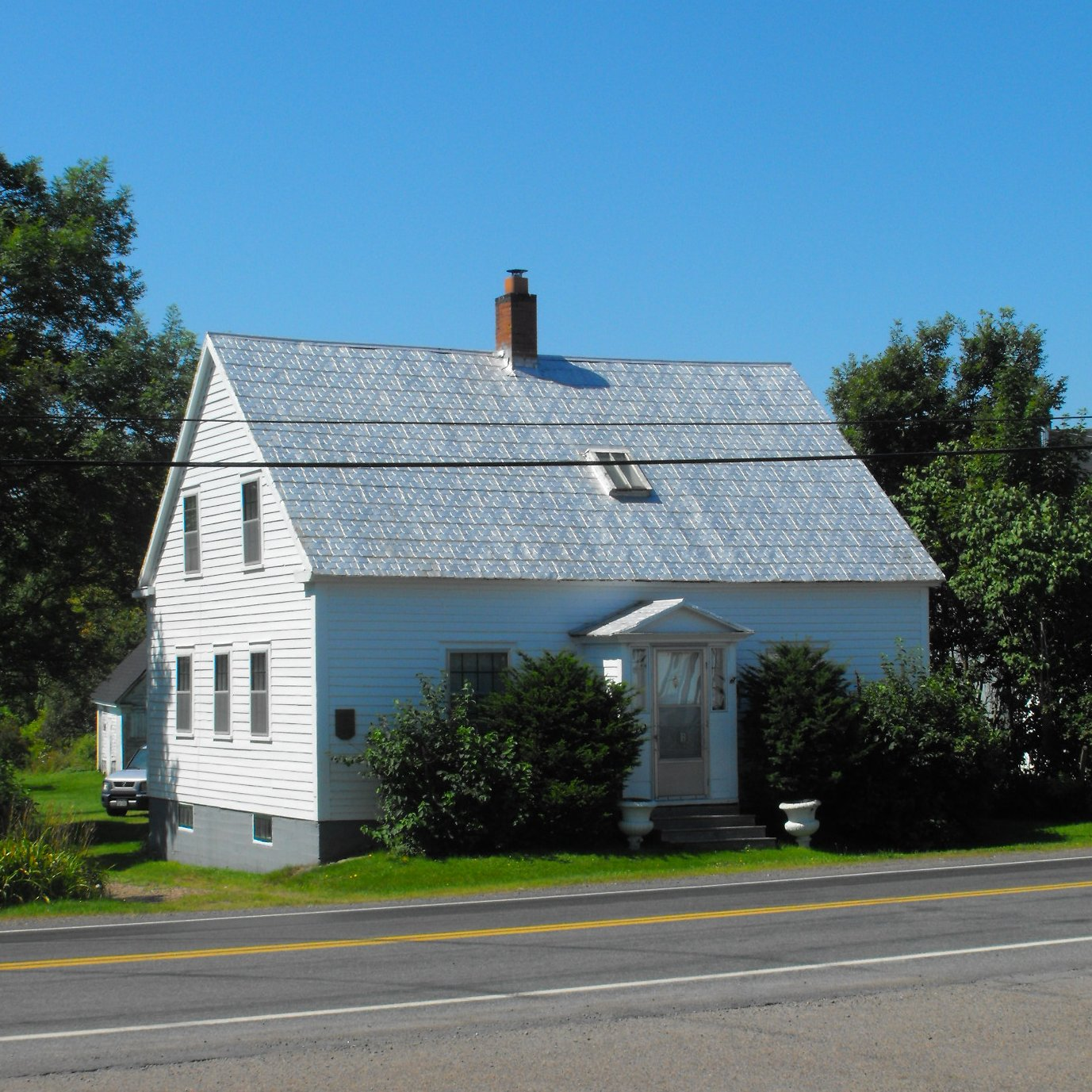
Elizabeth Bishop House

In 1971 Bishop began a relationship with Alice Methfessel, who became her literary executor. Never a prolific writer, Bishop noted that she would begin many projects and leave them unfinished. Two years after publishing her last book, Geography III (1977), she died of a cerebral aneurysm in her apartment at Lewis Wharf, Boston, and is buried in Hope Cemetery (Worcester, Massachusetts). Her requested epitaph, the last two lines from her poem "The Bight" — "All the untidy activity continues, / awful but cheerful" — was added, along with her inscription, to the family monument in 1997, on the occasion of the Elizabeth Bishop Conference and Poetry Festival in Worcester.

After her death, the Elizabeth Bishop House, an artists' retreat in Great Village, Nova Scotia, was dedicated to her memory. Vassar College Library acquired her literary and personal papers in 1981. Her personal correspondence and manuscripts appear in numerous other literary collections in American research libraries.

== In popular culture ==
Her work and life experiences influenced and contributed to multiple pieces of media, literature and stage plays.

Reaching for the Moon (2013) is a Brazilian movie about Bishop's life when she was living in Brazil with Lota de Macedo Soares. The Portuguese title of the film is Flores Raras.

In Her Shoes (2005) and Still Alice (2014) include Elizabeth's poem "One Art".

The one woman play A safe harbor for Elizabeth Bishop (2001–2006) was written and performed in Portuguese and later shown on Broadway with Amy Irving.

Author Michael Sledge published the novel The More I Owe You, about Bishop and Soares, in 2010.

Bishop's friendship with Robert Lowell was the subject of the play Dear Elizabeth, by Sarah Ruhl, which was first performed at the Yale Repertory Theater in 2012. The play was adapted from the two poets' letters which were collected in the book Words in Air: The Complete Correspondence Between Elizabeth Bishop and Robert Lowell.

In the television show Breaking Bad, episode 2.13, "ABQ", Jane's father enters her bedroom where there is a photograph of Elizabeth Bishop on the wall. Earlier, the father had told the police that Jane's mother's maiden name was Bishop.

== Awards and honors ==
- 1945: Houghton Mifflin Poetry Prize Fellowship
- 1947: Guggenheim Fellowship
- 1949: Appointed Consultant in Poetry at the Library of Congress
- 1950: American Academy of Arts and Letters Award
- 1951: Lucy Martin Donelly Fellowship (awarded by Bryn Mawr College)
- 1953: Shelley Memorial Award
- 1954: Elected to lifetime membership in the National Institute of Arts and Letters
- 1956: Pulitzer Prize for Poetry
- 1960: Chapelbrook Foundation Award
- 1964: Academy of American Poets Fellowship
- 1968: Fellow of the American Academy of Arts and Sciences
- 1968: Ingram Merrill Foundation Grant
- 1969: The Order of Rio Branco (awarded by the Brazilian government)
- 1970: National Book Award for Poetry
- 1974: Harriet Monroe Poetry Award
- 1976: Books Abroad/Neustadt International Prize
- 1976: Elected to the American Academy of Arts and Letters
- 1977: National Book Critics Circle Award
- 1978: Guggenheim Fellowship
- 2010: Elected to inaugural class of the New York Writers Hall of Fame

== Works ==
Poetry collections

- North & South (Houghton Mifflin, 1946)
- Poems: North & South. A Cold Spring (Houghton Mifflin, 1955) —winner of the Pulitzer Prize
- A Cold Spring (Houghton Mifflin, 1956)
- Questions of Travel (Farrar, Straus, and Giroux, 1965)
- The Complete Poems (Farrar, Straus, and Giroux, 1969) —winner of the National Book Award
- Geography III (Farrar, Straus, and Giroux, 1976)
- The Complete Poems: 1927–1979 (Farrar, Straus, and Giroux, 1983)
- Edgar Allan Poe & The Juke-Box: Uncollected Poems, Drafts, and Fragments by Elizabeth Bishop ed. Alice Quinn (Farrar, Straus, and Giroux, 2006)
- Poems, Prose and Letters by Elizabeth Bishop, ed. Robert Giroux (Library of America, 2008) ISBN 9781598530179
- Poems (Farrar, Straus, and Giroux, 2011)

Other works

- The Diary of Helena Morley by Alice Brant, translated and with an introduction by Elizabeth Bishop, (Farrar, Straus, and Cudahy, 1957)
- The Ballad of the Burglar of Babylon (Farrar, Straus, and Giroux, 1968)
- An Anthology of Twentieth Century Brazilian Poetry, edited by Elizabeth Bishop and Emanuel Brasil, (Wesleyan University Press (1972)
- The Collected Prose (Farrar, Straus, and Giroux, 1984)
- One Art: Letters, selected and edited by Robert Giroux (Farrar, Straus, and Giroux, 1994)
- Exchanging Hats: Elizabeth Bishop Paintings, edited and with an introduction by William Benton (Farrar, Straus, and Giroux, 1996)
- Words in Air: The Complete Correspondence Between Elizabeth Bishop and Robert Lowell, ed. Thomas Travisano, Saskia Hamilton (Farrar, Straus & Giroux, 2008)
- Conversations with Elizabeth Bishop, George Monteiro Ed. (University Press of Mississippi 1996)

Stories

Collected in The Collected Prose (1984).

- "The Sea & Its Shore," Life and Letters To-day (Winter 1937)
- "The Baptism," Life and Letters To-day (Spring 1937)
- "In Prison," Partisan Review 4.4 (March 1938)
- "The Farmer's Children," Harper's Bazaar (February 1948)
- "The Housekeeper," The New Yorker (September 11, 1948)
- "Gwendolyn," The New Yorker (June 27, 1953)
- "In the Village," The New Yorker (December 19, 1953)
- "Memories of Uncle Neddy," Southern Review 13.4 (Autumn 1977)

== See also ==
- Lesbian literature
