= Pablo García Pérez de Lara =

Spanish filmmaker

- Born: Pablo García Pérez de Lara; 29 October 1970 (age 55); Barcelona, Spain
- Education: Center d'Estudis Cinematogràfics de Catalunya
- Occupations: Director; producer; writer; author
- Years active: 1996–present
- Website: www.pablogarciaperezdelara.com

Pablo García Pérez de Lara (born 29 October 1970), is a Spanish filmmaker and screenwriter. He is most notable as the director of critically acclaimed African documentaries such as Tchindas.

== Personal life ==
He was born in 1970 in Barcelona, Spain. He studied at the Center d'Estudis Cinematogràfics de Catalunya (CECC).

== Career ==
In 1996, he started his directorial debut with the film Fuente Álamo, the Caress of Time as a project grant from the Barcelona Alternativa festival. He completed the film in 2001 and then selected at the SEMINCI in Valladolid. The film had official selection in Karlovy Vary. Then in 2007, he made the film Butterfly which made the official section of Karlovy Vary and San Sebastián. In 2015, he made the critically acclaimed documentary Tchindas co-directed with Marc Serena. It was selected in several international film festivals and won 14 international awards. The film later won Outfest's Grand Jury Award for Excellence in Filmmaking.

In 2002, he made the short film Alicia Portrayed which was selected by the Cannes Film Festival's Critics' Week in 2003. In the meantime, Pablo made the two documentaries Son de Galicia in 2006 and Mura, un poble de cine in 2010 for television. Then he worked as the cinematographer of the critically acclaimed 2009 documentary Familystrip. In 2011, he made the documentary Oblidant a Nonot. It received the City of Alcalá award at Alcine 2011, as well as the Audience Award at l'Alternativa de Barcelona 2011 and Best Short Film in Sign Language at Cinemobile de Sevilla 2011. Then in 2012, he was the cinematographer of the film El efecto K. El montador de Stalin which was screened in 60 international festivals across the globe.

== Filmography ==
Year	Film	Role	Genre	Ref.
1994	Plou sobre Alabama	Cinematographer	Short film	
1998	Por allí no pasan autobuses	Cinematographer	Short film	
1986	Alien Predator	Man in Store	Documentary	
1999	El jardinero	Narco	Documentary	
2001	Vos, que sos mi hermana	Cinematographer, editor	Documentary	
2002	Fuente Álamo, la caricia del tiempo	Director, producer, writer	Documentary	
2003	Alicia retratada	Director, producer, writer, editor	Short film	
2005	Mapuche nación que vuelve	Director, producer, writer	Documentary	
2007	Bolboreta, mariposa, papallona	Director, producer, writer, editor	Documentary	
2009	Familystrip	Cinematographer	Documentary	
2011	Oblidant a Nonot	Director, writer	Documentary short	
2012	El efecto K. El montador de Stalin	Cinematographer	Film	
2015	Tchindas	Director, writer, cinematographer	Documentary	

== See also ==
- Belfast Film Festival
- List of LGBT-related films of 2015
