= Paris 05:59: Théo & Hugo =

2016 film by Olivier Ducastel and Jacques Martineau

- Theatrical release poster
- French: Théo et Hugo dans le même bateau
- Directed by: Olivier Ducastel; Jacques Martineau
- Written by: Olivier Ducastel; Jacques Martineau
- Produced by: Emmanuel Chaumet
- Starring: Geoffrey Couët; François Nambot
- Cinematography: Manuel Marmier
- Edited by: Pierre Deschamps
- Music by: Karelle+Kuntur
- Production companies: Ecce Films; Epicentre Films
- Distributed by: Epicentre Films
- Release dates: 15 February 2016 (Berlin); 27 April 2016 (France)
- Running time: 97 minutes
- Country: France
- Language: French

Paris 05:59: Théo & Hugo (French: Théo et Hugo dans le même bateau; also known as Theo and Hugo in some territories) is a 2016 French erotic romantic drama film written and directed by Olivier Ducastel and Jacques Martineau. It was shown in the Panorama section at the 66th Berlin International Film Festival. The film won the Audience Award at the Berlin Festival's 2016 Teddy Awards.

The film stars Geoffrey Couët and François Nambot as two gay men who meet during the film's 20-minute opening scene at L'Impact, a gay sex club, and follows them as they get to know each other during the next two hours, biking and walking in northeast Paris, visiting a hospital, riding the metro, visiting one's apartment, and encountering a woman on the Paris Métro and a counter server in a kebab shop. The action of the film begins at 4:27 am and concludes at 5:59 am. The film received favourable reviews from critics.

== Production ==
The film was shot over the course of fifteen days, including nine nights, on a small budget. The original script presented the story over the course of 28 days but was later changed to occur in real time for 93 minutes during the early morning hours.

== Cast ==
- Geoffrey Couët as Théo
- François Nambot as Hugo

== Reception ==
The film received favourable reviews from critics. On Rotten Tomatoes it has an approval rating of 92% with an average score of 6.90/10 out of 25 critics, while on Metacritic it has a score of 74% out of 11 critics.
