= Reaching for the Moon (2013 film) =

2013 film directed by Bruno Barreto

- Directed by: Bruno Barreto
- Written by: Carolina Kotscho; Matthew Chapman
- Based on: Flores Raras e Banalíssimas by Carmen L. Oliveira
- Produced by: Paula Barreto; Lucy Barreto
- Starring: Glória Pires; Miranda Otto; Tracy Middendorf; Treat Williams; Marcello Airoldi; Luciana Souza; Tânia Costa; Marianna Mac Nieven
- Cinematography: Mauro Pinheiro Jr.
- Edited by: Leticia Giffoni
- Music by: Marcelo Zarvos
- Distributed by: Cinema Management Group (International Sales Agent); Imagem Filmes (Brazil)
- Release date: August 16, 2013 (Brazil)
- Running time: 118 minutes
- Country: Brazil
- Languages: Portuguese; English
- Budget: R$ 13,000,000

Reaching for the Moon (Portuguese: Flores Raras, "Rare Flowers") is a 2013 Brazilian biographical drama film, written by Julie Sayres and Matthew Chapman, directed by Bruno Barreto. The film is based on the book Flores Raras e Banalíssimas (in English, Rare and Commonplace Flowers), by Carmen L. Oliveira.

The film dramatizes the love story of the American poet Elizabeth Bishop and the Brazilian architect Lota de Macedo Soares. Set largely in Petrópolis between the years 1951 and 1967, the film tells the story of Bishop's passionate and often tumultuous life with Soares in Brazil.

== Cast ==
- Glória Pires as Lota de Macedo Soares
- Miranda Otto as Elizabeth Bishop
- Tracy Middendorf as Mary Morse
- Treat Williams as Robert Lowell
- Marcello Airoldi as Carlos Lacerda
- Lola Kirke as Margaret
- Luciana Souza as Joana
- Tânia Costa as Dindinha
- Marianna Mac Nieven as Malu

== Release ==
Reaching for the Moon had its world premiere at the Berlin Film Festival, before screening at Tribeca Film Festival and opening the 2014 Mardi Gras Film Festival.

Following the sold-out screenings at Mardi Gras Film Festival, distributor Leap Frog Films announced it was planning a limited release across Australia in 2014.

== International distribution ==
The International distribution rights were licensed by Cinema Management Group.
