= The Shiny Shrimps =

2019 film by Cédric Le Gallo and Maxime Govare

- Theatrical release poster
- French: Les Crevettes pailletées
- Directed by: Cédric Le Gallo; Maxime Govare
- Written by: Cédric Le Gallo; Maxime Govare
- Produced by: Renaud Chélélékian; Édouard Duprey
- Starring: Nicolas Gob; Alban Lenoir; Michaël Abiteboul; David Baïot; Romain Lancry; Roland Menou; Geoffrey Couët; Romain Brau; Félix Martinez
- Cinematography: Jérôme Alméras
- Edited by: Samuel Danési
- Music by: Thomas Couzinier; Frédéric Kooshmanian
- Production companies: Les Improductibles; Kaly Productions
- Distributed by: Universal Pictures International France
- Release dates: 19 January 2019 (Alpe d'Huez); 8 May 2019 (France)
- Running time: 100 minutes
- Country: France
- Language: French

The Shiny Shrimps (French: Les Crevettes pailletées) is a 2019 French sports comedy film directed by Cédric Le Gallo and Maxime Govare. The film stars Nicolas Gob as Matthias Le Goff, an Olympic swimming champion who makes a homophobic comment in a television interview, and is disciplined by the national swim team with the responsibility of coaching a gay water polo team who aspire to compete in the Gay Games.

The film premiered at the L'Alpe d'Huez Film Festival on 19 January 2019, and was released theatrically in France on 8 May 2019. A sequel, The Revenge of the Shiny Shrimps (French: La Revanche des Crevettes pailletées), was released on 13 April 2022.

== Synopsis ==
Mathias Le Goff is a world vice-champion swimmer. After making homophobic comments during a television interview, he is sanctioned to train the glittering Shiny Shrimp, a gay water polo team, for three months for their participation in the Gay Games in Croatia. Two worlds that everything seems to oppose will have to team up as best they can.

== Cast ==
- Nicolas Gob as Matthias Le Goff
- Alban Lenoir as Jean
- Michaël Abiteboul as Cédric
- David Baïot as Alex
- Romain Lancry as Damien
- Roland Menou as Joël
- Geoffrey Couët as Xavier
- Romain Brau as Fred
- Félix Martinez as Vincent
- Maïa Quesemand as Victoire
- Pierre Samuel as Bertrand
- Jean-Louis Barcelona as Hervé Langlois
- Yvon Back as President of French Swimming Federation

== Production ==
Principal photography began on 4 June 2018 with one week of shooting in Croatia. Filming was scheduled for a total of seven weeks, with five weeks taking place in the Grand Est region: In early July, filming was in full-swing in Alsace. The production was shooting in Eschentzwiller, Muespach, the Piscine des Jonquilles in Illzach and the municipal baths on Rue Pierre-et-Marie-Curie in Mulhouse, where the film's grand finale was shot. The following week, filming moved to Strasbourg. One week of filming took place in Paris, including the final day of shooting on 4 August 2018 when footage was recorded at the Stade Jean-Bouin for the opening ceremony of the 2018 Gay Games.

== Reception ==
On Rotten Tomatoes, the film holds an approval rating of 75% based on reviews from 28 critics, with an average rating of 6.3/10. The website's critics consensus reads, "The Shiny Shrimps traffics in cliche, but for fans of inspirational underdog stories, the results may be too uplifting to resist."

The film received much support in public through popular presentations that included local LGBT/queer athletes.

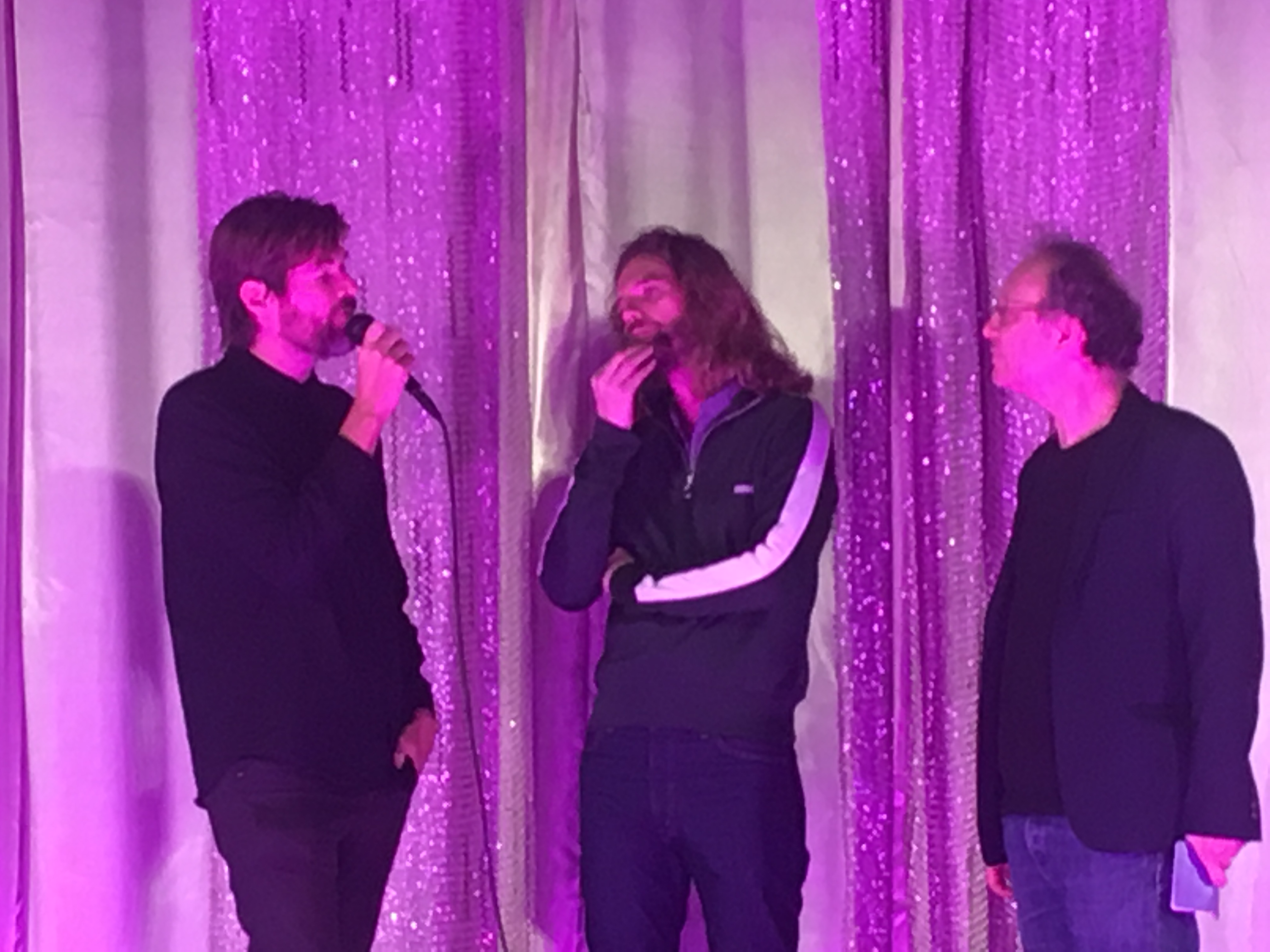
Authors presenting the movie Berlin's MonGay program of Kino International, 2019

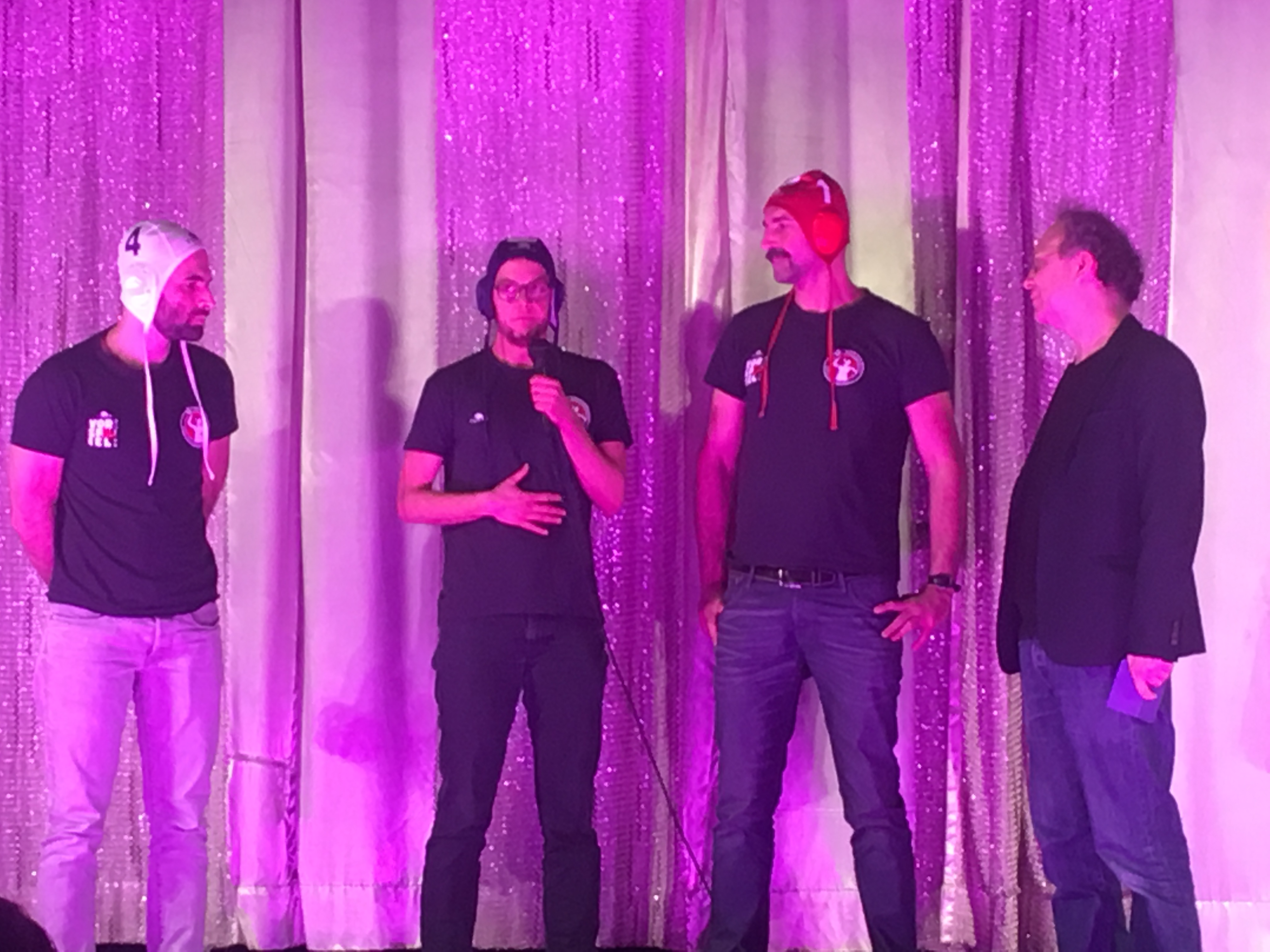
'Berlin Aquaholics' water polo players joined for talk

During the COVID-19 pandemic, the film remained a popular suggestion in LGBT+ media listings of video on demand.

=== Accolades ===
Award	Date of ceremony	Category	Recipient(s)	Result	Ref.
L'Alpe d'Huez Film Festival	20 January 2019	Special Jury Award — Feature Film	The Shiny Shrimps	Won	
Molodist Kyiv International Film Festival	6 June 2019	Best LGBTQ Film	The Shiny Shrimps	Nominated	
Reel Q: Pittsburgh LGBTQ+ Film Festival	12 October 2019	Best Narrative Feature	The Shiny Shrimps	Won	
Französische Filmtage Tübingen	6 November 2019	Prix du Public	The Shiny Shrimps	Won	
