= Lota de Macedo Soares =

Brazilian landscape designer

- Born: Maria Carlota Costallat de Macedo Soares; 16 March 1910; Paris, France
- Died: 25 September 1967 (aged 57); New York City, New York, U.S.
- Occupation: Architect

Maria Carlota "Lota" Costallat de Macedo Soares (16 March 1910 – 25 September 1967) was a Brazilian landscape designer and architect. Despite not having a degree in either area, she was invited by governor Carlos Lacerda to design and oversee the construction of Flamengo Park in Rio de Janeiro. She was born in Paris, France into a prominent political family from Rio de Janeiro.

== Biography ==
Lota, as she was known, had a relationship with the American poet Elizabeth Bishop from 1951 to 1967. Bishop dedicated her 1965 volume of poems Questions of Travel to her. Their relationship is depicted in the Brazilian film Reaching for the Moon, based on the book Flores Raras e Banalíssimas (in English, Rare and Commonplace Flowers), by Carmen Lucia de Oliveira, as well as in the book The More I Owe You, by American author Michael Sledge.

In 1967, after Soares had been through a period of extensive hospitalization for a nervous breakdown, she joined Bishop in New York City. The same day she arrived in New York, 19 September 1967, Soares took an overdose of tranquilizers. It is believed that problems with her work and her failing relationship with Bishop were what led to her suicide. She died several days later.

== Tribute ==
On March 16, 2017, Google celebrated the 107th anniversary of her birth with a Google Doodle.

== See also ==
- Flamengo Park
- Elizabeth Bishop
