= Geoffrey Couët =

French actor and comedian

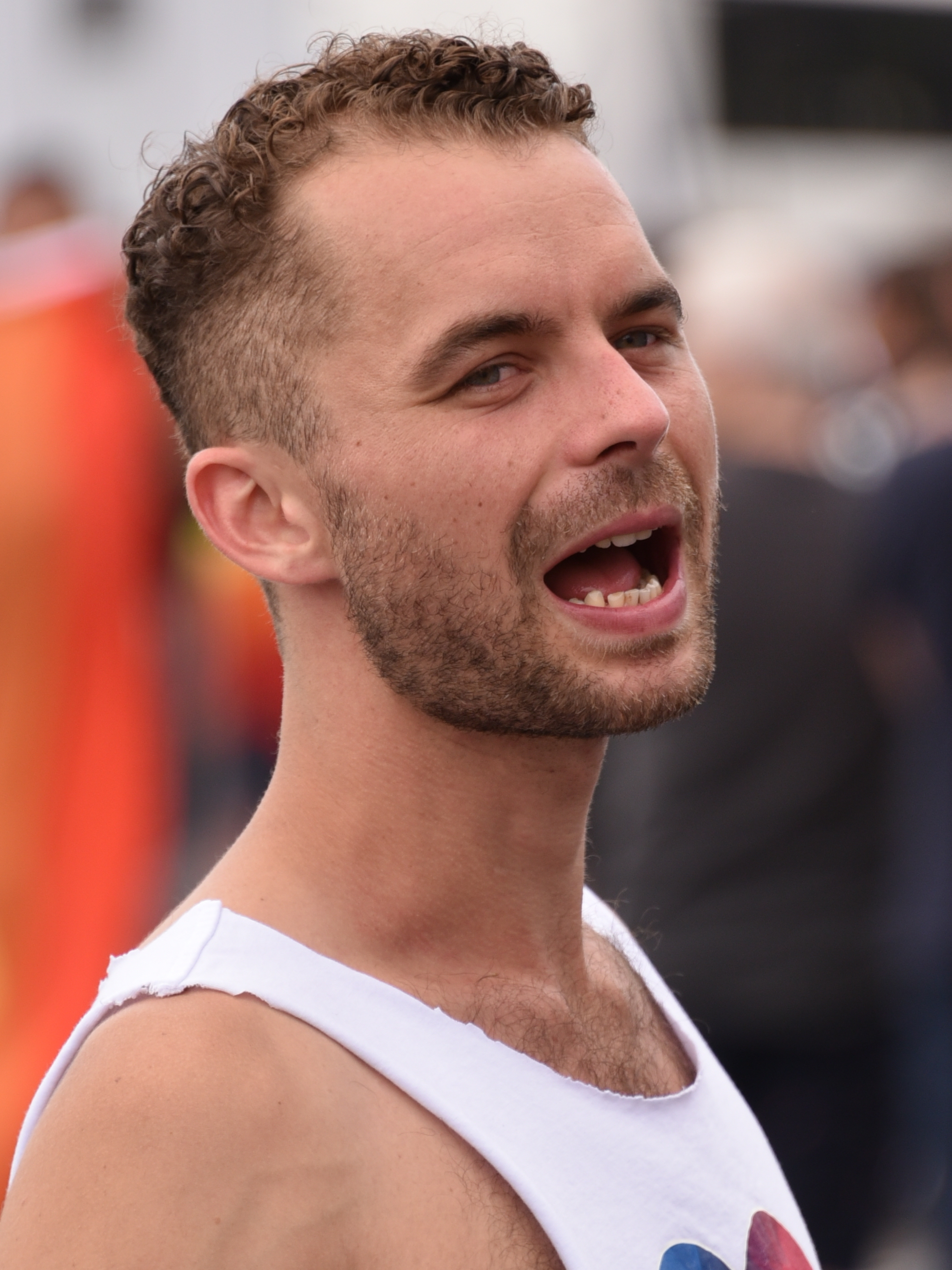
- Couët in 2017
- Born: 27 May 1988 (age 38); Nantes, France
- Occupation: Actor

Geoffrey Couët (born 27 May 1988) is a French actor and comedian.

== Biography ==
Geoffrey Couët studied acting at the Cours Florent beginning in 2006. He won an award for best comedy actor for a production of Rent in 2009. He is also a dancer and director. His first short film L'Extra-tragique destin des Moutardes, co-written and co-directed with Frédéric Brodard, received the Best Screenplay Award at the Short Film Festival in Troyes. He was a juror for the International Short Film competition at the Tel Aviv International LGBT Film Festival in 2016.

== Filmography ==
=== Cinema ===
- 2009 : Anomymat by Christophe Karabache
- 2014 : Mat by Olivier l'Inconnu
- 2014 : Air conditionné by Ivan Frésard
- 2014 : Saint Laurent by Bertrand Bonello
- 2016 : Un homme à la hauteur by Laurent Tirard
- 2016 : Père et fils, Thérapie by Émile Gaudreault
- 2016 : Paris 05:59: Théo & Hugo (Théo et Hugo dans le même bateau) by Olivier Ducastel and Jacques Martineau : Théo
- 2019 : The Shiny Shrimps (Les crevettes pailletées) by Cédric Le Gallo and Maxime Govare
- 2021 : Down in Paris by Antony Hickling
- 2022 : The Revenge of the Shiny Shrimps (La revanche des crevette pailletées) by Cédric Le Gallo and Maxime Govare

=== Television ===
- 2014 : La Voyante by Henri Helman : Jérôme
- 2015 : Camping Paradis by Philippe Proteau : Une star au camping (episode 39)
- 2015 : Section de recherches by Hervé Renoh : Bachelor (episode 103)
- 2015 : La Tueuse caméléon by Josée Dayan
