= Kathleen Spivack =

American poet and author (born 1938)

Kathleen Spivack, née Drucker is an American poet and author.

== Life ==
Spivack was born in New York, NY, and was raised in North Bennington, VT. The eldest daughter of Peter Drucker, she graduated from Oberlin College in 1959 and won a fellowship to study at Boston University with Robert Lowell.

Her writing has been published The New Yorker, Ploughshares, The Atlantic Monthly, Poetry, Massachusetts Review, Virginia Quarterly, The Southern Review, Harvard Review, The Paris Review, The Kenyon Review, Agni and New Letters.

She has held posts at the University of Paris VII-VIII, the University of Francoise Rabelais, Tours, the University of Versailles, and at the Ecole Superieure (Polytechnique). She was a Fulbright Senior Artist/Professor in Creative Writing in France (1993–95).

== Books ==
- Homage, Wilderness House Press, 2024, ISBN 9781733118538
- Unspeakable Things, New York: A. Knopf, 2016, ISBN 9780385353960
- With Robert Lowell and His Circle, University Press of New England, 2012, ISBN 978-1555537883
- A History of Yearning, The Sow's Ear Poetry Review, 2010, ISBN 978-0615394060
- Moments of Past Happiness, Earthwinds Editions, 2007, ISBN 978-0976776017
- The Beds We Lie In, Scarecrow Press, 1986, ISBN 978-0810818408
- The Honeymoon, Graywolf Short Fiction Series, 1986, ISBN 978-0915308859
- Swimmer in the Spreading Dawn, Apple-wood Books, 1981 ISBN 978-0918222244
