= Tchindas =

2015 Spanish-Cape Verdean documentary film

- Theatrical release poster
- Directed by: Pablo García Pérez de Lara; Marc Serena
- Produced by: Yolanda Olmos; Marc Serena
- Starring: Tchinda Andrade; Elvis Tolentino; Edinha Pitanga
- Cinematography: Pablo García Pérez de Lara
- Edited by: Pablo García Pérez de Lara
- Music by: Cesária Évora
- Production company: Doble Banda
- Distributed by: Cat&Docs
- Release date: 15 July 2015 (Outfest Film Festival Los Angeles)
- Running time: 94 minutes
- Countries: Spain; Cabo Verde
- Language: Cape Verdean Creole

Tchindas is a 2015 Spanish-Cape Verdean documentary film directed by Pablo García Pérez de Lara and Marc Serena. The film premiered at the Outfest Los Angeles 2015 where it received a Grand Jury Award.

== Plot ==
In the Atlantic Ocean, the tiny island of São Vicente works together to make something beautiful out of nothing: a Carnival. During the month leading up to the festivities the viewer discovers the struggles needed to achieve it through a person that coined a word: Tchinda.

It is shot in the most gay-friendly African country, Cape Verde, according to Afrobarometer's 2016 report.

== Cast ==
- Tchinda Andrade as herself
- Elvis Tolentino as himself
- Edinha Pitanga as herself

== Recognition ==
The Hollywood Reporter praised the film, writing it was "a beautifully shot vérité chronicle of the all-consuming Carnival preparations on São Vicente". Tchindas picked up six awards in the five festivals which until now has been presented in competition: the Outfest, the Chicago Reeling LGBT Film Festival, MiradasDoc, and LesGaiCineMad. It has also been screened at Seminci and is in competition at the In-Edit and View São Paulo International Film Festival. The African Artists' Association praised the film for its story, background, and depth, writing that it showed "a vivid sense of place, community and personalities [that] comes through in the keenly observed film by Pablo Garcia Perez de Lara and Marc Serena, which reveals a seamless fusion of tradition and open-hearted acceptance." Chicago Reader praised the project and wrote of the film and its subject.

=== Reception ===
Of the film's screening at the REELING:Chicago LGBTQ+ International Film Festival, the Windy City Times stated it was a "Documentary Centerpiece" and referred to it as "a glittery, oh-so-fabulous examination of a little-seen culture reminiscent of Paris Is Burning".

=== Awards and nomination ===
- 2015, won Outfest's Grand Jury Award for 'Excellence in Filmmaking'

== See also ==
- List of lesbian, gay, bisexual or transgender-related films of 2015
- LGBT rights in Cape Verde
