= Marc Serena =

Spanish journalist and filmmaker

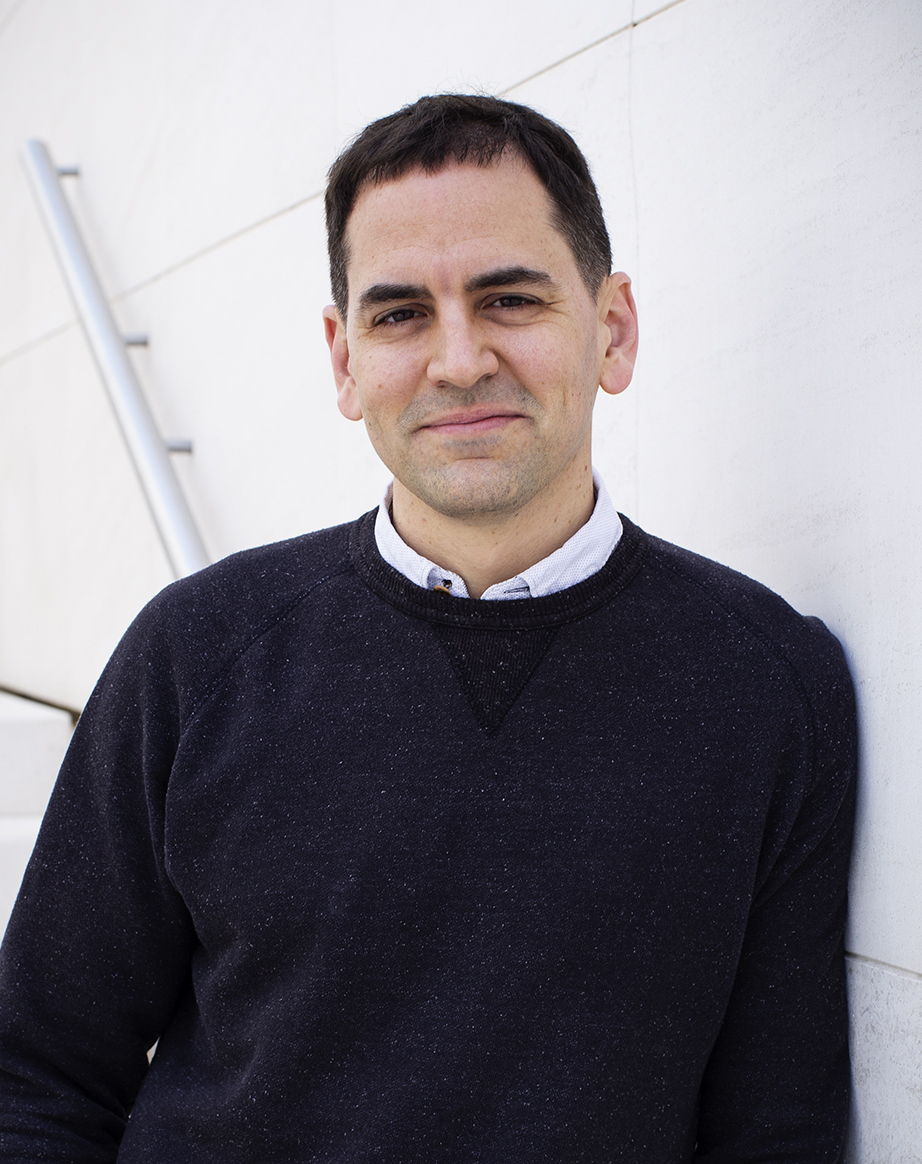
- Born: Marc Serena; 1983 (age 42–43)? Manresa, Spain
- Occupations: Director, producer, writer, author
- Years active: 2007–present

Marc Serena (born 1983), is a Spanish filmmaker, journalist and author. He is most notable as the director of critically acclaimed African documentaries such as Tchindas, Peixos d'aigua dolça and The Writer from a Country Without Bookstores.

== Personal life ==
He was born in 1983 in Manresa, Spain and currently lives in Barcelona.

== Career ==
In 2011 at the age of 25, he wrote the book Trip to the 25 which had a great success in Asia. It was later released in five languages including Chinese and Korean. In 2014, Serena published Un-African love?, which compiling queer voices from 15 African countries. Then he directed the web documentary Double Epidemic in 2015. In the same year, Serena wrote and directed the critically acclaimed film Tchindas, co-directed with Pablo García Pérez de Lara. The film later won Outfest's Grand Jury Award for Excellence in Filmmaking.

With the success in the film, he made his next film Double Epidemic in the same year. In 2018, he directed the film Peixos d'aigua dolça and then The Writer from a Country Without Bookstores in 2019. Meanwhile, in 2009, his blog was awarded by Lonely Planet as the best non-English travel blog.

== Filmography ==
| Year | Film | Role | Genre | Ref. |
|---|---|---|---|---|
| 2007 | En realidad | Writer | TV series documentary | |
| 2008 | Passaport BCN | Writer | TV series | |
| 2012 | Nius | Writer | TV series | |
| 2013 | Valors | Writer | TV movie documentary | |
| 2015 | Tchindas | Director, writer, executive producer | Documentary | |
| 2018 | Peixos d'aigua dolça | Director, writer, executive producer | Documentary | |
| 2019 | Un jour en .. | Producer | TV series documentary | |
| 2019 | The Writer from a Country Without Bookstores | Co-director | Documentary | |

== See also ==
- Belfast Film Festival
