= Cliffhanger (1993 film) =

1993 American film by Renny Harlin

- Theatrical release poster
- Directed by: Renny Harlin
- Screenplay by: Michael France; Sylvester Stallone
- Story by: Michael France
- Based on: A premise by John Long
- Produced by: Alan Marshall; Renny Harlin; Mario Kassar
- Starring: Sylvester Stallone; John Lithgow; Michael Rooker; Janine Turner; Leon Robinson; Paul Winfield; Ralph Waite
- Cinematography: Alex Thomson
- Edited by: Frank J. Urioste
- Music by: Trevor Jones
- Production companies: Carolco Pictures; Le Studio Canal+; Pioneer; RCS Video
- Distributed by: TriStar Pictures
- Release dates: May 20, 1993 (Cannes); May 28, 1993 (United States)
- Running time: 113 minutes
- Country: United States
- Language: English
- Budget: $70 million
- Box office: $255 million

Cliffhanger is a 1993 American action thriller film starring Sylvester Stallone as a mountain climber who becomes embroiled in the heist of a U.S. Treasury plane flying through the Rocky Mountains. It is directed by Renny Harlin and written by Stallone and Michael France. It also stars John Lithgow, Michael Rooker and Janine Turner. It was the last film to use the 1984–1993 TriStar Pictures logo. It is the first installment in the Cliffhanger film series.

The film premiered at the 1993 Cannes Film Festival on May 20, 1993, and was released in the United States on May 28, 1993, by TriStar Pictures. It received mixed to positive reviews and earned $255 million worldwide against a $70 million budget, becoming the 7th-highest-grossing film of 1993.

== Plot ==
Mountain rescue rangers Gabe Walker, his girlfriend Jessie Deighan, and Frank attempt to rescue their fellow ranger Hal Tucker and his girlfriend Sarah, stranded in the Colorado Rockies. Sarah's harness breaks loose, and she falls to her death, despite Walker's effort to save her. Hal blames a guilt-stricken Walker, who leaves the ranger service.

Eight months later, Walker returns to collect his belongings and persuade Jessie to leave with him, but she refuses. Meanwhile, psychopathic former military intelligence operative Eric Qualen orchestrates the robbery of over $100 million in three suitcases of uncirculated bills. Turncoat U.S. Treasury agent Richard Travers hijacks the McDonnell Douglas DC-9 carrying the money, betraying and shooting his team members, and attempting to transfer the cases in midair to Qualen and his team of mercenaries aboard a Lockheed JetStar. One of the wounded agents, Matheson, shoots at the criminals before the DC-9 is blown up, forcing the JetStar to crash land in the Rockies and scattering the cases across the mountainside. Meanwhile, FBI agents visit Treasury agent Walter Wright, Travers' superior, and warn him that Qualen has the resources and experience to organize the robbery, that Matheson was sent undercover to stop it, and that Qualen is armed.

Hal remains bitter over Sarah's death. He responds to a fake distress call from the mercenaries, while Jessie convinces Gabe to help. He and Hal are taken prisoner by Qualen, Travers, and their accomplices Kristel, Kynette, Delmar, Ryan, and Heldon. Using Travers' beacon locator, Hal and Walker are ordered to track down the first case atop a steep rock face. Walker is tethered and forced to climb and retrieve the case, but Hal warns that Qualen will kill him, and Walker severs his rope before he can be yanked down. Heldon opens fire and is killed by the ensuing avalanche, which leads Qualen to believe the case is lost and Walker is dead.

While Hal is forced to lead the mercenaries onward, Walker races ahead and finds Jessie at an old ranger station. They recover mountaineering gear and reach the second case before Qualen arrives at nightfall, burning the money to stay warm and leaving him a taunting message, "Want to trade?" Looking through night-vision goggles, Ryan spots Walker and Jessie, but Gabe blinds him with a flare, and the two slide down a slope. Ryan careens over the edge of a cliff to his death in a gorge. The next morning, Walker and Jessie race to beat Qualen to the last case, while Hal tries to warn away two young climbers, Evan and Brett, before Qualen's men open fire. Brett is killed, but a wounded Evan base jumps off the mountain and parachutes to safety.

Frank, scouting the mountain by helicopter in search of his friends, rescues Evan. Kynette confronts Walker in a brutal fistfight in a cave, but Walker impales him on a stalactite after Kynette threatens Jessie's life. Hal alerts him that the gang has rigged explosives above the cave, and Walker and Jessie narrowly escape. The mercenaries flag down Frank in his rescue helicopter, and Delmar fatally shoots him. When Travers attempts to betray the others, Qualen forces him to stay by killing Kristel, leaving Qualen as their only pilot.

As the mercenaries split up to look for the last case, Hal stabs Delmar in his right leg with Frank's knife, then kills Delmar with his own shotgun and escapes, while Walker recovers the money from the last case. He plants the tracking beacon on a rabbit to frustrate an increasingly unhinged Travers, who rants at Qualen over the walkie-talkie, thereby allowing the authorities to track their position. Pursued by Travers, Walker falls into a frozen river but kills Travers through the ice with a climbing-bolt gun, and is rescued by Hal.

Jessie signals to the rescue helicopter, believing it to be Frank, and is taken hostage by Qualen, who demands that Walker and Hal surrender the money. Meeting high atop the cliffs, Qualen frees Jessie, but Walker throws the bag of money into the helicopter's rotor blades, shredding the cash, and tethers the helicopter's winch cable to a cliffside ladder. Hal helps shoot down the helicopter, which hangs over the cliff with Walker and Qualen atop the wreckage. Walker fights off Qualen and climbs to safety as the wreckage falls off the cliff, killing Qualen. The authorities arrive as Walker reunites with Jessie and Hal.

== Cast ==
- Sylvester Stallone as Ranger Gabe Walker, a former mountain ranger haunted by his failure to save the girlfriend of his former best friend
- John Lithgow as Eric Qualen, a psychopathic former British military intelligence officer, now leader of a gang of thieves trying to rob $100 million from the U.S. Treasury. Lithgow was originally cast as the film's secondary villain, but was promoted after Christopher Walken left the film.
- Michael Rooker as Ranger Hal Tucker, Gabe's best friend and a mountain ranger who blames Gabe for failing to save his girlfriend from a fatal fall
- Janine Turner as Ranger Jessie Deighan, a helicopter pilot and Gabe's girlfriend, working in the same mountain search-and-rescue group
- Rex Linn as Richard Travers, a U.S. Treasury agent and a double agent working for Qualen
- Caroline Goodall as Kristel, Qualen's pilot and companion
- Leon Robinson as Kynette, Qualen's brutal henchman
- Craig Fairbrass as Delmar, Qualen's sadistic British ex-soccer player-turned-henchman.
- Gregory Scott Cummins as Ryan, Qualen's henchman
- Denis Forest as Heldon, Qualen's henchman
- Michelle Joyner as Sarah, Hal's ill-fated girlfriend who falls to her death after Gabe fails to save her
- Paul Winfield as Walter Wright, a U.S. Treasury agent and Travers' superior who discovered Qualen's plot to rob the money from the U.S. Treasury
- Ralph Waite as Ranger Frank, a search-and-rescue pilot working for Gabe, Jessie and Hal
- Max Perlich as Evan, a thrill-seeking young man who is friends with Gabe and Hal
- Trey Brownell as Brett, Evan's friend who is also a thrill-seeker
- Vyto Ruginis as Matheson, an undercover FBI agent
- John Finn as FBI Agent Michaels
- Bruce McGill as Treasury Agent
- Zach Grenier as Davis, Wright's assistant
- Jeff McCarthy as the pilot
- Wolfgang Güllich as Gabe Walker (stunt double)

== Production ==
=== Development and writing ===
Carolco Pictures had originally signed Sylvester Stallone to appear opposite John Candy in a comedy about feuding neighbors titled Bartholomew vs. Neff, which was going to be written and directed by John Hughes. When that project was dropped, Stallone became involved in two other Carolco projects.

The first one was the futuristic science-fiction horror film Isobar, which was about a genetically-created monster who breaks free on a high-speed runaway train: between 1987, when Carolco first bought the original script by Jim Uhls for $400,000, and 1991, directors Ridley Scott and Roland Emmerich were each at different points in time attached to direct the film which would have had a $90 million budget with Stallone and Kim Basinger playing the main roles; however, due to disagreements between them and Carolco and producer Joel Silver about the script changes and lack of artistic freedom, both Scott and Emmerich gave up on the project, which in the end was cancelled.

The second Carolco project in which Stallone was involved was an action disaster thriller entitled Gale Force, described as "Die Hard in a hurricane", which Renny Harlin was going to direct, and in which Stallone would play an ex-Navy SEAL who has to fight against a group of modern pirates who attack a coastal town during a large, catastrophic hurricane. The first version of the script for the film was written by David Chappe in 1984, who then wrote six more drafts between 1987 and 1989, and after his final draft received some praise and following the bidding war between several studios for it in 1989, Carolco bought his final draft for $500,000, with a promise of an additional $200,000 if the movie were made. Harlin was paid $3 million for directing the film, but because his contract also gave him full control of the project, he demanded many re-writes of the script to, amongst other things, increase the number of action sequences and make them bigger. Between 1990 and 1991 while they were working on the project, Carolco spent over $4 million on all the different screenwriters and versions of the script. One of the screenwriters who worked on it, Joe Eszterhas, was paid $500,000 to write his version. He re-wrote it as an erotic thriller, similar to his previous screenplays, so it was rejected.

Carolco, believing the intended $40 million budget would be too big, and unable to figure out how to make special effects for the film, cancelled that project two weeks before production was supposed to begin; but Harlin still kept his $3 million, and he and Stallone and everyone else involved in it then moved on to Cliffhanger, another Carolco project, which had a budget of $70 million, almost double that of Gale Force.

Harlin wanted David Bowie and Bryan Ferry for the role of Eric Qualen, but scheduling problems prevented Bowie from taking it, and the role eventually went to John Lithgow. Reviewers have suggested that the 1956 dramatic film The Mountain provided some of the inspiration for Cliffhanger, which has multiple similarities. Before production began, Stallone rewrote Michael France's script: his work changed the film significantly enough that Carolco petitioned the Writers Guild of America for him to get credit.

Half of the film's budget was provided by TriStar Pictures in exchange for distribution rights in North America, Mexico, Australia, New Zealand, Germany and France. Seed funding was provided by Carolco shareholders Rizzoli-Corriere della Sera, Le Studio Canal+, and Pioneer Electric Corporation. The balance of the production costs were obtained through a production loan provided by a syndicate of banks led by Credit Lyonnais Bank Nederland (CLBN). The credit of US$46,553,000 was, at the time, one of the largest project loan facilities ever to be made for the production of an independent film, and was fully repaid from the movie’s distribution proceeds.

The financing arrangement was the result of Carolco's serious debt issues, and as a result, Carolco would ultimately receive very little of the box office gross. During principal photography, production was shut down twice when Carolco could not afford to pay the crew; the movie went $40 million over budget. Stallone reportedly had to forego $2 million of his $15 million salary as a result.

=== Filming ===
The large majority of the film's scenes were shot in the Dolomites in Cortina d'Ampezzo, Italy. For example, the bridge scene was shot on Monte Cristallo in the via ferrata VF Ivano Dibona, which was reconstructed immediately after the movie. The climbing was mostly on the Tofane cliffs, and in some scenes toward the end of the movie the audience clearly sees the three Tofane, the Croda da Lago and the town of Cortina; the location of this is on top of Mount Faloria, at the arrival of the funivia Faloria. In other scenes are the sentiero ferrato Astaldi, over the Rifugio Dibona. The small house has been constructed on the sand of the river Boite, in Fiames, close to the heliport. Some filming took place in Durango, Colorado. The credits of the film also thank the Ute Tribe for filming in the Ute Mountain reservation.

Cliffhanger is in the Guinness Book of World Records for the costliest aerial stunt ever performed. Stuntman Simon Crane was paid $1 million to perform the aerial transfer scene, where he crossed between two planes at an altitude of 15,000 feet (4,600 m). The principal climbing doubles were Ron Kauk and Wolfgang Güllich. Kauk performed as Stallone's climbing double after Güllich died in a car accident in 1992. The doubles filled in for Stallone on most of the climbing scenes due to the actor's fear of heights; an injury to Stallone's hand, reported to have occurred on one of the cliffs, actually occurred on a soundstage.

When asked about the director's cut, Stallone explained that "the director's cut was met with a lot of disapproval at the screening and received some alarmingly low scores. Mainly because the stunts were absurdly overblown. For example, the average man can jump maybe twelve feet across a gorge, and the stunts had me leaping maybe three hundred feet or more, so situations like that had to be pared down and still then were fairly extreme...so you're probably better off with this cut. By the way, the second unit crew that filmed the majority of the action was extraordinary."

== Music ==
Cliffhanger: Original Motion Picture Soundtrack

Studio album by Trevor Jones
- Released: 23 May 1993
- Recorded: Cine-Tele Sound (CTS) Studios, Wembley, United Kingdom
- Genres: Stage & Screen
- Length: 42:18
- Label: Scotti Bros. Records 514 455-2
- Producer: Trevor Jones

Trevor Jones chronology
The Last of the Mohicans (1992)	Cliffhanger: Original Motion Picture Soundtrack (1993)	Death Train (1993)

Professional ratings
Review scores
Source	Rating
AllMusic	3.5/5 stars

The orchestral score to Cliffhanger was composed by film score veteran Trevor Jones with the National Philharmonic Orchestra. In his review for the Cliffhanger soundtrack, Filmtracks reviewer Christian Clemmensen mentioned its similarities to Jones' previous work on The Last of the Mohicans, stating: "with Cliffhanger would come a title theme strikingly similar to that of Last of the Mohicans, possibly too reminiscent in fact for some listeners to tolerate." However, his review was still positive, giving the Cliffhanger score four out of a possible five stars, concluding, "No matter your view of whether or not composers should recycle their own material, Jones' main identity for Cliffhanger stands on its own as a remarkable piece, and an often enjoyable action underscore will maintain your interest in between the theme's statements." The soundtrack has been released twice; through Scotti Bros./BMG Music on 23 May 1993 and an extended version through Intrada Records on 21 February 2011.

== Release ==
=== Cut version ===
For its British cinema release, the film was cut by over a minute, then by a further 16 seconds on video and DVD to gain a '15' certificate. Chief victim was the scene in which Delmar (Craig Fairbrass) beats up Hal Tucker (Michael Rooker), but other cuts included aggressive strong language and other moments of violence. However, the 2008 DVD release was given a '15' with no cuts made.

=== Home media ===
Cliffhanger was released on VHS for rental in the United States in December 1993. It was released on DVD on November 26, 1997 and re-released for the Collector's Edition on June 13, 2000 by Columbia TriStar Home Video. As such, it is the only Carolco film that is not owned by Lionsgate Home Entertainment, and is instead owned by Sony Pictures in North America. The film on Blu-ray was released first in United Kingdom on August 4, 2008, Australia and Mexico in 2009 by Optimum Home Entertainment and Universal Studios Home Entertainment under the StudioCanal banner, and in the United States on January 12, 2010, and on 4K UltraHD Blu-ray on 15 January 2019. The film was re-released on Blu-ray in Australia and United Kingdom only from 2018 to 2019 for the film's 25th anniversary under the Classics Remastered and Brand New Restoration. The film was re-released with Last Action Hero on a Blu-ray 2-Movie Collection on November 2, 2021.

== Reception ==
=== Box office ===
Cliffhanger grossed $20.5 million during its opening weekend, ranking in first place at the box office ahead of Sliver, Super Mario Bros., Made in America and Dave. The film was a box office hit grossing $255 million worldwide. The film grossed $84 million in the United States and Canada, $14 million in the United Kingdom and $13 million in Germany. It spent 11 consecutive weeks at the top of the Japanese box office.

=== Critical response ===
On Rotten Tomatoes, Cliffhanger has an approval rating of 67% based on 57 reviews. The website's critical consensus reads, "While it can't escape comparisons to the movies it borrows from, Cliffhanger is a tense, action-packed thriller and a showcase for the talents that made Sylvester Stallone a star." On Metacritic, the film has a score of 59 out of 100 based on reviews from 16 critics. Audiences polled by CinemaScore gave the film an average grade of "B" on an A+ to F scale.

The film was screened out of competition at the 1993 Cannes Film Festival. It was nominated for three Academy Awards: Best Sound (Michael Minkler, Bob Beemer and Tim Cooney), Best Sound Effects Editing (Gregg Baxter), and Best Visual Effects (Neil Krepela, John Richardson, John Bruno, and Pamela Easley), all losing to Jurassic Park at the 66th Academy Awards. Cliffhanger was also nominated for Worst Picture, Worst Supporting Actor (John Lithgow), Worst Supporting Actress (Janine Turner) and Worst Screenplay at the 14th Golden Raspberry Awards.

In his review in the Chicago Sun-Times, Roger Ebert gave the film 3 out of 4 stars. On At the Movies, Ebert's colleague Gene Siskel said Cliffhanger was "filled with howlingly bad scenes" and that the "villains are dull and Stallone and his fellow climbers are even worse." Ebert disagreed, calling the mountain climbing action "truly sensational," which Siskel dismissed as flashy stunt work in service of a bad screenplay. Other criticisms were of Lithgow's inauthentic English accent, and the film's unrealistic portrayal of mountaineering, including the fictional gun which fires pitons directly into rock. In 2025, The Hollywood Reporter listed Cliffhanger as having the best stunts of 1993.

== Other media ==
=== Novelization ===
A novelization by Jeff Rovin based on the film, titled Cliffhanger, was released in 1993.

=== Video game ===
A video game based on the film Cliffhanger was released via numerous game consoles on November 17, 1993.

== Cancelled sequel ==
In 1994, TriStar announced plans to develop a sequel titled Cliffhanger 2: The Dam, with Stallone reprising his starring role. The plot revolved around Gabe Walker combating terrorists who took control of the Hoover Dam. The project remained in development hell until 2008, when the project was revived with Stallone's involvement, before once again being shelved. By May 2009, it was announced that a reimagining was in development. Produced by Neal H. Moritz the project would be a joint-production between Original Film and StudioCanal. The story would focus around a group of young climbers, and was tentatively scheduled to begin principal photography the following year. Moritz stated that his intent is to adapt the story in a similar manner comparable to J.J. Abrams' work on Star Trek. By May 2014, Joe Gazzam was hired as screenwriter after pitching his approach to the story to Moritz who was impressed. By May 2015, Stallone expressed interest in developing a direct sequel to the original film. In May 2019, the project developed into a female-led adaptation. Ana Lily Amirpour was hired as director, with a new draft of the script written by Sascha Penn. Jason Momoa was in early negotiations to feature in a prominent cameo role; while Mortiz brought on Toby Jaffe, Thorsten Schumacher and Lars Sylvest as additional producers. The story was described as a survival thriller action movie, with elements of espionage. An official production poster was released for the project's presence at the 2019 Cannes Film Festival, with a tentative commencement for principal photography was set for 2020. Moritz stated that there are plans for more than one installment to be made.

In May 2023, it was officially announced that the project will be redeveloped as a legacy sequel. Ric Roman Waugh will serve as director (replacing Amirpour), from a new script written by Mark Bianculli. Stallone will reprise his role from the original, in addition to taking on a role as producer. The plot will detail the continued adventures of climber-turned-rescue ranger Gabriel "Gabe" Walker alongside a supporting cast, and include the Italian Alps. Casting underway for additional ensemble lead and supporting roles. Waugh expressed excitement for the challenge of working with Stallone, stating: "Growing up with the biggest action films of the '80s and '90s, ...Cliffhanger was by far one of my favorite spectacles. To be at the helm of the next chapter, ...with the legend himself...is a dream come true. It's going to be a great challenge and blast taking this franchise to new heights, a responsibility I don't take lightly." Moritz, Jaffe, Schumacher, Sylvest and Braden Aftergood will serve as additional producers. The project will be a joint-venture production between Original Film, Balboa Productions, StudioCanal, Rocket Science Films, Wright Productions & Entertainment and Front Row Entertainment. The movie had a presence at the 2023 Cannes Film Festival, where additional funding and distribution would be decided. In December of the same year, it was announced that Jean-François Richet had replaced Waugh as director; while additional film studios joined the project including FilmFernsehFonds Bayern, Black Magic Films, Supernix, Maze Pictures and Occupant Entertainment. Philipp Kreuzer and Joe Neurauter will serve as additional producers, while principal photography was scheduled to commence in the summer of 2024.

== Reboot ==
In October 2024, it was reported that a creative overhaul turned the proposed Cliffhanger sequel into a reboot, with Stallone no longer involved with the project. Lily James was cast in the lead role, alongside Pierce Brosnan, Nell Tiger Free, Franz Rogowski, Shubham Saraf, Assaad Bouab, Suzy Bemba and Bruno Gouery. Principal photography began on October 31 in Austria. The film was scheduled to be released on August 28, 2026, but was pushed back to February 24, 2027.

== See also ==
- Survival film
