= Aïssatou Diallo Sagna =

French actress (born 1983)

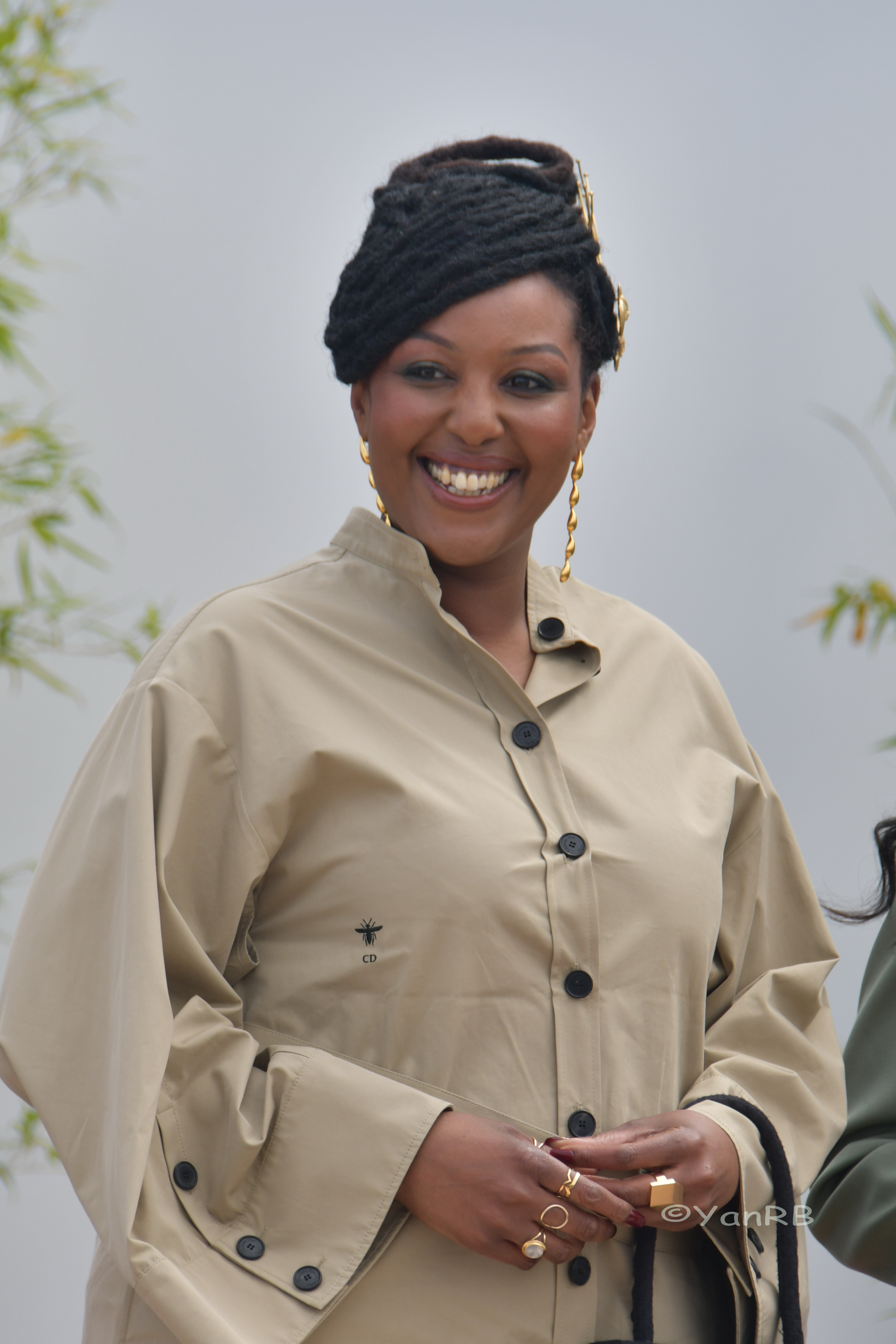
- Diallo Sagna at the 2023 Cannes Film Festival
- Born: 1983 (age 42–43)
- Occupation: Actress
- Years active: 2021–present

Aïssatou Diallo Sagna (born 1983) is a French actress. In 2022, she received the César Award for Best Supporting Actress for her performance in The Divide.

== Early life ==
Of Guinean origin, Aïssatou Diallo Sagna grew up in Seine-et-Marne.

== Career ==
Diallo Sagna worked from 2004 as an agente des services hospitaliers (ASH) at the Hôpital Saint-Joseph in Paris. She obtained a brevet d'études professionnelles (BEP) in health and social care, and a baccalauréat sciences médico-sociales. She has been working as a hospital orderly (aide-soignante) since 2013. She continues to exercise her profession as a hospital orderly, stating that she "can continue [her] profession and also film" and maintaining that "it is not incompatible". She works at the Hôpital privé des Peupliers in Paris.

In 2020, while the production of Catherine Corsini feature film The Divide was searching for health professionals as extras, Diallo Sagna's colleagues pushed her to participate in the casting. She was selected for the role of the nurse Kim in Corsini's film. She was invited to attend the 2021 Cannes Film Festival, where the film was presented in competition. In February 2022, she received the award for Best Supporting Actress at the 47th César Awards. Diallo Sagna was also cast in Corsini's next work, Homecoming, about a caregiver who travels to Corsica.

== Personal life ==
Diallo Sagna is married and has three children.

== Filmography ==
Year	Title	Role	Notes
2021	The Divide	Kim	
2023	Homecoming	Khédidja	
2023	A Difficult Year	Nurse 1	
2023	La Fiancée du poète	Aminata	
2024	My Everything	Séverine	
2024	Belle		
2026	N121 - Bus de nuit	Aminata	

== Accolades ==
Award	Date of ceremony	Category	Title	Result	Ref.
César Awards	25 February 2022	Best Supporting Actress	The Divide	Won	
Lumière Awards	17 January 2022	Best Female Revelation	The Divide	Nominated	
