= Agathe Rousselle =

French actress (born 1988)

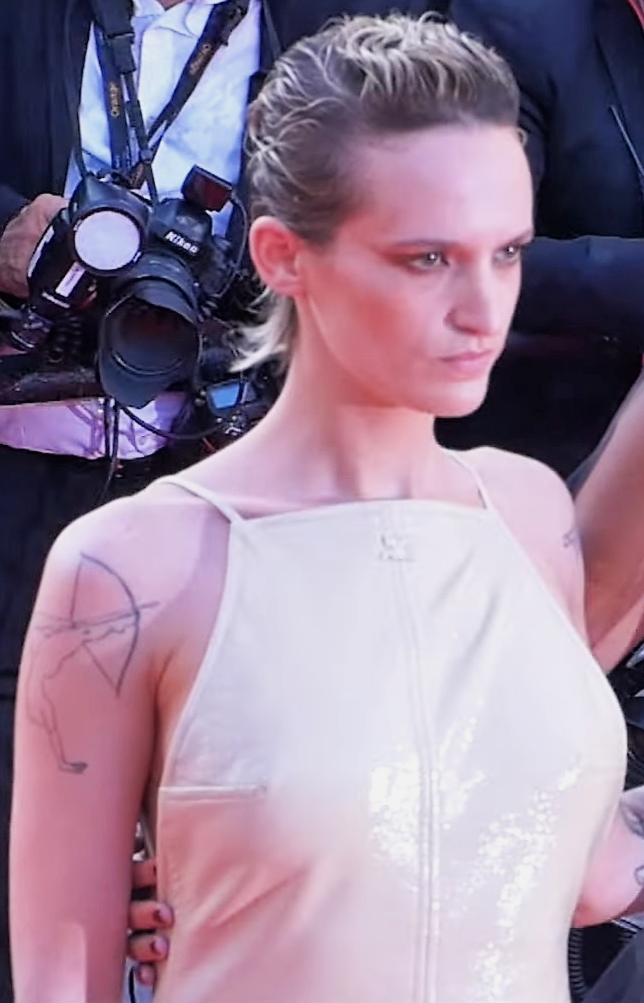
- Rousselle at the 2021 Cannes Film Festival closing ceremony
- Born: 14 June 1988 (age 38)
- Occupations: Journalist; actress; model
- Spouse: Tim Presley

Agathe Rousselle (French: [aɡat ʁusɛl]; born 14 June 1988) is a French journalist, model, and actress. She is the co-founder of feminist magazine Peach and a custom embroidery company Cheeky Boom. She is also known for her lead performance as Alexia in the film Titane, which won the Palme d'Or at the 2021 Cannes Film Festival.

== Career ==
=== Journalism career ===
Rousselle began her career as a journalist and editor. In 2016, she participated in the creation of General Pop, a cultural web magazine dedicated to emerging cultures. The same year, she co-founded the feminist magazine Peach with the actress and singer Tifenn-Tiana Fournereau. This magazine, created by women, highlights female artists and creators, in reaction to the lack of exclusively female artistic collectives in France. The review was launched on 22 September at the TDTF3 bar in Paris. The magazine wishes to set itself apart from the traditional women's press while targeting both a female and male audience. It also advocates inclusiveness, appealing for its realization to trans and non-binary people who are often marginalized in the professional world.

=== Fashion and entrepreneurship ===
Passionate about embroidery, which she practices as a hobby, Rousselle created the company Cheeky Boom in 2012 with her boyfriend at the time, Jean André de Trémontels, a freelance graphic designer. Cheeky Boom sells T-shirts and panties that are embellished with designed embroidery. In 2015, Rousselle became captain of a running team called Boost Pigalle, sponsored by sports equipment manufacturer Adidas. She is also a photographer and model.

=== Acting career ===
Rousselle took drama class from age 15 to age 22. She began her acting career with minor roles and short appearances in feature films. In 2015, she played the leading role in 5 vagues de l'avenir, a short film by Laurent Perreau. In 2021, she made her feature film debut in the lead role of Alexia in Titane, directed by Julia Ducournau. Rousselle plays Alexia, a serial killer who has an unusual sexual desire for cars. Following the film's premiere at the Cannes Film Festival, where it won the Palme d'Or, The New York Times called the film "one of the weirdest prizewinners of the year".

Rousselle will perform the role of Blake in Oliver Leith's opera Last Days, adapted from the Gus Van Sant film of the same name, at the Royal Opera House.

== Filmography ==
=== Film ===
Year	Title	Role	Note
2013	La voix de Kate Moss		Short film
2015	5 vagues de l'avenir	Young woman from the 5th wave	Documentary short film
2019	Looking for the Self		Short film
2021	Loving		Short film
2021	Titane	Alexia/Adrien	
2023	Gold Brick		
2023	Stranger		Short film
2024	How to Make Gravy	Rita	Based on the song of the same name by Paul Kelly
2025	A Second Life	Elisabeth	

== Awards and nominations ==
Year	Association	Category	Work	Result
2021	Atlanta Film Critics Circle	Breakthrough Performance	Titane	Won
2021	Chicago Film Critics Association	Best Actress	Titane	Nominated
2021	Detroit Film Critics Society	Breakthrough Performance	Titane	Nominated
2021	DiscussingFilm Critic Awards	Best Actress	Titane	Runner-up
2021	DiscussingFilm Critic Awards	Best Debut Performance	Titane	Won
2021	European Film Awards	Best Actress	Titane	Nominated
2021	Greater Western New York Film Critics Association	Breakthrough Performance	Titane	Nominated
2021	Online Association of Female Film Critics	Best Female Lead	Titane	Nominated
2021	Online Association of Female Film Critics	Breakthrough Performance	Titane	Won
2021	Philadelphia Film Critics Circle	Best Actress	Titane	Runner-up
2021	Philadelphia Film Critics Circle	Best Breakthrough Performance	Titane	Won
2022	Alliance of Women Film Journalists	EDA Special Mention Award for Most Daring Performance	Titane	Won
2022	Austin Film Critics Association	Best Actress	Titane	Won
2022	Austin Film Critics Association	Breakthrough Artist	Titane	Nominated
2022	César Awards	Most Promising Actress	Titane	Nominated
2022	Critics' Choice Super Awards	Best Actress in a Horror Movie	Titane	Won
2022	Georgia Film Critics Association	Best Actress	Titane	Nominated
2022	Georgia Film Critics Association	Breakthrough Award	Titane	Nominated
2022	International Cinephile Society	Breakthrough Performance	Titane	Nominated
2022	Lumière Awards	Best Female Revelation	Titane	Won
2022	North Dakota Film Critics	Best Actress	Titane	Nominated
2022	Online Film Critics Society	Best Actress	Titane	Nominated
2022	Seattle Film Critics Society	Best Actress in a Leading Role	Titane	Nominated
