= Kandisha =

Kandisha may refer to:

- Kandisha (2008 film), a Moroccan horror film
- Kandisha (2020 film), a French horror film
