= Sandor Funtek =

French actor

Sandor Funtek (French: [ʃɑ̃dɔʁ fyntɛk]; born 25 April 1990) is a French actor.

His Hungarian father, Frigyes Funtek, and his French mother, Dorine Hollier, are both actors.

His first lead role was in K contraire (originally L'enkas or The Truk; 2019).

== Roles ==
=== Film ===
- 2013 : Blue is the Warmest Colour : Valentin
- 2013 : Rôdeurs : (voice)
- 2014 : Jennah
- 2015 : L'Homme au lion : the young man
- 2015 : Dheepan : the guardian
- 2015 : 8 Coups : Tom
- 2015 : Une famille : Samir
- 2016 : A Wedding : Frank
- 2016 : Zin'naariya! : Sandor
- 2016 : DeadBoy : Enzo
- 2016 : Les Derniers Parisiens : Milord
- 2017 : Nico, 1988 : Ari
- 2017 : Rikishi
- 2018 : Les Affamés : Kéké
- 2018 : Tumultueuses : Liam
- 2019 : Nos vies formidables : Dylan
- 2019 : Une jeunesse sauvage : Andy
- 2019 : Adoration
- 2020 : K contraire : Ulysse Fravielle
- 2020 : Kandisha : Erwan
- 2020 : Suprêmes : Kool Shen
