= Last Days (opera) =

2022 opera by Oliver Leith

- Opera by Oliver Leith
- Librettist: Matt Copson
- Based on: Last Days by Gus Van Sant
- Premiere: 2022; Linbury Theatre, Royal Opera House

Last Days is a 2022 English-language opera in one act, with music by Oliver Leith and libretto by Matt Copson. It was directed by Copson and Anna Morrisey. The title and concept for the opera were taken from the 2005 film of the same name by Gus Van Sant, which was a fictionalised account of the last days of Kurt Cobain.

== Background and synopsis ==
Last Days is Leith's first opera, and librettist Copson had also never worked on an opera previously. The opera's libretto and plot are largely based on the 2005 film Last Days. Leith stated he was drawn to the film because of its sound design, in which mundane sounds are raised to the same volume as characters' dialogue. An example of this is the sound of cereal being poured into a bowl, which also featured in the opera. In the opera, the only explicit reference to Kurt Cobain is a guitar riff reminiscent of Nirvana.

The opera was "extravagantly costumed" by Balenciaga. Librettist Copson, who is more commonly a visual artist, had worked with the fashion house on a previous project. This was the first collaboration of the Royal Opera House with a fashion company since Jonathan Miller's Così fan tutte in collaboration with Giorgio Armani or the loan of jewels by Van Cleef & Arpels for Angela Gheorghiu's Tosca.

The opera tells the story of Blake, a musician who has just left rehab and is under pressure to return to touring. Blake's suicide is described as being the subject matter of the opera, despite occurring at the end. A shotgun is introduced on to the stage early in the opera, and remains until it is used by Blake to end his own life. The Guardian describes the rest of the cast as "hangers-on" causing "chaos" around Blake.

== Roles ==
Agathe Rousselle, who portrayed the lead character in the premiere, had never attended an opera before being cast as Blake. Leith and Copson took her to a performance of Salome which she "hated", saying "it's not my thing".

== Performance history and reception ==
The opera was first performed at the Linbury Theatre in 2022. It was a joint production between the Royal Opera House and the Guildhall School of Music and Drama.

The opera was met with universal acclaim. In a 5-star review for The Independent, Michael Church described the piece as "extraordinary" and a work "full of mysteries". Richard Morrison for The Times called it “unhinged, unearthly and occasionally sublime.” whilst Nick Kimberley for The Evening Standard described the piece as "exemplary" saying "almost nothing happens but always with an almost hallucinatory intensity.” In a 4-star review for The Guardian, Andrew Clements stated that there was limited characterisation in the "bleak" opera. In a 4-star review for the Financial Times, Richard Fairman stated that the score has "no hint of Nirvana about it" and that the opera "worms its way into one's mind".

Last Days received its U.S premiere on 6 February 2024 in a one-night production at the Walt Disney Concert Hall in Los Angeles. Agathe Rouselle reprised her role as Blake.

== Kurt Cobain estate accusation ==
After the premiere of the opera, Kurt Cobain's estate criticised the Royal Opera House, saying: "Sadly, it is an unauthorised attempt that seeks to profit and benefit from a brief meeting that took place thirty years ago". In response, the Royal Opera House said "The Royal Opera's production of Last Days is adapted from Gus Van Sant’s cult film of the same name, released in 2005. It is a fictionalised account, and was produced with the permissions of Gus Van Sant and HBO."
