= Suzy Bemba =

French actress (born 2000)

- Born: 22 June 2000 (age 26); Martigues, Bouches-du-Rhône, France
- Occupation: Actress
- Years active: 2020–present
- Known for: Poor Things (2023); Homecoming (2023); Kandisha (2020)

Suzy Bemba (French: [syzi bɛmba]; born 22 June 2000 in Martigues) is a French actress known for her appearances in Poor Things, Homecoming, and Kandisha. In January 2024, she was featured on Unifrance's 10 to Watch. She was also included in the European Shooting Stars programme at the 2024 Berlin International Film Festival.

She founded the Actors Association (ADA), a professional support group aiming to combat harassment and improve on-set protection for French actors.

Bemba is studying medicine alongside her acting career.

In 2026, Bemba served on the jury of the Biarritz Film Festival – Nouvelles Vagues, presided over by Kristen Stewart.

== Filmography ==
=== Film ===
Year	Title	Role	Director	Ref.
2020	Kandisha	Bintou	Alexandre Bustillo	
2023	Homecoming	Jessica	Catherine Corsini	
2023	Ma France à Moi	Lily	Benoit Cohen	
2023	Poor Things	Toinette	Yorgos Lanthimos	
2025	A Second Life		Laurent Slama	
2027	Cliffhanger	TBA	Jaume Collet-Serra	

=== Television ===
Year	Title	Role	Notes	Ref.
2021	L'Opéra	Flora	16 Episodes	
2023	Everything is Well	Alice	5 Episodes	
2024	Loups-Garous	Herself	Contestant	
