= Homecoming (2023 film) =

2023 drama film

- Release poster
- French: Le Retour
- Directed by: Catherine Corsini
- Written by: Catherine Corsini; Naïla Guiguet
- Produced by: Élisabeth Perez
- Starring: Aïssatou Diallo Sagna; Suzy Bemba; Esther Gohourou
- Cinematography: Jeanne Lapoirie
- Edited by: Frédéric Baillehaiche
- Production companies: Chaz Productions; Le Pacte; France 3 Cinéma
- Distributed by: Le Pacte
- Release dates: 17 May 2023 (Cannes); 12 July 2023 (France)
- Running time: 110 minutes
- Country: France
- Language: French
- Budget: €4.7 million
- Box office: $233,401

Homecoming (French: Le Retour) is a 2023 French drama film co-written and directed by Catherine Corsini. It is a family drama about a woman who returns to Corsica with her two teenage daughters for the summer, starring Aïssatou Diallo Sagna, Suzy Bemba and Esther Gohourou.

The film had its world premiere in the main competition of the 76th Cannes Film Festival on 17 May 2023, where it was nominated for the Palme d'Or. It was theatrically released in France on 12 July 2023 by Le Pacte.

Before its release the film generated a controversy for filming a simulated manual sex scene (cut from the film) involving underage actors without declaration to authorities, as well as allegations of sexual assault and poor working conditions on set.

== Synopsis ==
Khédidja, a woman of African origin, travels to Corsica to take care of the children of a wealthy Parisian family for the summer. Her daughters, Jessica and Farah, accompany her. It is an opportunity for the family to rediscover the island which they left fifteen years ago following a tragedy.

== Cast ==
- Aïssatou Diallo Sagna as Khédidja
- Suzy Bemba as Jessica
- Esther Gohourou as Farah
- Lomane de Dietrich as Gaïa
- Harold Orsoni as Orso
- Cédric Appietto as Marc-Andria
- Marie-Ange Geronimi as Michelle
- Virginie Ledoyen as Sylvia
- Denis Podalydès as Marc

== Production ==
Homecoming was written by Catherine Corsini and Naïla Guiguet. It was produced by Élisabeth Perez for Chaz Productions, and co-produced by Le Pacte and France 3 Cinéma. Jeanne Lapoirie served as director of photography, and Frédéric Baillehaiche as editor.

Filming took place between 14 September and 8 November 2022, in Corsica, near L'Île-Rousse and Castifao, the village of origin of the family of Catherine Corsini.

== Release ==
Homecoming was selected to compete for the Palme d'Or at the 2023 Cannes Film Festival, where it had its world premiere on 17 May 2023. Even though the festival had decided to include the film before the first lineup was revealed on 13 April, the selection was not announced until 24 April, as it reviewed the allegations of impropriety surrounding the film. According to Le Parisien, the festival received letters—one signed by 17 crew members attesting that only the actors' faces were filmed and they were under no constraint during the intimate scene, one signed by 42 crew members denying any harassment by Corsini, and others from actors Denis Podalydès, Esther Gohourou, Aïssatou Diallo Sagna, and Cédric Appietto. A festival spokesperson said, "since the research revealed nothing but a violent campaign of denigration, the board of directors decided, with supporting documents, to maintain its invitation of the film".

The film was released in French cinemas by Le Pacte on 12 July 2023. International sales is handled by Playtime.

== Reception ==
=== Critical response ===
On Rotten Tomatoes, the film holds an approval rating of 69% based on 13 reviews, with an average rating of 5.5/10. On Metacritic, the film has a weighted average score of 63 out of 100, based on 8 critic reviews, indicating "generally favorable" reviews. Homecoming received an average rating of 3.0 out of 5 stars on the French website AlloCiné, based on 29 reviews.

Reviewing the film following its Cannes premiere, Peter Bradshaw of The Guardian praised the "very strong" performances but criticised the "melodramatic incidental action" for making the film fail to deliver on its "tacit promise of showing us Khedidja's inner life, and what this place and her homecoming means to her."

=== Accolades ===
Award	Date of ceremony	Category	Recipient(s)	Result	Ref.
Cannes Film Festival	26 May 2023	Queer Palm	Catherine Corsini	Nominated	
Cannes Film Festival	27 May 2023	Palme d'Or	Catherine Corsini	Nominated	
Gijón International Film Festival	25 November 2023	Albar Competition – Best Feature Film	Catherine Corsini	Nominated	

== Allegations of on-set misconduct ==
Allegations of misconduct on the set of Homecoming were first reported on 15 April 2023 by Le Parisien. On 19 April, Libération published a report detailing further allegations. On 27 July 2023, Mediapart published a report, including testimonies of public officials and crew members and attaching documents of responses from Corsini and Perez.

=== Undeclared scene ===
When minors under the age of 15 participate in filming in France, the screenplay is sent for validation to the prefect and the Commission des Enfants du Spectacle, which oversees the safeguarding of minors on film sets. However, the production team introduced a scene in which a female character, played by Esther Gohourou, caresses a male character, played by Harold Orsini. The actors were aged 15 and 17, respectively. The scene was not included in the validated screenplay and was therefore unauthorised. Following this violation of the law, the government agency Centre national du cinéma et de l'image animée (CNC) withdrew its financial support of €580,000, minus the minimum sum paid to the cast and crew, out of an overall budget of €4.7 million. The CNC later reduced the fine to €330,000.

Perez said her company made an administrative error by not declaring the scene, which she said was "played in a totally consented and fully simulated manner" with only the actors' faces filmed and without actual touching. Corsini said, "I wanted to capture with this small sequence between these two young actors, the awkwardness of the first emotions of love ... it suggested something of a sexual nature, but we didn't show anything since the camera was centered on the faces." Corsini said that she "took every necessary precaution to film that scene" and offered the actors an intimacy coordinator for the scene but that "since they were dressed and didn't touch each other, and since they trusted each other, they decided that it wasn't necessary". Gohourou has released a statement corroborating that they declined an intimacy coordinator. Corsini and Perez stated that body doubles were also offered but declined by the actors.

Corsini said she cut the scene during editing, at the request of France 3 who considered it unnecessary, and "to calm everyone down and especially so that people would stop bothering the actors".

=== Sexual assault allegations ===
During the production, a complaint was filed with the Central Committee on Health and Safety and Working Conditions of Film Production (CCHSCT) accusing Corsini of harassment, and two other crew members of "inappropriate gestures" towards two actresses. The CCHSCT visited the set and made a report to the prosecutor. According to Corsini and Perez, the CCHSCT found no wrongdoing.

On 3 October 2022, a young actress originally cast to play Jessica filed a police complaint alleging that, on 24 August 2022, during the rehearsal of a dance scene, a coach grabbed her "by the hips" and rubbed "his genitals against hers by initiating vigorous back-and-forth movements", and that she was fired after telling Corsini about the incident. According to Libération, the coach was not fired but only asked to obtain permission from anyone before making any physical contact with them after the incident. According to Mediapart, after the firing, Chaz Productions offered the actress a compensation of €2,500 in exchange for promising not to speak publicly against the company or Corsini, which she declined. Corsini said that the recasting of the actress had nothing to do with the complaint and it was only because she was not "a good match for this role, as it can often happen during the early days of rehearsals".

On set, Gohourou accused a stuntman of touching her buttocks repeatedly during a scene in which she was pressed against a wall. Perez and Corsini conducted an internal investigation, which found it inconclusive. Since Gohourou was a minor, it was also reported to the prosecutor. A social worker then interviewed Gohourou and her mother, who decided not to press charges.

=== Working conditions ===
Libération reported that, despite the production taking place during the school term, Gohourou was not accompanied by a parent or guardian, and was not subject to an educational follow-up. The film's COVID-19 specialist, who had been assigned this task, quit during the filming, opposed to the conditions of filming of the minor. It also reported that a casting assistant in charge of extras, a grip, and the second assistant director also resigned mid-production "due to repeated humiliations". It also reported that a letter signed by 16 crew members and two actresses—Lomane de Dietrich and Suzy Bemba according to Mediapart—complaining about working conditions was read to Corsini ten days before the end of the filming, and that the actresses' scenes were reduced in retaliation. Corsini refuted this and said that scenes were cut in order to reduce working hours in response to the complaint.

According to Libération, two actresses requested, without success, the presence of an intimacy coordinator on the set.

=== Filmmakers' response ===
On 25 April 2023, Corsini and Perez published an open letter stating, "Anonymous and defamatory emails have been sent to the profession and the press, generating a rumor that was very damaging for the film." They acknowledged they made an administrative error by not declaring an intimate scene, but stressed that the actors were clothed and only their faces were filmed. They said internal investigations were conducted into the two incidents of alleged sexual misconduct and the CCHSCT "could see it had been dealt with correctly".

Testimonies of actors Esther Gohourou and Denis Podalydès denying poor working conditions were attached to the letter. Gohourou said she and Orsoni declined an intimacy coordinator and the shooting of the undeclared scene was not uncomfortable. Podalydès said, "I've participated in over one hundred shoots, and I know what it means to be on a set riven with disagreements, things left unsaid and harassment. ... At no point during my time on the set [of Homecoming] did I witness a problem or feel ill at ease, quite the contrary."

=== Distributor's response ===
On 28 June 2023, Jean Labadie, CEO of Le Pacte, the French distributor of Homecoming, sent out a press release criticising the French press for failing to conduct a proper investigation and disseminating "unfounded, unjust and defamatory" allegations. In response, Libération published an editor's note defending its reporting. Labadie also accused the CNC of pressuring the filmmakers to cut the undeclared scene, which the CNC denied in a statement released on 29 June. He also revealed that Mediapart was conducting an investigation to be published around the time of the film's release, and attached to the press release statements Corsini and Perez had given to Mediapart. Mediapart criticised Labadie for releasing the statements, saying, "What precedes the publication belongs to the journalists, and breaking this principle likely exposes our sources and makes our work impossible."

=== Public reaction ===
Denis Gravouil, secretary general of the CGT Spectacle, said about the sexual assault on a young actress: "The denial of the facts by the director and producer, who sought to minimise the incident, created conflict on the set and aggressive behaviour on the part of Catherine Corsini, leading to the departure of the two technicians" who denounced the assault.

The selection of the film by the Cannes Film Festival was criticised by Collectif 50/50, a French NGO promoting equality between men and women in the film industry. The organisation wrote, "It is obviously a devastating signal sent to the victims of gender-based and sexual violence, and it is also a way of reinforcing the collusion that prevails in our industry, and which prevents the peaceful release of speech on this crucial subject." Collectif 50/50 admonished the production about the importance of taking steps to prevent violence, such as the appointment of an intimacy coordinator to plan and structure sexual scenes.

In April 2023, Pierre Salvadori, a longtime friend of Corsini, suggested to the Society of Film Directors (SRF), the guild behind the Directors' Fortnight sidebar at the Cannes Film Festival, that it release a statement about its position on the allegations. Although Salvadori said his intention was not to publish a statement defending Corsini, his proposal received criticism from colleagues, leading him and Corsini to resign from the SRF.

In April 2023, producer Marc Missonnier criticised Cannes for selecting the film and called for boycotting the festival on Twitter. On 17 May, he said he discovered, after arriving in Cannes, that his accreditation for the film market had been revoked in retaliation to his call for a boycott. On 18 May, the European Producers Club issued a statement denouncing the revocation, saying "it can be seen as a restriction on freedom of expression". On 22 May, Missonnier reported that his accreditation had been restored.
