= A Second Life =

2025 French drama film by Laurent Slama

- Promotional poster
- Directed by: Laurent Slama
- Written by: Laurent Slama; Thomas Keumurian
- Produced by: Maxime Montagne; Laurent Slama
- Starring: Agathe Rousselle; Alex Lawther; Suzy Bemba; Jonas Bachan
- Cinematography: Laurent Slama
- Edited by: Souliman Schelfout
- Music by: Jean-Charles Bastion
- Production company: 21 Juin CinémaLoulou
- Release date: 6 June 2025 (Tribeca Festival)
- Running time: 77 minutes
- Country: France
- Languages: English; French

A Second Life is a 2025 French drama film written and directed by Laurent Slama and starring Agathe Rousselle and Alex Lawther.

== Plot ==
During the Olympic Games in Paris, Elisabeth, a hearing-impaired woman grappling with depression, manages short-term rentals while seeking respite from the city's chaos by removing her hearing aids. Her day shifts dramatically when she meets Elijah, a free-spirited Californian, and finds a rare connection amid the noise of the opening ceremony.

== Cast ==
- Agathe Rousselle as Elisabeth
- Alex Lawther as Elijah
- Suzy Bemba
- Jonas Bachan

== Production ==
The film was largely shot on location in Paris during the 2024 Summer Olympics with a minimal crew.

== Release ==
The film premiered at Tribeca Festival on 6 June 2025 in the International Narrative Competition. The film later screened as a Special Screening at the 59th Karlovy Vary International Film Festival in July 2025.

== Reception ==
The Hollywood Reporter wrote that the film "avoids most of the clichés of your touristy Paris-set drama, all while using the genuine magic of the French capital," and praised Agathe Rousselle for carrying "a compellingly off-the-cuff Paris movie".

Cineuropa described it as "a beautiful platonic encounter" during the Paris Olympics, lauding its sensory depiction of Elisabeth’s perspective. James Y. Lee of Film Obsessive called it "a dramatically anodyne experience, where even on a formal and visual level, there’s very little about the film that excels."
