= Cliffhanger (2027 film) =

Upcoming film by Jaume Collet-Serra

- Directed by: Jaume Collet-Serra
- Screenplay by: Mark Bianculli; Melanie Toast
- Story by: Sascha Penn; Mark Bianculli
- Based on: Cliffhanger by Michael France
- Produced by: Lars Sylvest; Joe Neurauter; Thorsten Schumacher; Neal H. Moritz; Lily James; Toby Jaffe
- Starring: Lily James; Nell Tiger Free; Franz Rogowski; Pierce Brosnan
- Cinematography: Flavio Labiano
- Edited by: Krisztian Majdik
- Production companies: Thank You Pictures; Rocket Science; Supernix; StudioCanal; Original Film
- Distributed by: Vertical
- Country: United States
- Language: English

Cliffhanger is an upcoming American action thriller film serving as a reboot of the 1993 film. Directed by Jaume Collet-Serra, it stars Lily James, Nell Tiger Free, Franz Rogowski, and Pierce Brosnan. It is the second installment in the Cliffhanger film series.

== Premise ==
While staying with her father Ray Cooper, an experienced mountaineer who runs a luxury chalet in the Dolomites, Naomi and her sister Sydney join a weekend excursion with the son of a billionaire. When the group is ambushed by a gang of kidnappers, Naomi witnesses the attack and narrowly escapes. Forced into hiding, she must summon her courage to save Sydney and her father before it is too late.

== Cast ==
- Lily James as Naomi Cooper, Ray's oldest daughter and Sydney's older sister
- Pierce Brosnan as Ray Cooper, an experienced mountaineer and Naomi and Sydney's father
- Nell Tiger Free as Sydney Cooper, Naomi's younger sister and Ray's youngest daughter
- Franz Rogowski
- Shubham Saraf
- Assaad Bouab
- Suzy Bemba
- Bruno Gouery

== Production ==
=== As a sequel ===
In 1994, TriStar Pictures announced plans to develop a sequel to the 1993 film Cliffhanger, titled Cliffhanger 2: The Dam, with Sylvester Stallone reprising his starring role as Gabe Walker. The plot revolved around Gabe combating terrorists who took control of the Hoover Dam. The project remained in development until 2008, when the project was revived with Stallone's involvement, before being shelved. In May 2009, it was announced that a reimagining was in development. Produced by Neal H. Moritz, the project would be a joint-production between Original Film and StudioCanal. The story would focus around a group of young climbers and was tentatively scheduled to begin principal photography the following year. Moritz stated that his intent was to adapt the story in a similar manner comparable to J.J. Abrams' work on Star Trek. By May 2014, Joe Gazzam was hired as screenwriter after pitching his approach to the story to Moritz. By May 2015, Stallone expressed interest in developing a direct sequel to the original film. In May 2019, Rocket Science optioned the rights from StudioCanal and Sony Pictures to develop an entirely new screenplay and turn the story into a female-led version. Ana Lily Amirpour was hired as director, with a new draft of the script written by Sascha Penn. Jason Momoa was in early negotiations to feature in a prominent cameo role; Thorsten Schumacher, Lars Sylvest, Toby Jaffe and Neal Moritz were attached as producers. The story was described as a survival action thriller. The producers stated that there are plans for more than one installment to be made.

In May 2023, it was announced that the project would be redeveloped as a legacy-sequel. Ric Roman Waugh was hired as director (replacing Amirpour), from a new script written by Mark Bianculli. Stallone was slated to reprise his role from the original, in addition to taking on a role as producer. The plot was stated as the continued adventures of climber-turned-rescue ranger Gabriel "Gabe" Walker alongside a supporting cast and feature the Italian Alps. Moritz, Jaffe, Schumacher, Sylvest and Braden Aftergood were stated to also serve as producers. Original Film, Balboa Productions, StudioCanal, Rocket Science, Wright Productions & Entertainment and Front Row Entertainment were named as production studios. The movie had a presence at Cannes, where additional funding and distribution were secured. In December 2023, it was announced that additional film companies had joined the project including FilmFernsehFonds Bayern, Black Magic Films, Supernix, Maze Pictures and Occupant Entertainment. Joe Neurauter and Philipp Kreuzer came on board as producers and filming was scheduled to commence in the fall of 2024 in Bavaria and Munich.

=== As a reboot ===
In October 2024, it was reported that Stallone and Roman Waugh were no longer involved with the film; in a creative overhaul, the project was changed from a direct sequel to a reimagining with Jaume Collet-Serra taking over as director. Additionally, Melanie Toast was added as a writer. Bianculli and Toast received screenplay credit, while Penn and Bianculli received story credit. Lily James was cast in the lead role, with Pierce Brosnan, Nell Tiger Free, Franz Rogowski, Shubham Saraf, Assaad Bouab, Suzy Bemba, and Bruno Gouery in supporting roles. Principal photography began that same month in Austria. Krisztian Majdik edited the film.

== Release ==
At the 2025 Toronto International Film Festival, Row K Entertainment reportedly bought the American distribution rights for Cliffhanger for an August 28, 2026 U.S. theatrical release. However, a Variety report published in March 2026 questioned whether the distribution deal had even been finalized, owing to the studio's financial problems. In May 2026, Variety reported that Decal was nearing a deal to partner with Row K on the film's theatrical and ancillary release, which it was speculated would move the film away from its scheduled August date. The film was then reported to have been scheduled for a theatrical release in the United States on February 24, 2027. However, in September 2026, Vertical acquired U.S. distribution rights to the film, planning to release it sometime in spring 2027.

== Future ==
In September 2025, a sequel was announced to be in development. Rocket Science and Thank You Pictures would return as production studios.
