= The Divide (2021 film) =

2021 film directed by Catherine Corsini

- French release poster
- French: La Fracture
- Directed by: Catherine Corsini
- Written by: Catherine Corsini; Agnès Feuvre; Laurette Polmanss
- Produced by: Elisabeth Perez
- Starring: Valeria Bruni Tedeschi; Marina Foïs; Pio Marmaï
- Cinematography: Jeanne Lapoirie
- Edited by: Frédéric Baillehaiche
- Music by: Robin Coudert
- Production companies: Chaz Productions; Le Pacte; France 3 Cinéma; Auvergne Rhône-Alpes Cinéma
- Distributed by: Le Pacte
- Release dates: 9 July 2021 (Cannes); 27 October 2021 (France)
- Running time: 98 minutes
- Country: France
- Language: French
- Budget: €4.9 million; (≃$4.8 million)
- Box office: $2.2 million

The Divide (French: La Fracture) is a 2021 French comedy-drama film directed by Catherine Corsini, co-written by Corsini, Agnès Feuvre and Laurette Polmanss. It follows a night in a Parisian hospital, where injured Raf (Valeria Bruni Tedeschi) and her wife Julie (Marina Foïs), find themselves in the middle of a overcrowded night with many yellow vest rioters injured by the police, such as Yann (Pio Marmaï).

The film had its world premiere in the main competition of the 2021 Cannes Film Festival, on 9 July 2021, where it was nominated for the Palme d'Or and won the Queer Palm. It was theatrically released in France on 27 October 2021 by Le Pacte. At the 47th César Awards it received 6 nominations, including Best Film, Best Actress (Tedeschi) and Best Actor (Marmaï), and won Best Supporting Actress for Aïssatou Diallo Sagna.

== Synopsis ==
During a winter evening in 2018, Raf, on the verge of breaking up with Julie, fractures an elbow and ends up in the emergency department of a large Parisian hospital. At the same time, Yann arrives injured from the clash with the riot police at a large demonstration of yellow vests. The encounter between these three characters shatters their certainties and prejudices, while outside the tension intensifies and the hospital has to close its doors for the protestors who besiege the building and the staff are overwhelmed.

== Cast ==
- Valeria Bruni Tedeschi as Raf
- Marina Foïs as Julie
- Pio Marmaï as Yann
- Jean-Louis Coulloc'h as Laurent Maillard
- Aïssatou Diallo Sagna as Kim

== Production ==
The role of Raf represents Catherine Corsini a lot, who fell breaking her elbow and finding herself in the emergency room on 1 December 2018, the day of the First Act of the Yellow Vests [sic]. In September 2020, it was announced Valeria Bruni Tedeschi, Marina Foïs, Pio Marmaï, Jean-Louis Coulloc'h and Aïssatou Diallo Sagna had joined the cast of the film. Catherine Corsini wrote the script alongside Agnès Feuvre, with Laurette Polmanss collaborating. Filming began on 23 September 2020 and was scheduled to place over seven weeks in the Paris region and in Lyon.

== Release ==
The film premiered at the 2021 Cannes Film Festival on 9 July 2021. It was theatrically released in France on 27 October 2021.

== Reception ==
=== Box office ===
The Divide grossed $2.2 million worldwide, of which $2.1 million was grossed in France, against a production budget of about $4.8 million.

=== Critical response ===
On review aggregator Rotten Tomatoes, the film holds an approval rating of 72% based on 18 reviews, with an average rating of 6/10. On Metacritic, the film holds a score of 61 out of 100, based on 8 critics, indicating "generally favorable reviews".
