= Rocket Science (film production company) =

UK film production company

- Industry: Film industry, Independent film production and sales
- Founded: 2016; 10 years ago in London, United Kingdom
- Founder: Thorsten Schumacher
- Headquarters: London, United Kingdom
- Area served: Worldwide
- Products: Motion pictures
- Services: Film finance; Film production; Film distribution
- Number of employees: 12-20
- Website: rocket-science.net

Rocket Science is an independent film production, financing and sales company based in the United Kingdom.

== History ==
Rocket Science was founded in 2016 in London by Thorsten Schumacher, as an independent media company with a focus on film financing, development and international sales. Since releasing its first theatrical feature film in 2018, Rocket Science has represented a catalogue of over forty feature films.

== Filmography ==
=== 2018 ===
- On Chesil Beach
- Juliet, Naked
- The Old Man & the Gun

=== 2019 ===
- Destroyer
- The Beach Bum
- The Gentlemen
- At Eternity's Gate

=== 2020 ===
- The Trial of the Chicago 7

=== 2021 ===
- French Exit
- Here Today
- Mothering Sunday
- Mona Lisa and the Blood Moon
- Flag Day
- Resistance
- Schumacher
- She Will
- Boxing Day

=== 2022 ===
- All Quiet on the Western Front
- Crimes of the Future
- Black Site
- The Stranger
- Squaring the Circle (The Story of Hipgnosis)
- Living

=== 2023 ===
- A Good Person
- Robots
- May December
- Dead Shot
- Haunting of the Queen Mary
- Ferrari

=== 2024 ===
- Ricky Stanicky
- Red Right Hand
- Lee
- The Apprentice
- Better Man

=== 2025 ===
- Fight or Flight
- The Salt Path
- The Penguin Lessons
- Adulthood
- Momo

=== 2026 ===
- The Last House
- Sacrifice
- The Fix
- Tenzing

=== Upcoming ===
- The Queen of Fashion
- Cliffhanger
- Riddick: Furya
- Untitled How to Lose a Guy in 10 Days sequel
- The Bluff
- Next Life
