= Wonderwell =

2023 Italian-American fantasy film

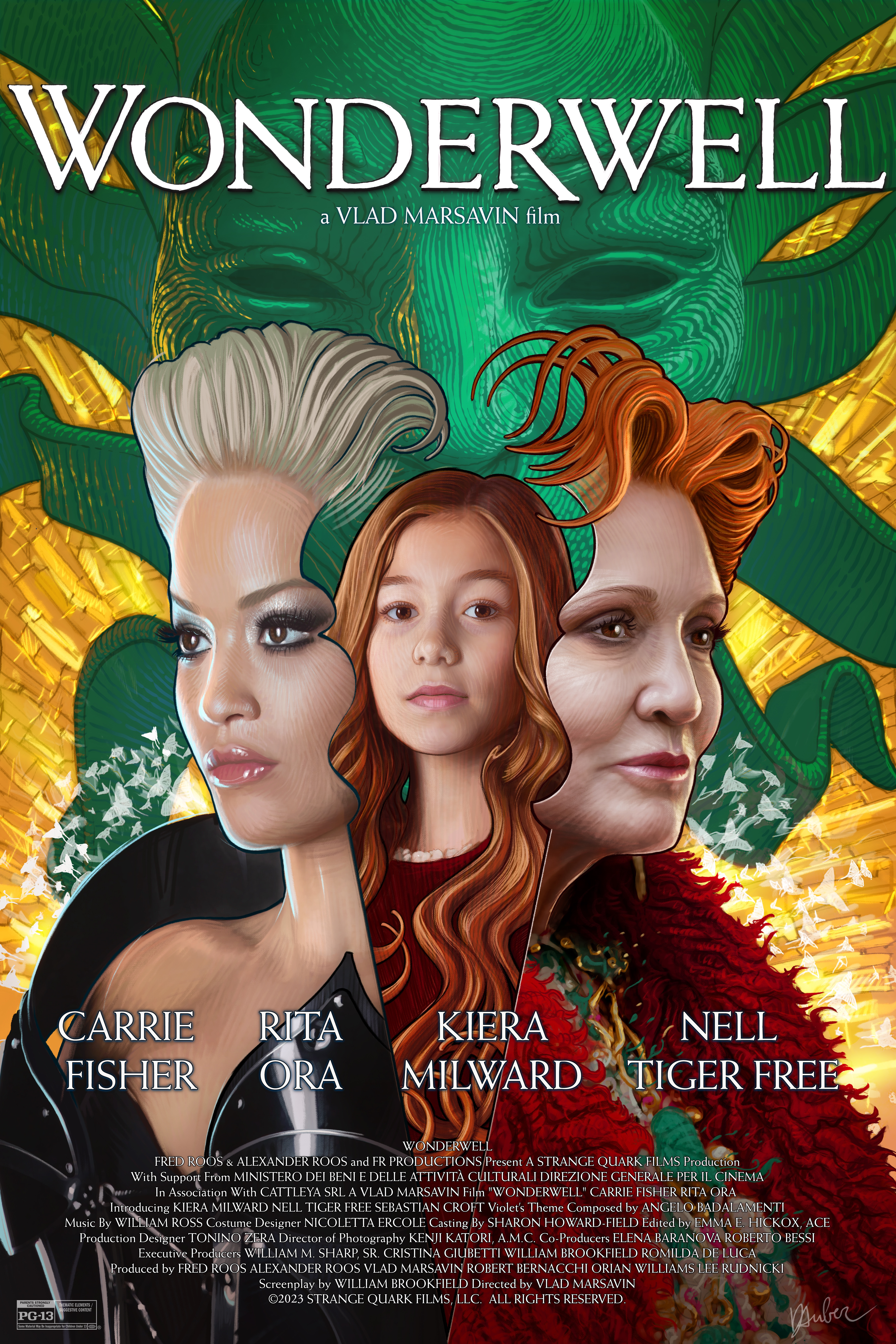
- Directed by: Vlad Marsavin
- Written by: William Brookfield
- Based on: Drainhole Dreaming by William Brookfield
- Produced by: Fred Roos; Alexander Roos; Vlad Marsavin; Robert Bernacchi; Orian Williams; Lee Rudnicki
- Starring: Carrie Fisher; Rita Ora; Kiera Milward; Nell Tiger Free; Sebastian Croft; Vincent Spano; Megan Dodds; Lloyd Owen; Niccolo Besio
- Cinematography: Kenji Katori
- Edited by: Emma E. Hickox
- Music by: William Ross; Angelo Badalamenti
- Production company: Strange Quark Films
- Distributed by: Vertical (North America, UK and Ireland); Epic Pictures (International)
- Release date: June 23, 2023
- Running time: 96 minutes
- Countries: United States; Italy
- Language: English

Wonderwell is a 2023 Italian-American fantasy film directed by Vlad Marsavin, produced by Fred Roos, and based on the short story "Drainhole Dreaming" by William Brookfield. It stars Carrie Fisher (in her final film role before her death in 2016), Rita Ora, Kiera Milward, and Nell Tiger Free.

== Synopsis ==
At 12 years old, Violet lives in Italy with her parents, Adam and Chlo, and her beautiful older sister Savannah. When she is selected to be the face of world-renowned designer Yana's fashion label, the family travels to an enchanting medieval village for her first photo shoot. Neglected and bored, Violet wanders from the ancient Tuscan town into a nearby forest where she meets the enigmatic Hazel, who may be the fabled witch of the woods Violet was warned about by Yana's beleaguered stepson, Daniele. Guided by Hazel to a mysterious portal, Violet is offered a glimpse of what her future might hold, but like the transition from childhood to womanhood, it may be a journey of no return.

== Cast ==
- Kiera Milward as Violet
- Carrie Fisher as Hazel
- Rita Ora as Yana
- Nell Tiger Free as Savannah
- Sebastian Croft as Daniele
- Vincent Spano as Franco
- Megan Dodds as Chlo
- Lloyd Owen as Adam
- Niccolo Besio as Enrico
- Giorgia Gargano as Anna
- Maria Grazia Cucinotta as Anna's mother

== Production ==
Principal photography took place in Tuscany and in Cinecittà Studios in Rome, Italy between October 2016 and February 2017. Several scenes were shot in the ancient Etruscan towns of San Gimignano and Volterra. Film producer Fred Roos, known for his lifelong collaboration with Francis Ford Coppola, brought Fisher, Ora and a number of the key creative team to the project. Fisher, who died in late 2016, just six weeks after wrapping her scenes, leads the cast alongside British singer and actress Rita Ora and newcomer Kiera Milward.

The film's score, composed by William Ross, was performed by the London Symphony Orchestra. Angelo Badalamenti, known for his collaborations with David Lynch on projects including Twin Peaks and Mulholland Drive, composed the film's "Violet's Theme". One of the film's central characters, The Creature, was inspired by Cel, the Etruscan goddess of the Mother Earth and designed by art director Daniele Auber, known for his works for Terry Gilliam and Luc Besson.

Due to interruptions with funding, post-production was extended until early 2020, and then, due to the COVID-19 lockdowns, all work on the almost finished film was suspended for several months.

== Release ==
On June 14, 2023, Deadline Hollywood announced that Vertical had acquired the North American, UK, and Ireland rights to the film and announced its release. On June 16, 2023, it published the official theatrical poster and the first official trailer. The film had a limited theatrical release in the U.S. and also appeared on all online platforms on June 23, 2023.

Wonderwell was also released in Germany, Austria, Switzerland, Poland, Slovakia, and the Benelux countries on November 24, 2023, by Splendid Film.

== Reception ==
On the review aggregator website Rotten Tomatoes, 38% of eight critics' reviews are positive, with an average rating of 3.3/10.

The release of Carrie Fisher's final film was welcomed by her fans and by fans of the fantasy genre.

Benjamin Lee of The Guardian gave the film one out of five stars, deeming it "a rather limp, confusing little fantasy that could have been left gathering even more dust on the shelf without anyone needing to know".

Independent blogger Mike Haberfelner called Wonderwell "a visually stunning film, full of impressive set designs", "a mix of coming-of-age story, dark fairy tale and thriller, in which well fleshed-out characters are embodied by a relatable ensemble cast, making this a pretty cool and pretty unusual ride."

WorldFilmGeek portal wrote that "Wonderwell is a terrific and emotionally charged fantasy film that closes the book of a Hollywood icon. Carrie Fisher's final performance is a wonderful delight to see as someone who not only loves the work but brings that iconic off-screen personality to the screens. We still miss Carrie Fisher, but there couldn't be a better sendoff than this film."
