= Ismael Cruz Córdova =

Puerto Rican television, stage and film actor

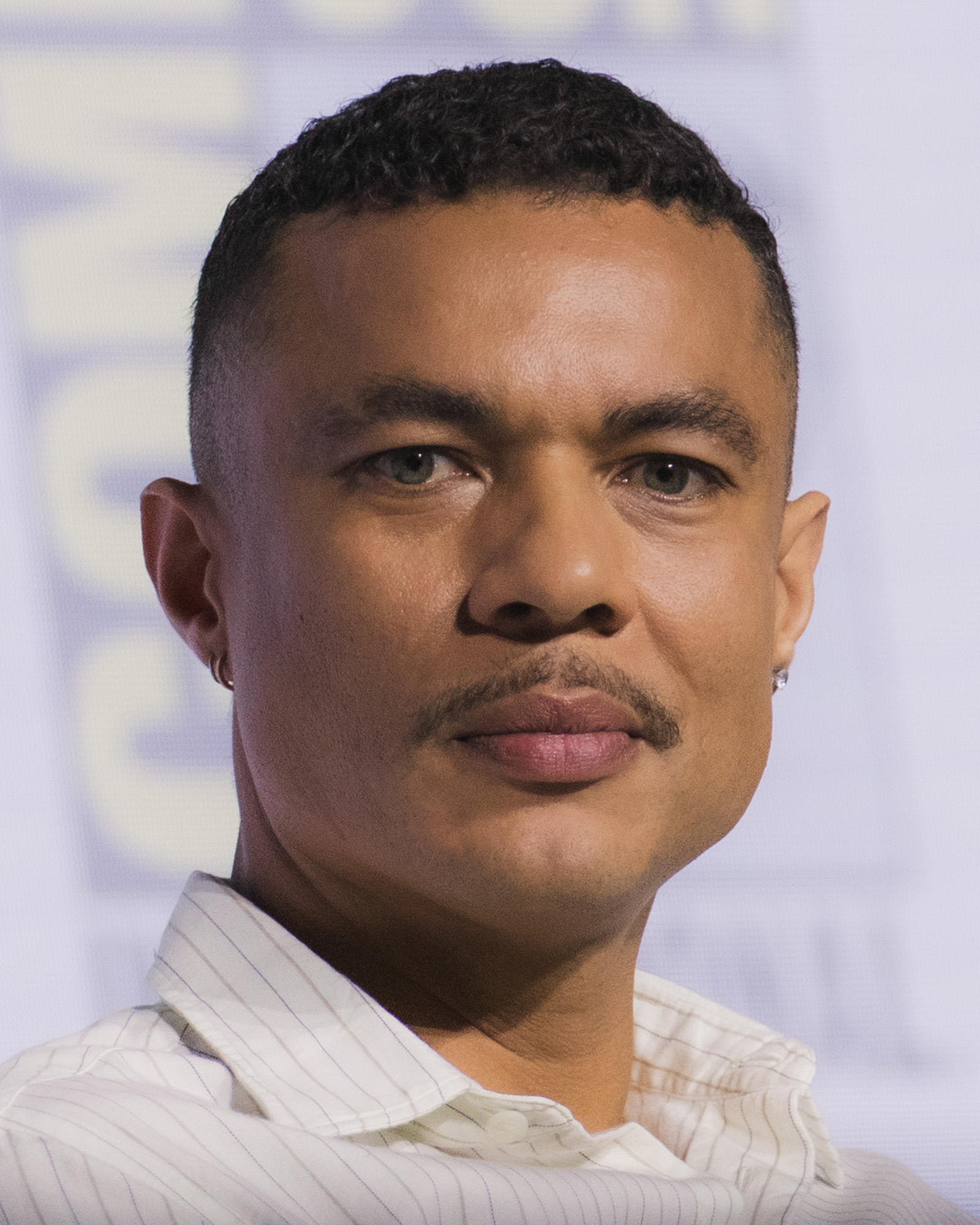
- Cruz Córdova in 2026
- Born: Ismael Enrique Cruz Córdova; April 7, 1987 (age 39); Aguas Buenas, Puerto Rico
- Occupation: Actor
- Years active: 2003–present

Ismael Enrique Cruz Córdova (born April 7, 1987) is a Puerto Rican actor who gained national attention for his role as Mando on Sesame Street. Other credits include The Good Wife (2011), In the Blood (2014), Exposed (2016), Ray Donovan (2016), Billy Lynn's Long Halftime Walk (2016), Mary Queen of Scots (2018), Miss Bala (2019), Settlers (2021), Berlin Station (2018), The Mandalorian episode "Chapter 6: The Prisoner" (2019), The Undoing (2020), Guillermo del Toro's Cabinet of Curiosities episode "The Dreams in the Witch House" (2022), and The Lord of the Rings: The Rings of Power (2022–2026).

== Education ==
Cruz Córdova transferred to and attended New York University Tisch School of the Arts and was a resident assistant for a freshman dormitory in his senior year.

== Career ==
Cruz had a role in the Showtime original series Ray Donovan, and in the third season of Berlin Station, as Rafael Torres, an SOG operative.

He played the elf Arondir in the TV series The Lord of the Rings: The Rings of Power, released in September 2022 on Amazon Prime.

== Filmography ==
=== Film ===
Key
†	Denotes films that have not yet been released

Year	Title	Role	Notes
2014	In the Blood	Manny	
2016	Exposed	Jose De La Cruz	
2016	Billy Lynn's Long Halftime Walk	Holliday	
2018	Mary Queen of Scots	David Rizzio	
2019	Miss Bala	Lino Esparza	
2021	Settlers	Jerry	
2023	Finestkind	Costa	
2025	The Pickup	Miguel	
2026	The Bluff	Theodor H. Bodden / "T.H."	
2026	Verity	Corey	
2026	He Bled Neon †	TBA	Post-production
TBA	Porto Rico †		Filming

=== Television ===
Year	Title	Role	Notes
2005	El Cuerpo del Delito	Manny	Television film
2011	The Good Wife	Jimmy Patrick	5 episodes
2012–13	Little Children, Big Challenges	Mando	2 episodes
2013–14	Sesame Street	Mando	12 episodes
2016	Ray Donovan	Hector Campos	Recurring role, season 4; 10 episodes
2016	Divorce	Clerk	Episode: "Mediation"
2016	Citizen	Chris Martinez	Television film
2017	The Catch	The Hammer	3 episodes
2018–19	Berlin Station	Rafael Torres	Main role, season 3
2019	The Mandalorian	Qin	Episode: "Chapter 6: The Prisoner"
2020	The Undoing	Fernando Alves	Miniseries; 4 episodes
2022	Santiago of the Seas	Capitán Calavera (voice)	Episode: "The Stones of Power"
2022–2026	The Lord of the Rings: The Rings of Power	Arondir	Main role, 20 episodes
2022	Guillermo del Toro's Cabinet of Curiosities	Frank	Episode: "The Dreams in the Witch House"

== See also ==
- List of Afro-Latinos
