= My Everything (film) =

2024 film

- Directed by: Anne-Sophie Bailly
- Written by: Anne-Sophie Bailly
- Produced by: David Thion; Philippe Martin
- Starring: Laure Calamy; Charles Peccia-Galletto
- Cinematography: Nader Chalhoub
- Edited by: Quentin Sombsthay; François Quiqueré
- Music by: Jean Thevenin
- Release date: 31 August 2024 (Venice)
- Language: French

My Everything (French: Mon inséparable) is a 2024 French drama film written and directed by Anne-Sophie Bailly, in her feature film debut. It premiered at the 81st edition of the Venice Film Festival.

== Plot ==
A 50-year-old woman wants to start taking care of herself, but her plans change when her disabled son announces he is going to have a baby, adding responsibilities. Mona is a single, middle-aged beautician, completely dedicated to her 30-year-old son Joël, who lives with a neurological disability. Joël works in a specialised facility and is secretly in love with co-worker Océane. Mona knows nothing of their relationship, until she realizes that Océane is pregnant.

Océane’s parents and Mona are stunned by the news, but Joël and Océane confirm they are in love and determined to forge a life together. Mona finds herself torn between her son’s iron will, her maternal instincts and a suppressed desire to enjoy life on her own terms.

== Cast ==
- Laure Calamy as Mona
- Charles Peccia-Galletto as Joël
- Julie Froger as Océane
- Geert Van Rampelberg as Frank
- Rébecca Finet as Nathalie
- Pasquale d'Inca as Gabriel
- Aïssatou Diallo Sagna as Séverine
- Jean de Pange as Christophe
- Karimouche as Maguy
- Miss Ming as the servant

== Production ==
The film was produced by produced by Les Films Pelléas, with France 3 Cinéma and Pictanovo serving as co-producers.

== Release ==
The film had its world premiere at the 81st Venice International Film Festival in the Orizzonti sidebar. It was released in French cinemas on 25 December 2024.

== Reception ==
Cineuropa's film critic Fabien Lemercier praised the film, describing it as a "dynamic and tightly paced first feature film" and "a beautiful and nuanced portrait of a woman".

Marilou Duponchel from Les Inrockuptibles described the film as "a beautiful first film about filial love that is far removed from convention" that "with an acute sense of psychology [...] has the virtue of delving deep into the palette of feelings to observe their minute nuances".
