= Replay (2001 film) =

2001 film

- Film poster
- Directed by: Catherine Corsini
- Written by: Catherine Corsini; Pascale Breton; Pierre-Erwan Guillaume; Marc Syrigas
- Produced by: Philippe Martin
- Starring: Emmanuelle Béart; Pascale Bussières
- Cinematography: Agnès Godard
- Edited by: Sabine Mamou
- Music by: Pierre Bondu; Fabrice Dumont
- Distributed by: Pyramide Distribution
- Release date: 22 August 2001
- Running time: 96 minutes
- Countries: France; Canada
- Language: French
- Budget: $4.5 million
- Box office: $1.3 million

Replay (French: La répétition) is a 2001 French-Canadian drama film directed by Catherine Corsini. It was entered into the 2001 Cannes Film Festival.

== Plot ==
Nathalie (Emmanuelle Béart) and Louise (Pascale Bussières) were inseparable childhood friends who dreamed of becoming actresses. They meet again by chance after more than ten years apart. Now in her thirties, Nathalie has become a renowned stage actress, while Louise works as a dental technician and is married to a man called Nicolas.

Because of her admiration for Nathalie, Louise wants to make her happy in spite of herself and insists that she work with a prestigious director: Walter Amar. Louise lives vicariously through her friend's promise of success: she lives with her, attends her work and quickly becomes indispensable to her, all the while forming a romantic relationship. Louise gives Nathalie no respite, and the relationship gradually turns into a spiral of passion.

== Cast ==
- Emmanuelle Béart as Nathalie
- Pascale Bussières as Louise
- Dani Levy as Matthias (as Dani Lévy)
- Jean-Pierre Kalfon as Walter Amar
- Sami Bouajila as Nicolas
- Marilu Marini as Mathilde
- Clément Hervieu-Léger as Sacha
- Marc Ponette as Alain
- Raphaël Neal as Patrick
- Sébastien Gorteau as Jean-Philippe
- Vincent Macaigne as Henri
