= Last Days (2005 film) =

- Theatrical release poster
- Directed by: Gus Van Sant
- Written by: Gus Van Sant
- Produced by: Gus Van Sant; Dany Wolf
- Starring: Michael Pitt; Lukas Haas; Asia Argento; Scott Patrick Green
- Cinematography: Harris Savides
- Edited by: Gus Van Sant
- Music by: Rodrigo Lopresti; Michael Pitt
- Production company: HBO Films
- Distributed by: Picturehouse
- Release date: July 22, 2005
- Running time: 97 minutes
- Country: United States
- Language: English
- Box office: $2.4 million

Last Days is a 2005 American drama film written, directed, produced and edited by Gus Van Sant. It is a fictionalized account of the last days of a musician, loosely based on Kurt Cobain. It was released to theaters in the United States on July 22, 2005 and was produced by HBO. The film stars Michael Pitt as the character Blake, based on Cobain. Lukas Haas, Asia Argento, Scott Patrick Green and Thadeus A. Thomas also star in the film. This is the first film from Picturehouse, a joint venture between Time Warner's New Line Cinema and HBO Films subsidiaries to release art house, independent, foreign, and documentary films. The film polarized critics.

== Plot ==
In April 1994, a young musician named Blake sneaks out of a rehab clinic and walks home through a forest, also swimming through a lake then lighting a fire for the night. The next day, he gets home and changes his clothes. He walks around in the house with a shotgun, pointing it at his sleeping roommates Scott, Luke, Asia, and Nicole. He is greeted by Yellow Pages representative Thadeus A. Thomas who talks to him about placing an ad in the upcoming book. He receives a phone call from his record company telling him that he and his band have to do another tour and that it is important they make the booked dates, but Blake hangs up. He goes upstairs and falls asleep on the floor in one of the rooms. Asia awakes and finds him asleep as two LDS missionaries arrive at the door. Scott and Luke answer the door and the two missionaries talk to them about their church and its teachings. Blake changes into different clothes and leaves the house for the shed outside as the missionaries leave.

Scott, Luke, Asia, and Nicole leave and Blake goes back into the house. His friend Donovan and a private detective come to the house and Blake leaves as they look around the house for him. He waits for them to leave before he enters the house again. He messes with the guitars and drums putting them on loop with his vocals. He stops when his record executive comes over and tries to have him leave with her but Blake refuses. Blake goes to a rock club that night where a friend of his comes up to him and tells him about how he went to a Grateful Dead concert. Blake leaves before his friend can finish telling the story. Blake goes back home where Scott takes some of his money and Luke asks for help from Blake on a song.

Scott tells Luke that Donovan had a private detective with him and that they should leave. After Scott and Luke have sex upstairs, Blake plays acoustic one last time before walking out to the shed where he sits quietly, watching his roommates leave. They spend the night at their friend's house, and awake the next morning to see the news announcing that Blake died by suicide and an electrician found his body. Scott, Luke, and Nicole get in a car and leave, driving down a highway while Luke plays the guitar in the back seat.

== Cast ==
- Michael Pitt as Blake
- Lukas Haas as Luke
- Asia Argento as Asia
- Scott Patrick Green as Scott
- Nicole Vicius as Nicole
- Ricky Jay as Detective
- Ryan Orion as Donovan
- Harmony Korine as Guy In Club
- Rodrigo Lopresti as Member of The Band In Club
- Kim Gordon as Record Executive
- Adam Friberg and Andy Friberg as Elders Friberg
- Thadeus A. Thomas as Yellow Pages Salesman

== Relation to other Van Sant films ==
Last Days is the third and final installment in what Van Sant has frequently called his "Death Trilogy", which began with Gerry (2002) and continued with Elephant (2003). The dialogue and narration in all three films are minimal, and scenes do not proceed linearly. As in Elephant, scenes are revisited from new angles, starting at differing points in time, without a signal to viewers that the clock has been turned back and a previous scene is being revisited. In a later film, Paranoid Park (2007), Van Sant uses the same technique. Also as in the other films, many of the actors' character names are the same as their actual first names.

== Production ==
=== Background ===
Van Sant has stated he had contemplated the project for nearly a decade. At one time, he wanted to do a biographical film about Cobain but decided against the idea out of concern over the potential of a lawsuit by Cobain's widow, Courtney Love. Van Sant was unsure how Cobain's fans and family would react to Last Days; he spoke to Love several times over the years about his project and recently expressed his concern that it might be painful for her to see the film. Actress Asia Argento stated, "It's been written that I play Courtney Love, and it's not true. I'm so upset. I don't know why people say that. I feel very sorry for her. She's been demonized and I feel sorry for anybody that's lost like that. But no, I play a character that's very dorky."

=== Music ===
Last Days features two original compositions by Michael Pitt: an acoustic song entitled "Death to Birth" and an electric jam called "That Day". Lukas Haas composed another piece, "Untitled". Rodrigo Lopresti composed "Seen as None" and "Pointless Ride". The character Scott listens to "Venus in Furs" by The Velvet Underground. Blake, in one scene, watches the music video for "On Bended Knee" by Boyz II Men on television. "Venus in Furs" contains the lyric "...on bended knee". A soundscape piece called "Doors of Perception" ("Türen der Wahrnehmung") was composed by Hildegard Westerkamp.

=== Filming ===
The film was shot in the Hudson Valley region of New York, which, due in part to cinematographer Harris Savides' specialized treatment of the film stock, suggests the Pacific Northwest, where Van Sant is from.

== Reception ==
On Rotten Tomatoes it has an approval rating of 58% based on reviews from 119 critics, with an average rating of 6.1/10. The site's consensus says, "While the minimalist style is not for all viewers, those who prefer experimentalism will find Last Days hypnotic." On Metacritic it has a weighted average score of 67 out of 100 based on reviews from 36 critics, indicating "generally favorable" reviews.

Leslie Felperin of Variety wrote: "Result is dead-on depiction of the hedonistic rock lifestyle, punctuated by sequences of haunting beauty but also quasi-religious imagery that borders on tacky."

=== Awards ===
The film was entered in the 2005 Cannes Film Festival where it won the Technical Grand Prize. It was nominated for an Independent Spirit Award for Best Cinematography, but failed to win any awards at the festival.

=== Legacy ===
The film was adapted into an opera of the same name by British composer Oliver Leith and visual artist Matt Copson, which premiered in 2022 at the Linbury Theatre as a coproduction of Guildhall School of Music and Drama and the Royal Opera House, featuring French actress Agathe Rousselle in the role of Blake.

Director Matt Reeves has said that this movie was an influence on the character of Bruce Wayne in The Batman (2022).

== See also ==
- Books and films inspired by Kurt Cobain
