= Three Worlds (film) =

2012 film

- Film poster
- Directed by: Catherine Corsini
- Written by: Catherine Corsini; Benoît Graffin
- Produced by: Fabienne Vonier
- Starring: Raphaël Personnaz; Clotilde Hesme
- Cinematography: Claire Mathon
- Edited by: Muriel Breton
- Music by: Grégoire Hetzel
- Distributed by: Pyramide Distribution
- Release dates: 24 May 2012 (Cannes); 5 December 2012 (France)
- Running time: 100 minutes
- Country: France
- Language: French
- Budget: $4.8 million
- Box office: $324.000

Three Worlds (French: Trois mondes) is a 2012 French drama film directed by Catherine Corsini. The film competed in the Un Certain Regard section at the 2012 Cannes Film Festival.

== Plot ==
An ambitious and gifted young man named Al is about to marry the daughter of his boss. This is supposed to make himself the new boss. He celebrates his future with his friends. But when he decides to drive a car in spite of the previous binge drinking he kills somebody. Fearing his prospects to fade away he lets his friends persuade him to commit hit and run.

== Cast ==
- Raphaël Personnaz as Al
- Clotilde Hesme as Juliette
- Arta Dobroshi as Vera
- Reda Kateb as Franck
- Alban Aumard as Martin
- Adèle Haenel as Marion
- Jean-Pierre Malo as Testard
- Laurent Capelluto as Frédéric
- Rasha Bukvic as Adrian
