= The Beach Bum =

2019 film directed by Harmony Korine

- Theatrical release poster
- Directed by: Harmony Korine
- Written by: Harmony Korine
- Produced by: Charles-Marie Anthonioz; Mourad Belkeddar; Steve Golin; John Lesher; Nicholas Lhermitte
- Starring: Matthew McConaughey; Snoop Dogg; Isla Fisher; Jimmy Buffett; Zac Efron; Martin Lawrence
- Cinematography: Benoît Debie
- Edited by: Douglas Crise
- Music by: John Debney
- Production companies: Iconoclast; Anonymous Content; Le Grisbi Productions; SPK Pictures; Vice Films; Riverstone Pictures; Rocket Science
- Distributed by: Neon
- Release dates: March 9, 2019 (SXSW); March 29, 2019 (United States)
- Running time: 95 minutes
- Country: United States
- Language: English
- Budget: $5 million
- Box office: $4.6 million

The Beach Bum is a 2019 American stoner comedy film written and directed by Harmony Korine and starring Matthew McConaughey, Snoop Dogg, Isla Fisher, Jimmy Buffett in his final feature film, Zac Efron and Martin Lawrence, with Stefania LaVie Owen and Jonah Hill in supporting roles. The plot follows the adventures of stoner poet Moondog (McConaughey) in and around the Florida Keys as he tries to finish his new novel and fight for the respect of his daughter and his share of his wife's estate after she dies in a car accident.

The Beach Bum had its world premiere at South by Southwest on March 9, 2019, and was theatrically released in the United States on March 29, 2019, by Neon. The film received mixed reviews from critics, with some calling it "joyous" and others describing it as an "epic goof", though McConaughey's performance received near-universal praise. The film was a box office disappointment, grossing $4.6 million worldwide on a $5 million budget.

== Plot ==
Moondog, a substance-abusing poet, leads a hedonistic and pseudo-nomadic lifestyle in and around the Florida Keys while working on his new book. Despite perceptions that he is past his prime, he enjoys local notoriety as a legendary figure. His indulgent lifestyle is funded by his wealthy wife Minnie, which draws disapproval from their daughter Heather and agent Lewis. Throughout his journeys, Moondog engages in promiscuous relationships, while Minnie has a secret affair with his friend, R&B singer Lingerie.

After arriving late to Heather's wedding in Miami, Moondog's infidelity leads to a drunken altercation with the groom, Frank, in front of the guests. Later, Minnie reveals her affair during a conversation with Heather about Moondog's behavior. Meanwhile, Lingerie introduces Moondog to a potent strain of cannabis found in Jamaica, which he credits for his success. At the reception, Moondog reconciles with Heather and Frank before witnessing an intimate moment between Minnie and Lingerie.

Following a night of intoxicated karaoke and dancing with Minnie, Moondog survives a car accident but Minnie succumbs to her injuries. Half of Minnie's estate goes to Heather, while Moondog's share is frozen until he completes his novel. In response, Moondog seeks revenge by vandalizing Minnie's mansion with a group of homeless individuals. To avoid imprisonment, he agrees to a year of rehabilitation but later escapes with a pyromaniac named Flicker. The two engage in a night of debauchery before parting ways as Moondog makes his way back to Miami.

Back in Miami, Moondog encounters "Captain Wack", an old friend and alleged Vietnam veteran who offers him a co-captain position on dolphin tours. However, a tour with great white sharks results in Captain Wack sustaining a severe injury. As the law pursues him, Moondog reunites with Lingerie, who confesses to the affair but claims Minnie truly loved him. Inspired by a dream and experience shared with Lingerie and Jimmy Buffett, Moondog adopts cross-dressing to evade detection.

The police close in on Lingerie's property, prompting Moondog to flee to Key West with Lingerie's assistance and a supply of the Jamaican weed. Motivated, Moondog completes his poetic memoir titled The Beach Bum, which earns him a Pulitzer Prize. The lawyer informs him that his inheritance is unfrozen, and Moondog demands it in physical cash on a large sailboat. During a celebration, he sets the money on fire, causing an explosion. Moondog survives, but the crowd is preoccupied with the raining money as he drifts away on the boat, laughing.

== Cast ==
- Matthew McConaughey as "Moondog"
- Snoop Dogg as Lingerie "Rie"
- Isla Fisher as Minnie
- Stefania LaVie Owen as Heather
- Martin Lawrence as Captain Wack
- Zac Efron as Flicker
- Jonah Hill as Lewis
- Jimmy Buffett as Himself
- Donovan Williams as "Rasta"
- David Bennett as Phil "Homeless Phil"
- Joshua Ritter as Frank "Limp Dick"
- John Morris as Cashier
- Jo Marie Payton as Judge
- Leah Van Dale as Samantha
- Ricky Diaz as Jonathan, The Best Man
- Bertie Higgins as Himself

== Production ==
Following the release of Spring Breakers and time spent living in Florida, writer-director Harmony Korine penned The Beach Bum, which is "based loosely on a set of characters he was hanging out with in the Keys". Journalist Zach Baron noted Korine "wrote the film swiftly, and then, as he did with Spring Breakers, Korine cast a mix of well-known actors", such as Matthew McConaughey, Jonah Hill, Zac Efron, Martin Lawrence, Jimmy Buffett, Snoop Dogg, Isla Fisher—"and real-life Florida denizens".

Speaking about the connection between the cast of Hollywood stars and the local grit of Florida, Korine said, "I like when they meet in the middle [...] Like when all the secondary characters, and all the locations, all the color, the sky, everything, it affects the main roles in a way. It's almost like a chemical reaction." McConaughey described the character of Moondog as "a verb. A folk poet. A character in a Bob Dylan song dancing through life's pleasure and pain knowing every interaction is another 'note' in the tune of his life." Similarly, Korine described the protagonist as a man that "lives for the second. There's no self-censor. He's just a sensualist. Whatever feels good, he just acts on it. So he does good, and he does bad." The role of Moondog was written for Gary Oldman, but he turned it down.

John Lesher, Steve Golin, Charles-Marie Anthonioz, Mourad Belkeddar and Nicholas Lhermitte produced the film under the LeGrisbi Productions, Anonymous Content and Iconoclast banners. Rocket Science handled international sales commencing at the European Film Market in Berlin.

Principal photography began in November 2017. Throughout the filming process, the cast brought their own creative direction to their characters. Snoop Dogg decided that rather than play himself, as written in Korine's script, he needed to take on a new character.

Additional strange inspiration came to Korine, as while eating a panini sandwich, the director thought that the pattern would "look good on Zac's face". The quote later went viral, when New Yorker columnist Lauren Leibowitz tweeted about the design for Efron's beard. While appearing on Jimmy Kimmel Live, McConaughey recounted how Snoop Dogg swapped out fake prop marijuana with "Snoop Weed". McConaughey said of the experience "the next nine hours were a whole lot of fun, but I don't believe we used one word in the English language".

== Release ==
In May 2017, Neon acquired distribution rights to the film. It had its world premiere at South by Southwest on March 9, 2019, and was theatrically released on March 29, 2019.

== Reception ==
=== Box office ===
In the United States and Canada, The Beach Bum was released alongside Dumbo and Unplanned, and was projected to gross $2–4 million from 1,100 theaters in its opening weekend. The film made $650,000 on its first day, including $200,000 from Thursday night previews. It ended up debuting to just $1.8 million, the lowest wide opening of McConaughey's career.

=== Critical response ===
On review aggregator Rotten Tomatoes, the film has an approval rating of 58% based on 127 reviews, with an average rating of 5.5/10. The website's critical consensus reads, "The role of a lifetime for Matthew McConaughey, The Beach Bum is set apart by Harmony Korine's distinctive style, but that isn't always enough to offset the unfocused story." On Metacritic, the film has a weighted average score of 55 out of 100, based on 31 critics, indicating "mixed or average reviews". Audiences polled by PostTrak gave the film an average 2.5 out of 5 stars and a 36% "definite recommend".

Rolling Stone's David Fear wrote, "Matthew McConaughey goes full 'just keep livin'' in this insane ode to fear, loathing and the art of the permanent happy hour." Critic Brian Tallerico of RogerEbert.com noted "the shaggy dog nature of this film, one that mimics its protagonist's neverending belief that everything is just gonna be all right, all right becomes almost transcendent... The Beach Bum works by never losing its tonal statement that all that really matters is what matters to you...man." A. A. Dowd of The A.V. Club gave the film a B−, noting how, "there's little plot and even less in the way of conflict... There's a collage quality to Korine's filmmaking—a sense that he's always just collecting moments, cobbling together scenes from the endless supply of improvised festivity that presumably erupted on set".
