= In the Blood (2014 film) =

2014 American action film

- Theatrical release poster
- Directed by: John Stockwell
- Written by: James Robert Johnston; Bennett Yellin
- Produced by: Raymond Mansfield; Shaun Redick; Marina Grasic; Cash Warren
- Starring: Gina Carano; Cam Gigandet; Ismael Cruz Córdova; Luis Guzmán; Treat Williams; Amaury Nolasco; Stephen Lang; Danny Trejo
- Cinematography: P. J. López
- Edited by: Doug Walker; Lucas Eskin
- Music by: Paul Haslinger
- Production company: 20th Century Fox Home Entertainment
- Distributed by: Anchor Bay Films; Freestyle Releasing
- Release date: April 4, 2014
- Running time: 108 minutes
- Country: United States
- Languages: English; Spanish
- Box office: $51,279

In the Blood is a 2014 American action thriller film directed by John Stockwell and starring former fighter Gina Carano in her second lead role after 2011's Haywire. The plot revolves around a 26-year-old newlywed named Ava who searches for her husband after he is abducted on their Caribbean honeymoon.

== Plot ==
In 2002, Ava, a 14-year-old girl from Bridgeport, Connecticut, wakes up in the middle of the night and sees her drug lord father murdered by intruders, before grabbing a shotgun and gunning down the two assailants. Twelve years later, after a rough life and recovering from drug and alcohol addiction, Ava marries the affluent Derek Grant in Arlington, the two having met while attending Narcotics Anonymous meetings.

The newlyweds are on honeymoon on a Caribbean island where Derek's family own a summer home. The couple are befriended by a young local, Manny, who invites them to a nightclub, where, following an encounter with local criminal Big Biz Ava fights with and beats up several patrons.

The next morning, Manny invites them to ride "El Viudador" ("The Widowmaker") a mile-long zip-line in the rainforest. Once there, Ava, who's afraid of heights, declines, but when Derek does, his harness snaps and he falls to the ground. Ava finds him in the forest, unconscious and injured, but alive. Forbidden to ride in the ambulance with her husband, she eventually reaches the hospital, where staff deny that Derek was brought in. After finding that none of the island's other clinics or medical facilities have admitted her husband, Ava declares him missing to the local police. At the zip-line the owner denies being open the day that Derek fell. Ava starts to search on her own. Dereks family arrive, but do not believe her because of her past, and leave again.

Ava interrogates a man at the zip-line, threatening him that she will drop him into the forest if he doesn't confess Derek's whereabouts, only to get arrested by the police. After seeing Ava's phone recording of her recent actions, Police Chief Garza orders Ava expulsion from the island. However, when Ava is on the ferry, she frees herself, jumps from the ferry and swims back to the island to continue searching for her husband.

At the nightclub she confronts Manny, who reluctantly agrees to help her. Ava recognises one of the men who had driven the ambulance, and follows him. Ava knocks him about and interrogates him. On his phone she summons his brother, but ends up killing him in the struggle, which attracts police attention again.

At the station, Ava is arrested and charged with murder and told she is a suspect in the disappearance of her husband. Later Ava sees from inside the police car that the arresting officers are digging a shallow grave and are planning to kill her. She breaks her hand free from the cuffs unnoticed and attacks the officers, killing both of them. Later that night Garza gets a phone call and hears Ava, alive and on Santos' cell phone. Garza arms himself with a revolver before heading to his daughter's room, after hearing that Ava tells him to meet her there.

Fearing to wake his daughter, Garza surrenders his gun and finally confesses to Ava that he was responsible for Derek's disappearance, and that Derek is dead. Garza admits that what he has done was very wrong, and explains that he owed the Doctor a favour after the doctor had performed an illegal abortion on Garza's pregnant underage girlfriend. When Ava asks again about her husband's death, Garza explains that Derek had bled to death; whilst resetting Derek's broken bones Elbar had punctured his femoral artery. After failing to save Derek's life , Garza was begged by Elbar to lie to the rest of the staff and witnesses that Derek didn't make it to the hospital, as well as to silence Ava, otherwise his clinic would be forced to close. Feeling bad for what he has done, Garza commits suicide off-screen before Ava is seen leaving, a trail of bloody footprints on the floor.

She is comforted by Manny at his mothers house and rests there. In the morning gains access to the hospital by taking the ID and car of a nurse arriving for work . Inside, Ava roughly interrogates Doctor Elbar about what happened to Derek. Elbar tells Ava to look at the surveillance screens. To her surprise Ava sees that Derek is alive and being brought into the hospital in a wheechair,. She is shocked and infuriated by all the lies. Meanwhile, the group escorting Derek reach the surgery where Ava has disguised herself as a nurse . In the operating theatre, Ava attempts to sedate Lugo before pulling out a gun and killing most of his men before getting Derek back on his feet. Lugo explains that he is suffering from a rare cancer. He has bribed Elbar to find donors with compatible bone marrow for transplant to help suppress his cancer, and Derek happens to be a suitable donor. Ava and Derek make their way out of the clinic, getting caught up in a gun fight with Lugo's men in the hospital's corridors. They are helped to escape from Lugo and his henchmen by Manny and groups of local children using all sorts of diversionary tactics. Lugo hunts her through the local village but Ava is able to win the fight and captures Lugo, holding a knife to his neck. Big Biz arrives. He takes the knife from Ava and cuts Lugo's throat, killing him. He then tells the crowd that things are going to improve now that Silvio Lugo is dead and that Ava and her husband must leave the island and go home. Ava and her husband leave the island on a boat as the film ends.

== Cast ==
- Gina Carano as Ava Grant, the 26-year-old lead character, who's trying to find her husband.
  - Paloma Olympia Louvat as Young Ava at 14 in the film's prologue and flashbacks.
- Cam Gigandet as Derek Grant, Ava's husband who goes missing on their honeymoon.
- Ismael Cruz Córdova as Manny, a young local who befriends Ava and Derek.
- Luis Guzmán as Chief Ramón Garza, the officer in charge of investigating Derek's disappearance.
- Treat Williams as Robert Grant, Derek's father, who disapproves of Ava.
- Amaury Nolasco as Silvio Lugo, a local crime figure.
- Stephen Lang as Casey, Ava's father, who appears in flashbacks.
- Danny Trejo as "Big Biz", a local crime figure.

== Production ==
The film was shot in Puerto Rico from November 25 to December 26, 2012.

== Release ==
In the Blood premiered in the United States on April 4, 2014, through a limited theatrical release and video on demand before coming out on home video two months later. Internationally, the film received a theatrical release in countries such as Vietnam, Kuwait, Singapore, Estonia, Lithuania, Latvia, Ukraine, the Philippines and Japan while coming out direct-to-video in the United Kingdom, France, the Netherlands and Germany and premiering on television in Spain.

== Reception ==
Review aggregator website Rotten Tomatoes gave the film an approval rating of 38% based on 40 reviews and an average rating of 5/10.

Variety's Ben Kenigsberg called the film a "serviceable action vehicle", while on the other hand, Nick Schager in The Village Voice described it as a "subpar action movie", that is "grim" and "formulaic", while singling out Gina Carano's "badass-beauty charm". In The New York Times, Andy Webster also praised Gina Carano but lamented that she was "trapped in B-film depths", hoping that someone would "give her a better script and director". Writing for the New York Daily News however, Elizabeth Weitzman was more critical of Carano, stating that while "an undeniably impressive force" she was "not convincing" as an actress, but noted that the film had "a strong supporting cast, some pretty scenery and a taut mystery". Brian Tallerico from RogerEbert.com gave the film one star out of four, writing that the "film history is filled with xenophobic tales of pretty Americans who disappear in foreign lands and the pretty people tasked with finding them".
