= Settlers (film) =

2021 British science fiction thriller film

- Film poster
- Directed by: Wyatt Rockefeller
- Screenplay by: Wyatt Rockefeller
- Produced by: Julie Fabrizio; Joshua Horsfield; Johan Kruger; Jason Mandl; Kenny Moleme
- Starring: Sofia Boutella; Ismael Cruz Córdova; Brooklynn Prince; Nell Tiger Free; Jonny Lee Miller
- Cinematography: Willie Nel
- Edited by: Johnny Daukes
- Music by: Nitin Sawhney
- Production companies: Jericho Motion Pictures; Intake Films; Brittle Star Pictures; 42
- Distributed by: Vertigo Releasing
- Release dates: 18 June 2021 (Tribeca); 23 July 2021 (United Kingdom)
- Running time: 103 minutes
- Country: United Kingdom
- Language: English
- Box office: $29,183

Settlers is a 2021 British science fiction thriller film written and directed by Wyatt Rockefeller.

It had its world premiere at the Tribeca Film Festival on 18 June 2021. It was released on 23 July 2021 in the United States by IFC Midnight.

== Plot ==
A small family in a lonely outpost on Mars is attacked by bandits. One of the bandits, Jerry, survives and kills the family father. He attempts to integrate into the family, demanding thirty days to prove himself to the survivors, mother Ilsa and her daughter Remmy. Over time, Ilsa seems to warm to him, but after thirty days, Ilsa tries to shoot him. She fails as the magazine of the gun that Jerry intentionally left was empty, and Jerry kills her in the ensuing struggle. Remmy, who resents Jerry's presence, grows sullen and spends much of her time with "Steve", a pet-like robot found in a storage unit. Remmy also discovers that their farm is within a large force field bubble that keeps breathable air inside. This makes clear that the bandits came from outside or another similarly shielded area.

Years pass, and Remmy, now a young woman, remains sullen and almost completely silent around Jerry. They have an argument over whether to have a child, and Remmy decides to run away, but Jerry stops her from doing so. He ties her up and attempts to rape her, but Steve blasts Jerry in the neck with its power-drilling attachment. Remmy frees herself and kills Jerry. Now alone, she decides to depart, leaving Steve to tend the outpost.

== Cast ==
- Sofia Boutella as Ilsa
- Ismael Cruz Córdova as Jerry
- Brooklynn Prince as Younger Remmy
  - Nell Tiger Free as Older Remmy
- Jonny Lee Miller as Reza
- Natalie Walsh as Female Stranger
- Matthew Van Leeve as Male Stranger

== Release ==
In April 2021, IFC Midnight acquired U.S. distribution rights to the film. The film had its world premiere at the Tribeca Film Festival on 18 June 2021. It was released on 23 July 2021.

== Reception ==
On the review aggregator website Rotten Tomatoes, the film holds an approval rating of 57% based on 58 reviews, with an average rating of 5.9/10. The site's critical consensus reads, "Settlers is serious to a fault, but viewers seeking a non-sensationalistic look at space colonization may find this a rewarding voyage." On Metacritic, the film has a weighted average score of 56 out of 100, based on 15 critics, indicating "mixed or average reviews".

== See also ==
- List of films set on Mars
