= Nell Tiger Free =

English actress (born 1999)

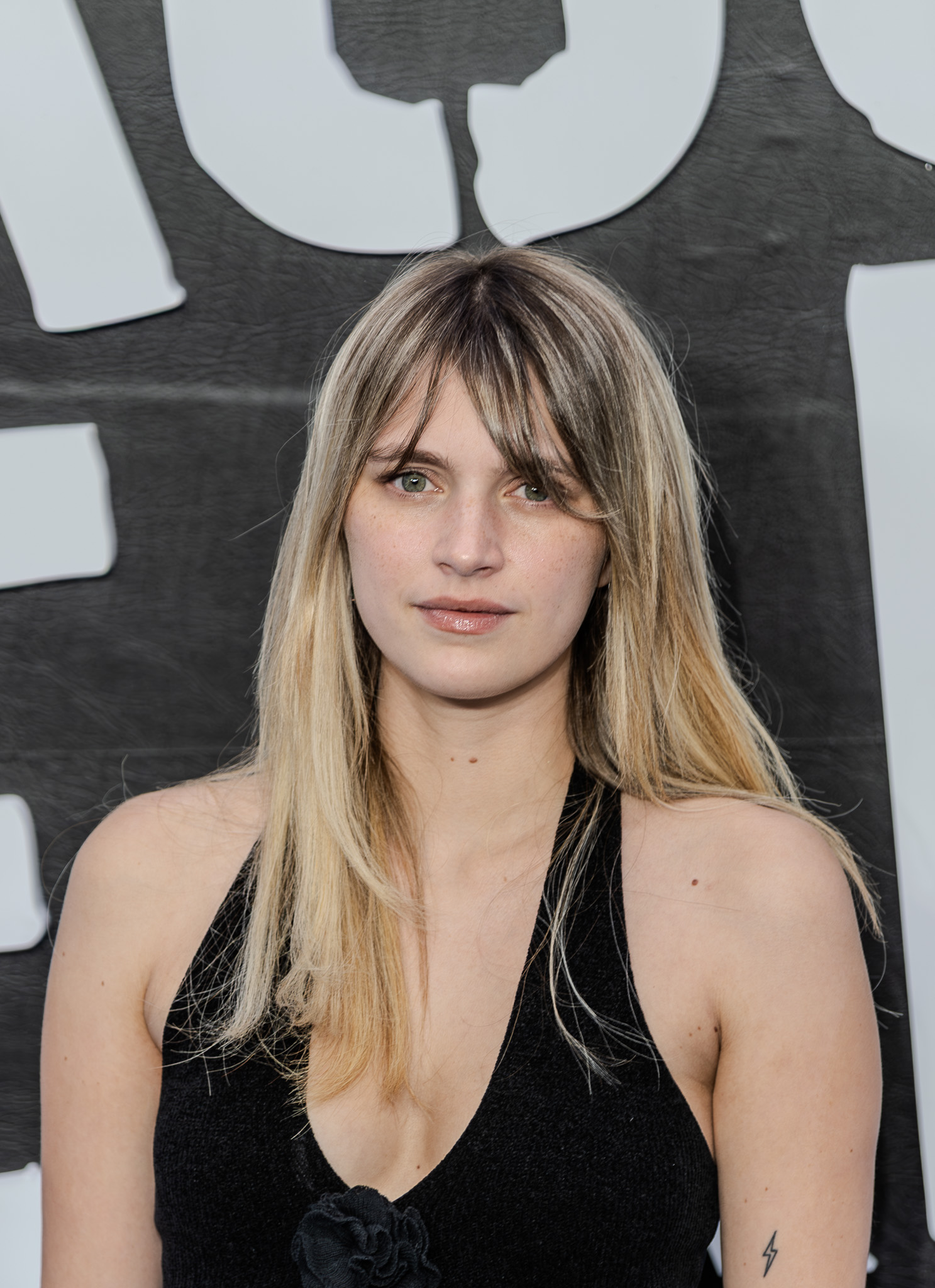
- Nell Tiger Free at the Caught Stealing premiere, London 2025
- Born: 13 October 1999 (age 26); Kingston upon Thames, London, England
- Occupations: Actress, singer
- Years active: 2012–present

Nell Tiger Free (born 13 October 1999) is an English actress and singer. She began her career as a child actress in the films Mr Stink and Broken (both 2012). She also played Myrcella Baratheon in seasons 5 and 6 of the HBO series Game of Thrones (2015–2016). She has since starred in the Apple TV+ series Servant (2019–2023), the Amazon Prime series Too Old to Die Young (2019) and the movies Settlers (2021) and The First Omen (2024).

== Early life ==
Free was born in Kingston upon Thames, London on 13 October 1999. Her father works in recruitment and her mother is a yoga teacher. She has an older sister. She explains that her middle name of Tiger was given to her because "being pregnant with me felt like carrying a tiger. I guess I was fierce and restless in there."

Free was educated at Teddington School. She began acting while attending Saturday drama class, where she was scouted for her first audition. She explained, "I was driving my mother insane. I had way too much energy as an 11-year-old. So she took me to a Saturday club where I could run around and sing and dance and act."

== Career ==
=== 2012–2018: Career beginnings ===
Free began her career in 2012 with small television roles in Mr Stink and Endeavour, and a small part in the British coming-of-age drama Broken. In 2014, Free was cast as Myrcella Baratheon in Game of Thrones, replacing Aimee Richardson. Prior to her audition, Free had never seen the show; when talking about the role, she said: "I mean, it's every girls dream to play a princess and the dresses were fantastic."

Free starred in Wonderwell, which featured Carrie Fisher in her final performance prior to her death in 2016. The film was released in 2023. In 2017, she joined the cast of Too Old to Die Young, a television series by Nicolas Winding Refn.

=== 2019–present: International breakthrough ===
In August 2018, Free was cast as Leanne Grayson in M. Night Shyamalan's television series Servant. The show received widespread critical acclaim, including from the likes of Stephen King, and Free's performance was lauded alongside the show's other lead cast members Lauren Ambrose and Rupert Grint.

Free made her shift to more movie roles with the 2021 film Settlers, where she played the older version of Brooklynn Prince's character as part of a family who are among the first settlers of Mars. The film premiered at the Tribeca Film Festival.

In August 2022, she was cast as Margaret in the 2024 horror film The First Omen, marking her first lead role in a feature film. She said in 2024, "M. Night [Shyamalan] definitely nourished me to be able to come and do roles like this. I always say I don't think I could have played Margaret when I was 19. I couldn't have walked on and done it in the way that, hopefully, I've done it now."

== Personal life ==
Free is friends with Sebastian Croft, her co-star on Game of Thrones and Wonderwell.

Free posts covers of songs and original music on Instagram. She was in a band named Your Parents. She released her first commercial song as a solo artist titled "Do I Just Keep Making Things Worse?" on October 25, 2024. Her extended play Nell Has a Breakdown is due to be released in the future.

== Filmography ==
=== Film ===
Year	Title	Role	Notes
2012	Broken	Anna	
2021	Settlers	Older Remmy	
2023	Wonderwell	Savannah	
2024	The First Omen	Margaret Daino	
2027	Cliffhanger	Sydney Cooper	Post-production

=== Television ===
Year	Title	Role	Notes
2012	Mr Stink	Chloe Crumb	Television film
2014	Endeavour	Bunty Glossop	Episode: "Nocturne"
2015–2016	Game of Thrones	Myrcella Baratheon	Recurring role (seasons 5–6), 6 episodes
2019	Too Old to Die Young	Janey Carter	Main role
2019–2023	Servant	Leanne Grayson	Television series; main role

== Discography ==
=== As part of Your Parents ===
Year	Title	Composers	Producers
2021	"Ghost"	Your Parents (Dylan Woosey, Joe Nolan, Nell Tiger Free)	Tim Bran
2021	"Versions of Evil"	Your Parents (Dylan Woosey, Joe Nolan, Nell Tiger Free)	

=== As a solo artist ===
Year	Title	Composers	Producers
2024	"Do I Just Keep Making Things Worse?"	Nell Tiger Free, Tim Bran	Tim Bran

== Awards and nominations ==
Year	Award	Category	Nominated work	Result
2022	Saturn Awards	Best Supporting Actress in a Streaming Television Series	Servant	Nominated
2024	Fangoria Chainsaw Awards	Best Lead Performance	The First Omen	Nominated
