= Oliver Leith =

British composer

- Born: 1990 (age 34–35); United Kingdom
- Genres: Classical, electronic
- Occupation(s): Musician, composer
- Instrument(s): Piano, keyboards, percussion, strings
- Years active: 2009–Present
- Website: https://oliverchristopheleith.com/

Oliver Leith (born 1990) is a British composer of classical and electronic music. His work has been commissioned and performed by many international ensembles including Apartment House, BBC Symphony Orchestra, Plus Minus and Philharmonia Orchestra. He was appointed Doctoral Composer-in-Residence at the Royal Opera House in 2019.

== Education and career ==
Leith studied at the Guildhall School of Music and Drama (2009–2015), where his teachers included Julian Philips and Paul Newland.

His music has been performed at music venues including the Royal Festival Hall, the Barbican Centre, Wigmore Hall, Kings Place and Snape Maltings.

His music has been broadcast by BBC Radio 3.

In October 2022, Leith's debut opera, Last Days premiered at the Linbury Theatre. It was a co-production between the Royal Opera House and the Guildhall School of Music and Drama. The title and concept for the opera were taken from the 2005 film of the same name by Gus van Sant, which was a fictionalised account of the last days of Kurt Cobain. The opera received generally positive coverage, with 4 star reviews in The Guardian and Financial Times.

== Recordings ==
His work has been commissioned and performed by international ensembles including Explore Ensemble, Apartment House, BBC Symphony Orchestra, the Ives Ensemble, EXAUDI, 12 Ensemble, GBSR Duo, The Hermes Experiment, Plus Minus and Philharmonia Orchestra.

A recording of Leith's 45-minute piano and percussion piece good day good day bad day bad day was issued by UK experimental music label Another Timbre in 2020, performed by GBSR Duo. The album was chosen as a pick of the week by The Guardian, who described it as having "moments of unexpected grandeur alongside sheer banality, yet somehow the mixture is curiously addictive." The album was also chosen as a highlight of 2020 by BBC Radio 3's New Music Show.

Other releases of Leith's music include Medusa, released by Accidental Records in 2020, and Balloon, released by the label SN Variations, again in 2020.

In January 2020, 12 Ensemble performed "Honey Siren - II. (Full like drips)" by Leith.

In July 2020, The Hermes Experiment released an album called HERE WE ARE featuring a composition by Leith.

In May 2024, A. G. Cook’s third studio album, Britpop, was released featuring a two-minute track called Butterfly Craft, composed by Leith.

== Awards ==
Leith is a recipient of Royal Philharmonic Society Composition Prize in 2014, British Composer Award in 2016, and Ivor Novello Award in 2020. His work "Hallelujah Amen" for mixed voices was nominated for an Ivor Novello Award at The Ivors Classical Awards 2024 in the Best Choral Composition category.

== Personal life ==
Leith lives in Islington. In 2020, he joined a crowd of protestors and posted a photo of himself brandishing an obscene gesture outside the family home of Dominic Cummings, following revelations that the latter had breached COVID-19 lockdown restrictions.
