= Kandisha (2020 film) =

2020 horror film

- French film poster
- Directed by: Alexandre Bustillo; Julien Maury
- Written by: Alexandre Bustillo; Julien Maury
- Produced by: Wassim Béji; Delphine Clot; Guillaume Lemans
- Starring: Mériem Sarolie; Walid Afkir; Suzy Bemba; Bakary Diombera; Sandor Funtek; Mathilde Lamusse; Félix Glaux-Delporto
- Cinematography: Simon Roca
- Edited by: Baxter
- Music by: Raf Keunen
- Production companies: Esprits Frappeurs; WY Production
- Release date: October 16, 2020 (Sitges)
- Running time: 85 minutes
- Country: France
- Language: French

Kandisha is a French horror film directed and written by Alexandre Bustillo and Julien Maury. The film stars Mériem Sarolie, Walid Afkir, Suzy Bemba, Bakary Diombera, Mathilde Lamusse, Félix Glaux-Delporto and Sandor Funtek. It focuses on a teenage girl who must fight to protect her younger brother, with help from her two friends, from the wraith of a Moroccan figure from folklore she has inadvertently summoned.

== Plot ==
Three teenage childhood friends invoke the spirit of Aïsha Kandisha, the avenging creature of a Moroccan legend. When one of them, Amélie, suffers at the hands of a former boyfriend, she asks Kandisha to punish him. The seemingly innocent game turns into a nightmare when Kandisha, not satisfied with only one sacrifice, starts venting her rage on any male she comes across, including their nearest and dearest family members. The three friends must now do everything possible to stop an evil who wants to be reborn by using one of them as a human host. Thus, Amélie and her friends seek an Islamic father-and-son team of spiritualists for help, as Kandisha herself has set her sights on Amélie's younger brother Antoine.

== Cast ==
- Mathilde Lamusse as Amélie
- Suzy Bemba as Bintou
- Samarcande Saadi as Morjana
- Mériem Sarolie as Aisha Kandisha
  - Maria José Cazares Godoy as Aisha Kandisha (early stage)
  - Brahim Takioullah as Demon Aisha Kandisha
- Sandor Funtek as Erwan
- Walid Afkir as Rector
- Félix Glaux-Delporto as Antoine
- Nassim Lyes as Abdel
- Dylan Krief as Ben
- Bakary Diombera as Ako
- Mariam Doumbia as Amimata
- Brahim Hadrami as Farid
- Lotfi Yahya Jedidi as imam Ahmed Ibn Fahlan

== Production ==
Filming took place in Belgium in June and July 2019.

== Release ==
The film had its world premiere in the Oficial Fantàstic Competición section at the Sitges Film Festival on October 16, 2020.

== Reception ==
On the review aggregator website Rotten Tomatoes, 79% of 33 critics' reviews are positive. The website's consensus reads: "Although Kandisha engages unevenly with its more thought-provoking aspects, it remains viscerally effective as a memorably brutal slasher." Metacritic, which uses a weighted average, assigned the film a score of 59 out of 100, based on 4 critics, indicating "mixed or average" reviews.
