= Catherine Corsini =

French filmmaker

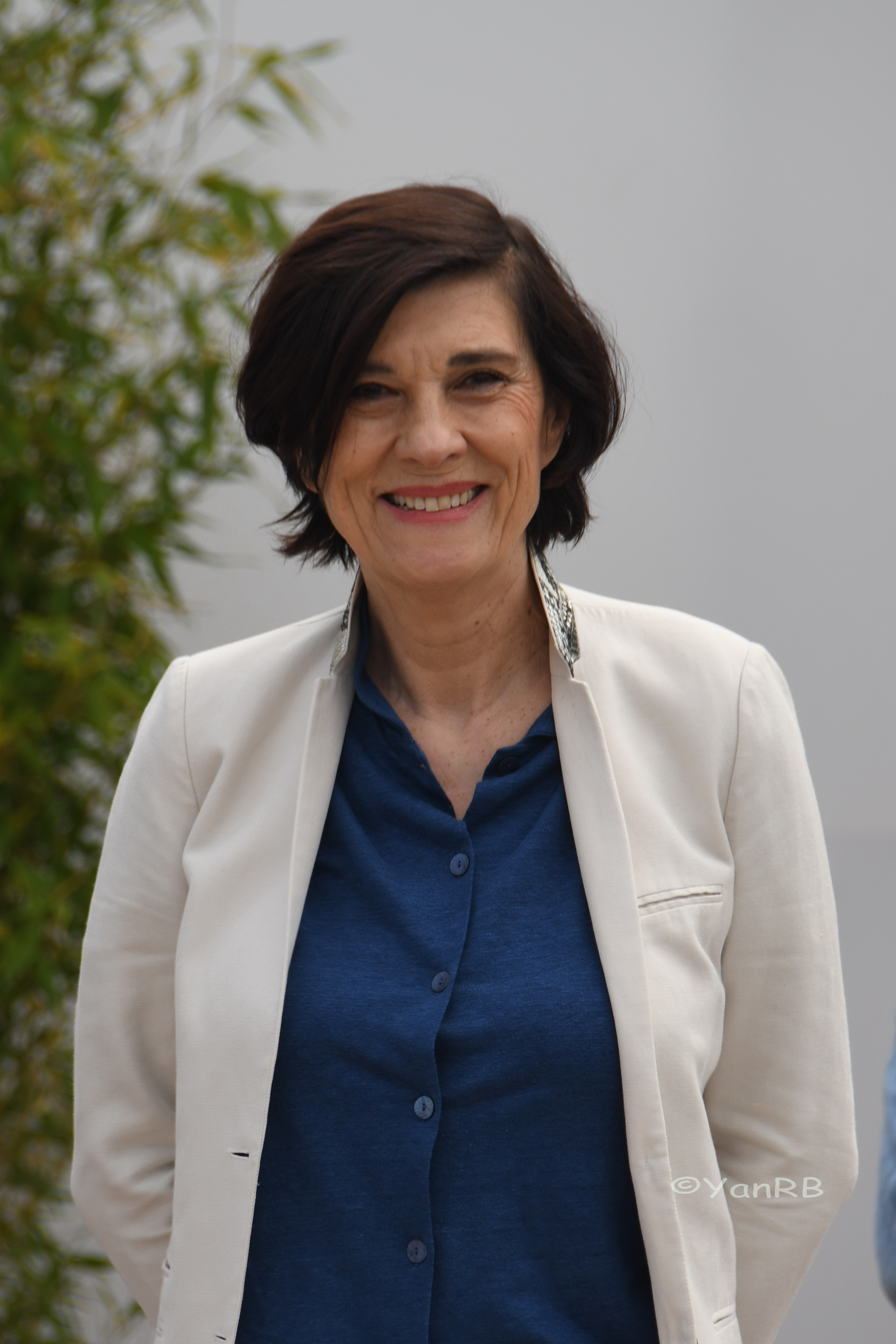
- Corsini at the 2023 Cannes Film Festival
- Born: 18 May 1956 (age 70); Dreux, France
- Occupations: Film director; screenwriter; actress
- Years active: 1982–present

Catherine Corsini (born 18 May 1956) is a French film director, screenwriter, and actress. Her film Replay was entered into the 2001 Cannes Film Festival. Her 2012 film Three Worlds competed in the Un Certain Regard section at the 2012 Cannes Film Festival.

In April 2016, she was announced as the president of the jury for the Caméra d'Or prize at the 2016 Cannes Film Festival. Corsini is partners with Elisabeth Perez, who has been a producer on some of her projects.

== Filmography ==
Year	Title	Credited as			Notes
Year	Title	Director	Screenwriter	Actress	Notes
1982	La Mésange	Yes	Yes		Short film
1983	Ballades	Yes	Yes		Short film
1986	Nuit de Chine	Yes	Yes		Short film
1987	Poker	Yes	Yes	Yes	
1987	Marie Pervenche			Yes	TV series
1991	Haute tension	Yes			TV series
1992	Interdit d'amour	Yes	Yes		Telefilm
1993	L'Exposé			Yes	Short film
1994	Lovers	Yes	Yes		
1996	Full Speed		Yes		
1996	Youth Without God	Yes			Telefilm
1998	Denis	Yes	Yes		Telefilm
1999	The New Eve	Yes	Yes		
2001	Replay	Yes	Yes		Competition—Palme d'Or (Cannes Film Festival)
2001	Don't Make Trouble!	Yes			Segment: "Mohamed"
2003	The Very Merry Widows	Yes	Yes		
2006	Les Ambitieux	Yes	Yes		
2006	Hotel Harabati			Yes	
2008	Born in 68		Yes		
2009	Partir (Leaving)	Yes	Yes		
2009	La Poudre d'escampette	Yes	Yes		TV short
2012	Three Worlds	Yes	Yes		Bayard d'Or for Best Screenplay; Pristina International Film Festival Award for Best Film; Nominated—Prix Un Certain Regard (Cannes Film Festival)
2015	Summertime	Yes	Yes		Locarno International Film Festival - Variety Piazza Grande Award; Trophées du Film français - Duo cinéma Nominated—Lumière Award for Best Director; Nominated—Lumière Award for Best Screenplay
2018	Un amour impossible	Yes	Yes		
2021	The Divide	Yes	Yes		Competition—Palme d'Or (Cannes Film Festival)
2023	Homecoming	Yes	Yes		Competition—Palme d'Or (Cannes Film Festival)

== See also ==
- List of female film and television directors
- List of lesbian filmmakers
- List of LGBT-related films directed by women
