= 72nd Sydney Film Festival =

2025 film festival

- Opening film: Together by Michael Shanks
- Closing film: Splitsville by Michael Angelo Covino
- Location: Sydney, New South Wales, Australia
- Founded: 1954
- Festival date: 4–15 June 2025
- Website: sff.org.au

Sydney Film Festival
- 73rd 71st

The 72nd annual Sydney Film Festival took place from 4 to 15 June 2025. This edition of the Sydney Film Festival opened with supernatural body horror film Together and closed with Michael Angelo Covino's comedy film Splitsville.

== Jury ==
The following were named as members of the festival jury:

- Justin Kurzel, Australian film director – jury president
- Rachel House, New Zealand director and actor
- Mélita Toscan du Plantier, French producer
- Winnie Tsang, Hong Kong producer and distributor
- Thomas Weatherall, Australian actor

== Official Selection ==
=== In competition ===
The following films were selected for the main international competition:

English title	Original title	Director(s)	Production country
All That's Left of You	اللي باقي منك	Cherien Dabis	Germany, Cyprus, Palestine, Jordan, Greece, Qatar, Saudi Arabia
The Blue Trail	O Último Azul	Gabriel Mascaro	Brazil, Mexico, Netherlands, Chile
DJ Ahmet		Georgi M. Unkovski	North Macedonia, Czech Republic, Serbia, Croatia
It Was Just an Accident	یک تصادف ساده	Jafar Panahi	Iran, France, Luxembourg
The Love That Remains	Ástin Sem Eftir Er	Hlynur Pálmason	Iceland, Sweden, Denmark, France
The Mastermind		Kelly Reichardt	United States
Miroirs No. 3		Christian Petzold	Germany
My Father's Shadow		Akinola Davies Jr.	United Kingdom, Nigeria
Romería		Carla Simón	Spain, Germany
The Secret Agent	O Agente Secreto	Kleber Mendonça Filho	Brazil, France, Netherlands, Germany
Sorry, Baby		Eva Victor	United States
Together (opening film)		Michael Shanks	Australia, United States

Highlighted title indicates Sydney Film Prize winner.

=== Late Announce ===
The following films were added two days before the festival started:

English title	Original title	Director(s)	Production country
Eagles of the Republic		Tarik Saleh	Denmark, Finland, France, Sweden
It's Never Over, Jeff Buckley		Amy J. Berg	United States
The Little Sister	La Petite Dernière	Hafsia Herzi	France, Germany
Magellan		Lav Diaz	Portugal, Spain, France, Philippines, Taiwan
The Plague		Charlie Polinger	United States, Romania
Sentimental Value		Joachim Trier	Norway, France, Germany, Denmark, Sweden, United Kingdom
Sirāt		Óliver Laxe	France, Spain
Splitsville (closing film)		Michael Angelo Covino	United States
Two Prosecutors		Sergei Loznitsa	France, Germany, Netherlands, Latvia, Romania, Lithuania
Young Mothers	Jeunes mères	Jean-Pierre and Luc Dardenne	Belgium, France

=== Documentary Australia ===
English title	Original title	Director(s)	Production country
Deeper		Jennifer Peedom	Australia
Ellis Park		Justin Kurzel	Australia
Floodland		Jordan Giusti	Australia
The Golden Spurtle		Constantine Costi	Australia, United Kingdom
Joh: Last King of Queensland		Kriv Stenders	Australia
Journey Home, David Gulpilil		Maggie Miles, Trisha Morton-Thomas	Australia
The Raftsmen		Chadden Hunter	Australia
Songs Inside		Shalom Almond	Australia
The Wolves Always Come at Night		Gabrielle Brady	Australia, Mongolia, Germany
Yurlu | Country		Yaara Bou Melhem	Australia

=== First Nations Award ===
English title	Original title	Director(s)	Production country
Emily: I Am Kam		Danielle MacLean	Australia
The Haka Party Incident		Katie Wolfe	New Zealand
Marlon Williams: Two Worlds – Ngā Ao E Rua		Ursula Grace Williams	New Zealand
Nechako: It Will Be a Big River Again		Lyana Patrick	Canada
Remaining Native		Paige Bethmann	United States
Seeds		Kaniehtiio Horn	Canada
Wilfred Buck		Lisa Jackson	Canada

=== Special Presentations ===
English title	Original title	Director(s)	Production country
The Ballad of Wallis Island		James Griffiths	United Kingdom
Blue Moon		Richard Linklater	United States, Ireland
Dreams		Michel Franco	Mexico, United States
Enzo		Robin Campillo	France, Belgium, Italy
How to Train Your Dragon		Dean DeBlois	United States
Lesbian Space Princess		Emma Hough Hobbs, Leela Varghese	Australia
One to One: John & Yoko		Kevin Macdonald	United Kingdom
Orwell: 2+2=5		Raoul Peck	France, United States
Pike River		Robert Sarkies	New Zealand
Prime Minister		Lindsay Utz, Michelle Walshe	United States
A Private Life	Vie privée	Rebecca Zlotowski	France
Slanted		Amy Wang	United States
Twinless		James Sweeney	United States

=== Features ===
English title	Original title	Director(s)	Production country
Alpha.		Jan-Willem van Ewijk	Netherlands, Switzerland, Slovenia
Birthright		Zoe Pepper	Australia
BLKNWS: Terms & Conditions		Kahlil Joseph	United States
Bring Them Down		Christopher Andrews	Ireland
Ciao Bambino		Edgardo Pistone	Italy
Come Closer		Tom Nesher	Italy
Daughter's Daughter	女兒的女兒	Huang Xi	Taiwan
Death of an Undertaker		Christian Byers	Australia
Dreams (Sex Love)	Drømmer	Dag Johan Haugerud	Norway
Eighty Plus	Restitucija, ili, San i java stare garde	Želimir Žilnik	Serbia, Slovenia
The End		Joshua Oppenheimer	Denmark, Germany, Ireland, Italy, United Kingdom, Sweden
The Friend		Scott McGehee and David Siegel	United States
Fwends		Sophie Somerville	Australia
Happyend		Neo Sora	Japan, United States
Harvest		Athina Rachel Tsangari	United Kingdom, Germany, Greece, France, United States
The Heart Is a Muscle		Imran Hamdulay	South Africa, Saudi Arabia
Islands		Jan-Ole Gerster	Germany
January 2	Január 2.	Zsófia Szilágyi	Hungary
Kontinental '25		Radu Jude	Romania
Late Shift	Heldin	Petra Volpe	Switzerland, Germany
The Legend of the Vagabond Queen of Lagos		The Agbajowo Collective	Nigeria, Germany, South Africa, United States
The Life of Chuck		Mike Flanagan	United States
Love	Kjærlighet	Dag Johan Haugerud	Norway
Lurker		Alex Russell	United States, Italy
The Mohican	Le Mohican	Frédéric Farrucci	France
Moon	Mond	Kurdwin Ayub	Austria
The Mother and the Bear		Johnny Ma	Canada, Chile
Mr Burton		Marc Evans	United Kingdom, Ireland
Nineteen	Diciannove	Giovanni Tortorici	Italy, United Kingdom
Olmo		Fernando Eimbcke	United States, Mexico
On Becoming a Guinea Fowl		Rungano Nyoni	Zambia, United Kingdom, Ireland
On Swift Horses		Daniel Minahan	United States
One of Those Days When Hemme Dies	Hemme'nin öldüğü günlerden biri	Murat Fıratoğlu	Turkey
Pooja, Sir		Deepak Rauniyar	Nepal, United States, Norway
The President's Cake	مملكة القصب	Hasan Hadi	Iraq, United States, Qatar
Saba		Maksud Hossain	Bangladesh
Somebody	침범	Kim Yeo-jeong, Lee Jeong-chan	South Korea
Spirit World		Eric Khoo	France, Japan, Singapore
State of Statelessness	ས་མཐའི་ལས་དབང་།	Tenzing Sonam, Ritu Sarin, Tsering Tashi Gyalthang, Sonam Tseten, Tenzin Tsetan Choklay	India, United States, Vietnam
Stranger Eyes		Yeo Siew Hua	Singapore, Taiwan, France, United States
The Things You Kill		Alireza Khatami	France, Poland, Canada, Turkey
Tiger's Pond	Vaghachipani	Natesh Hegde	India, Singapore
To Kill a Mongolian Horse		Xiaoxuan Jiang	Malaysia, Hong Kong, United States, South Korea, Japan, Singapore
Twelve Moons	Doce lunas	Victoria Franco	Mexico
Went Up the Hill		Samuel Van Grinsven	New Zealand, Australia
What Does That Nature Say to You	그 자연이 네게 뭐라고 하니	Hong Sang-soo	South Korea
Yunan		Ameer Fakher Eldin	Canada, Germany, Italy, Jordan, Palestine, Qatar

=== International Documentaries ===
English title	Original title	Director(s)	Production country
2000 Meters to Andriivka		Mstyslav Chernov	Ukraine, United States
Agatha's Almanac		Amalie Atkins	Canada
All I Had Was Nothingness	Je n'avais que le néant	Guillaume Ribot	France
Always	从来	Deming Chen	United States, France, China, Taiwan
André Is an Idiot		Tony Benna	United States
Assembly		Rashaad Newsome, Johnny Symons	United States
Beat the Lotto		Ross Whitaker	Ireland
Blue Road: The Edna O'Brien Story		Sinead O'Shea	Ireland, United Kingdom
Chain Reactions		Alexandre O. Philippe	United States
Come See Me in the Good Light		Ryan White	United States
Cutting Through Rocks	اوزاک یوللار	Sara Khaki, Mohammadreza Eyni	Iran, Germany, United States, Netherlands, Qatar, Chile, Canada
Exergue – on documenta 14		Dimitris Athiridis	Greece
Folktales		Heidi Ewing, Rachel Grady	United States, Norway
A Frown Gone Mad		Omar Mismar	Lebanon
How Deep Is Your Love		Eleanor Mortime	United Kingdom
How to Build a Library		Maia Lekow, Christopher King	Kenya, United States
Lowland Kids		Sandra Winther	Denmark, United States
Make It Look Real		Kate Blackmore	Australia
Mistress Dispeller		Elizabeth Lo	China, United States
Mr. Nobody Against Putin		David Borenstein	Denmark, Czech Republic
Only on Earth		Robin Petré	Denmark, Spain, Sweden
The Perfect Neighbor		Geeta Gandbhir	United States
Predators		David Osit	United States
The Shadow Scholars		Eloïse King	United Kingdom
The Shepherd and the Bear		Max Keegan	United Kingdom, United States, France
Silent Observers		Eliza Petkova	Bulgaria, Germany
Speak.		Jennifer Tiexiera, Guy Mossman	United States
Tokito: The 540-Day Journey of a Culinary Maverick		Aki Mizutani	Japan
Twiggy		Sadie Frost	United Kingdom
Unwelcomed	Si vas para Chile	Amilcar Infante, Sebastian Gonzalez Mendez	Chile
Videoheaven		Alex Ross Perry	United States
A Want in Her		Myrid Carten	Ireland, United Kingdom, Netherlands
Writing Hawa	La vie de Hawa	Najiba Noori, Rasul Noori	France, Netherlands, Qatar, Afghanistan
Yalla Parkour		Areeb Zuaiter	Sweden, Qatar, Saudi Arabia, Palestine

=== Focus on Nishtha Jain ===
The program highlighted the work by Indian director Nishtha Jain.

English title	Original title	Director(s)	Production country
Gulabi Gang (2012)		Nishtha Jain	Norway, India, Denmark
The Golden Thread (2022)	Paat Katha	Nishtha Jain	India, United Kingdom, Bosnia and Herzegovina, Norway, Netherlands
Farming the Revolution (2024)	Inqilab di Kheti	Nishtha Jain	India, France, Norway

=== Sounds on Screen ===
English title	Original title	Director(s)	Production country
Marlon Williams: Two Worlds – Ngā Ao E Rua		Ursula Grace Williams	New Zealand
Move Ya Body: The Birth of House		Elegance Bratton	United States
Once Upon a Time Michel Legrand	Il était une fois Michel Legrand	David Hertzog Dessites	France
Selena y Los Dinos		Isabel Castro	United States

=== Flux: Art+Film ===
English title	Original title	Director(s)	Production country
Ancestral Visions of the Future		Lemohang Jeremiah Mosese	France, Germany, Qatar, Saudi Arabia, Lesotho
Gods of Stone	Deuses de pedra	Iván Castiñeiras Gallego	Spain, France, Portugal
Invention		Courtney Stephens	United States
Listen to the Voices	Kouté vwa	Maxime Jean-Baptiste	France, Belgium, Guyana
The Unshakeable Destiny		Nikki Lam	Australia, Hong Kong

=== Freak Me Out ===
English title	Original title	Director(s)	Production country
Dangerous Animals		Sean Byrne	Australia
The Home	Hemmet	Mattias J. Skoglund	Sweden, Estonia, Iceland
It Ends		Alexander Ullom	United States
Obex		Albert Birney	United States
Redux Redux		Kevin McManus, Matthew McManus	United States
Straight On till Morning		Craig Ouellette	United States
The Wailing	El Llanto	Pedro Martín-Calero	Spain, France, Argentina

=== EUROPE! Voices of Women+ in Film ===
English title	Original title	Director(s)	Production country
Ari		Léonor Serraille	France, Belgium
Deaf	Sorda	Eva Libertad	Spain
Hanami		Denise Fernandes	Switzerland, Cape Verde, Portugal
I Shall See	Ik zal zien	Mercedes Stalenhoef	Netherlands
Little Trouble Girls	Kaj ti je deklica	Urška Djukić	Slovenia, Italy, Croatia, Serbia
Têtes Brûlées		Maja-Ajmia Yde Zellama	Belgium

=== Screenability ===
English title	Original title	Director(s)	Production country
Life After		Reid Davenport	United States
Marlee Matlin: Not Alone Anymore		Shoshannah Stern	United States
Racewalkers		Kevin Claydon, Phil Moniz	Canada

=== Family ===
English title	Original title	Director(s)	Production country
How to Train Your Dragon		Dean DeBlois	United States
Night of the Zoopocalypse		Ricardo Curtis, Rodrigo Perez-Castro	Canada, France, Belgium

=== Jafar Panahi: Cinema in Rebellion ===
The retrospective program highlighted the work by Iranian director Jafar Panahi.

English title	Original title	Director(s)	Production country
The White Balloon (1995)	بادکنک سفيد	Jafar Panahi	Iran
The Mirror (1997)	آینه	Jafar Panahi	Iran
The Circle (2000)	دایره	Jafar Panahi	Iran, Italy, Switzerland
Crimson Gold (2003)	طلای سرخ	Jafar Panahi	Iran
Offside (2006)	آفساید	Jafar Panahi	Iran
This Is Not a Film (2011)	این فیلم نیست	Jafar Panahi, Mojtaba Mirtahmasb	Iran
Closed Curtain (2013)	پرده	Jafar Panahi, Kambuzia Partovi	Iran
Tehran Taxi (2015)	تاکسی	Jafar Panahi	Iran
3 Faces (2018)	سه رخ	Jafar Panahi	Iran
No Bears (2022)	خرس نیست	Jafar Panahi	Iran
It Was Just an Accident (2025)	یک تصادف ساده	Jafar Panahi	Iran, France, Luxembourg

=== Elaine May: Urbane Legend ===
English title	Original title	Director(s)	Production country
A New Leaf (1971)		Elaine May	United States
The Heartbreak Kid (1972)		Elaine May	United States
Mikey and Nicky (1976)		Elaine May	United States
Ishtar (1987)		Elaine May	United States

=== Classics Restored ===
English title	Original title	Director(s)	Production country
Angel's Egg (1985)	天使のたまご	Mamoru Oshii	Japan
The Mahabharata (1989)		Peter Brook	France, United Kingdom, United States
Mullet (2001)		David Caesar	Australia
Muriel's Wedding (1994)		P. J. Hogan	Australia
Somersault (2004)		Cate Shortland	Australia

== Awards ==
The following awards were presented at the festival:

- Sydney Film Prize: It Was Just an Accident (یک تصادف ساده) — Jafar Panahi
- Documentary Australia Award: Songs Inside — Shalom Almond
- First Nations Award: Wilfred Buck
- Sustainable Future Award: Floodland
- Dendy Awards for Australian Short Films:
  - Best Live Action Short: Faceless
  - Rouben Mamoulin Award for Best Director: Rory Pearson for Mates
  - Yoram Gross Animation Award: The Fling
  - AFTRS Crafts Award: Josh Peters, Music and Sound Design for Faceless
  - Event Cinemas Rising Talent Award for Screenwriting: Rory Pearson and Marcus Aldred-Traynor for Mates
- GIO Audience Awards:
  - Best Australian Feature: Lesbian Space Princess
  - Best Australian Feature, Runner up: Birthright
  - Best Australian Documentary: The Raftsmen
  - Best Australian Documentary, Runner up: The Golden Spurtle
  - Best International Feature: All That's Left of You
  - Best International Feature, Runner up: DJ Ahmet
  - Best International Documentary: Prime Minister
  - Best International Documentary, Runner up: Cutting Through Rocks
