= Online Film Critics Society Award for Special Achievement =

The Online Film Critics Society Award for Special Achievement is an annual film award given by the Online Film Critics Society.

== Special Awards (1999, 2012-Present) ==
=== 1999 ===
- Internet Movie Database

=== 2011 ===
- To Jessica Chastain, the breakout performer of the year
- To Martin Scorsese, in honor of his work and dedication to the pursuit of film preservation

=== 2012 ===
- Career Achievement Award: Ennio Morricone
- To "For the Love of Film" bloggers and Fandor – in conjunction with the National Film Preservation Foundation – for making the surviving portion of the silent film – “The White Shadow” – available for free online viewing throughout the world. the film is significant as work by Alfred Hitchcock just prior to his directorial debut. the preservation and presentation were made possible primarily by the community of online film critics.
- To Mojtaba Mirtahmasb & Jafar Panahi – for making This Is Not a Film as a vital act of protest against the Iranian authorities.

=== 2013 ===
- Best Sound Design: Gravity
- Best Visual Effects: Gravity
- To Roger Ebert, for inspiring so many of our members
