= Life (2021 film) =

2021 Iranian short film directed by Jafar Panahi

- Directed by: Jafar Panahi
- Written by: Jafar Panahi
- Produced by: Jafar Panahi
- Starring: Mokarameh Saidi Balsini, Tahereh Saidi Balsini, Solmaz Panahi, Jafar Panahi
- Distributed by: Neon
- Release date: 2021
- Running time: 20 minutes
- Country: Iran
- Language: Persian

Life is a 2021 short film by Iranian filmmaker Jafar Panahi. The 20‑minute film was first released as part of the anthology The Year of the Everlasting Storm, made during the COVID-19 pandemic. It shows a visit by Panahi’s mother to his home during lockdown. In December 2025, the film received its public online release by Neon as a standalone short.

== Plot summary ==
The film shows a day in Jafar Panahi’s home during the COVID‑19 pandemic. His mother visits him, and her interactions with the family and their pet iguana, Iggy, make up the short. It is preceded by a recorded conversation between Panahi and Martin Scorsese.

== Cast and crew ==
=== Cast ===
- Mokarameh Saidi Balsini
- Tahereh Saidi Balsini
- Solmaz Panahi
- Jafar Panahi
- Iggy (pet iguana)

=== Crew ===
- Director: Jafar Panahi
- Camera: Jafar Panahi, Tahereh Saidi Balsini
- Sound Editing: Mohammad Reza Delpak
- Music: Shahram Shafii

== Background ==
The film’s online release came at a time when Jafar Panahi was facing legal restrictions and a prison sentence in absentia in Iran. Some coverage of the release suggested that Life took on added significance in light of Panahi’s long-running clashes with state censorship and his persistence in making films despite repeated bans and arrests.

== Production ==
Life is a 20‑minute short film made in 2021. Panahi filmed the short inside his apartment in Tehran during the COVID‑19 lockdown. According to the National Museum of Contemporary Art in Athens (EMST), he and his wife, Tahereh Saidi Balsini, used their cell phones to capture everyday moments at home, mixing real life with a few staged scenes. The film also features the family’s pet iguana, Iggy.

== Release ==
The film premiered as part of the anthology feature The Year of the Everlasting Storm at the 2021 Cannes Film Festival. It was screened at the Docaviv Film Festival in 2022. The online release of Life included a portion of Jafar Panahi's public conversation with Martin Scorsese at the 63rd New York Film Festival in October 2025.

== Reception ==
Richard Brody of The New Yorker wrote that Life is the anthology’s best film, highlighting its blend of documentary and fiction, its simple home‑shot style, and the way it turns small moments of family life during lockdown into something meaningful.

Mike D'Angelo of The A.V. Club described Life as the strongest of the anthology’s documentary segments. He noted its link to Panahi’s earlier film This Is Not a Film and pointed to scenes of Panahi’s mother visiting in a full‑body protective suit and her uneasy encounters with the family iguana, Iggy. D’Angelo wrote that these moments lead to a warm conclusion.

The Austin Chronicle’s Richard Whittaker called Life the anthology’s opening and most charming segment, observing Panahi’s mother arriving in a full‑body protective suit and expressing discomfort with the family’s freely roaming pet lizard.

Ben Kenigsberg of The New York Times described Panahi’s segment as one of the anthology’s highlights, calling it a sweet, minor document built around a cautious visit from his mother. He pointed to the gentle humor in her arrival in protective gear and her brief encounters with Panahi’s pet iguana, Iggy.

According to The Playlist’s Charles Bramesco, Panahi’s segment continues his recent home‑shot work, capturing small moments with his iguana and a brief visit from his mother during the city’s restrictions. The review notes the contrast between the quiet inside his apartment and the unrest outside, describing the short as a quiet look at confinement and resilience.

Jake Cole of Slant Magazine wrote that Life stands out among the anthology’s segments, describing it as a lighter companion to Panahi’s earlier home‑shot works and noting the ending in which his mother, dressed in protective gear, gradually warms up to the family iguana.

The South China Morning Post’s James Mottram noted that Life opens the anthology with scenes from Panahi’s home during the pandemic, showing his mother arriving in full PPE and a sense of fear running through their conversation.

Steve Pond of The Wrap described Life as a playful vignette set in Panahi’s home during the pandemic. He highlighted scenes involving Panahi’s pet iguana, his mother arriving in a hazmat suit, and the director’s everyday routines, calling the segment both a humorous look at daily life and a serious reflection on the past year.
