= It Was Just an Accident =

2025 thriller film by Jafar Panahi

- French theatrical release poster
- Persian: یک تصادف ساده
- Directed by: Jafar Panahi
- Written by: Jafar Panahi
- Produced by: Jafar Panahi; Philippe Martin
- Starring: Vahid Mobasseri; Mariam Afshari; Ebrahim Azizi; Hadis Pakbaten; Majid Panahi; Mohamad Ali Elyasmehr; Delnaz Najafi; Afssaneh Najmabadi; Georges Hashemzadeh
- Cinematography: Amin Jafari
- Edited by: Amir Etminan
- Production companies: Jafar Panahi Productions; Les Films Pelléas; Bidibul Productions; Pio & Co; Arte France Cinéma
- Distributed by: Memento Distribution (France)
- Release dates: 20 May 2025 (Cannes); 1 October 2025 (France)
- Running time: 104 minutes
- Countries: Iran; France; Luxembourg
- Languages: Persian; Azerbaijani
- Box office: $10.5 million

It Was Just an Accident (Persian: یک تصادف ساده, romanized: Yek tasādof-e sāde; French: Un simple accident) is a 2025 political thriller film written and directed by Jafar Panahi. The film is a co-production between Iran, France, and Luxembourg. The film follows a group of former Iranian political prisoners who face the question of whether to exact revenge on a man they believe may be their tormentor. Panahi, who is critical of the Iranian government and has been imprisoned several times, made the film without official filming permission from the Iranian authorities.

The film had its world premiere at the main competition of the 78th Cannes Film Festival on 20 May 2025, where it won the Palme d'Or, and received critical acclaim. At the 83rd Golden Globe Awards, it became the first Iranian film to be nominated for Best Motion Picture – Drama, Best Director and Best Screenplay, and was also nominated for Best Foreign Language Film. At the 98th Academy Awards, it was nominated for Best International Feature Film (France) and Best Original Screenplay.

It Was Just an Accident was theatrically released in France on 1 October 2025 by Memento Distribution.

== Plot ==
A man with a prosthetic leg is driving his car at night with his wife and daughter when he accidentally hits and kills a dog. To repair his car, he visits a nearby garage where Vahid, an ethnic Azerbaijani auto mechanic, recognizes him from the squeaking sound his prosthetic leg makes. The next day Vahid follows the man, kidnaps him, and attempts to bury him in the desert. He tells him that he recognized his voice and stumbling walk as that of Eghbal (nicknamed "peg leg"), his former tormentor in an Iranian prison. The man denies being Eghbal and begs Vahid not to kill him, saying that the scars on his leg are recent, unlike Eghbal's.

Doubting the man's identity, Vahid puts his unconscious body into the van and visits Salar at a bookshop. Salar refuses to help him identify the man but directs him to a woman named Shiva, a photographer in the middle of taking wedding photos of Goli and Ali, an engaged couple to be married the next day. Reluctant to help him, Shiva recognizes the smell of the man as that of Eghbal but is also unsure of his identity due to the fact that they were blindfolded during their torture/interrogations. Goli reveals that she was also tortured by Eghbal but cannot confirm his identity either, so they seek out the help of Hamid, Shiva's former partner, drugging their captive first and plugging his ears.

Hamid instantly identifies the man as Eghbal after touching his legs and insists on killing him right away, but Vahid and Shiva hold him back, as they wish to hear him testify first. In the midst of deliberation and debate, they wind up in the desert. A cellphone rings from the man's body. Vahid picks it up and hears the man's daughter, who claims that her pregnant mother has fainted. The group visit the man's house and drive his daughter with her mother to a hospital, where the mother gives birth to a son.

Hamid, Goli, and Ali grow frustrated and decide to leave Vahid and Shiva behind. The two then drive the man to a secluded location at night, tie him up to a tree, wake him up, and demand that he testify. The man first claims mistaken identity again, but then caves and acknowledges that he is Eghbal, asserting that his actions were justified for the good of the Iranian regime and that killing him would only make him a martyr. Vahid and Shiva recount the torment they experienced in detail to Eghbal, and tell him that his wife has given birth to a son. Shiva forcefully demands that Eghbal apologize and after some back-and-forth he tearfully says that he is sorry, claiming that he was only trying to make a living. Vahid then sets Eghbal free and drives away with Shiva.

Later, Vahid and his mother prepare the van for his sister. A white car, similar to Eghbal's car, is seen entering the area while Vahid enters the house to retrieve something. He suddenly stops in his tracks. A squeaky sound resembling Eghbal's prosthetic leg is heard, first slowly approaching, then slowly moving away.

== Cast ==
- Vahid Mobasseri as Vahid
- Mariam Afshari as Shiva
- Ebrahim Azizi as Eghbal
- Hadis Pakbaten as Goli/Golrokh
- Majid Panahi as Ali
- Mohamad Ali Elyasmehr as Hamid
- Delnaz Najafi as Eghbal's daughter
- Afssaneh Najmabadi as Eghbal's wife
- Georges Hashemzadeh as Salar

== Production ==
=== Background ===
Panahi is one of Iran's best known directors, who has repeatedly criticized the policies of the Iranian regime in his works. He was arrested in 2022 after being sentenced in 2010 to a six-year prison sentence and a 20-year ban on working. He had not yet begun serving his prison sentence at that time. This decision was heavily criticized internationally. After almost seven months in detention, Panahi was released in early February 2023, after the 65-year-old went on a hunger strike. Despite his ban on working, he had always managed to complete film projects in Iran and have them released abroad. Most recently, in his absence, his film No Bears (2022) was shown in the main competition at the 79th Venice International Film Festival and won the Special Jury Prize there. In an interview ahead of the film's Cannes premiere, Panahi said that although the bans had been lifted on his filmmaking and travelling, he still had to maintain a secrecy about his work and had to work illegally with a "very limited cast and crew".

=== Financing and filming ===
It Was Just an Accident is a co-production between Iran, France and Luxembourg. It was produced by Panahi himself in collaboration with Philippe Martin for Les Films Pelléas, a Paris-based company that also produced Justine Triet's Palme d'Or-winning Anatomy of a Fall. The film was co-produced by Bidibul Productions (Luxembourg) and Pio & Co (France). Post-production was completed in France.

Panahi filmed It Was Just an Accident in secret, without a filming permit from the Islamic Republic. The actresses in the film do not always wear the hijab, which is compulsory for women under the law in Iran.

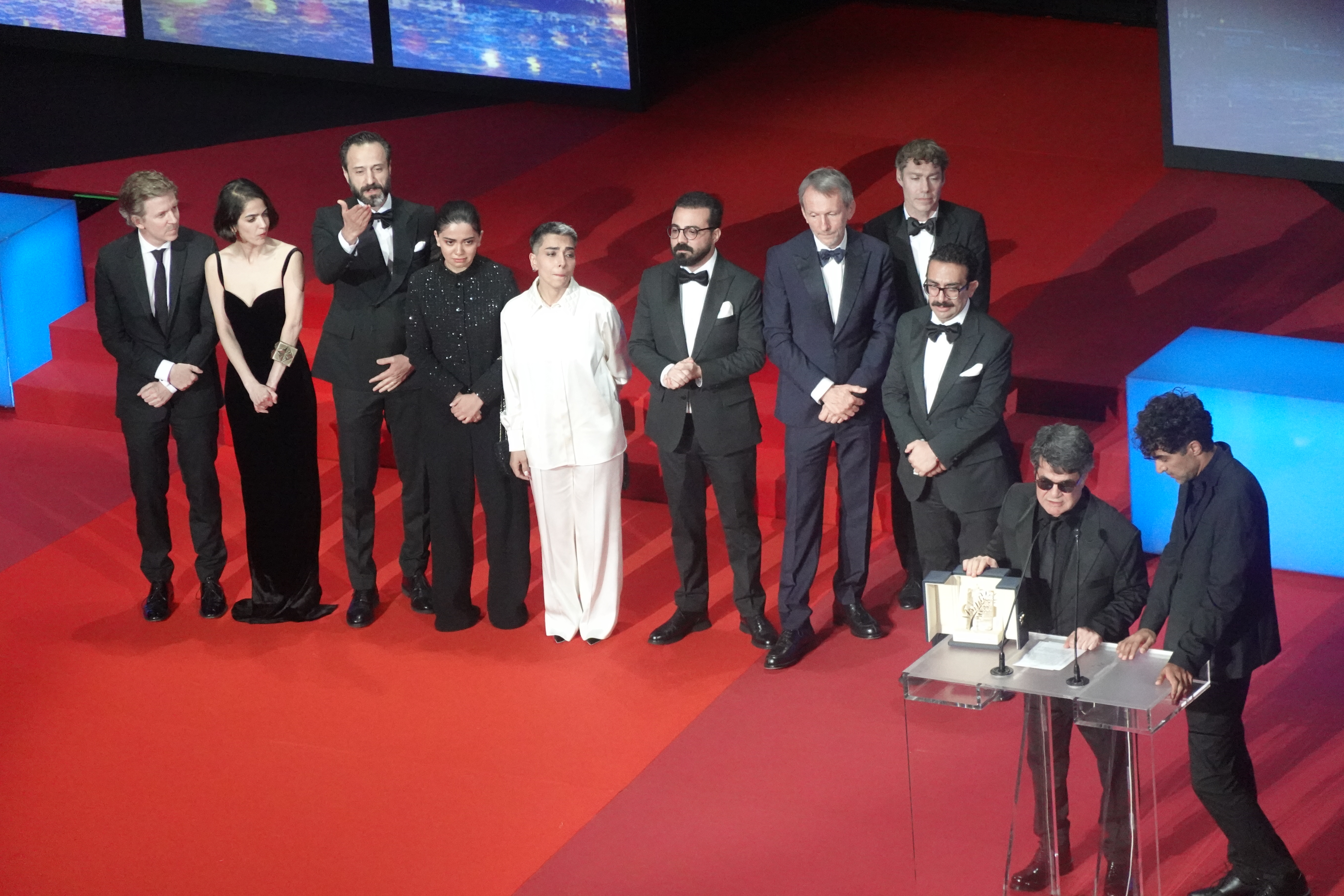
Cast and crew during Cannes awards ceremony

== Release ==
It Was Just an Accident was selected to compete for the Palme d'Or at the 78th Cannes Film Festival, where it had its world premiere on 20 May 2025. The film was described as a "tightly guarded mystery" upon its announcement at Cannes. Thierry Frémaux, the festival's general delegate, explained in early April that he wanted nothing to be leaked. Panahi's work last appeared at Cannes in 2021 with the omnibus documentary film The Year of the Everlasting Storm, presented as a Special Screening. Upon its announcement, Variety reported that it would be unlikely that Panahi would travel to Cannes for the premiere. Panahi, however, appeared in person at Cannes alongside his wife and daughter, as well as several of the cast members. He last appeared at Cannes in person in 2003, when Crimson Gold was screened in the Un Certain Regard section.

International sales are handled by MK2 Films. The film was theatrically released in France by Memento Distribution on 1 October 2025, under the title Un simple accident. Shortly after its Cannes premiere, Mubi acquired distribution rights to the film in Latin America, the U.K., Ireland, Germany, Austria, Turkey and India, with Neon buying rights for North America. It was released in the United States on 15 October 2025.

The film had its Canadian premiere in the Special Presentations section of the 2025 Toronto International Film Festival on 9 September 2025.

It was presented in the Gala Presentation at the 30th Busan International Film Festival on 18 September 2025, and also selected to screen at the Adelaide Film Festival on 19 October 2025, and the 20th Rome Film Festival in October 2025. The film also screened at the BFI London Film Festival and the New York Film Festival in October 2025.

The film was released on Blu-Ray by The Criterion Collection on June 30, 2026.

== Reception ==
=== Critical response ===
On the review aggregator website Rotten Tomatoes, 98% of 221 critics' reviews are positive, with an average rating of 8.7/10. The website's consensus reads: "Perhaps the most bluntly political film by Jafar Panahi yet, It Was Just an Accident is a defiant rebuke of authoritarianism that still delivers the entertainment value of a gripping thriller." Metacritic, which uses a weighted average, assigned the film a score of 91 out of 100, based on 41 critics, indicating "universal acclaim".

Davide Abbatescianni of Cineuropa described it as "a gripping, slow-burning narrative that culminates in an unexpectedly devastating finale," which is "both timely and timeless, and deeply rooted in the social and political realities of Iran."

In June 2025, IndieWire ranked the film at number 43 on its list of "The 100 Best Movies of the 2020s (So Far)."

=== Legal ===
Following the film's success in Cannes, French foreign minister Jean-Noël Barrot called Panahi's win "a gesture of resistance against the Iranian regime's oppression". A spokesperson for Iran's foreign ministry called Barrot's comments "insulting remarks and unfounded allegations" and criticised "the misuse by the French government" of the Cannes festival "to advance its political agenda against the Islamic Republic". France's chargé d'affaires in Tehran was summoned to the ministry in response. During the meeting, the Iranian representative condemned Barrot's comments as "blatant interference" and described the congratulatory message as "irresponsible and provocative", adding that France had "no moral authority at all" to comment on Iran, citing what he characterised as a failure by France to support Palestinians in Gaza. He demanded an official explanation from the French government, to which the envoy replied that he would convey the message to Paris.

More than 150 Iranian artists and activists, including the former Iranian crown prince in exile Reza Pahlavi and Nobel Peace Prize recipient Narges Mohammadi, were signatories to a public statement applauding Panahi as "an outstanding and courageous Iranian filmmaker" and congratulating his Palme d'Or win as a sign that "committed art and the voice of truth, even amidst the walls of censorship and pressure, can make the world admire these achievements. These achievements are an honor for all Iranians who fight for freedom, justice, and human dignity". Mohammad Rasoulof called the win a "powerful blow to the machinery of repression in the Islamic Republic".

=== Accolades ===
The film won the Palme d'Or at Cannes. In his award acceptance speech Panahi called for Iranians to unite against the Iranian regime. At the 83rd Golden Globe Awards, it became the first Iranian film to be nominated for Best Motion Picture – Drama, Best Director and Best Screenplay, and was also nominated for Best Foreign Language Film.

At the 2025 Gotham Awards, it was most awarded film, winning Best Director, Best Original Screenplay and Best International Feature.

Award	Date of ceremony	Category	Recipient(s)	Result	Ref.
Cannes Film Festival	24 May 2025	Palme d'Or	Jafar Panahi	Won	
Cannes Film Festival	24 May 2025	Prix de la Citoyenneté	Jafar Panahi	Won	
Sydney Film Festival	15 June 2025	Sydney Film Prize	Jafar Panahi	Won	
Mill Valley Film Festival	14 October 2025	MVFF Award, Filmmaking	Jafar Panahi	Won	
Mill Valley Film Festival	14 October 2025	Audience Favorite – Independent Cinema	It Was Just an Accident	Won	
Middleburg Film Festival	19 October 2025	Impact Award	Jafar Panahi	Won	
Montclair Film Festival	27 October 2025	Audience Award for World Cinema	It Was Just an Accident	Won	
Asia Pacific Screen Awards	27 November 2025	Best Film	It Was Just an Accident	Won	
Asia Pacific Screen Awards	27 November 2025	Best Director	Jafar Panahi	Won	
British Independent Film Awards	30 November 2025	Best International Independent Film	Jafar Panahi, Phillippe Martin	Nominated	
Gotham Independent Film Awards	1 December 2025	Best Director	Jafar Panahi	Won	
Gotham Independent Film Awards	1 December 2025	Best Original Screenplay	Jafar Panahi	Won	
Gotham Independent Film Awards	1 December 2025	Best International Feature	Philippe Martin and Jafar Panahi	Won	
Atlanta Film Critics Circle	3 December 2025	Best International Feature	It Was Just an Accident	Won	
Atlanta Film Critics Circle	3 December 2025	Top 10 Films	It Was Just an Accident	6th Place	
American Film Institute Awards	3 December 2025	AFI Special Award	It Was Just an Accident	Won	
Washington DC Area Film Critics Association	7 December 2025	Best Director	Jafar Panahi	Nominated	
Washington DC Area Film Critics Association	7 December 2025	Best Acting Ensemble	It Was Just an Accident	Nominated	
Washington DC Area Film Critics Association	7 December 2025	Best Original Screenplay	It Was Just an Accident	Nominated	
Washington DC Area Film Critics Association	7 December 2025	Best Foreign Language Film	It Was Just an Accident	Nominated	
Los Angeles Film Critics Association	7 December 2025	Best Screenplay	Jafar Panahi	Won	
Los Angeles Film Critics Association	7 December 2025	Best Film Not In The English Language	It Was Just an Accident	Runner-up	
Toronto Film Critics Association Awards	7 December 2025	Best International Feature	It Was Just an Accident	Runner-up	
Chicago Film Critics Association	11 December 2025	Best Director	Jafar Panahi	Nominated	
Chicago Film Critics Association	11 December 2025	Best Film	It Was Just an Accident	Nominated	
Chicago Film Critics Association	11 December 2025	Best Original Screenplay	It Was Just an Accident	Won	
Chicago Film Critics Association	11 December 2025	Best Foreign Language Film	It Was Just an Accident	Won	
St. Louis Film Critics Association	14 December 2025	Best Film	It Was Just an Accident	Nominated	
St. Louis Film Critics Association	14 December 2025	Best International Feature Film	It Was Just an Accident	Won	
St. Louis Film Critics Association	14 December 2025	Best Director	Jafar Panahi	Nominated	
St. Louis Film Critics Association	14 December 2025	Best Original Screenplay	Jafar Panahi	Nominated	
St. Louis Film Critics Association	14 December 2025	Best Scene	It Was Just an Accident - Finale	Nominated	
San Diego Film Critics Society Awards	15 December 2025	Best Picture	It Was Just an Accident	Nominated	
San Diego Film Critics Society Awards	15 December 2025	Best Foreign Language Film	It Was Just an Accident	Won	
San Diego Film Critics Society Awards	15 December 2025	Best Director	Jafar Panahi	Nominated	
San Diego Film Critics Society Awards	15 December 2025	Best Original Screenplay	Jafar Panahi	Won	
Seattle Film Critics Society	15 December 2025	Best Picture	It Was Just an Accident	Nominated	
Seattle Film Critics Society	15 December 2025	Best International Feature	It Was Just an Accident	Won	
Critics' Choice Awards	4 January 2026	Best Foreign Language Film	It Was Just an Accident	Nominated	
New York Film Critics Circle	6 January 2026	Best Director	Jafar Panahi	Won	
Astra Film Awards	9 January 2026	Best Picture – Drama	It Was Just an Accident	Nominated	
Astra Film Awards	9 January 2026	Best International Feature	It Was Just an Accident	Nominated	
AARP Movies for Grownups Awards	10 January 2026	Best Foreign Language Film	It Was Just an Accident	Nominated	
Golden Globe Awards	11 January 2026	Best Motion Picture – Drama	It Was Just an Accident	Nominated	
Golden Globe Awards	11 January 2026	Best Foreign Language Film	It Was Just an Accident	Nominated	
Golden Globe Awards	11 January 2026	Best Director	Jafar Panahi	Nominated	
Golden Globe Awards	11 January 2026	Best Screenplay	Jafar Panahi	Nominated	
National Board of Review	13 January 2026	Best International Film	It Was Just an Accident	Won	
European Film Awards	17 January 2026	European Film	Philippe Martin, Jafar Panahi, Christel Hénon, Sandrine Dumas	Nominated	
European Film Awards	17 January 2026	European Director	Jafar Panahi	Nominated	
European Film Awards	17 January 2026	European Screenwriter	Jafar Panahi	Nominated	
European Film Awards	14 April 2026	LUX Audience Award	It Was Just an Accident	Nominated	
Lumière Awards	18 January 2026	Best International Co-Production	It Was Just an Accident	Nominated	
Goya Awards	28 February 2026	Best European Film	It Was Just an Accident	Nominated	
Cinema for Peace Awards	16 February 2026	Cinema for Peace Dove for The Most Valuable Film of the Year	It Was Just an Accident	Nominated	
Academy Awards	March 15, 2026	Best International Feature Film	France	Nominated	
Academy Awards	March 15, 2026	Best Original Screenplay	Jafar Panahi; in collaboration with Nader Saïvar, Shadmehr Rastin, and Mehdi Mahmoudian	Nominated	
David di Donatello	May 6, 2026	Best International Film	It Was Just an Accident	Nominated	

== See also ==
- List of submissions to the 98th Academy Awards for Best International Feature Film
- List of French submissions for the Academy Award for Best International Feature Film
