= Panah Panahi =

Iranian film director (born 1984)

Panah Panahi (Persian: پناه پناهی; born 1984) is an Iranian film director. His debut film, Hit the Road, premiered in the Directors' Fortnight section of the 2021 Cannes Film Festival, and was named Best Film at the 2021 BFI London Film Festival.

== Personal life ==
Panahi was born in Tehran, Iran, to Jafar Panahi, a film director associated with the Iranian New Wave movement, and Tahereh Saidi, a nurse. He has a younger sister, Solnaz. Panahi studied at the University of Tehran. As of 2022, he continues to reside in Tehran.

== Career ==
Growing up, Panahi worked as an assistant on several times directed by his father, and also observed his father's collaborators, including Abbas Kiarostami. In 2009, while still a student at the University of Tehran, Panahi's short film The First Film was screened at the Montreal World Film Festival in Montreal, Canada.

Panahi edited his father's film 3 Faces, which competed for the Palme d'Or at the 2018 Cannes Film Festival.

Panahi's directorial debut, Hit the Road, was filmed in 2019 and follows a family travelling to a border in north-western Iran in order to smuggle their eldest son out of the country. Panahi stated his emotional inspiration for the film was the last day he spent with his sister Solnaz before she left Iran due to threats being made against her. Panahi provided a false script to Iranian authorities in order to make the film within the country. Hit the Road premiered during Director's Fortnight at the 2021 Cannes Film Festival and subsequently was screened at other European film festivals including the Karlovy Vary International Film Festival in the Czech Republic and the BFI London Film Festival in the United Kingdom. At the latter, it was given the Best Film award, with competition president Małgorzata Szumowska describing it as "a film that made us laugh and cry and feel alive".
