= Jafar Panahi =

Iranian filmmaker and actor (born 1960)

- جعفر پناهی
- Panahi at the 2025 Cannes Film Festival
- Pronunciation: [d͡ʒæʔfæɹe pʰænɒ́ːhíː]
- Born: 11 July 1960 (age 66); Mianeh, East Azerbaijan, Iran
- Education: Iran Broadcasting University
- Occupations: Film director; screenwriter; cinematographer; producer; editor
- Years active: 1988–present
- Known for: The White Balloon; The Circle; This Is Not a Film; Taxi; It Was Just an Accident
- Style: Neorealism
- Spouse: Tahere Saeedi (m. 1983)
- Children: 2, including Panah
- Awards: Golden Leopard (1997); Golden Lion (2000); Sakharov Prize (2012); Golden Bear (2015); Palme d'Or (2025)
- Military career
- Allegiance: Iran
- Branch: Army
- Service years: 1980–1982
- Conflicts: Kurdish rebellion (POW); Iran–Iraq War

Jafar Panahi (Note: Persian pronunciation: [d͡ʒæʔfæɹe pʰænɒ́ːhíː].) (Persian: جعفر پناهی, pronounced [d͡ʒæʔfæɹe pʰænɒ́ːhíː]; born 11 July 1960) is an Iranian filmmaker and actor. He is known internationally for his artistic contributions to post-1979 Revolution Iranian cinema, and he has been associated with the Iranian New Wave. His work, rooted in neorealism and centered on the lives of women, children, and the marginalized, constitutes a critical portrait of the social, political, and gendered structures of contemporary Iran.

Panahi began his career making short films and working as an assistant to Abbas Kiarostami. His debut feature, The White Balloon (1995), won the Caméra d'Or at the 1995 Cannes Film Festival, marking the first major award for an Iranian film at that event. Panahi is one of only four directors in history—alongside Henri-Georges Clouzot, Michelangelo Antonioni, and Robert Altman—to win the top prizes at Europe's three major film festivals: the Palme d'Or at Cannes, the Golden Bear at Berlin, and the Golden Lion at Venice, awarded respectively for It Was Just an Accident (2025), Taxi (2015), and The Circle (2000). Among numerous accolades, he is the recipient of the Telluride Film Festival Silver Medallion and nominations for two Golden Globe Awards and an Academy Award.

Panahi's career has been marked by conflict with Iranian authorities. Starting with his third feature film, The Circle, which addresses the situation of women in Iran, his films have frequently been banned or censored in the country. In 2010, he was sentenced to six years in prison and a 20-year ban on filmmaking activities, based on charges of "propaganda against the Islamic Republic". Even under legal restrictions, Panahi continued to make films without permission, many of them produced semi-clandestinely. This Is Not a Film (2011), Closed Curtain (2013), Taxi (2015), and No Bears (2022) are works that often reflect, in a metacinematic way, on his own limitations as an artist under state surveillance. His legal confrontations are ongoing, with new sentences, such as a one-year prison sentence on charges of engaging in propaganda activities against the Iranian state.

In addition to his filmmaking, Panahi was awarded the Sakharov Prize for Freedom of Thought by the European Parliament in 2012, in recognition of his defense of freedom of expression. He won Time 100 for 2026.

== Early life and education ==
Jafar Panahi was born in Mianeh, Iran, to an Iranian Azerbaijani family, which he has described as working-class. He grew up with four sisters and two brothers. His father worked as a house painter. His family spoke Azerbaijani at home, but Persian with other Iranians. When he was ten years old he used an 8 mm film camera. He also acted in one film and assisted Kanoon's library director in running a program that taught children how to operate a film camera.

Starting at age 12, Panahi worked after school in order to afford to go and see films. His impoverished childhood helped form the humanistic worldview of his films.

At age 20, Panahi was conscripted into the Iranian Army and served in the Iran–Iraq War, working as an army cinematographer from 1980 to 1982. In 1981, he was captured by Kurdish rebels and held for 76 days.

From his war experiences, he made a documentary that was eventually shown on TV. After completing his military service, Panahi enrolled at the College of Cinema and TV in Tehran, where he studied filmmaking and especially appreciated the works of Alfred Hitchcock, Howard Hawks, Luis Buñuel, and Jean-Luc Godard. There he first met and befriended filmmaker Parviz Shahbazi and cinematographer Farzad Jodat, who shot all of Panahi's early work. During college he interned at the Bandar Abbas Center on the Persian Gulf Coast, where he made his first short documentary films. He also began working as an assistant director on his professor's films before graduating in 1988.

== Early career ==
Panahi made several short documentary films for Iranian television through the Islamic Republic of Iran Broadcasting's Channel 2. His first short film, The Wounded Heads (Yarali Bashlar), was a documentary about the illegal mourning tradition of head slashing in the Azerbaijan region of northern Iran. The film documents a mourning ceremony for the third Shi'ite Imam, Imam Hossein, in which people hit their heads with knives until they bled. Panahi had to shoot in secret and the film was banned for several years. In 1988 Panahi filmed The Second Look (Negah-e Dovvom), a behind-the-scenes documentary short on the making of Kambuzia Partovi's film Golnar. It focuses on the puppet maker for Partovi's film and his relationship with his puppets. It was not released until 1993. In 1990 he worked as an assistant director on Partovi's film The Fish (1991).

In 1992, Panahi made his first narrative short film, The Friend (Doust), an homage to Kiarostami's first short film, The Bread and Alley. That same year Panahi made his second narrative short, The Final Exam (Akharin Emtehan). Both films starred non-professional actors Ali Azizollahi and Mehdi Shahabi and won awards for Best Film, Best Screenplay, Best Cinematography, and Best Editing at Iran's National TV Festival that year. Inspired by a story of a young Luis Buñuel once contacting successful film director Jean Epstein to ask for a job in filmmaking, Panahi left a message on Kiarostami's answering machine saying that he loved his films and asking for a job on his next film. Kiarostami hired Panahi as his assistant director for the film Through the Olive Trees.

== Career as a filmmaker ==
=== The White Balloon (1995) ===
In 1995, Panahi made his feature film debut, The White Balloon (بادکنک سفید), produced by IRIB-Channel 2, Ferdos Films and the Farabi Cinema Foundation. Initially titled Happy New Year, Panahi developed the original story with Parviz Shahbazi and attempted to get funding from IRIB's Channel 1 with the expectation that it would be a short film, but his proposal was rejected. He then showed his original treatment for the film to Kiarostami during the shooting of Through the Olive Trees. Kiarostami encouraged Panahi to make the idea into a feature and agreed to write the script. During their car rides to set while shooting, Kiarostami would dictate the film's script while Panahi taped the conversation and typed the script. Kiarostami also helped Panahi secure funding from IRIB's Channel 2. While casting the film, Panahi traveled throughout Iran in order to include all of the diverse ethnicities of his country as characters in the film. He found lead actress Aida Mohammadkhani at the first school that he visited and immediately cast her as Razieh, but auditioned 2,600 young boys for the role of Razieh's brother Ali before settling on Mohsen Kafili. He cast non-professionals in most of the supporting roles, including a real fish seller he found in the Rasht market and a college student to portray the young soldier. He also cast professional actress Anna Borkowska as an Armenian woman.

In the film, Razieh, a strong-willed little girl in Tehran, wants to buy a lucky goldfish for the upcoming Iranian New Year celebration, but struggles to get and hold on to the 500-toman banknote needed to purchase the fish. Panahi worked closely with Mohammadkhani, gaining her trust and acting out each scene for her to mimic while still adding her own personality to the performance. Panahi was most concerned about Mohammadkhani being able to cry on cue, so he would have her stare at him off camera while he started to cry, causing her to cry. Filming began in early April 1994 in Kashan, Iran and continued until early June. Panahi has stated that during the making of his feature debut he "wanted to prove to myself that I can do the job, that I can finish a feature film successfully and get good acting out of my players." He also stated that "In a world where films are made with millions of dollars, we made a film about a little girl who wants to buy a fish for less than a dollar – this is what we're trying to show." In Iran, films depicting children are the most likely to avoid censorship or political controversy, and The White Balloon was screened exclusively in theatres that specialized in children's films. Because of this the film had low attendance on its initial run in Iranian theatres, with only 130,000 tickets sold.

It went on to win four prizes in Iran at the Isfahan Film Festival for Children and Young Adults and at the Fajr International Film Festival. For several years after its release, Kanoon's Channel 2 would broadcast the film every year on New Year's Day. Outside of Iran The White Balloon received excellent reviews and was shown at the 1995 Cannes Film Festival, where it won the Camera d'Or. It also won the Golden Award of the Governor of Tokyo for Best Film and the Bronze Dragon for Best Film of Young Cinema at the 1995 Tokyo International Film Festival, the International Jury Award at the 1995 São Paulo International Film Festival and the Best Film Award at the 1996 Cinéfest Sudbury International Film Festival. It was Iran's official submission for Best Foreign Language Film at the 68th Academy Awards; however, the Iranian government asked the academy to withdraw the film after Iran's relations with the US began to deteriorate. The academy refused to withdraw the film, which was not nominated, and Panahi was forbidden by the Iranian government to travel to the Sundance Film Festival or to participate in phone interviews with US reporters to promote the film.

=== The Mirror (1997) ===
Panahi's second feature film was The Mirror (آینه), produced by Rooz Films. Initially Panahi was going to direct Kiarostami's script for Willow and Wind, but he decided to pursue his own work instead. Panahi was inspired to make the film when while attending the 1996 Pusan International Film Festival in South Korea he noticed a young girl sitting alone on a park bench staring blankly into space, and realized that he had seen this same thing countless times in Iran and never paid attention to it. He has stated that he "choose a precocious child and placed her in a situation where she is left to her own devices. Everyone she meets on her journey is wearing a mask or playing a role. I wanted to throw these masks away." The film stars Mina Mohammadkhani, the sister of Aida Mohammadkhani. In the film Mohammadkhani could be said to play two characters: the role of a little girl named Baharan and then herself as the film shifts into a documentary mode. Panahi reported casting her after having detected " a feeling of emptiness within her, and a determination to prove herself to the world." It received the Golden Leopard Award at the Locarno Film Festival, the Special Jury Award and Best Director Award at the 1998 Singapore International Film Festival, the Golden Tulip Award at the 1998 Istanbul Film Festival, the FIPRESCI Prize and the Eisenstein Magical Crystal and Cash Award at the 1998 Riga International Film Festival, and Buñuel's Golden Era Award at the Royal Archive Film Festival in Belgium.

=== The Circle (2000) ===
In 2000, Panahi made The Circle (دایره ), produced by Jafar Panahi Film Productions and Mikado-Lumiere&Co. Although Panahi claimed that he was not a political filmmaker, his third feature was a major departure from his first two works about children and is critical of the treatment of women under Iran's Islamist regime. Panahi has stated that "I started my career making children's films, and while doing that I had no problems with censors. As soon as I started making feature films, it all started and I had problems," but that "in my first films, I worked with children and young people, but I began to think of the limitations facing these girls once they grow up. In order to visualize these limitations and to have this constraint better projected visually, I went to a social class, which has more limitations to areas that are more underprivileged, so that this idea could come out ever stronger." He had to wait an entire year to get an official shooting permit.

The film was shot in 35 days over a 53-day period. As usual, Panahi used non-professional actors, with the exceptions of Fatemeh Naghavi and Fereshteh Sadre Orafaiy. He saw the lead actress, Nargess Mamizadeh, in a park one day and immediately offered her the role. The film opens with one long, handheld shot that lasts over three minutes and took 13 attempts to achieve. Panahi adopted a different camera style to depict each of the four main protagonists' lives. For the first, an idealistic woman he used a handheld camera. For the second woman, the camera is mounted on a constantly moving dolly. The third woman's story is told at night in darker outside, and the camera is static with pans and tight close-ups. For the last, least optimistic woman both the camera and the woman are completely immobile and very little sound is used. Panahi submitted the film to the Venice Film Festival without getting a permit from the Ministry of Culture and Islamic Guidance. At the festival it won the Golden Lion, the FIPRESCI prize, the UNICEF prize, the Ecumenical Special Mention, the Sergio Trazzati Award and Mamizadeh won the Italian Film Journalist's Award for Best Actress. The Ministry of Culture and Guidance issued a permit for the film a few days before its screening at the festival, although they already knew that it had been submitted illegally. The Ministry later banned the film in Iran. Panahi was worried that the Ministry would "confiscate and mutilate" all copies of the film, so he made multiple copies and hid them all over Iran. Irans's Cinema Deputy Mohammad-Hassan Pezeshk said that The Circle was banned because it had "such a completely dark and humiliating perspective." It was later withdrawn by Iranian authorities from the Fajr International Film Festival for being "offensive to Muslim women".

The film went on to win the FIPRESCI Film of the Year Award at the San Sebastián International Film Festival, appeared on Top 10 lists of critics worldwide and won the Best Film Award at the Montevideo International Film Festival and the Freedom of Expression Award from the National Board of Review.

=== Crimson Gold (2003) ===
When people like me do these things, we know what position we are in. We are recognized around the world and so [the authorities] cannot pressure us too much. If something happens to us, it will be reported everywhere and even here [in Iran]. We have to risk pushing the limits for those kids who are just starting off. Those who are making their first films are forced to do whatever they are told; they allow the censors to mutilate their films. If we do not stand up to the censors the conditions will be worse for the young filmmakers. This would mean that this cinema would not continue; it would be suppressed and end with the few people who make films now. A cinema can survive if it has new filmmakers and makes new films. If we don't resist, the path will be blocked for the new filmmaker and therefore in the eyes of the next generation we will be responsible. There is no other way.

— Jafar Panahi

Panahi directed Crimson Gold (طلای سرخ) in 2003, produced by Jafar Panahi Productions. The film depicts an impoverished pizza delivery man's failed attempt to rob a jewelry store and the events that drove him to his crime. The story is based on real events that Panahi first heard about when Kiarostami told him the story while they were stuck in a traffic jam on their way to one of Kiarostami's photographic exhibits. Panahi was extremely moved by the story and Kiarostami agreed to write the script for him to direct. Panahi submitted the film to the Cannes Film Festival without being granted a permit from the Ministry of Culture and Islamic Guidance. Panahi had applied for the permit but the Ministry demanded several cuts be made to the film. Panahi refused and submitted the film anyway. At the festival it won the Un Certain Regard Jury Award. It later won the Golden Hugo Award for Best Film at the Chicago International Film Festival. Like The Circle, Crimson Gold was banned in Iran.

=== Offside (2006) ===
In 2006, Panahi made Offside (آفساید). In the film, a group of young Iranian girls disguise themselves as boys to sneak into Azadi Stadium to watch the World Cup qualifying football playoff game between Iran and Bahrain. The film was partially shot during the actual game it depicts. Since the 1979 Islamic Revolution women have been banned from attending football matches in Iran on grounds of rowdy and aggressive language, lewd behavior, and seeing men in shorts and short sleeve shirts. At one point Mahmoud Ahmadinejad had wanted to repeal the law but was overruled by the ulema. Panahi has stated "I use the football game as a metaphor to show the discrimination against women on a larger scale. All my movies have that topic at their center. This is what I am trying to change in Iranian society." The film was inspired by an incident several years earlier when Panahi's daughter was refused entry to a football stadium but ended up sneaking into the stadium anyway.

Knowing that the film would be controversial, Panahi and his crew submitted a fake script about some young men who go to a football match to Iranian authorities in order to get permission to make the film. However, before they began shooting the Ministry of Guidance, which issues licenses for films to be shown publicly, told Panahi in advance that because of his past films they would not issue Offside a license until he re-edited his previous films. Not wanting to miss the World Cup tournament, Panahi ignored the Ministry and began shooting the film. As usual, Panahi cast non-professional actors for the film, and the group of young girls in the lead roles were mostly university students that Panahi found through friends who all were passionate fans of football. The film was shot in 39 days and in order to move unnoticed through large crowds Panahi used digital video for the first time so as to have a smaller, more inconspicuous camera. Panahi also officially listed his assistant director as the Director of the film so as not to attract the attention of the Ministry of Guidance or the Disciplinary Forces of Tehran, but towards the end of the film's shooting a newspaper article about the making of the film listed Panahi as the director and both organizations attempted to shut the film down and confiscate the footage. Only a sequence that takes place on a bus remained to be filmed so Panahi was able to continue filming without being caught.

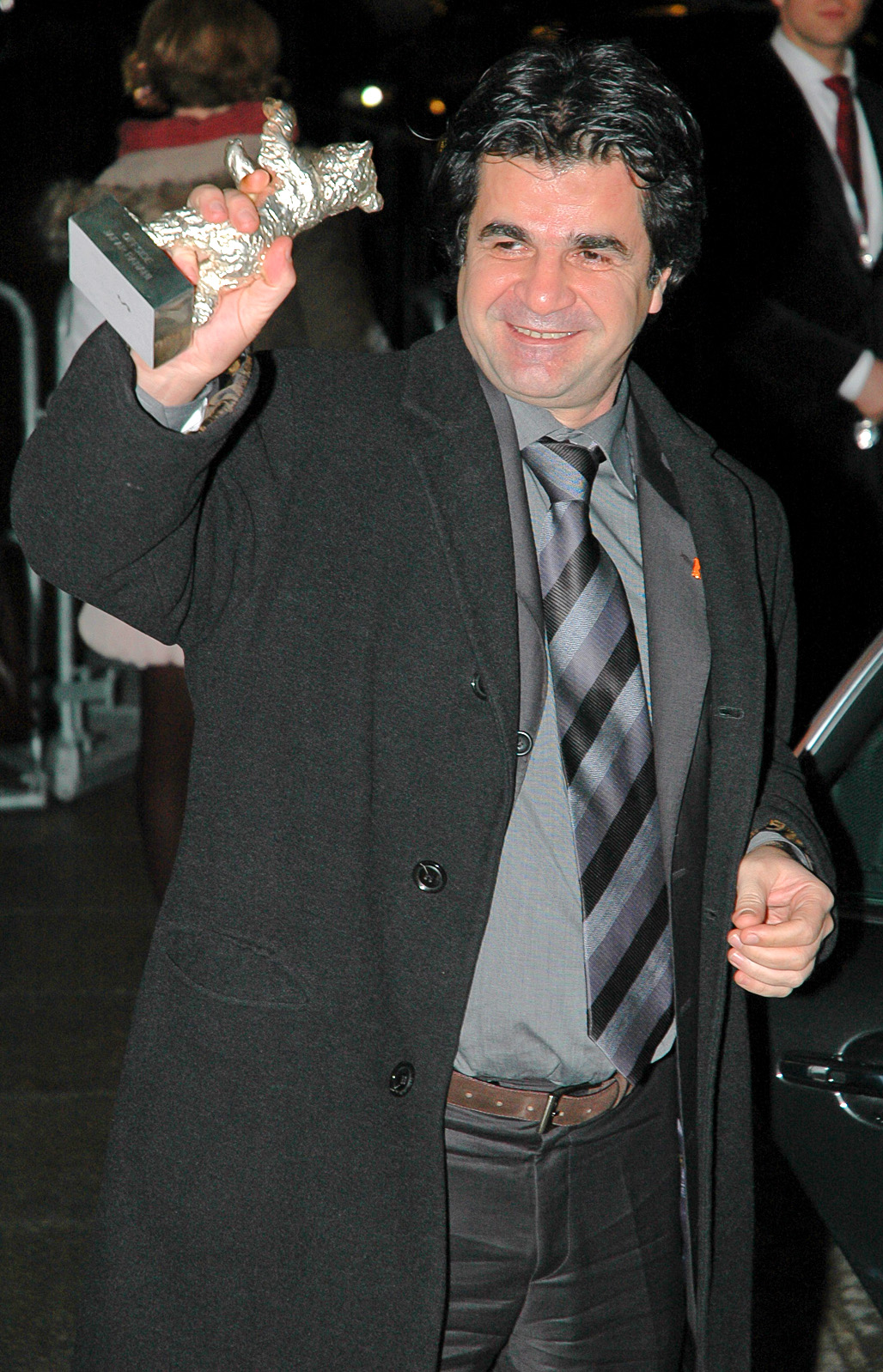
Panahi at the 2006 Berlin Film Festival

The film premiered in competition at the 2006 Berlin Film Festival, where Panahi was awarded with the Silver Bear Jury Grand Prix. Like The Circle and Crimson Gold before it, Offside was banned from being shown in Iran. Panahi had already set up distribution for the film all over Iran and the film was predicted to break all box office records. Two days after being banned and twenty days before the World Cup championship game, unlicensed DVD copies of the film became available all over Iran. Panahi has stated that of his films Offside is "probably the one that people have seen the most" in Iran. After the film's release a feminist protest group in Iran called the White Scarf Girls began showing up at football matches carrying banners that read: "We don't want to be Offside". Sony Pictures Classics, the film's U.S. distributor, wrote a letter to the Ministry of Guidance in Iran requesting that the film be shown for at least one week in its home country so that they could launch a campaign to nominate the film for Best Foreign Language Film, but the Ministry refused.

=== This Is Not a Film (2011) ===
Amid the controversy and his appeal against the six-year prison sentence and 20-year filmmaking ban imposed by the Islamic Revolutionary Court, Panahi defied the judicial order and, in 2011, made the documentary feature This Is Not a Film (این فیلم نیست) in collaboration with Iranian filmmaker Mojtaba Mirtahmasb. The film was made for €3,200 and shot on a digital camcorder and an iPhone. It was shot in four days over a ten-day period in March 2011 and its title was inspired by René Magritte's painting The Treachery of Images. In the film Panahi sits in his apartment making phone calls about his court case, watching TV news stories, interacting with his neighbors, talking about his past films and describing scenes from the film that he had begun shooting when he was arrested (much as he had described scenes from films to his sisters as a child). Ten days before the opening of the 2011 Cannes Film Festival, This Is Not a Film was announced as a surprise entry into the festival. It was smuggled out of Iran on a USB thumb drive; many references to the film repeat a story of the drive in turn being hidden in a cake, but Panahi has confirmed this is untrue ("I have no idea who invented the story of the cake and for what purpose."). Panahi's wife and daughter attended the festival. In December 2012 it was shortlisted as one of 15 films eligible for Best Documentary Feature at the 85th Academy Awards.

=== Closed Curtain (2013) ===
In October 2012, Kiarostami told a journalist that Panahi had completed a new film that he predicted would be screened in film festivals. In January 2013 the Berlin Film Festival announced that it would premiere Closed Curtain (پرده) at its 2013 edition. This film was co-directed by Panahi and Kambozia Partovi, who both appear in it along with cast members Maryam Moqadam and Hadi Saeedi. Berlin Film Festival director Dieter Kosslick is a longtime supporter of Panahi and said that he "asked the Iranian government, the president and the culture minister, to allow Jafar Panahi to attend the world premiere of his film at the Berlinale." In the film Partovi and Moqadam star as two people wanted by the police who hide out in a house on the Caspian Sea and always keep the curtains closed to avoid detection. The film was shown in competition at the 63rd Berlinale in February 2013. Panahi won the Silver Bear for Best Script.

=== Taxi (2015) ===
In January 2015, it was announced that Panahi's film Taxi (تاکسی) was scheduled to premiere in competition at the 65th Berlin International Film Festival. Panahi was awarded the Golden Bear for the film at the festival.

It has been described as "a portrait of the Iranian capital Tehran" and as a "documentary-like film is set in a Tehran taxi that is driven by Panahi."

=== Flower (unrealized) ===
In December 2014, Panahi won a $25,000 grant from the Motion Picture Association Academy Film Fund for the screenplay Flower (Gol). He was awarded the grant at the 8th annual Asia Pacific Screen Awards in Brisbane, Australia. The script, which focuses on disabled people in Iran, was intended to be directed by Panahi's son, Panah Panahi, with Jafar Panahi serving as executive producer. The project was described as exploring "the turmoil created by a father's conviction that he must kill his disabled son to bring peace to his family. This challenging drama is drawn from real life, and brings home the plight of people with disabilities in Iran." However, the film was never produced. Panahi made his directorial debut instead with the critically acclaimed road movie Hit the Road in 2021.

=== 3 Faces (2018) ===
Also filmed semi‑clandestinely in Iran, 3 Faces (سه رخ ) won the Best Screenplay award at the 2018 Cannes Film Festival and was widely praised by critics as a mature and politically engaged work, even within the limitations imposed on the director.

=== No Bears (2022) ===
In 2022, Panahi released a new film, No Bears (خرس نیست), in which a lightly fictionalised Panahi has moved to a small village immediately adjacent to the Turkish border while directing a movie remotely via laptop. Life begins to mirror art as Panahi becomes embroiled in a local scandal involving two young lovers kept apart by custom, superstition and the local moral authorities while his movie—concerning a couple who are trying to escape Iran using false passports—collapses after the two main actors involved are tangled in a web of lies as they too try to flee the repressive Iranian state for good.

The film won the Chicago International Film Festival Award for Cinematic Bravery and was nominated for Best Feature. It won Best Film at the Trieste Film Festival and the Oslo Films from the South Festival and won the Special Jury Prize at the 2022 Venice Film Festival.

=== It Was Just an Accident (2025) ===
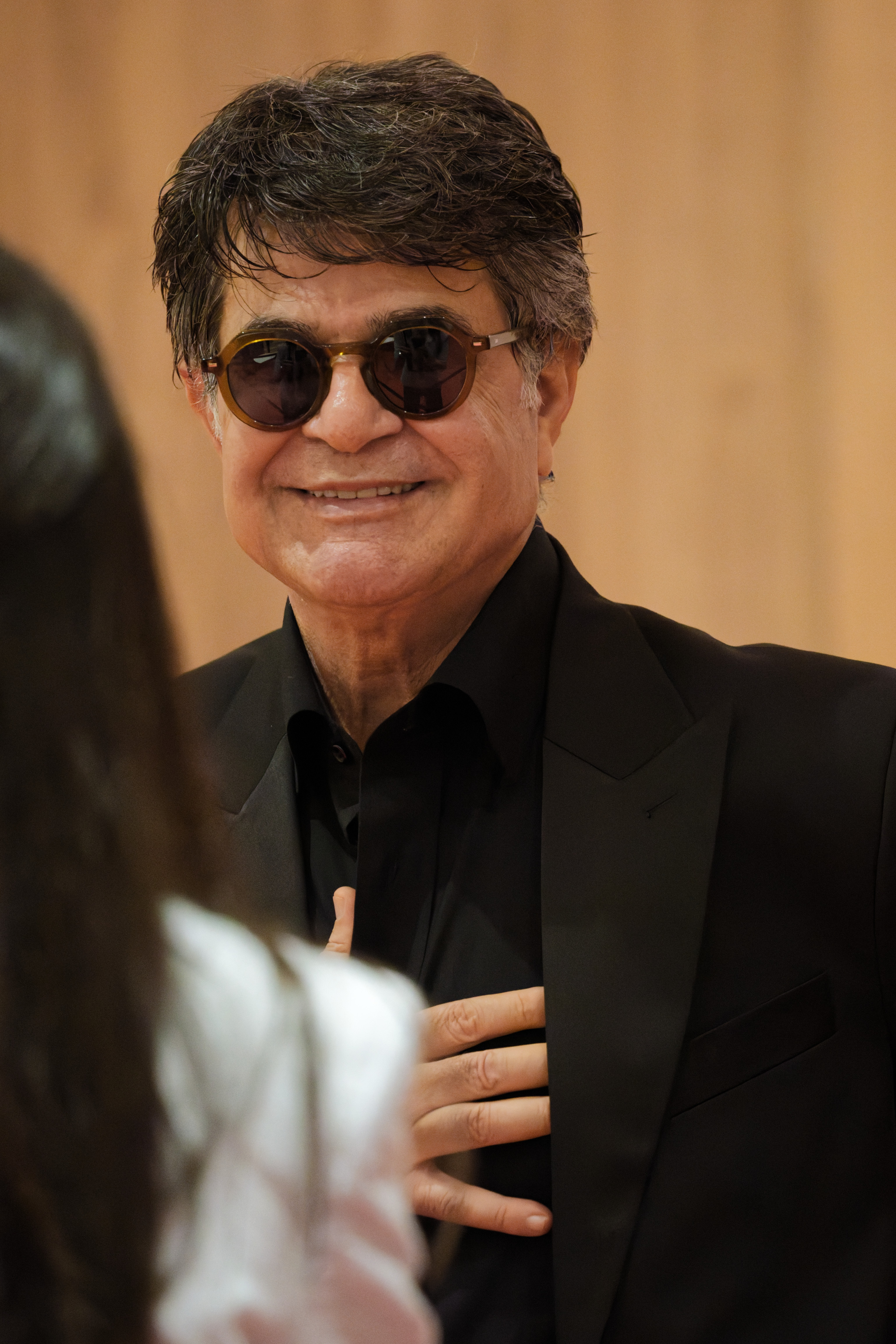
Panahi being interviewed at the 2025 Cannes Film Festival after receiving the Palme d'Or

In April 2025 it was announced that Panahi's latest film, It Was Just an Accident (یک تصادف ساده), would premiere in competition at the 2025 Cannes Film Festival on 20 May. Before the premiere the plot of the film was kept secret except for a logline: "What begins as a minor accident sets in motion a series of escalating consequences." The film was shot without a permit from the Iranian government and features women not wearing a hijab to speak out against the country's oppressive hijab law. This is his first film since being released from jail in Iran and his return to Cannes after a seven-year absence. It was produced by Les Films Pelléas, co-produced by Bidibul Productions and Pio &Co.

At its premiere, the film received an 8-minute standing ovation, where Panahi gave an emotional speech expressing his guilt for being able to travel freely while his fellow filmmakers are being imprisoned in Iran. In his speech he questioned: "...how I could be happy, how I could feel free, if they were still inside." He continued, "Today, I'm here with you, I receive this joy, but I feel the same emotion. How can I rejoice? How can I be free while in Iran, there are still so many of the greatest directors and actresses of Iranian cinema, who, because they participated in and supported the demonstrators during the Femme Liberté movement, are today prevented from working?"

The film later went on to win the Palme d'Or at the film festival's conclusion.

=== Other work ===
In 1997, Panahi made the documentary short film Ardekoul. In 2007 he contributed the short film Untying the Knot to the omnibus film Persian Carpet. The film contains one single long take and is inspired by his childhood. In 2010 he made the short film The Accordion, which was commissioned for the Then and Now Beyond Borders and Differences series of short film by Art for The World. It premiered at the 2010 Venice Film Festival. Panahi has referred to the situation in Iran as "the dark ages for filmmaking in Iran" and that he was "presenting the future with something to see, a document of what life was like at that time."

Panahi directed a segment of the anthology film The Year of the Everlasting Storm, which had its world premiere at the 2021 Cannes Film Festival. In 2024, he collaborated to The Witness, serving as screenwriter, editor and artistic consultant.

== Legal problems and controversies ==
=== Earlier legal problems ===
On 15 April 2001, Panahi stopped over at JFK International Airport in New York City en route from Hong Kong to Buenos Aires, where he was to participate in a film festival. He was immediately detained by police officers who wanted to fingerprint and photograph him; Panahi refused both requests on the grounds that he was not a criminal. He was threatened with jail and refused an interpreter or a phone call. After being handcuffed and detained at the airport until the next morning, he was finally allowed to make a phone call to his friend Professor Jamsheed Akrami. He was finally photographed and sent back to Hong Kong.

In 2003, Panahi was arrested and interrogated for four hours by the Information Ministry in Iran, then released after being encouraged to leave Iran.

On 30 July 2009, Mojtaba Saminejad, an Iranian blogger and human rights activist writing from Iran, reported that Panahi had been arrested at the cemetery in Tehran where mourners had gathered near the grave of Neda Agha-Soltan. He was able to contact friends in the film industry, both in Iran and internationally, and filmmakers and the news media pressured the Iranian government to release him. He was detained for eight hours. The Iranian government claimed he had been arrested by mistake.

In September 2009, Panahi travelled to Montreal to act as the Head of the Jury at the 2009 Montreal World Film Festival. At the festival he convinced the entire jury to wear green scarves during the opening and closing ceremonies in solidarity with the Green Movement in Iran. He also openly supported and appeared in photographs with Iranian Green Movement protesters at the festival.

In February 2010, Panahi requested to travel to the 60th Berlin Film Festival to participate in the panel discussion on "Iranian Cinema: Present and Future. Expectations inside and outside of Iran". This request was denied.

=== 2010 imprisonment ===
Jafar Panahi
- Status: Convicted
- Convictions: 18 December 2010
- Criminal charge: Propaganda against the regime
- Penalty: 6 years imprisonment 20-year media and travel ban (except for medical treatment and pilgrimage to Mecca)
- Capture status: Upheld after appeal (15 October 2011)
- Accomplices: Mohammad Rasoulof; Mehdi Pourmoussa

Details
- Date apprehended: 1 April 2010; 16 years ago
- Imprisoned at: Evin Prison, Tehran, Iran

On 1 March 2010, Panahi was arrested again. Plainclothes officers took him, his wife Tahereh Saidi, daughter Solmaz Panahi, and 15 of his friends to Evin Prison. Most of the group were released after 48 hours and Mohammad Rasoulof and Mehdi Pourmoussa on 17 March 2010, but Panahi had to remain in section 209 of Evin Prison. The government confirmed his arrest but did not specify the charges.

On 14 April 2010, Iran's Ministry of Culture and Islamic Guidance said that Panahi had been arrested because he had "tried to make a documentary about the unrest that followed the disputed 2009 re-election of President Mahmoud Ahmadinejad."

On 18 May, Panahi sent a message to Abbas Baktiari, director of the Pouya Cultural Center, an Iranian-French cultural organization in Paris, saying that he was being mistreated in prison and his family were being threatened; as a result had begun a hunger strike. On 25 May he was released on US$200,000 bail while awaiting trial.

On 20 December 2010, after convicting Panahi of "assembly and colluding with the intention to commit crimes against the country's national security and propaganda against the Islamic Republic," the Islamic Revolutionary Court sentenced him to six years' imprisonment and a 20-year ban from making or directing any movies, writing screenplays, giving interviews to media, or leaving Iran, except for Hajj holy pilgrimage to Mecca or medical treatment. Panahi's colleague Mohammad Rasoulof also received six years' imprisonment but that sentence was subsequently reduced to one year after appeal.

On 15 October 2011, a court in Tehran upheld Panahi's sentence and ban. Following the decision, Panahi was placed under house arrest. For years he was allowed to move more freely but could not travel outside Iran.

==== International response to the prison and ban sentence ====
The following people and organizations called for his release:

- Filmmakers Ken Loach, the Dardenne brothers, Jon Jost, Walter Salles, Olivier Assayas, Tony Gatlif, Abbas Kiarostami, Kiomars Pourahmad, Bahram Bayzai, Asghar Farhadi, Nasser Taghvai, Kamran Shirdel, and Tahmineh Milani, actors Brian Cox, and Mehdi Hashemi, actresses Fatemeh Motamed-Aria and Golshifteh Farahani, and Juliette Binoche,
- Film critics Roger Ebert, Amy Taubin, David Denby, Kenneth Turan, David Ansen, Jonathan Rosenbaum, and Jean-Michel Frodon,
- Federation of European Film Directors, European Film Academy, Asia Pacific Screen Awards, Network for the Promotion of Asian Cinema, Berlin Film Festival, Karlovy Vary International Film Festival, International Film Festival Rotterdam, Febiofest, National Society of Film Critics, Toronto Film Critics Association and Turkish Cinema Council.

France's Ministry of Foreign Affairs and minister of culture and communications Frédéric Mitterrand, German foreign minister Guido Westerwelle, Government of Canada, Finnish Green MP Rosa Meriläinen and Human Rights Watch have condemned the arrest.

On 8 March 2010, a group of well-known Iranian producers, directors, and actors visited Panahi's family to show their support and call for his immediate release. After more than a week in captivity, Panahi was finally allowed to call his family. On 18 March 2010 he was allowed to have visitors, including his family and lawyer. Iran's culture minister said on 14 April 2010 that Panahi had been arrested because he was "making a film against the regime and it was about the events that followed election." In an interview with AFP in mid-March, Panahi's wife, Tahereh Saeedi, denied that he was making a film about post-election events, saying: "The film was being shot inside the house and had nothing to do with the regime."

In mid-March, 50 Iranian directors, actors and artists signed a petition seeking Panahi's release. American film directors Paul Thomas Anderson, Joel & Ethan Coen, Francis Ford Coppola, Jonathan Demme, Robert De Niro, Curtis Hanson, Jim Jarmusch, Ang Lee, Richard Linklater, Terrence Malick, Michael Moore, Robert Redford, Martin Scorsese, James Schamus, Paul Schrader, Steven Soderbergh, Steven Spielberg, Oliver Stone, and Frederick Wiseman signed a letter on 30 April 2010 urging Panahi's release. The petition ends, "Like artists everywhere, Iran's filmmakers should be celebrated, not censored, repressed, and imprisoned." He was named a member of the jury at the 2010 Cannes Film Festival but because of his imprisonment he could not attend and his chair was symbolically kept empty.

==== Further international response ====
On 23 December 2010, Amnesty International announced that it was mobilizing an online petition spearheaded by Paul Haggis and Nazanin Boniadi and signed by Sean Penn, Martin Scorsese, Harvey Weinstein and others to protest Panahi's sentence.

Cine Foundation International, a "nonprofit film company and human rights NGO aiming to 'empower open consciousness through cinema'" announced on 3 January 2011 that it was launching a campaign of protest films and public actions calling for Panahi's release. "The campaign will include protest films that speak to human rights issues in Iran and throughout the world, six of which are commissioned feature-length, plus twenty shorts. Participating filmmakers may act anonymously or through pseudonyms since voicing their stories can be dangerous. The films, which will address themes of nation, identity, self, spiritual culture, censorship and imprisonment, will be aimed for public, web and various exhibition media". Later in January, CFI deployed a video protest mechanism called White Meadows (named for the Mohammad Rasoulof film The White Meadows, which Panahi edited) and developed by Ericson deJesus (of Yahoo! and frog design) at the foundation's request. The video mechanism "allow(s) anyone in the world to record a short video statement about Panahi and Rasoulof. There will be an ESCAPE button at top, allowing quick exit for those in countries where recording a statement would be dangerous. There will be an option to have the screen black, and soon, voice distortion. The video statements will be recorded as mp4s, giving them maximum transmedia capacity, which essentially makes them broadcastable from any device that can show video". Users can also use the mechanism to comment on how they would "like to see as an international response by the film industry", comment on the state of human rights in general, or "report a human rights abuse to the world".

In his March 2011 greeting to the Iranian people on the occasion of the Iranian New Year, U.S. President Barack Obama cited Panahi's case as an example of Iran's oppressive regime. In April 2011 Time Magazine placed Panahi third on its list of the Top 10 Persecuted Artists who have challenged authority.

In 2011, Boston's American Repertory Theater and System of a Down's Serj Tankian dedicated their production of Prometheus Bound to Panahi and seven other activists, stating in the program notes that "by singing the story of Prometheus, the God who defied the tyrant Zeus by giving the human race both fire and art, this production hopes to give a voice to those currently being silenced or endangered by modern-day oppressors".

On 26 October 2012, Panahi was announced as a co-winner of the European Parliament's Sakharov Prize. He shared the award with Iranian human rights lawyer Nasrin Sotoudeh. European Parliament President Martin Schulz called them "a woman and a man who have not been bowed by fear and intimidation and who have decided to put the fate of their country before their own". Catherine Ashton, the European Union High Representative of the Union for Foreign Affairs and Security Policy, said of the prize, "I am following the case of Nasrin Sotoudeh and other human rights defenders with great concern ... We will continue to campaign for the charges against them to be dropped. We look to Iran to respect the human rights obligations it has signed up to". Panahi's daughter Solmaz accepted the award.

In March 2013, Columbia University professor Hamid Dabashi wrote an article highly critical of Panahi and his decision to continue making films and partially blaming him for the "tragic endings of Iranian cinema". Dabashi had previously written extensively about and praised Panahi's early career. Dabashi called Panahi's two post-arrest films "self-indulgent vagaries farthest removed from" his previous films and wrote that Panahi "should have heeded the vicious sentence and stayed away from his camera for a while and not indulge, for precisely the selfsame social punch that have made his best films knife-sharp precise has now dulled the wit of the filmmaker that was once able to put it to such magnificent use."

In June 2013, Panahi was invited to join the Academy of Motion Picture Arts and Sciences.

In August 2013, shortly after the election of Iranian President Hassan Rouhani, several well-known political prisoners were released. One such prisoner was Panahi's Sakharov Prize co-winner Nasrin Sotoudeh, whose release prompted European Parliament President Martin Schulz to say "We are eagerly waiting to welcome her in Strasbourg together with her Sakharov Prize co-winner, film director Jafar Panahi." A few days earlier the House of Cinema, Iran's largest professional guild for filmmakers, reopened after having been deemed illegal in January 2012.

=== 2022 arrest ===
On 11 July 2022, Panahi was arrested when he went to the prosecutor's office to follow up on the situation of filmmakers Mohammad Rasoulof and Mostafa Aleahmad. He was the third director detained in less than a week. On 1 February 2023, Panahi began a hunger strike, demanding his release from prison. He was released 48 hours later.

=== 2025 sentencing in absentia ===
In December 2025, Panahi, who was out of Iran, was sentenced in absentia to one year in prison and a travel ban over "propaganda activities" against the nation. The sentence included a 2-year ban on leaving Iran and prohibited Panahi from joining any political or social organizations. Panahi's lawyer announced that they would be seeking an appeal regarding the sentencing.

=== 2025–2026 Iran protest ===
During the 2025–2026 Iranian protests and 2026 Iran massacres, Panahi stated that the internet blackout in Iran is a tool of repression, designed to hide the mass killings by the Islamic republic's forces.

On 28 January 2026, Panahi, along with several other Iranian intellectuals, including Amirsalar Davoudi, Hatam Ghaderi, Abolfazl Ghadyani, Mehdi Mahmoudian, Abdollah Momeni, Mohammad Najafi, Mohammad Rasoulof, Nasrin Sotoudeh, and Sedigheh Vasmaghi, and the Narges Mohammadi Human Rights Foundation, published a statement on Instagram asserting that the 2026 Iran massacres were a crime against humanity, accusing Supreme Leader of Iran Ali Khamenei of holding principal responsibility.

=== 2026 return to Iran ===
In April 2026, Panahi returned to Iran by land via Turkey due to flight restrictions during the Iran war, following the end of the commercial campaign for his last film in the West. In June 2026, Tehran’s Revolutionary Court has upheld the 2025 sentencing to one-year prison sentence on charges of engaging in propaganda activities against the Iranian state. Panahi’s lawyer Mostafa Nili announced the decision by the court to reject the director’s appeal. This sentence can be appealed to the Tehran Provincial Court of Appeal.

In October 2026, Panahi was sentenced to an additional five years and one month in prison. The charges, and Panahi's whereabouts, are unknown as of late October 2026, although he is thought to still be in Iran. His lawyer stated that his bank accounts have been frozen.

== Style ==
Panahi's style is often described as an Iranian form of neorealism. Or, in his own words, capturing the "humanitarian aspects of things." Jake Wilson describes his films as connected by a "tension between documentary immediacy and a set of strictly defined formal parameters" in addition to "overtly expressed anger at the restrictions that Iranian society imposes".

Panahi differs from his fellow realist filmmaker Abbas Kiarostami in the explicitness of his social critique. Stephen Teo wrote:

"Panahi's films redefine the humanitarian themes of contemporary Iranian cinema, firstly, by treating the problems of women in modern Iran, and secondly, by depicting human characters as 'non-specific persons'—more like figures who nevertheless remain full-blooded characters, holding on to the viewer's attention and gripping the senses. Like the best Iranian directors who have won acclaim on the world stage, Panahi evokes humanitarianism in an unsentimental, realistic fashion, without necessarily overriding political and social messages. In essence, this has come to define the particular aesthetic of Iranian cinema. So powerful is this sensibility that we seem to have no other mode of looking at Iranian cinema other than to equate it with a universal concept of humanitarianism."

Panahi says his style can be described as "humanitarian events interpreted in a poetic and artistic way". "In a world where films are made with millions of dollars, we made a film about a little girl who wants to buy a fish for less than a dollar [The White Balloon]—this is what we're trying to show", he said. Panahi has said that "in all of my films, you never see an evil character, male or female. I believe everyone is a good person."

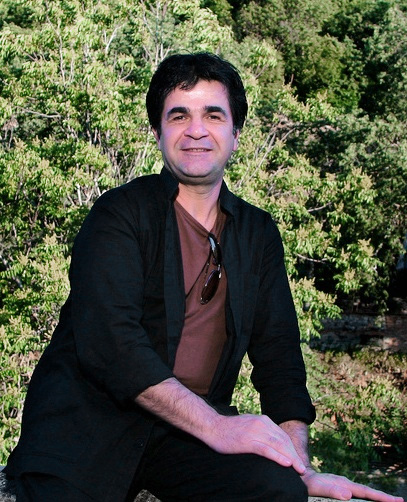
Panahi at Cines del Sur in 2007

In an interview with Anthony Kaufman, Panahi said: "I was very conscious of not trying to play with people's emotions; we were not trying to create tear-jerking scenes. So it engages people's intellectual side. But this is with assistance from the emotional aspect and a combination of the two."

Hamid Dabashi has called Panahi the least self-conscious filmmaker in the history of Iranian film and said that his films represent a post-revolutionary Iranian outlook on itself, calling Crimson Gold not just a history of a failed jewellery robbery "but also [a history] of recent Iranian history, the history of the failed Islamic revolution and the Iran-Iraq war in particular."

Dabashi praises Panahi's restrained depiction of violence, saying that his "manner of showing violence without showing who has perpetrated it has now become a trademark of Panahi's cinema." Dabashi specifically cites Razieh's brother in The White Balloon as clearly having been beaten in one scene, but only being given hints of the violence of Razieh's father from off screen. In The Circle Nargress has been beaten but we are never told why or by whom. Dabashi writes, "violence in Panahi's cinema is like a phantom: you see through it, but it lacks a source or physical presence—who has perpetrated it is made intentionally amorphous. The result is a sense of fear and anxiety that lurks in every frame of his film, but it is a fear without an identifiable referent."

Some Iranians have criticized his work, claiming that his films "don't draw a realistic picture of Iran, or that the difficulties encountered by women in [his] films apply to only a certain class of women."

== Personal life ==
Panahi is married to Tahereh (or Tahere) Saidi, whom he first met in college when she was working as a nurse. They have a son, Panah Panahi, a filmmaker, and a daughter, Solmaz. Panah attended the University of Tehran, and Solmaz studied theater in Tehran.

== Filmography ==
=== Feature films ===
Year	English Title	Original Title	Notes
1995	The White Balloon	بادکنک سفید	
1997	The Mirror	آینه	
2000	The Circle	دایره	
2003	Crimson Gold	طلای سرخ	
2006	Offside	آفساید	co-written by Shadmehr Rastin
2011	This Is Not a Film	این فیلم نیست	documentary; co-directed by Mojtaba Mirtahmasb
2013	Closed Curtain	پرده	co-directed by Kambuzia Partovi
2015	Taxi	تاکسی	
2018	3 Faces	سه رخ	co-written with Nader Saeivar
2022	No Bears	خرس نیست	
2025	It Was Just an Accident	یک تصادف ساده	

=== Short films ===
Year	Title	Original Title	Notes
1988	The Wounded Heads	Yarali Bashlar	documentary
1991	Kish		documentary
1992	The Friend	Doust	
1992	The Last Exam	Akharin Emtehan	
1993	A Second Look	Negah-E Dovom	documentary
1997	Ardekoul		documentary
2007	Untying the Knot		segment in Persian Carpet (Farsh-e Irani)
2010	The Accordion		segment in THEN AND NOW Beyond Borders and Differences film series for Art for The World
2020	Hidden		
2021	Life	شاهد	segment in The Year of the Everlasting Storm

=== Other credits ===
Year	Title	Credit	Director
1991	The Fish	Assistant director	Kambuzia Partovi
1994	Through the Olive Trees	Assistant director, actor	Abbas Kiarostami
1997	Traveler from the South	Editor	Parviz Shahbazi
2005	Verdict	Editor	Masud Kimiai
2005	Border Café	Editor	Kambuzia Partovi
2009	The White Meadows	Editor	Mohammad Rasoulof
2021	Hit the Road	Producer	Panah Panahi
2022	No End	Editor	Nader Saeivar
2024	The Witness	Editor, co-writer	Nader Saeivar
2026	Hijamat	Editor, producer	Nader Saeivar

== Accolades ==
=== Awards and nominations ===
Award	Year	Category	Work	Result	Ref.
AARP Movies for Grownups Awards	2026	Best Foreign Language Film	It Was Just an Accident	Nominated	
Academy Awards	2026	Best Original Screenplay	It Was Just an Accident	Nominated	
Antalya Golden Orange Film Festival	2018	Golden Orange for Best Film	3 Faces	Won	
Asian Film Awards	2007	Best Director	Offside	Nominated	
Asia Pacific Screen Awards	2025	Best Film	It Was Just an Accident	Won	
Asia Pacific Screen Awards	2025	Best Director	It Was Just an Accident	Won	
Astra Film Awards	2026	Best Picture – Drama	It Was Just an Accident	Nominated	
Astra Film Awards	2026	Best International Feature	It Was Just an Accident	Nominated	
Berlin International Film Festival	2006	Silver Bear Jury Grand Prix	Offside	Won	
Berlin International Film Festival	2013	Silver Bear for Best Script	Closed Curtain	Won	
Berlin International Film Festival	2015	Golden Bear	Taxi	Won	
Berlin International Film Festival	2015	FIPRESCI Prize	Taxi	Won	
Bodil Awards	2002	Best Non-American Film	The Circle	Nominated	
British Independent Film Awards	2025	Best International Independent Film	It Was Just an Accident	Nominated	
Busan International Film Festival	2025	The Asian Filmmaker	—N/a	Honoured	
Cannes Film Festival	1995	Caméra d'Or	The White Balloon	Won	
Cannes Film Festival	2003	Un Certain Regard Jury Prize	Crimson Gold	Won	
Cannes Film Festival	2011	Carrosse d'Or	—N/a	Honored	
Cannes Film Festival	2018	Best Screenplay	3 Faces	Won	
Cannes Film Festival	2018	Palme d'Or	3 Faces	Nominated	
Cannes Film Festival	2025	Palme d'Or	It Was Just an Accident	Won	
Cannes Film Festival	2025	Prix de la Citoyenneté	It Was Just an Accident	Won	
Capri Hollywood International Film Festival	2025	Best International Feature Film	It Was Just an Accident	Won	
Capri Hollywood International Film Festival	2025	Best Original Screenplay	It Was Just an Accident	Won	
César Awards	2016	Best Foreign Film	Taxi	Nominated	
Chicago International Film Festival	2003	Gold Hugo	Crimson Gold	Won	
Chicago International Film Festival	2022	Award for Cinematic Bravery	No Bears	Won	
Cinema Eye Honors	2016	Heterodox Award	Taxi	Won	
Critics' Choice Awards	2025	Best Foreign Language Film	It Was Just an Accident	Nominated	
European Film Awards	2026	European Film	It Was Just an Accident	Nominated	
European Film Awards	2026	European Director	It Was Just an Accident	Nominated	
European Film Awards	2026	European Screenwriter	It Was Just an Accident	Nominated	
European Film Awards	2026	LUX Audience Award	It Was Just an Accident	Nominated	
European Parliament	2012	Sakharov Prize	—N/a	Honored	
Filmfest Hamburg	2018	Douglas Sirk Award	—N/a	Won	
Golden Globe Awards	2025	Best Director	It Was Just an Accident	Nominated	
Golden Globe Awards	2025	Best Screenplay	It Was Just an Accident	Nominated	
Gotham Independent Film Awards	2025	Best Director	It Was Just an Accident	Won	
Gotham Independent Film Awards	2025	Best Original Screenplay	It Was Just an Accident	Won	
Gotham Independent Film Awards	2025	Best International Feature	It Was Just an Accident	Won	
Locarno Film Festival	1997	Golden Leopard	The Mirror	Won	
Los Angeles Film Critics Association	2025	Best Screenplay	It Was Just an Accident	Won	
Los Angeles Film Critics Association	2025	Best Foreign Language Film	It Was Just an Accident	Runner-up	
Middleburg Film Festival	2025	Impact Award	—N/a	Honored	
Mill Valley Film Festival	2025	Audience Award – Independent	It Was Just an Accident	Won	
Montclair Film Festival	2025	Audience Award for World Cinema	It Was Just an Accident	Won	
National Board of Review	2025	Best International Film	It Was Just an Accident	Won	
National Society of Film Critics	2012	Award for Experimental	This Is Not a Film	Won	
National Society of Film Critics	2022	Best Director	No Bears	Nominated	
New York Film Critics Circle	2022	Special Award	—N/a	Honored	
New York Film Critics Circle	2025	Best Director	It Was Just an Accident	Won	
Online Film Critics Society	2012	Best Documentary	This Is Not a Film	Won	
Online Film Critics Society	2012	Special Award	This Is Not a Film	Won	
Rome Film Festival	2025	Lifetime Achievement Award	—N/a	Honoured	
Singapore International Film Festival	1998	Special Jury Prize	The Mirror	Won	
Singapore International Film Festival	1998	Best Director – Asian Feature Film	The Mirror	Won	
Singapore International Film Festival	2024	Cinema Honorary Award	—N/a	Honored	
Sydney Film Festival	2025	Sydney Film Prize	It Was Just an Accident	Won	
Taormina Film Fest	2010	Taormina Arte Award	—N/a	Honored	
Telluride Film Festival	2025	Silver Medallion	—N/a	Honored	
Time 100	2026	100 Most Influential People	—N/a	Honored	
Tokyo International Film Festival	1995	Gold Prize	The White Balloon	Won	
Toronto Film Critics Association	2025	Best Foreign Language Film	It Was Just an Accident	Runner-up	
Toronto International Film Festival	2025	Special Tribute Award	—N/a	Honored	
Valladolid International Film Festival	2003	Golden Spike	Crimson Gold	Won	
Venice Film Festival	2000	Golden Lion	The Circle	Won	
Venice Film Festival	2000	FIPRESCI Prize	The Circle	Won	
Venice Film Festival	2010	Lina Mangiacapre Prize – Special Mention	The Accordion	Won	
Venice Film Festival	2022	Golden Lion	No Bears	Nominated	
Venice Film Festival	2022	Special Jury Prize	No Bears	Won	

=== Film festival jury memberships ===
Year	Festival	Role	Ref.
2001	Karlovy Vary International Film Festival	Jury member	
2007	Eurasia International Film Festival	Jury member	
2007	International Film Festival of Kerala	Chair of the Jury	
2008	International Film Festival Rotterdam	Jury member	
2009	Montreal World Film Festival	President of the Jury	

== See also ==
- Cinema of Iran
- Intellectual movements in Iran
- List of Iranian Academy Award winners and nominees
