= New York Film Critics Circle Award for Best Director =

Award

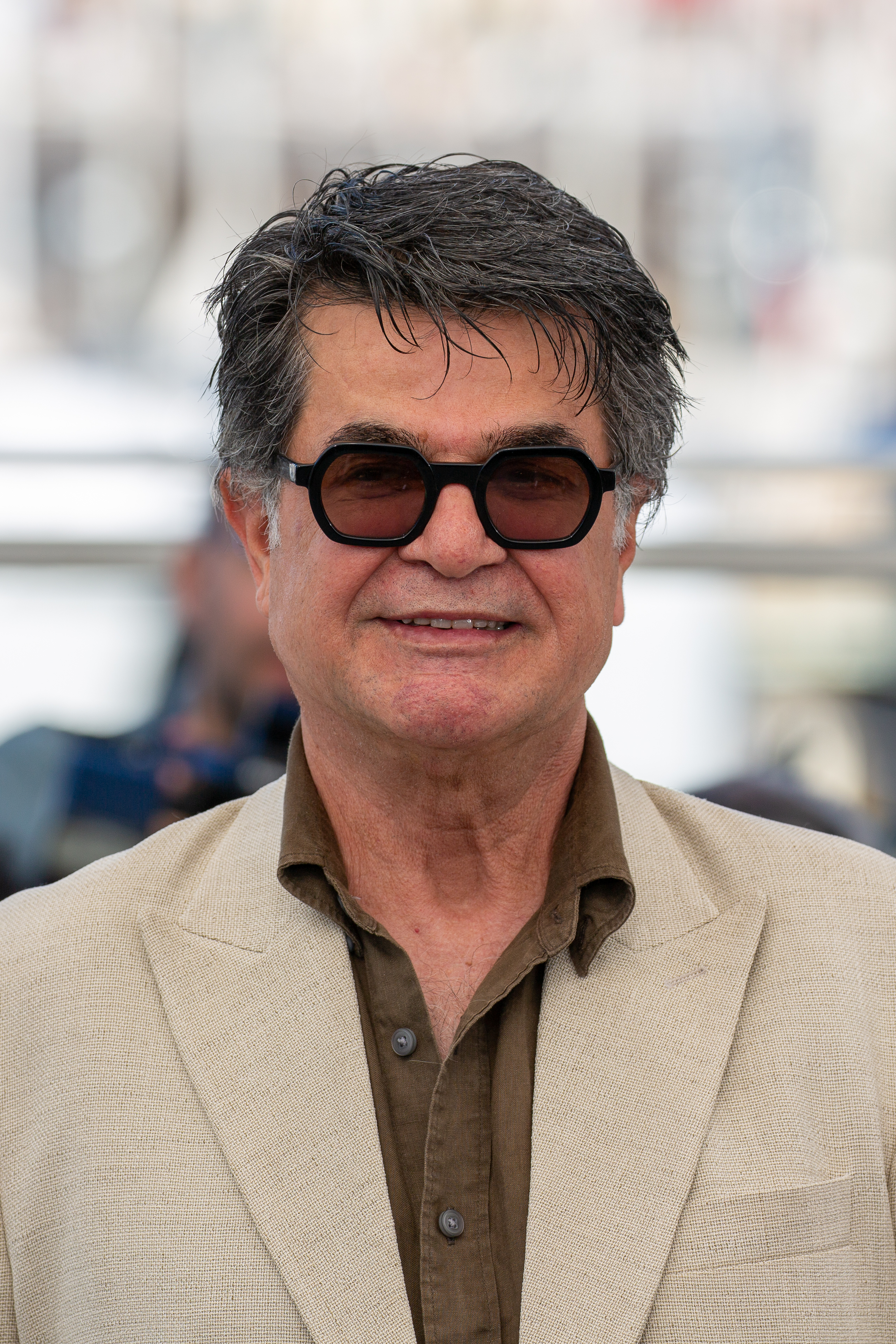
- Current recipient: Jafar Panahi
- Awarded for: Best Director
- Country: United States
- Presented by: New York Film Critics Circle
- First award: John Ford; The Informer (1935)
- Currently held by: Jafar Panahi; It Was Just an Accident (2025)
- Website: nyfcc.com

The New York Film Critics Circle Award for Best Director is an award given by the New York Film Critics Circle, honoring the finest achievements in filmmaking.

== Winners ==
=== 1930s ===
Year	Winner	Film
1935	John Ford	The Informer
1936	Rouben Mamoulian	The Gay Desperado
1937	Gregory La Cava	Stage Door
1938	Alfred Hitchcock	The Lady Vanishes
1939	John Ford	Stagecoach

=== 1940s ===
Year	Winner	Film
1940	John Ford	The Grapes of Wrath
1940	John Ford	The Long Voyage Home
1941	John Ford	How Green Was My Valley
1942	John Farrow	Wake Island
1943	George Stevens	The More the Merrier
1944	Leo McCarey	Going My Way
1945	Billy Wilder	The Lost Weekend
1946	William Wyler	The Best Years of Our Lives
1947	Elia Kazan	Boomerang
1947	Elia Kazan	Gentleman's Agreement
1948	John Huston	The Treasure of the Sierra Madre
1949	Carol Reed	The Fallen Idol

=== 1950s ===
Year	Winner	Film
1950	Joseph L. Mankiewicz	All About Eve
1951	Elia Kazan	A Streetcar Named Desire
1952	Fred Zinnemann	High Noon
1953	Fred Zinnemann	From Here to Eternity
1954	Elia Kazan	On the Waterfront
1955	David Lean	Summertime
1956	John Huston	Moby Dick
1957	David Lean	The Bridge on the River Kwai
1958	Stanley Kramer	The Defiant Ones
1959	Fred Zinnemann	The Nun's Story

=== 1960s ===
Year	Winner	Film
1960	Jack Cardiff	Sons and Lovers
1960	Billy Wilder	The Apartment
1961	Robert Rossen	The Hustler
1962	No award given (newspaper strike)	
1963	Tony Richardson	Tom Jones
1964	Stanley Kubrick	Dr. Strangelove
1965	John Schlesinger	Darling
1966	Fred Zinnemann	A Man for All Seasons
1967	Mike Nichols	The Graduate
1968	Paul Newman	Rachel, Rachel
1969	Costa-Gavras	Z

=== 1970s ===
Year	Winner	Film
1970	Bob Rafelson	Five Easy Pieces
1971	Stanley Kubrick	A Clockwork Orange
1972	Ingmar Bergman	Cries and Whispers
1973	François Truffaut	Day for Night
1974	Federico Fellini	Amarcord
1975	Robert Altman	Nashville
1976	Alan J. Pakula	All the President's Men
1977	Woody Allen	Annie Hall
1978	Terrence Malick	Days of Heaven
1979	Woody Allen	Manhattan

=== 1980s ===
Year	Winner	Film
1980	Jonathan Demme	Melvin and Howard
1981	Sidney Lumet	Prince of the City
1982	Sydney Pollack	Tootsie
1983	Ingmar Bergman	Fanny and Alexander
1984	David Lean	A Passage to India
1985	John Huston	Prizzi's Honor
1986	Woody Allen	Hannah and Her Sisters
1987	James L. Brooks	Broadcast News
1988	Chris Menges	A World Apart
1989	Paul Mazursky	Enemies, A Love Story

=== 1990s ===
Year	Winner	Film
1990	Martin Scorsese	Goodfellas
1991	Jonathan Demme	The Silence of the Lambs
1992	Robert Altman	The Player
1993	Jane Campion	The Piano
1994	Quentin Tarantino	Pulp Fiction
1995	Ang Lee	Sense and Sensibility
1996	Lars von Trier	Breaking the Waves
1997	Curtis Hanson	L.A. Confidential
1998	Terrence Malick	The Thin Red Line
1999	Mike Leigh	Topsy-Turvy

=== 2000s ===
Year	Winner	Film
2000	Steven Soderbergh	Erin Brockovich
2000	Steven Soderbergh	Traffic
2001	Robert Altman	Gosford Park
2002	Todd Haynes	Far from Heaven
2003	Sofia Coppola	Lost in Translation
2004	Clint Eastwood	Million Dollar Baby
2005	Ang Lee	Brokeback Mountain
2006	Martin Scorsese	The Departed
2007	Joel Coen and Ethan Coen	No Country for Old Men
2008	Mike Leigh	Happy-Go-Lucky
2009	Kathryn Bigelow	The Hurt Locker

=== 2010s ===
Year	Winner	Film
2010	David Fincher	The Social Network
2011	Michel Hazanavicius	The Artist
2012	Kathryn Bigelow	Zero Dark Thirty
2013	Steve McQueen	12 Years a Slave
2014	Richard Linklater	Boyhood
2015	Todd Haynes	Carol
2016	Barry Jenkins	Moonlight
2017	Sean Baker	The Florida Project
2018	Alfonso Cuarón	Roma
2019	Josh Safdie and Benny Safdie	Uncut Gems

=== 2020s ===
Year	Winner	Film
2020	Chloé Zhao	Nomadland
2021	Jane Campion	The Power of the Dog
2022	S. S. Rajamouli	RRR
2023	Christopher Nolan	Oppenheimer
2024	RaMell Ross	Nickel Boys
2025	Jafar Panahi	It Was Just an Accident

== Multiple winners ==
18 directors have won the award multiple times.

Wins	Director
4	John Ford
3	Woody Allen
3	Robert Altman
3	John Huston
3	Elia Kazan
3	David Lean
3	Fred Zinnemann
2	Ingmar Bergman
2	Kathryn Bigelow
2	Jane Campion
2	Jonathan Demme
2	Todd Haynes
2	Stanley Kubrick
2	Ang Lee
2	Mike Leigh
2	Terrence Malick
2	Martin Scorsese
2	Billy Wilder
