= Astra Film Award for Best Picture =

Award given by Hollywood Creative Alliance

- Awarded for: Best Motion Picture – Drama; Best Motion Picture – Comedy or Musical
- Location: Los Angeles, California
- Presented by: Hollywood Creative Alliance
- First award: The Shape of Water (2017)
- Currently held by: Drama: Sinners (2025); Comedy or Musical: One Battle After Another (2025)
- Website: theastras.com

The Astra Film Award for Best Motion Picture – Drama and the Astra Award for Best Motion Picture – Comedy or Musical are two of the annual awards given out by the Hollywood Creative Alliance. Prior to 2025, the category was combined as a single Astra Film Award for Best Picture.

== Winners ==
- † = Winner of the Academy Award for Best Picture
- ‡ = Nominated for the Academy Award for Best Picture

=== 2010s ===
Year	Film	Director
2017	The Shape of Water †	Guillermo del Toro
2017	The Big Sick	Michael Showalter
2017	Call Me by Your Name ‡	Luca Guadagnino
2017	Colossal	Nacho Vigalondo
2017	Get Out ‡	Jordan Peele
2017	I, Tonya	Craig Gillespie
2017	Lady Bird ‡	Greta Gerwig
2017	Molly's Game	Aaron Sorkin
2017	The Post ‡	Steven Spielberg
2017	Three Billboards Outside Ebbing, Missouri ‡	Martin McDonagh
2018	The Hate U Give	George Tillman Jr.
2018	A Quiet Place	John Krasinski
2018	A Star Is Born ‡	Bradley Cooper
2018	BlacKkKlansman ‡	Spike Lee
2018	Black Panther ‡	Ryan Coogler
2018	Eighth Grade	Bo Burnham
2018	The Favourite ‡	Yorgos Lanthimos
2018	Green Book †	Peter Farrelly
2018	Roma ‡	Alfonso Cuarón
2018	Searching	Aneesh Chaganty
2019	1917 ‡	Sam Mendes
2019	Booksmart	Olivia Wilde
2019	The Farewell	Lulu Wang
2019	The Irishman ‡	Martin Scorsese
2019	Jojo Rabbit ‡	Taika Waititi
2019	Joker ‡	Todd Phillips
2019	Marriage Story ‡	Noah Baumbach
2019	Once Upon a Time... in Hollywood ‡	Quentin Tarantino
2019	Parasite †	Bong Joon-ho
2019	Waves	Trey Edward Shults

=== 2020s ===
Year	Category	Film	Director
2020		Promising Young Woman ‡	Emerald Fennell
2020		Da 5 Bloods	Spike Lee
2020		The Father ‡	Florian Zeller
2020		Judas and the Black Messiah ‡	Shaka King
2020		Minari ‡	Lee Isaac Chung
2020		Nomadland †	Chloé Zhao
2020		One Night in Miami...	Regina King
2020		Soul	Pete Docter & Kemp Powers
2020		Sound of Metal ‡	Darius Marder
2020		The Trial of the Chicago 7 ‡	Aaron Sorkin
2021		CODA †	Siân Heder
2021		Being the Ricardos	Aaron Sorkin
2021		Belfast ‡	Kenneth Branagh
2021		Dune ‡	Denis Villeneuve
2021		King Richard ‡	Reinaldo Marcus Green
2021		Last Night in Soho	Edgar Wright
2021		Licorice Pizza ‡	Paul Thomas Anderson
2021		The Power of the Dog ‡	Jane Campion
2021		Spencer	Pablo Larraín
2021		tick, tick... BOOM!	Lin Manuel Miranda
2022		Everything Everywhere All at Once †	Daniel Kwan and Daniel Scheinert
2022		Avatar: The Way of Water ‡	James Cameron
2022		The Banshees of Inisherin ‡	Martin McDonagh
2022		Elvis ‡	Baz Luhrmann
2022		The Fabelmans ‡	Steven Spielberg
2022		RRR	S. S. Rajamouli
2022		Tár ‡	Todd Field
2022		Top Gun: Maverick ‡	Joseph Kosinski
2022		The Woman King	Gina Prince-Bythewood
2022		Women Talking ‡	Sarah Polley
2023		Barbie ‡	Greta Gerwig
2023		Air	Ben Affleck
2023		American Fiction ‡	Cord Jefferson
2023		The Color Purple	Blitz Bazawule
2023		The Holdovers ‡	Alexander Payne
2023		Killers of the Flower Moon ‡	Martin Scorsese
2023		Maestro ‡	Bradley Cooper
2023		Oppenheimer †	Christopher Nolan
2023		Past Lives ‡	Celine Song
2023		Spider-Man: Across the Spider-Verse	Joaquim Dos Santos, Kemp Powers, & Justin K. Thompson
2024		Wicked ‡	Jon M. Chu
2024		Anora †	Sean Baker
2024		A Real Pain	Jesse Eisenberg
2024		Challengers	Luca Guadagnino
2024		Conclave ‡	Edward Berger
2024		Dune: Part Two ‡	Denis Villeneuve
2024		Emilia Pérez ‡	Jacques Audiard
2024		Sing Sing	Greg Kwedar
2024		The Brutalist ‡	Brady Corbet
2024		The Substance ‡	Coralie Fargeat
2025	Drama	Sinners ‡	Ryan Coogler
2025	Drama	Frankenstein ‡	Guillermo del Toro
2025	Drama	Hamnet ‡	Chloé Zhao
2025	Drama	It Was Just an Accident	Jafar Panahi
2025	Drama	Sentimental Value ‡	Joachim Trier
2025	Drama	Train Dreams ‡	Clint Bently
2025	Comedy or Musical	One Battle After Another †	Paul Thomas Anderson
2025	Comedy or Musical	Bugonia ‡	Yorgos Lanthimos
2025	Comedy or Musical	Jay Kelly	Noah Baumbach
2025	Comedy or Musical	Marty Supreme ‡	Josh Safdie
2025	Comedy or Musical	No Other Choice	Park Chan-wook
2025	Comedy or Musical	Wicked: For Good	Jon M. Chu
