= Hit the Road (2021 film) =

- International poster
- Directed by: Panah Panahi
- Written by: Panah Panahi
- Produced by: Panah Panahi; Mastaneh Mohajer
- Starring: Hassan Madjooni; Pantea Panahiha; Rayan Sarlak; Amin Simiar
- Cinematography: Amin Jafari
- Edited by: Ashkan Mehri; Amir Etminan
- Music by: Peyman Yazdanian
- Release date: 10 July 2021 (Cannes)
- Running time: 93 minutes
- Country: Iran
- Language: Persian
- Box office: $890,145

Hit the Road (Persian: جاده خاکی, romanized: Jadde Khaki, lit. 'Dirt Road') is a 2021 Iranian road comedy-drama film written and directed by Panah Panahi in his feature debut. It depicts an Iranian family driving to the Azerbaijani border to smuggle their young adult son out of the country. It premiered in the Directors' Fortnight sidebar at the 2021 Cannes Film Festival, and won top prizes at the BFI London Film Festival and the Singapore International Film Festival.

== Cast ==
- Hassan Madjooni as Khosrow, the father: A dry humored man with a broken leg who is oftentimes not taken seriously by the rest of his family. He shows signs of agitation when his advice is not accounted for yet he rarely speaks up to defend himself; instead resorting to humor to cover for his apparent lack of communication.
- Pantea Panahiha as the mother: A gentle yet strong willed woman who assumes the caretaker role of the family as Khosrow, her husband, remains relatively immobile for the duration of the film. Throughout Hit the Road, she attempts to bring the mood up with singing, dancing, and humor, which is rejected by her eldest son, Farid. Her happy facade slowly begins to crack as the family closes in on their destination, and she fights to control her emotions for the sake of her family.
- Rayan Sarlak as the younger brother: A young, fiery, and headstrong boy who helps drive the plot with his morbid statements as well as unsure thoughts of the future. He is kept in the dark for the true reason of the road trip, which causes tension with the rest of his family as his failure to know the truth leads him to act insensitively to those around him.
- Amin Simiar as Farid, the elder brother: A young man who remains fairly quiet for the beginning of the film, who eventually shows anger towards his mother for revealing her emotions. His attitude stems from the reality of his situation, as he is driving towards the unknown after running into assumed trouble with the government. At times he displays ungrateful behavior towards his parents, which is fueled by the general denial of his fate.

== Production ==
=== Pre-production ===
The film was inspired by Panah Panahi's experience with exile from Iran; his sister Solmaz Panahi was arrested for appearing in one of their father's film. Their father, Jafar Panahi, has also been arrested by the Iranian government multiple times for his films, most recently in July of 2022.

P. Panahi draws from social turmoil inside the country and says that, "in the society in which I live, the perspective is shrinking and shrinking. The only way out is exile, to try to escape from this country." He also took inspiration from his close friends who also had to exile themselves from the country, and their testimonies led to the plot's interactions and experiences with the exile plan.

Panahi himself has considered exile, but he said, "The problem is that since cinema is my passion and only way of expression, I cannot make films elsewhere. I can only make films about people that I know intimately, people whose relationships I know."

When he proposed the film, he was forced to produce a fake script in order for the film to be approved by the committees of Issuance of Film Production Permit and Issuance of Film Screening Permit, underneath the Ministry of Culture and Islamic Guidance.

=== Production ===
During the filming of Hit the Road, Panah Panahi held auditions for the core family, but when he found Rayan Sarlak, he knew he found the right actor for the younger brother character. On-set, Panahi describes Sarlak's behavior as energetic, so he had to work with Sarlak to get his energy at the right level for the take he films. For the audition process for Farid, the older brother, Panahi noted that Amin Simiar acted nervous during his audition, so he intentionally kept Simiar in the same mindset by instructing his crew to not act friendly to the actor.

While filming the car scenes, he cites Abbas Kiarostami and his father Jafar Panahi as an influence for how he captures the car onscreen. Within Iranian cinema, the car as a symbol often represents freedom of expression and also public and private space rolled into one, so Panah Panahi refers to this space as a place "without having to submit to the silly regulations."

=== Post-production and music ===
Throughout Hit the Road, music and singing are present. Panahi "wanted the film to be completely into this idea of contrast, of contradiction", in which there "is always joy and sadness, laughter and tears [and this comes] from using these two kinds of music: classical music and Iranian pop music." Piano Sonata No. 20 (Schubert) frequently plays in the background of the film, often during pensive moments.

Other songs are not only in the background, underscoring and emphasizing certain emotions, but the characters often sing along. The mother sings to a 1950s song by Delkash in the beginning, the mother and father sing to "Soghati," a song by Hayedeh after a tense conversation with their older son, the young boy dances to Shahram Shabpareh's "Deyar" near the end of the film, and the family buries their dog to "Shad Zadeh" by Ebi, like a music video. Many of these songs contain lyrics that discuss themes of exile and alienation.

=== Breaking censorship ===
Operating under the Iranian censorship rules, Panahi breaks two of them, both regarding the mother character, played by Pantea Panahiha. Regarding the clothing, Iranian censorship forces actresses to completely veil their hair, but Panahiha's character's veil appears partially unveiled, revealing her gray hair. The other broken rule, one for the whole Iranian state, is that women cannot sing in the presence of men, which the mother character does during one of the songs from the soundtrack. Regarding these rules, Panahi states that "he didn't want to censor himself" with these choices; he also recognizes the problem with portraying women under the censorship rules and cites that in order to realistically portray women outside the rules, the location has to be set in the car, which partially explains the reason for containing the narrative inside the family's car.

== Release ==
In July 2021, Picturehouse Entertainment acquired distribution rights to the film for the United Kingdom and Ireland. In August 2021, Kino Lorber acquired US rights. The film was released in the US on 22 April 2022.

So far, the film has not received a theatrical release in Iran, although it has been released on two Iranian streaming services for a period of time.

== Reception ==
On review aggregator website Rotten Tomatoes, the film holds an approval rating of 95%, based on 91 reviews, and an average rating of 8.4/10. The website's critical consensus states: "A beautifully acted drama with steadily cumulative force, Hit the Road uses one family's journey to make trenchant observations about society as a whole". On Metacritic, the film has a weighted average score of 90 out of 100, based on 28 critics, indicating "universal acclaim".

Wendy Ide of Screen International wrote, "Thrillingly inventive, satisfyingly textured and infused with warmth and humanity, this is a triumph." Jessica Kiang of Variety wrote, "its 93 minutes whip by so airily, it's possible not to realize how much you've learned to love the family whose road trip you've shared in, until the credits roll and you immediately start to miss them."

David Ehrlich at IndieWire gave the film an A− grade, calling it "a film that swerves between tragedy and gallows humor with the expert control of a stunt driver". Roxana Hadadi of New York wrote, "There is a sparseness to Hit the Road that reveals the intuitiveness of Panahi's filmmaking, his grasp of these characters and how they tug and poke at each other, and his understanding of the ways fear, paranoia, and loss turn us into people we might not like, let alone recognize."

In June 2025, IndieWire ranked the film at number 41 on its list of "The 100 Best Movies of the 2020s (So Far)."
