= Racewalkers =

- Directed by: Kevin Claydon; Phil Moniz
- Screenplay by: Kevin Claydon; Phil Moniz; Evan Landry
- Produced by: Robbie Amell; Jeff Chan; Evan Landry; Alex Paquin; Chris Pare; Amanda Pileggi
- Starring: Kevin Claydon; Phil Moniz; Robbie Amell; Greg Bryk
- Cinematography: Mat Barkley
- Music by: Ryan Taubert
- Production companies: Collective Pictures; Bobby F. Productions; Zerotrillion Pictures
- Release date: February 21, 2025 (Slamdance)
- Running time: 80 minutes
- Country: Canada
- Language: English

Racewalkers is a 2025 Canadian sports comedy film, directed by Kevin Claydon and Phil Moniz. The film stars Moniz as Will, a man who aspires to become a track and field coach but is struggling to get taken seriously because of his dwarfism, but whose opportunity arrives when he meets Matt (Claydon), a washed-up baseball player looking for a new purpose in his life, and begins to train and coach Matt to compete in the sport of race walking.

The film also stars Greg Bryk and Robbie Amell as Kurt and Ched Lester, a hypercompetitive father-son racing team whom Will and Matt must battle in the race walking competition, as well as Jess Salgueiro, Milton Barnes, Ryan Blakely, Rebekah Francoz, Trevor Hayes and Italia Ricci in supporting roles.

== Production ==
The film is the full-length directorial debut for both Moniz and Claydon, longtime friends best known as co-creators of the web series Short Term Sentence. They worked on the film out of a desire to create a feel-good sports comedy comparable to Major League, Happy Gilmore or Cool Runnings.

The filmmakers worked with real-life race walking competitors to ensure that the film would not "punch down", but instead would balance the humour in the sport's slightly goofy appearance with a respectful portrait of just how physically demanding it actually is.

Olympic race walker Evan Dunfee served as a creative consultant on the film, and appears as a background extra during the race.

== Distribution ==
The film premiered at the 2025 Slamdance Film Festival, and had its Canadian premiere at the 2025 Blue Mountain Film Festival.

It was also screened in the Screenability program at the 72nd Sydney Film Festival.

== Critical response ==
Emma Badame of That Shelf wrote that "Claydon and Moniz’s script is sharp and even occasionally–and wonderfully–slapstick, and the whole production manages to take the mickey out of the athletic event without ever punching down. Everyone is in on the joke, which makes it that much more enjoyable. It’s a sport that may look odd, but which takes clear stamina and real ability, and the filmmakers ensure that comes across in between the well-placed punchlines. There’s a great display of over-the-top villainy here, too, with both Bryk and Amell revelling in the chance to make a full meal of the scenery. All you need to know about Amell’s character is right there in his moniker: Ched. And if that weren’t enough, his douchebag look is one for the books: short shorts, a faux-hawk and Pit Vipers. With his inability to comprehend proper trash talk and appropriate expressions, he also brings to mind Biff Tannen in Back to the Future, if Biff had any kind of natural athletic ability."

For Film Inquiry, Kristy Strouse stated that "with a nostalgic soundtrack that complements its uplifting tone, Racewalkers feels like a love letter to the kinds of movies that remind us why we watch film in the first place. It isn’t asking much of you as a viewer except to watch and enjoy. The balance of smart writing, strong performances, and well-timed humor makes this not just a sports film, but a feel-good escape, full of laughs and emotional payoff. This is an indie absolutely worth discovering and shows us a dynamic duo in its creators and stars: they are artists to watch."

Peter Gray of The AU Review wrote that "Moniz and Claydon are aware of how comical the sport looks, but they also take their subject on with sincerity, which is why their wonderfully sweet film succeeds as much as it does." He added that "most importantly, Racewalkers is very, very funny. The ensemble all playing their characters as straight as possible only adds to the comedic mentality, with their [sic] being a fine balance in amplifying some of the sport’s theatrical flair – Matt’s hip swivel is described as looking like a “coked out salsa dancer” – with a genuine respect as to how physically demanding it is. Moniz and Claydon have a wonderfully subtle approach to delivering their comedy, whilst Amell is able to lean into Ched’s competitive nature with a more exaggerated approach, but in doing so he underplays the character’s awareness, which only makes him all the funnier."

== Awards ==
Award	Date of ceremony	Category	Recipient(s)	Result	Ref.
Slamdance Film Festival	2025	Unstoppable Feature Grand Jury Prize	Phil Moniz, Kevin Claydon	Won	
Blue Mountain Film Festival	2025	Festival Fave	Phil Moniz, Kevin Claydon	Won	
