= 3 Faces =

2018 Iranian drama film

- French theatrical poster
- Directed by: Jafar Panahi
- Written by: Jafar Panahi; Nader Saeivar
- Starring: Behnaz Jafari; Jafar Panahi; Marziyeh Rezaei; Maedeh Erteghaei
- Cinematography: Amin Jafari
- Edited by: Mastaneh Mohajer; Panah Panahi
- Production company: Jafar Panahi Film Production
- Distributed by: Memento Films Distribution (France)
- Release date: 12 May 2018 (Cannes)
- Running time: 100 minutes
- Country: Iran
- Languages: Persian; Azerbaijani

3 Faces (Persian: Se rokh – سه رخ, French: Trois visages) is a 2018 Iranian drama film directed by Jafar Panahi and starring Behnaz Jafari and Panahi as themselves. The film was produced despite a ban on filmmaking imposed on Panahi. It was selected to compete for the Palme d'Or at the 2018 Cannes Film Festival, winning the award for Best Screenplay.

== Plot ==
Behnaz Jafari, a popular Iranian actress, searches for a young girl (Marziyeh) in northwestern Iran with her friend Jafar Panahi, a director, after seeing a video of the girl asking for help to leave her conservative family.

The film takes the form of a road movie, much of it taking place in and around Panahi's SUV. Several whimsical encounters take place on the trip, with local characters and traditions. Marziyeh, ostracised from the village, is eventually discovered living with another older woman, Shahrzad, who lives as a recluse. Shahzad, like Jafari, was a famous real-life Iranian actress; she was ostracised after the Iranian Revolution, following years of mistreatment by male directors.

== Cast ==
- Behnaz Jafari as herself
- Jafar Panahi as himself
- Marziyeh Rezaei credited as Marziyeh
- Maedeh Erteghaei
- Narges Del Aram

== Production ==
3 Faces was Jafar Panahi's fourth film made under his 20-year filmmaking ban imposed by the government of Iran, after This Is Not a Film, Closed Curtain, and Taxi. It is filmed in a remote Turkish (Azerbaijani) speaking part of Iran where Panahi's parents hail from.

Of necessity the filming is often 'rough and ready', including an opening sequence filmed using a hand held mobile phone.

== Reception ==
=== Critical response ===
3 Faces has an approval rating of 98% on review aggregator website Rotten Tomatoes, based on 102 reviews, and an average rating of 7.9/10. The website's critical consensus states: "Observational, insightful, and ultimately powerful, 3 Faces adds another quietly thought-provoking chapter to writer-director Jafar Panahi's filmography". Metacritic assigned the film a weighted average score of 78 out of 100, based on 18 critics, indicating generally favourable reviews.

Variety describes the film as an "absorbing paradox", where Panahi shifts the emphasis onto "a whole underclass of Iranian womanhood" in "what feels like his freest film" and "most elusive" since his film-making ban. The review says the film is a "quietly fierce act of cinematic defiance."

The Los Angeles Times described the film as a "multi-generational portrait" with "its quotidian poetry, its deep reserves of mystery and its rich rewards for an open-hearted audience".

== Awards and recognition ==
The film was selected to compete for the Palme d'Or at the 2018 Cannes Film Festival. At Cannes, Panahi and co-writer Nader Saeivar won the award for Best Screenplay.

The film also won the Golden Orange at the Antalya Golden Orange Film Festival, the Douglas Sirk Award at the Hamburg Film Festival, and the Leon Cakoff Prize at the São Paulo International Film Festival
