= The Mirror (1997 film) =

- Directed by: Jafar Panahi
- Written by: Jafar Panahi
- Produced by: Jafar Panahi; Vahid Nikkhah Azad
- Starring: Mina Mohammad Khani
- Cinematography: Farzad Jadat
- Edited by: Jafar Panahi
- Release date: 1997
- Running time: 95 minutes
- Country: Iran
- Language: Persian

The Mirror (Persian: آینه Ayneh) is a 1997 Iranian film directed by Jafar Panahi, about a little girl trying to find her way home from school.

== Plot ==
Mina, a first-grader, finds her mother has failed to pick her up from school. The movie is about her endeavor to find her way home amidst the noise, confusion and chaos of Tehran. Mina is dressed in school uniform (with a head scarf), has one arm in a cast and is holding a school bag in the other. She meets a lot of people on her way and most of them try to help her while others are surprisingly apathetic to her situation. Eventually, the movie takes a turn when the girl looks into the camera for the first time, breaking the fourth wall, and someone shouts from off-screen, "Mina, don't look into the camera!" The movie is a real-life capture of events thereon (or that is how it seems). Mina announces that she doesn't want to act in the movie any more and wants to go home. In the end she goes home after returning the microphone.

== Meaning ==
In a 2006 interview, Panahi said that the film was meant to show how "reality and the imagination are intertwined, they are very similar". Also he mentioned about how the film is staged in a way which normally nobody would suspect was drama but would instead believe was real.

== Cast ==
- Mina Mohammad Khani as Mina
- Kazem Mojdehi
- Naser Omuni
- M. Shirzad
- T. Samadpour

== Reception ==
=== Critical response ===
The Mirror has an approval rating of 100% on review aggregator website Rotten Tomatoes, based on 7 reviews, and an average rating of 8/10.

=== Accolades ===
Award	Category	Winner/Nominee	Result
Locarno International Film Festival	Golden Leopard	Jafar Panahi	Won
Istanbul International Film Festival	Golden Tulip	Jafar Panahi	Won
Singapore International Film Festival	Silver Screen Award (Best Asian Director)	Jafar Panahi	Won
Valladolid International Film Festival	Golden Spike	Jafar Panahi	Nominated
