= Mojtaba Mirtahmasb =

Iranian filmmaker and film producer (born 1971)

مجتبی میرطهماسب Mojtaba Mirtahmasb
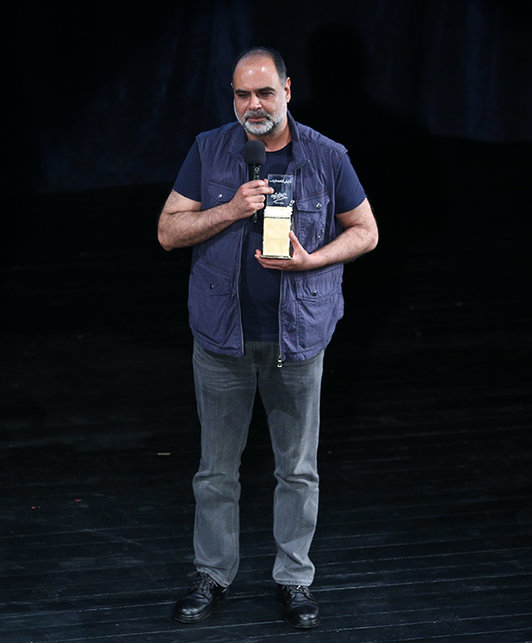
- Born: 1971 (age 54–55); Kerman, Iran
- Education: University of Art Mojtame’-e Daneshgahiyeh Honar
- Occupations: Film director, producer
- Years active: 1992 – present
- Known for: This Is Not a Film
- Children: Yasna Mirtahmasb

Mojtaba Mirtahmasb (Persian: مجتبی میرطهماسب; born in 1971) is an Iranian filmmaker and film producer. He co-directed This Is Not a Film (2011) with Jafar Panahi.

== Life ==
Mirtahmasb was born in Kerman, Iran in 1971. From 1992 until 1995 he attended the University of Art “Mojtame’-e Daneshgahiyeh Honar" in Tehran, studying visual art and handicrafts. At school he was primarily interested in Shiite rituals and ceremonies, but also studied photography and filmmaking.

After graduating Mirtahmasb directed nine documentaries for the Islamic Art and Material Culture of Iranian Shiism in 1996 and 1997. The subjects of these films included calico making, the art of glazing, enamel work, Islamic tile work, and Islamic needlework. During this period he also directed three short videos during his military service called The Story of Khoramshahr, Motherland, and Stars. He has worked with Iranian film directors Kambozia Partovi, Mohsen Makhmalbaf and Afghan filmmaker Siddiq Barmak.

In the Fall of 2011 Mirtahmasb and five other Iranian filmmakers were arrested by Iranian authorities for their participation in the BBC Persian's documentary on Supreme Leader Ali Khamenei. The Iranian Intelligence Minister accused the six filmmakers of "anti-national missions for the British Intelligence service's centre for psychological and secret operations, also known as the BBC." He was released in December 2011. In December 2012 This Is Not a Film was shortlisted as one of 15 films eligible for Best Documentary Feature at the 85th Academy Awards.

== Selected filmography ==
Director

- 1997 The Story of Khoramshahr
- 1997 Motherland
- 1997 Stars
- 2008 Lady of the Roses
- 2011 This Is Not a Film

Other work

- 1996 Gabbeh (sound department)
- 2000 Blackboards (assistant director)
- 2000 The Day I Became a Woman (assistant director)
- 2000 How Samira Made the Blackboards (documentary) (sound)
- 2001 Kandahar (assistant director)
- 2003 Two Angels (assistant director)
- 2003 Milkan (sound)
- 2006 Children of the Prophet (line producer)
- 2008 Lady of the Roses (producer)
- 2010 Im Bazar der Geschlechter (line producer)

== See also ==
- Persian cinema
