= Mostafa Aleahmad =

Iranian filmmaker and screenwriter

- مصطفی آل احمد
- Born: August 23, 1970 (age 55); Tehran, Iran
- Occupations: Film director, screenwriter, production designer, costume designer, painter
- Years active: 1991–present
- Notable work: Pooste (The Shell)

Mostafa Aleahmad (Persian: مصطفی آل احمد; born 23 August 1970) is an Iranian filmmaker, screenwriter, and painter. He was arrested on 8 July 2022 after signing a statement known as the "Put Down Your Gun" declaration.

== Life and career ==
Aleahmad was born on 23 August 1970 in Tehran. He studied painting and performing arts and began working in Iranian cinema during the 1990s as a production and costume designer. He has directed several short films, animations, and documentaries that have been screened at international festivals such as Montreal, Busan, Tokyo, Nyon, Tampere, and Montecatini.

His works have received various awards including the UNICA Medal, the Ebenz Silver Medal, and the Best Experimental Film Award at the Festival of Nations in Austria. He wrote, directed, and designed the feature film Pooste (The Shell).

In addition to his film career, Aleahmad is also a painter. His visual art remains less widely known. In 1997, he published the book Surrealism: The Concept of Artistic Aesthetics, introducing a theoretical framework on artistic beauty. He has collaborated with German and Finnish television networks on several art projects.

== Arrest over the “Put Down Your Gun” statement ==
On 8 July 2022, Aleahmad was detained along with other Iranian filmmakers after signing a public statement calling on security forces to refrain from violence against civilians during protests.

=== Reactions ===
His arrest prompted criticism from Iranian and international artists, cultural organizations, and human rights groups. The Iranian House of Cinema and several global film associations issued statements demanding his release. Aleahmad was later released on bail after several weeks in detention.

== Filmography ==
- The Shell (Pooste) – Feature film (Writer, Director, Designer)
- Multiple short films, documentaries, and animations presented at international festivals

== Publications ==
- Surrealism: The Concept of Artistic Aesthetics (1997)

== See also ==
- Cinema of Iran
- List of Iranian film directors
