= Crimson Gold =

- DVD cover
- Persian: طلای سرخ
- Directed by: Jafar Panahi
- Written by: Abbas Kiarostami
- Produced by: Jafar Panahi
- Starring: Hossain Emadeddin; Kamyar Sheisi; Azita Rayeji; Shahram Vaziri; Ehsan Amani; Pourang Nakhael; Koveh Najmabadi; Saber Safael
- Cinematography: Hossein Jafarian
- Music by: Peyman Yazdanian
- Release date: May 24, 2003 (Cannes Film Festival)
- Running time: 95 minutes
- Country: Iran
- Language: Persian

Crimson Gold (Persian: طلای سرخ, romanized: Talâ-ye Sorx) is a 2003 Iranian drama film directed by Jafar Panahi, and written by Abbas Kiarostami. The film stars Hossein Emadeddin as a pizza delivery man who witnesses corruption and class disparity in his city and is driven to crime.

The film was never distributed in Iranian theatres, because it was considered too "dark". Therefore, it was not possible that Crimson Gold be considered as the Iranian entry for Best Foreign Language Film for the 2003 Oscars as it was not released in Iran.

== Plot ==
Mentally ill pizza delivery man Hossein attempts to rob a jewelry store with his friend and co-worker Ali. The jeweler refuses to cooperate and triggers the alarm of the store. Hossein kills the jeweler and, after some deliberation, takes his own life.

Days before his death, Hossein is told by Ali that everything is cleared for his marriage to Ali's sister. Ali empties a purse he had snatched, where they find a slip of paper with the address of a jewelry store and a figure of 75 million tomans. A con artist overhears the conversation and informs them on pickpocketing. Hossein, naturally sensitive to his social status, is offended by the con artist's automatic classification of him and Ali as mere pickpockets. Later on, Hossein and Ali attempt to visit the jeweler's shop but are prevented from entering.

One night, Hossein makes a delivery first to a former comrade in arms who gives him a large tip, and then to a raucous block party in a wealthy Tehran district that is being staked out by the police. The police prevent his delivery and detain him until the party ends. He offers the pizza instead to the police, who only eat when the chief accepts a slice.

The next morning, Hossein, Ali, and Ali's sister dress formally and gain admittance to the jewelry store. They browse among jewelry much too expensive for their means, while Hossein primarily waits to see the jeweler. When the jeweler actually shows up, he condescendingly suggests that they go to a pawnshop to buy handcrafted gold that can be easily liquidated in an emergency. Disgusted, Hossein and Ali's sister leave to their respective homes.

Hossein naps in his simple apartment until he is awakened by police arresting a man professing innocence from a nearby building. Later that night, he passes by the scene of a serious accident involving a fellow delivery driver. He delivers a pizza to a rich and self-absorbed man named Pourang, who lives in a lavish apartment. Pourang invites him in, and while he is occupied in a phone call, Hossein explores the apartment, taking a shave and swimming in the pool, before surveying the city from its balcony.

Some time later, Hossein holds the jeweler at gunpoint when the latter opens the shop. He demands a blue ring that caught his eye during his last visit, and then access to the safe when told that the ring is in it. The scene ends before the robbery goes south and Hossein commits suicide.

== Cast ==
- Hossein Emadeddin as Hossein
- Kamyar Sheisi as Ali
- Azita Rayeji as The Bride, Ali's sister
- Shahram Vaziri as The Jeweler
- Ehsan Amani as The Man in the Tea House, a con artist
- Pourang Nakhael as The Rich Man
- Kaveh Najmabadi as The Seller
- Saber Safael as The Soldier

== Production ==
Hossein Emadeddin, who plays the lead role, was not a professional actor but an actual pizza delivery man with paranoid schizophrenia, who made filming very difficult by destructiveness and noncooperation. After completion, the Iranian Ministry of Guidance insisted that cuts be made to the film, which Panahi refused, leading to the film being banned in Iran, even for private screenings.

== Reception ==
=== Critical response ===
Crimson Gold has an approval rating of 88% on review aggregator website Rotten Tomatoes, based on 83 reviews, and an average rating of 7.5/10. The website's critical consensus states: "A slow-burning, riveting film about Iranian class differences". Metacritic assigned the film a weighted average score of 81 out of 100, based on 26 critics, indicating "universal acclaim".

=== Awards ===
- Cannes Film Festival, Un Certain Regard Jury Award.
- Chicago International Film Festival, Gold Hugo.
- Tbilisi International Film Festival, Golden Prometheus.
- Valladolid International Film Festival, Golden Spike (Tied with Osama).
