= The Year of the Everlasting Storm =

2021 film

- Official poster
- Directed by: Jafar Panahi; Anthony Chen; Malik Vitthal; Laura Poitras; Dominga Sotomayor; David Lowery; Apichatpong Weerasethakul
- Produced by: Brad Becker-Parton; Andrea Roa; Jeff Deutchman
- Music by: Raman Dlamani; Brian Eno; Flying Lotus; Darren N.J.; Shahram Shafi
- Production companies: Neon; Animal Kingdom
- Distributed by: Neon
- Release dates: July 14, 2021 (Cannes); September 3, 2021 (United States)
- Running time: 115 minutes
- Country: United States
- Language: English
- Box office: $12,245

The Year of the Everlasting Storm is a 2021 American anthology film featuring segments directed by Jafar Panahi, Anthony Chen, Malik Vitthal, Laura Poitras, Dominga Sotomayor, David Lowery and Apichatpong Weerasethakul.

The film had its world premiere at the Cannes Film Festival on July 14, 2021. It was released on September 3, 2021, by Neon.

== Plot ==
Segment	Country	Director / Writer	Description	Actors/Subjects
Life	Iran	Jafar Panahi	A documentary of Panahi's family's early life during quarantine.	Jafar Panahi, Tahereh Saidi Balsini
The Break Away	China	Anthony Chen	A young married couple struggle with looking after their young son during lockdown.	Zhou Dongyu, Zhang Yu
Little Measures	United States	Malik Vitthal	A documentary on Bobby Yay Yay Jones and his attempt to reunite with his three children, each in separate foster homes.	Bobby Yay Yay Jones, Yay'Veontay Jones, Bobby Levi Jones, Imani Jones
Terror Contagion	United States	Laura Poitras	A documentary on Poitras' and the investigative journalist group Forensic Architecture's investigation into the Pegasus spyware.	Laura Poitras, Forensic Architecture
Sin Titulo, 2020	Chile	Dominga Sotomayor	A woman and her grown daughter attempt to break quarantine in order to see her other daughter's newborn child.	Francisca Castillo, Rosa García-Huidobro
Dig Up My Darling	United States	David Lowery	A woman finds a box of letters in a storage unit and follows their directions to an unmarked grave.	Catherine Machovsky
Night Colonies	Thailand	Apichatpong Weerasethakul	A filmed installation of an empty bed in a room full of insects.	

== Production ==
In May 2021, it was announced Jafar Panahi, Anthony Chen, Malik Vitthal, Laura Poitras, Dominga Sotomayor, David Lowery and Apichatpong Weerasethakul had directed an anthology film, with Neon producing and distributing.

== Release ==
The film had its world premiere at the Cannes Film Festival on July 14, 2021, and was released on September 3, 2021.

== Reception ==
The Year of the Everlasting Storm holds a 94% approval rating on review aggregator website Rotten Tomatoes, based on 31 reviews, with a weighted average of 7.40/10. The site's consensus states: "The Year of the Everlasting Storm presents a diverse assortment of filmmakers offering a varied yet compelling response to shared trauma".
