= This Is Not a Film =

- Theatrical release poster
- Directed by: Jafar Panahi; Mojtaba Mirtahmasb
- Produced by: Jafar Panahi
- Starring: Jafar Panahi; Mojtaba Mirtahmasb
- Cinematography: Jafar Panahi; Mojtaba Mirtahmasb
- Edited by: Jafar Panahi
- Distributed by: Kanibal Films Distribution (France)
- Release date: May 20, 2011 (Cannes)
- Running time: 76 minutes
- Country: Iran
- Language: Persian

This Is Not a Film (Persian: In film nist - این فیلم نیست) is an Iranian documentary film by Jafar Panahi and Mojtaba Mirtahmasb. It was released on 28 September 2011 in France, distributed by Kanibal Films Distribution.

The film was smuggled from Iran to Cannes on a flash drive. (Note: A hoax exists regarding the USB drive being put inside of a cake during the smuggling. Panahi has confirmed this to be false.) It was specially screened at the 2011 Cannes Film Festival and later at the New York Film Festival, and others. It also took part in the International Competition of the 27th Warsaw International Film Festival.

The documentary was made while Panahi was under house arrest, waiting to hear the results of his appeal of a 6-year prison sentence and a 20-year ban on all further filmmaking — strictures imposed in retaliation for his open support of the opposition party in Iran's 2009 elections. His appeal was rejected, but the prison sentence was not enforced and Panahi continued to make films in secret under difficult conditions. In July of 2022 authorities chose to reimpose his six-year prison sentence after Panahi's inquiries about the arrests of Mohammad Rasoulof and another filmmaker, Mostafa Al-Ahmad. However, he was released on February 3rd, 2023 just two days after going on a hunger strike to protest his imprisonment.

== Synopsis ==
Partly shot on an iPhone, this documentary depicts Panahi's day-to-day life while under house arrest in his apartment. He talks to his family and lawyer (he is appealing his sentence) and reflects on the meaning of filmmaking.

== Reception ==
This Is Not a Film has an approval rating of 97% on review aggregator website Rotten Tomatoes, based on 103 reviews, and an average rating of 8.9/10. The website's critical consensus states: "Through simple means and filming, This is Not a Film presents a vital political statement and a snapshot of life in Iran as enemy of the state." Metacritic assigned the film a weighted average score of 90 out of 100, based on 27 critics, indicating "universal acclaim".

Keith Uhlich of Time Out New York named This Is Not A Film the sixth-best film of 2012, calling it an "extraordinarily egoless self-profile" and "protest art at its peak." Sight & Sound placed it eighth on its list of the best films of 2012. Calling This Is Not A Film one of the top 10 movies of 2012, critic Ann Hornaday of The Washington Post said it "uses Brechtian staging, blurred lines between documentary and drama, and an iPhone to explore the notion of physical and political boundaries, the aesthetic and technological contours of cinema, and the enduring power of self-expression." Critic A. O. Scott of The New York Times rated This Is Not a Film the fourth best documentary of 2012, calling it a "brave and witty video diary, an essay on the struggle between political tyranny and the creative imagination." Peter Debruge of Variety called the film "a courageous act of nonviolent protest." Deborah Young of The Hollywood Reporter called it "an unusual documentary" that finds a creative solution to Panahi's ban on filmmaking. Jacques Mandelbaum of Le Monde wrote that the film shows audiences Panahi's courage and dignity. In December 2012, it was shortlisted as one of 15 films eligible for Best Documentary Feature at the 85th Academy Awards.
