= 57th Venice International Film Festival =

Italian film festival in 2000

- Festival poster
- Opening film: Space Cowboys
- Closing film: Vengo
- Location: Venice, Italy
- Founded: 1932
- Awards: Golden Lion: The Circle
- Hosted by: Chiara Caselli
- Artistic director: Alberto Barbera
- Festival date: 30 August – 9 September 2000
- Website: Website

Venice Film Festival chronology
- 58th 56th

The 57th annual Venice International Film Festival was held between 30 August to 9 September 2000.

Czech filmmaker Miloš Forman was the Jury President of the main competition.

The Golden Lion was awarded to the Iranian film The Circle, directed by Jafar Panahi. American filmmaker and actor Clint Eastwood was the recipient of the Golden Lion for Lifetime Achievement.

== Jury ==
The following people comprised the 2000 jury:

=== Main Competition ===
- Miloš Forman, Czech filmmaker - Jury President
- Tahar Ben Jelloun, Moroccan writer
- Giuseppe Bertolucci, Italian director
- Claude Chabrol, French filmmaker
- Andreas Kilb, Italian film critic
- Jennifer Jason Leigh, American actress
- Samira Makhmalbaf, Iranian filmmaker

=== Luigi De Laurentiis Award for a Debut Feature ===
- Atom Egoyan, Armenian-Canadian director - Jury President
- Mimmo Calopresti, Italian director
- Bill Krohn, American critic
- Chiara Mastroianni, French actress
- Peter Mullan, Scottish actor and director

=== Short Films Competition ===
- Georges Bollon, French founder of the Clermont-Ferrand Short Film Festival
- Giuseppe Piccioni, Italian director
- Nina Proll, Austrian actress

== Official Sections ==
=== In Competition ===
| English title | Original title | Director(s) | Production country |
|---|---|---|---|
| Before Night Falls | | Julian Schnabel | United States |
| The Circle | دایره | Jafar Panahi | Iran, Italy, Switzerland |
| Comedy of Innocence | Comédie de l'innocence | Raoul Ruiz | France |
| Teeth | Denti | Gabriele Salvatores | Italy |
| Dr. T & the Women | | Robert Altman | United States, Germany |
| Durian Durian | 榴槤飄飄 | Fruit Chan | Hong Kong |
| The Phantom / The Ghost | O Fantasma | João Pedro Rodrigues | Portugal |
| Freedom | Laisvė | Sharunas Bartas | Lithuania, France, Portugal |
| The Goddess of 1967 | | Clara Law | Australia |
| Holy Tongue | La lingua del santo | Carlo Mazzacurati | Italy |
| The Isle | 섬 | Ki-duk Kim | South Korea |
| Johnny the Partisan | Il partigiano Johnny | Guido Chiesa | Italy |
| Liam | | Stephen Frears | United States, United Kingdom, Germany, Italy, France |
| The Man Who Cried | | Sally Potter | United Kingdom, France |
| One Hundred Steps | I cento passi | Marco Tullio Giordana | Italy |
| Our Lady of the Assassins | La virgen de los sicarios | Barbet Schroeder | Colombia, Spain, France |
| Platform | 站台 | Jia Zhangke | China |
| To Matthieu | Selon Matthieu | Xavier Beauvois | France |
| Uttara | উত্তরা | Buddhadev Dasgupta | India |
| Word and Utopia | Palavra e Utopia | Manoel de Oliveira | Portugal |

=== Out of Competition ===
The following films were screened out of competition:

| English title | Original title | Director(s) | Production country |
|---|---|---|---|
| Brother | ブラザー | Takeshi Kitano | Japan, France, United States, United Kingdom |
| Calle 54 | | Fernando Trueba | Spain |
| My Voyage to Italy | Il mio viaggio in Italia | Martin Scorsese | Italy, United States |
| Nightcap | Merci pour le Chocolat | Claude Chabrol | France |
| Small Time Crooks | | Woody Allen | United States |
| Space Cowboys | | Clint Eastwood | United States |
| Vengo | | Tony Gatlif | France, Spain, Germany, Japan |

=== Cinema del Presente ===
An official selection of films that stand out for their "attempt at innovation, originality or innovative film style".

| English title | Original title | Director(s) | Production country |
|---|---|---|---|
| Adanggaman | | Roger Gnoan M'Bala | Ivory Coast, Burkina Faso, Switzerland, Italy, France |
| Animali che attraversano la strada | | Isabella Sandri | Italy |
| Clint Eastwood: Out of the Shadows | | Bruce Ricker | United States |
| Everybody's Famous! | Iedereen Beroemd! | Dominique Deruddere | Belgium |
| Last Resort | | Paweł Pawlikowski | United Kingdom |
| Memento | | Christopher Nolan | United States |
| Moscow | Moskva | Alexander Zeldovich | Russia |
| My Generation | | Barbara Kopple | United States |
| Little Otik | Otesánek | Jan Svankmajer | Czech Republic, United Kingdom |
| Placido Rizzotto | | Pasquale Scimeca | Italy |
| Pollock | | Ed Harris | United States |
| Possible Worlds | | Robert Lepage | Canada |
| Roman Summer | Estate romana | Matteo Garrone | Italy |
| Samia | | Philippe Faucon | France |
| Suspicious River | | Lynne Stopkewich | Canada |
| The Prime Gig | | Gregory Mosher | United States |
| The State I Am In | Die Innere Sicherheit | Christian Petzold | Germany |
| The Town Is Quiet | La ville est tranquille | Robert Guédiguian | France |
| Thomas in Love | Thomas est amoureux | Pierre-Paul Renders | Belgium, France |
| Together | Tillsammans | Lukas Moodysson | Sweden, Denmark, Italy |
| Waiting for the Messiah | Esperando al Mesías | Daniel Burman | Argentina |

=== Dreams and Visions ===
The following films were selected for the section "Dreams and Visions" ('Sogni e Visioni'):

| English title | Original title | Director(s) | Production country |
|---|---|---|---|
| Burnt Money | Plata quemada | Marcelo Piñeyro | Argentina |
| The Cell | | Tarsem Singh | United States |
| The Princess and the Warrior | Der Krieger und die Kaiserin | Tom Tykwer | Germany |
| Sade | | Benoît Jacquot | France |
| Sud Side Stori | | Roberta Torre | Italy |
| Time and Tide | Shun Liu Ni Liu | Tsui Hark | Hong Kong |
| U-571 | | Jonathan Mostow | United States, France |
| What Lies Beneath | | Robert Zemeckis | United States |

=== New Territories ===
The following films were selected for the section "New Territories" ('Nuovi Territori'):

| English title | Original title | Director(s) | Production country |
|---|---|---|---|
| Branca de Neve | | João César Monteiro | Portugal |
| Endgame | | Conor McPherson | United Kingdom |
| Tales of an Island | Dastan Hay-e Jazireh | Dariush Mehrjui, Mohsen Makhmalbaf, Shahabodin Farokh Yar | Iran |
| Fare la vita | | Tonino De Bernardi | Italy |
| Happy Days | | Patricia Rozema | Ireland |
| Invocación | | Héctor Faver | Spain |
| MacBeth sangrador | | Leonardo Henríquez | Venezuela |
| Mones com la Becky | | Joaquím Jordá, Núria Villazán | Spain |
| O Rap do Pequeno Príncipe Contra as Almas Sebosas | | Paulo Caldas, Marcelo Luna | Brasil |
| Pie in the Sky: The Brigid Berlin Story | | Shelly Dunn Fremont, Vincent Fremont | United States |
| The Young and the Dead | | Shari Springer Berman, Robert Pulcini | United States |
| Une Vie de Chiens | | Michko Netchak | France |
Non-fiction
| Currency and Blonde | | Rokuro Mochizuki | Japan |
| Die Wahlkämpferin | | Helmut Grasser | Austria |
| Oshima'99 | | Naoe Gozu | Japan |

== Independent Sections ==
=== Venice International Film Critics' Week ===
The following feature films were selected to be screened as In Competition for this section:

| English title | Original title | Director(s) | Production country |
|---|---|---|---|
| Merry Christmas | Felicidades | Lucho Bender | Argentina |
| Poetical Refugee | La Faute à Voltaire | Abdellatif Kechiche | France |
| Pictures Deep in One's Eyes | Lontano in fondo agli occhi | Giuseppe Rocca | Italy |
| Nights | Noites | Cláudia Tomaz | Portugal |
| The Day I Became a Woman | Roozi ke zan shodam | Marzieh Meshkini | Iran |
| Scoutman | Pain | Masato Ishioka | Japan |
| You Can Count on Me | | Kenneth Lonergan | United States |

== Official Awards ==
=== Main Competition ===
- Golden Lion: The Circle by Jafar Panahi
- Grand Special Jury Prize: Before Night Falls by Julian Schnabel
- Silver Lion: Uttara by Buddhadev Dasgupta
- Golden Osella for Outstanding Technical Contribution (screenplay): Claudio Fava, Marco Tullio Giordana and Monica Zapelli for One Hundred Steps
- Volpi Cup for Best Actor: Javier Bardem for Before Night Falls
- Volpi Cup for Best Actress: Rose Byrne for The Goddess of 1967
- Special Mention Best Short Film: Faouzi Bensaïdi for The Rain Line
- Special Mention Best Short Film: Sandro Aguilar for Sem Movimento
- Marcello Mastroianni Award: Megan Burns for Liam

=== Luigi De Laurentis Award for Debut Feature ===
- Poetical Refugee by Abdellatif Kechiche

=== Golden Lion for Lifetime Achievement ===
- Clint Eastwood

== Independent Awards ==
=== The President of the Italian Senate's Gold Medal ===
- Our Lady of the Assassin by Barbet Schroeder

=== FIPRESCI Prize ===
- Best First Feature: Thomas in Love by Pierre-Paul Renders
- Best Feature: The Circle by Jafar Panahi

=== OCIC Award ===
- Liam by Stephen Frears
  - Honorable Mention: Before Night Falls by Julian Schnabel
  - Honorable Mention: The Circle by Jafar Panahi

=== Netpac Award ===
- Platform by Jia Zhangke
  - Special Mention: Seom by Ki-duk Kim

=== Don Quixote Award ===
- Protagonisti, i diritti del '900 by Daniele Segre

=== UNICEF Award ===
- The Circle by Jafar Panahi

=== UNESCO Award ===
- The Day i Became a Woman by Marzieh Meshkini

=== Pasinetti Award ===
- Best Film: I cento passi by Marco Tullio Giordana
- Best Actor: Antonio Albanese and Fabrizio Bentivoglio for Holy Tongue
- Best Actress: Fereshteh Sadre Orafaee, Fatemeh Naghavi, Nargess Mamizadeh, Maryiam Palvin Almani, Mojgan Faramarzi, Elham Saboktakin, Monir Arab, Maedeh Tahmasebi, Maryam Shayegan, Khadijeh Moradi, Negar Ghadyani and Solmaz Panahi for The Circle

=== Pietro Bianchi Award ===
- Gillo Pontecorvo

=== Isvema Award ===
- The Day i Became a Woman by Marzieh Meshkini

=== FEDIC Award ===
- Placido Rizzotto by Pasquale Scimeca

=== Little Golden Lion ===
- I cento passi by Marco Tullio Giordana

=== Cult Network Italia Prize ===
- Noites by Cláudia Tomaz

=== FilmCritica "Bastone Bianco" Award ===
- Word and Utopia by Manoel de Oliveira

=== Future Film Festival Digital Award ===
- Time and Tide by Tsui Hark
  - Special Mention: Denti by Gabriele Salvatores

=== Laterna Magica Prize ===
- Thomas in Love by Pierre-Paul Renders

=== Sergio Trasatti Award ===
- The Circle by Jafar Panahi

=== CinemAvvenire Award ===
- Best Film on the Relationship Man-Nature: Freedom by Šarūnas Bartas
- Best Film: I cento passi by Marco Tullio Giordana
- Best First Film: Roozi ke zan shodam by Marzieh Meshkini
- Cinema for Peace Award: Poetical Refugee by Abdellatif Kechiche

=== Children and Cinema Award ===
- Johnny the Partisan by Guido Chiesa

=== Rota Soundtrack Award ===
- Before Night Falls by Carter Burwell

=== Special Director's Award ===
- The Wrestlers by Buddhadeb Dasgupta
