= Sahar Goldoost =

Iranian actress (born 1986)

- Born: October 9, 1986 (age 39); Shiraz, Fars, Iran
- Occupation: Actress
- Years active: 2016–present

Sahar Goldoost (Persian: سحر گلدوست; born October 9, 1986) is an Iranian actress. She gained recognition for her debut role in Academy Award-winning director Asghar Farhadi's A Hero (2021). Goldoost received two Hafez Award nominations for her performances in A Hero and the drama miniseries At the End of the Night (2024).

== Early life ==
Sahar Goldoost was born on October 9, 1986, in Shiraz, Fars, Iran.

== Filmography ==
=== Film ===
Year	Title	Role	Director	Notes	Ref(s)
2021	A Hero	Farkhondeh	Asghar Farhadi		
2025	Woman and Child	Aliyar's aunt	Saeed Roustaee		

=== Web ===
Year	Title	Role	Director	Platform	Notes	Ref(s)
2024	At the End of the Night	Soraya	Ida Panahandeh	Filmnet	Main role	
2026	The Red and the Black		Ida Panahandeh	Filimo	Main role	

== Awards and nominations ==
Name of the award ceremony, year presented, category, nominee of the award, and the result of the nomination
Award	Year	Category	Nominated work	Result	Ref(s)
Hafez Awards	2021	Best Actress – Motion Picture	A Hero	Nominated	
Hafez Awards	2024	Best Actress – Television Series Drama	At the End of the Night	Nominated	
