= Border Cafe =

Border Cafe may refer to:

- Border Cafe (film), a 1937 film
- Border Cafe (TV series), a British TV series
- Café Transit a 2005 film directed by Kambuzia Partoviaka, also known as Border Café
