= Naghavi =

Naghavi is a family name. It may refer to:

- Fatemeh Naghavi, an Iranian actress
- Hossein Naghavi-Hosseini, an Iranian politician
- Steve Naghavi, co-founder of German band And One
