= Lee Fung =

Lee Fung or Li Fung may refer to:

- Cecelia Lee Fung-Sing (born 1933), a Hong Kong actress and Cantonese opera singer sometimes credited as Li Fung or Lee Fung
- Lee Mei Fung (born 1963), a Hong Kong actress known professionally as Elizabeth Lee
- Lee Sun-fung (1909-1985), a Hong Kong film director, writer, and actor
- Lee Fung (born 1953), a Hong Kong actress with over 70 credits
- Li & Fung Limited, a Hong Kong-based supply chain management company
