= Cecelia Lee Fung-Sing =

Chinese actress and Cantonese opera singer

- Chinese: 李鳳聲
- Born: May 6, 1933 (age 93)
- Other names: Cecelia Lee, Cecilia Lee, Cecilia Lee Fung-sing, Fung-Sing Lee, Lee Heung-Ying, Lee Fong-Sing
- Occupations: Actress; Cantonese opera singer
- Years active: 1953–1966, 1996
- Known for: Cross-dressed in male role in Cantonese opera, Founder of Lee Yuen Chinese Opera
- Spouse: Fung Chi-Kong

Cecelia Lee Fung-Sing (Chinese: 李鳳聲; born May 6, 1933) is a Chinese actress and Cantonese opera singer from Hong Kong. Lee is known for cross-dressed in male role in Cantonese opera films. Lee is credited with over 55 films.

== Early life ==
On May 6, 1933, Lee was born.

== Education ==
For Cantonese opera, Lee was mentored by Lee Bo-lun. Lee trained in martial arts from masters Simon Yuen Siu-tin, Qi Yukun, Han Yingjie and Kwan Ching-leung. Lee trained in vocal from Wong To and Lau Siu-wing.

== Career ==
In 1953, Lee became an actress in Hong Kong films. Lee first appeared as Sixth Aunt in The Valiant Dog, a 1953 Drama film directed by Wong Toi. Her Xue Baochai, credited as Lee Heung-Ying, in two 1954 films the Grand View Garden (Part 1 and Part 2) when she was opposite Yim Fun Fong, the Lin Daiyu, in contemporary settings instead of usual opera costumes. Lee first appeared in Cantonese opera related film in An Actor's Struggle with Yam Kim-fai, a 1955 Cantonese opera film directed by Fung Chi-Kong. In 1962, Lee also became a producer for 8 Roaming Heroines (Part 1 and Part 2). Lee is known for appearing in male role in some Cantonese opera films. Lee cross-dressed and appeared as King Yan of Song in Trouble in the Palace (a.k.a. Sister Yeung), a 1963 Cantonese opera film directed by Chan Cheuk-Sang. In this film, Lee also performed leg-swirling somersault. Lee cross-dressed and appeared as Jin general Fu Siu-Fung in The Hero's Tears (a.k.a. Operation Woods), a 1964 Cantonese opera film directed by Chan Cheuk-Sang. Lee also cross-dressed and appeared as Prince Kam Lun in The Ambitious Prince, a 1965 Cantonese opera film directed by Wong Fung. In 1966. Lee co-founded a Cantonese opera troupe. In Lee's last Hong Kong film, she cross-dressed and appeared as king of Wei, Cho Sai-cheong, in The Plot (a.k.a. Teaching the Son to Slay the Emperor, Revenge of the Prince), a 1967 Historical Drama film directed by Wong Hok-Sing. In 1996, Lee founded Lee Yuen Chinese Opera in Australia. In Australia. Lee appeared in Floating Life, a 1996 film directed by Clara Law Cheuk-Yiu. Lee is credited with over 55 films.

== Filmography ==
=== Films ===
This is a partial list of films.

- 1953 The Valiant Dog – Sixth Aunt
- 1955 An Actor's Struggle
- 1961 Leung Hung Yuk's Victory at Wong Tin Tong
- 1962 8 Roaming Heroines (Part 1 and Part 2) (a.k.a. Eight Roaming Heroines, Eight Errant Ladies) – also as Producer
- 1963 The Fake Lover (a.k.a. A Funny Match) – Young man
- 1963 Trouble in the Palace (a.k.a. Sister Yeung) – King Yan of Song
- 1964 The Hero's Tears (a.k.a. Operation Woods) – Fu Siu-Fung, a Jin general
- 1964 The 9 Phoenixes of the City (a.k.a. Nine Phoenixes of Hong Kong, The Nine Ladies of Fragrant City) – Bullying mobster (male role)
- 1965 The Ambitious Prince – Prince Kam Lun
- 1967 The Plot (a.k.a. Teaching the Son to Slay the Emperor, Revenge of the Prince) – Cho Sai-cheong, king of Wei
- 1996 Floating Life – Mrs. Chan, Won Golden Horse Award for Best Supporting Actress

== Awards ==
- 1996 Golden Horse Awards – Best Supporting Actress for Floating Life

== Personal life ==
Lee's husband is Fung Chi-Kong, a film director. In 1991, Lee moved to Sydney, Australia.
