= Nahid (film) =

2015 film

- Film poster
- Directed by: Ida Panahandeh
- Written by: Ida Panahandeh; Arsalan Amiri
- Starring: Sareh Bayat; Pejman Bazeghi; Navid Mohammadzadeh
- Edited by: Arsalan Amiri
- Distributed by: Nikan Film
- Release date: 16 May 2015 (Cannes)
- Running time: 105 minutes
- Country: Iran
- Language: Persian

Nahid is a 2015 Iranian drama film directed by Ida Panahandeh. It was screened in the Un Certain Regard section at the 2015 Cannes Film Festival where it won a Promising Future Prize (special jury prize for debut films).
