= Autumn Moon =

1992 Hong Kong-Japanese film by Clara Law

- VHS cover

Chinese name
- Traditional Chinese: 秋月
Transcriptions
Standard Mandarin
- Hanyu Pinyin: Qiūyuè
Yue: Cantonese
- Jyutping: Cau1 Jyut6
- Directed by: Clara Law
- Written by: Eddie Fong
- Produced by: Eddie Fong; Clara Law
- Starring: Masatoshi Nagase; Pui-Wai Li; Choi Siu Wan; Maki Kiuchi
- Cinematography: Tony Leung
- Edited by: Eddie Fong
- Music by: Tats Lau
- Production companies: Eizo Tanteisha; Right Staff Office Company; Trix Films
- Release dates: 13 August 1992 (Locarno Film Festival); 10 December 1992 (Hong Kong)
- Running time: 108 minutes
- Countries: Hong Kong; Japan
- Languages: Cantonese; Japanese

Autumn Moon is a 1992 comedy drama film directed by Clara Law and written by Eddie Fong. A Hong Kong-Japanese co-production, the film is about a Hong Kong high school girl befriending a twenty-something Japanese man who is visiting Hong Kong. The film stars Japanese actor Masatoshi Nagase, and the dialogue is a mixture of English, Cantonese, and Japanese. Hong Kong musician Tats Lau contributes to the film score.

== Plot ==
Pui Wai is a 15-year-old girl living with her grandmother in Hong Kong who spends much of her time thinking about her family and her future, namely what country she'll be living in, or to whom she'll be married. One day, while walking through the city, she spots a twenty-something Japanese man fishing off the side of a bridge. She tells him that the bridge is not a good spot for fishing, claiming that the fish there are not only small, but taste awful. The two hit it off, conversing predominantly in English as they don't understand each other's native languages. Eventually, the man asks her for restaurant recommendations, specifically a "traditional" spot. Pui Wai ponders for a moment before taking him to McDonald's. Although the man humorously tells her that this was not the sort of restaurant that he meant, they do end up having a meal there while sharing a little about their lives, like how McDonald's actually holds a special place in Pui Wai's heart as she celebrated many birthdays there with her friends and family. She worries that McDonald's food in any other country won't taste the same, a claim that the Japanese man attempts to refute. Pui Wai invites the man over to her house, and her grandmother prepares a meal for them all.

The next day, the man meets up with an older friend of his, Miki, for lunch. Although the two seem elated to see each other, they only make awkward small talk. It is implied that he once dated her sister. When Miki tells him that she recently divorced, they go back to his apartment to have sex. Meanwhile, Pui Wai recounts a memory of how devastated and scared she felt when her grandfather died; this incident affected her deeply, and created in her a fear of losing her grandmother too. In a conversation with her boyfriend the following morning, it is revealed that she has been frequently skipping school.

After another dinner at her home with the Japanese man, who says his name is simply Tokio, Pui Wai spends time with him under the city bridge, where they talk about their gradual lack of happiness, namely regarding the relationship trouble Pui Wai is feeling. Tokio brings up his own past relationships as an example, and how he grew unhappy after so many partners and experiences, reassuring Pui Wai that feeling this way is normal. Later, Pui Wai develops a fever yet mentions through voice-over how surprisingly comforting it is to be sick as long as her grandmother is taking care of her.

Pui Wai's grandmother falls ill sometime later, and she and Tokio visit her in the hospital. Pui Wai takes him back to her home for a meal, where they make instant noodles. They begin teasing one another, with them using a phrase in each other's native language. The two struggle to cook food without Pui Wai's grandmother. After taking care of her grandmother's cat, Pui Wai solemnly worries about what will happen if her grandmother dies, and reminisces about how her grandfather introduced her to poetry when she was little, having her recite poems on the regular.

Pui Wai's grandmother is reportedly feeling better, as is Pui Wai herself. While Pui Wai goes to visit her boyfriend and subsequently stay the night with him, Tokio agrees to look after her grandmother at the hospital. The grandmother gravely talks about how she wants the best for her family, and that she'll rest well knowing that they're living long, prosperous lives wherever they may be. This monologue seems to hit Tokio hard, and when he meets up with Miki, his older friend/partner, he sorrowfully questions the worth of his life, going over all that he's done and all that he hasn't. He breaks down in tears in the end, and she consoles him before they eventually have sex again. Pui Wai's date with her boyfriend starts off well, but later that night, he tells her about how far he's planned his future, believing that he can easily secure a job in the US, for example. These thought-out prospects seem to dishearten Pui Wai.

After their respective dates, Pui Wai brings her grandmother home the next day with Tokio's help, and they try taking care of her even though she is constantly over-exerting herself. Pui Wai hears back from her father, who has just bought a home overseas, meaning that she will be leaving Hong Kong soon to stay with the rest of her family. Pui Wai and Tokio go fishing, this time over the side of a small cliff at a spot that Pui Wai and her father used to fish years ago, where the fish are supposedly big and delicious. She tells Tokio that she wants to forget about her boyfriend, but Tokio urges her not to, at least not totally.

Soon after, during the Chinese Mid-Autumn Festival, Pui Wai lights lanterns with Tokio, who compares the festival to the Bon/Obon festivities back home in Japan. Pui Wai, stating that this year's festival will be her last before she leaves Hong Kong, begins reciting a part of a poem that her grandfather taught her long ago, although she cannot remember the full text. Nevertheless, she and Tokio have fun by shooting off fireworks by the beach together, happy and content.

== Reception ==
Film critic Stephen Holden of The New York Times described Autumn Moon as "gorgeous", "visually magnificent" and "elegiac", when it was shown at the New York Film Festival in 1992. In The Age, Virginia Trioli described the "cool and elegiac" film as "a revelation."

== See also ==
- List of Hong Kong films
