= Fereshteh Sadre Orafaee =

Iranian actress (born 1962)

- فرشته صدرعرفایی
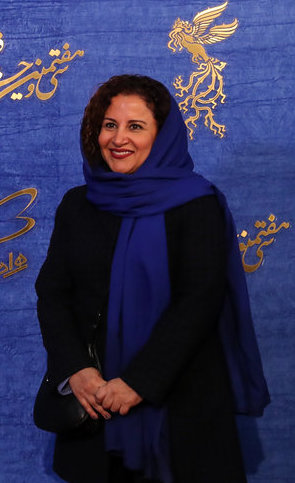
- Sadre Orafaee at the 2019 Fajr Film Festival
- Born: 29 December 1962 (age 63); Tehran, Iran
- Occupations: Actress; Voice Actress; Puppeteer
- Years active: 1988–present
- Spouse: Kambuzia Partovi (m. 1980; div. 2011)
- Website: IMDb profile

Fereshteh Sadre Orafaee (Persian: فرشته صدرعرفایی, born 29 December 1962) is an Iranian actress. She is best known internationally for her role as Pari in The Circle (2000), which has won several awards including the Golden Lion at the 57th Venice International Film Festival. Sadre Orafaee has won Best Actress at the 23rd Fajr Film Festival for her performance in Café Transit (2005) and Best Supporting Actress at the 37th Fajr Film Festival for her performance in When the Moon Was Full (2019).

== Filmography ==
=== Film ===
Year	Title	Role	Director
1987	Days of Waiting		Asghar Hashemi
1988	Rise		Fereydoun Jeyrani
1995	The White Balloon	Mother	Jafar Panahi
1999	Once Upon a Time		Iraj Tahmasb
2000	The Circle	Pari	Jafar Panahi
2001	Under the Moonlight		Reza Mirkarimi
2005	Café Transit	Reyhan	Kambuzia Partovi
2007	Human		Abdolreza Kahani
2009	Twenty		Abdolreza Kahani
2010	Endless Dreams	Mrs. Hemati	Pouran Derakhshandeh
2011	Goodbye		Mohammad Rasoulof
2013	The Coming Twilight	Fatemeh	Ali Sedaghat Karimi
2013	The Painting Pool	Teacher	Maziar Miri
2016	Seven Months	Zari	Hatf Alimardani
2017	One Kilo and Twenty One Grams		Rahim Toufan
2019	Yalda, a Night for Forgiveness		Masoud Bakhshi
2019	When the Moon Was Full	Ghamnaz	Narges Abyar
2020	Lady of the City	Shahrbanoo	Maryam Bahrololumi
2021	A Hero	Mrs. Radmehr	Asghar Farhadi
2025	Woman and Child		Saeed Roustaee

=== Web ===
Year	Title	Role	Director	Notes	Platform
2025–2026	Savushun	Fatemeh	Narges Abyar	Main role	Namava

=== Television ===
Year	Title	Role	Director	Network
2023–2024	Homeland		Kamal Tabrizi	IRIB TV3
