= Mr. Average =

2006 film

- Directed by: Pierre-Paul Renders
- Written by: Denis Lapière; Pierre-Paul Renders
- Starring: Khalid Maadour
- Cinematography: Virginie Saint-Martin
- Release date: 9 June 2006
- Running time: 90 minutes
- Countries: Belgium; Luxembourg; France; Canada; Germany
- Language: French
- Budget: $4.9 million
- Box office: $58,000

Mr. Average (French: Comme tout le monde) is a 2006 Belgian comedy film directed by Pierre-Paul Renders. It was entered into the 28th Moscow International Film Festival.

== Cast ==
- Khalid Maadour as Jalil
- Caroline Dhavernas as Claire
- Chantal Lauby as Françoise
- Gilbert Melki as Didier
- Thierry Lhermitte as President Chastain
- Delphine Rich as Arlette Chastaing
- Amina Annabi as Jalil's mother
- Rachid Chaib as Abdel, Jalil's younger brother
- Zakariya Gouram as Kader
- Pierre Lognay as Jérémie
- Suzan Anbeh as Zoé
- Christelle Cornil as Sandrine
- Thomas Coumans as Call TV presenter
- Jean-Luc Couchard as The Reporter
