= Denti =

- Directed by: Gabriele Salvatores
- Cinematography: Italo Petriccione
- Music by: Teho Teardo; Eraldo Bernocchi; Federico De Robertis
- Release date: 2000
- Country: Italy
- Language: Italian

Denti (Teeth) is a 2000 Italian comedy-drama film directed by Gabriele Salvatores. It is based on the novel with the same name written by Domenico Starnone. It entered the competition at the 57th Venice International Film Festival.

== Plot ==
Antonio has always had problems with his incisors: enormous and therefore embarrassing. During a quarrel Mara, the woman for whom he left his wife and two children and of whom he is extremely jealous, throws him a crystal ashtray breaking his teeth. He begins his wandering among dentists that will turn into a sort of journey in his own conscience, altered by painkillers, by quarrels with Mara and by memories and ghosts that resurface.

== Cast ==
- Sergio Rubini as Antonio
- Anita Caprioli as Mara
- Paolo Villaggio as Dr. Cagnano
- Claudio Amendola as Young Antonio
- Anouk Grinberg as Mother of Antonio
- Fabrizio Bentivoglio as Uncle Nino
- Tom Novembre: as Micco
- Angela Goodwin as Ciuta
- Barbara Cupisti as Dr. Calandra's Secretary
