= The Circle (2000 film) =

2000 film

- International festival poster
- دایره
- Directed by: Jafar Panahi
- Written by: Kambuzia Partovi
- Produced by: Jafar Panahi
- Starring: Nargess Mamizadeh; Maryiam Parvin Almani; Mojgan Faramarzi; Elham Saboktakin; Monir Arab; Solmaz Panahi; Fereshteh Sadre Orafaee; Fatemeh Naghavi
- Cinematography: Bahram Badakshani
- Edited by: Jafar Panahi
- Music by: Ali Zahmatkesh
- Production companies: Jafar Panahi Film Productions; Lumière & Company; Mikado Film; Tele+
- Distributed by: Mikado Film (Italy); Filmcoopi Zürich (Switzerland)
- Release dates: 6 September 2000 (VIFF); 8 September 2000 (Italy); 12 April 2001 (Switzerland)
- Running time: 90 minutes
- Countries: Iran; Italy; Switzerland
- Language: Persian
- Budget: $10,000
- Box office: $756,035

The Circle (Persian: دایره, romanized: Dâyere) is a 2000 Iranian drama film produced and directed by Jafar Panahi that criticizes the treatment of women in Iran. The film has won several awards, including the Golden Lion at the Venice Film Festival in 2000, but it is banned in Iran.

== Plot ==
The film begins in a maternity ward of a hospital, where the mother of Solmaz Gholami is upset to learn that her daughter has just given birth to a girl, even though the ultrasound indicated that the baby would be a boy. Worrying that the parents of the child's father will force their son to divorce her daughter, she tells another daughter to call her uncles.

At the phone booth, she passes by three young women, including Arezou and Nargess, who have just escaped prison. The three of them are trying to come up with money so that they can go to Nargess's home village. The third prisoner is immediately arrested, as she tries to pawn a gold chain, leaving just the two women. While waiting for Arezou in a market, Nargess spots a copy of A Wheatfield with Cypresses and mistakes it for a painting of her hometown. She shows it to Arezou, describing the paradise that awaits them at the end of their bus journey. Arezou acquires enough money from an acquaintance to get Nargess a bus ticket. Arezou decides not to go to Nargess' hometown, explaining that she would prefer to envision it as a paradise than to experience the real thing. The two of them separate.

At the bus station, Nargess convinces the clerk to issue her a ticket, despite not having a male companion or a student card. After buying a present to bring home, Nargess returns to the bus only to find it is being searched by police. She retraces her steps in search of Arezou, but cannot find her. Instead she tries to find another prisoner, Pari, who also snuck out of the prison that day. Pari's father aggressively denies Nargess entry to the house and lies that his daughter is dead. Just as Nargess leaves defeated, Pari's two brothers arrive, and angrily force their way into the house, in order to "talk" to their sister. Pari manages to escape, and eventually makes her way to a hospital where she finds Elham, another former prisoner who has hidden her past and is now a nurse, married to a doctor.

Pari confesses to Elham that she is four months pregnant and entreats her to help her abort the baby. Elham, concerned about arousing suspicions about her own past, is reluctant to do anything to help her, so Pari is left to wander the streets at night. Without ID, she cannot get into a hotel. At a street corner, she finds a mother trying to abandon her little girl, hoping that she will find a better life with a family. She continues wandering the street.

The mother is caught by an undercover police officer who thinks she is a prostitute, but she later manages to escape. Then, another woman who has been picked up as a prostitute is taken to prison. She is placed in a cell with other women we have previously met in the film, and the phone rings outside the metal door. A guard answers and comes to the window, calling for Solmaz Gholami, the woman with a baby girl in the first scene, bringing the story to a circular conclusion.

== Cast ==
- Nargess Mamizadeh as Nargess
- Maryiam Parvin Almani as Arezou
- Mojgan Faramarzi as Prostitute
- Elham Saboktakin as Nurse
- Monir Arab as Ticket seller
- Solmaz Panahi as Solmaz
- Fereshteh Sadre Orafaee as Pari
- Fatemeh Naghavi as Mother
- Abbas Alizadeh as Pari's father
- Negar Ghadyani
- Liam Kimber as Sahij
- Ataollah Moghadas as Haji
- Khadijeh Moradi
- Maryam Shayegan as Parveneh
- Maedeh Tahmasebi as Maedeh

== Structure ==
The film does not have a central protagonist: instead, it is constructed around a sequence of short interconnecting stories that illustrate the everyday challenges women face in Iran. Each story intersects, but none is complete, leaving the viewer to imagine both the background and the ending. All the actors are amateurs, except Fereshteh Sadre Orafaee who plays Pari, and Fatemeh Naghavi, who plays the mother abandoning her daughter.

Throughout the film, Panahi focuses on the little rules symbolizing difficulties of life for Iranian women, such as the need to wear a chador under certain circumstances, or not being allowed to travel alone. He frequently uses contrast to illustrate both happiness and misery in contemporary Tehran: for example, a marriage party, symbolizing a happy ending, takes place in the background while a young girl is abandoned. Similarly, the scene where Nargess describes to Arezou the beauty of the landscape of her hometown where she grew up playing with her brother, while taking care to point out the imperfections of the artist's hand, is a poignant reminder of hope and despair that runs as a common thread in the lives of his women characters throughout the film.

== Reception ==
The Circle received critical acclaim. On Rotten Tomatoes, the film has a 94% "fresh" score based on 63 reviews, with an average rating of 7.8/10. The site's consensus states: "Bleak, yet powerful, The Circle offers a searing indictment of the oppressive conditions experienced by women in Iran." Metacritic reports an 85 out of 100 score based on 28 critics, indicating "universal acclaim".
