= Woman and Child =

- Iranian promotional poster
- Persian: زن و بچه
- Directed by: Saeed Roustayi
- Written by: Saeed Roustayi
- Produced by: Jamal Sadatian
- Starring: Parinaz Izadyar; Payman Maadi; Hasan Pourshirazi; Fereshteh Sadre Orafaee; Sahar Goldoost; Soha Niasti; Arshida Dorostkar; Sinan Mohebi; Kaveh Ebrahim
- Cinematography: Adib Sobhani
- Edited by: Bahram Dehghani
- Music by: Ramin Kousha
- Production companies: Goodfellas; Iris Film
- Distributed by: Diaphana Distribution (France)
- Release dates: 22 May 2025 (Cannes); 23 July 2025 (Iran); 25 February 2026 (France)
- Running time: 131 minutes
- Countries: Iran; France
- Language: Persian

Woman and Child (Persian: زن و بچه, romanized: Zan O Bache) is a 2025 Iranian drama film written and directed by Saeed Roustayi, starring Parinaz Izadyar, Payman Maadi, Hasan Pourshirazi, Fereshteh Sadre Orafaee and Sahar Goldoost.

The film had its world premiere at the main competition of the 78th Cannes Film Festival on 22 May 2025, where it was nominated for the Palme d'Or. It was theatrically released in Iran on 23 July 2025 and in France on 25 February 2026.

== Synopsis ==
The film follows a 45-year-old widowed nurse named Mahnaz who is raising her children alone and struggling with her rebellious son. As she prepares to marry her fiancé, Hamid, her son Aliyar is suspended from school. When a tragic accident turns everything upside down, Mahnaz sets out to seek justice and reparation.

== Cast ==
- Parinaz Izadyar as Mahnaz
- Payman Maadi as Hamid
- Soha Niasti as Mehri
- Maziar Seyyedi as Samkhanian
- Fereshteh Sadre Orafaee as Mother
- Hasan Pourshirazi as Grandfather
- Sinan Mohebi as the child Aliyar
- Arshida Dorostkar as the child Neda
- Sahar Goldoost as Aliyar's aunt
- Javad Pourheidari
- Mansour Nasiri
- Rozhin Shams
- Kaveh Ebrahim as the police

== Production ==
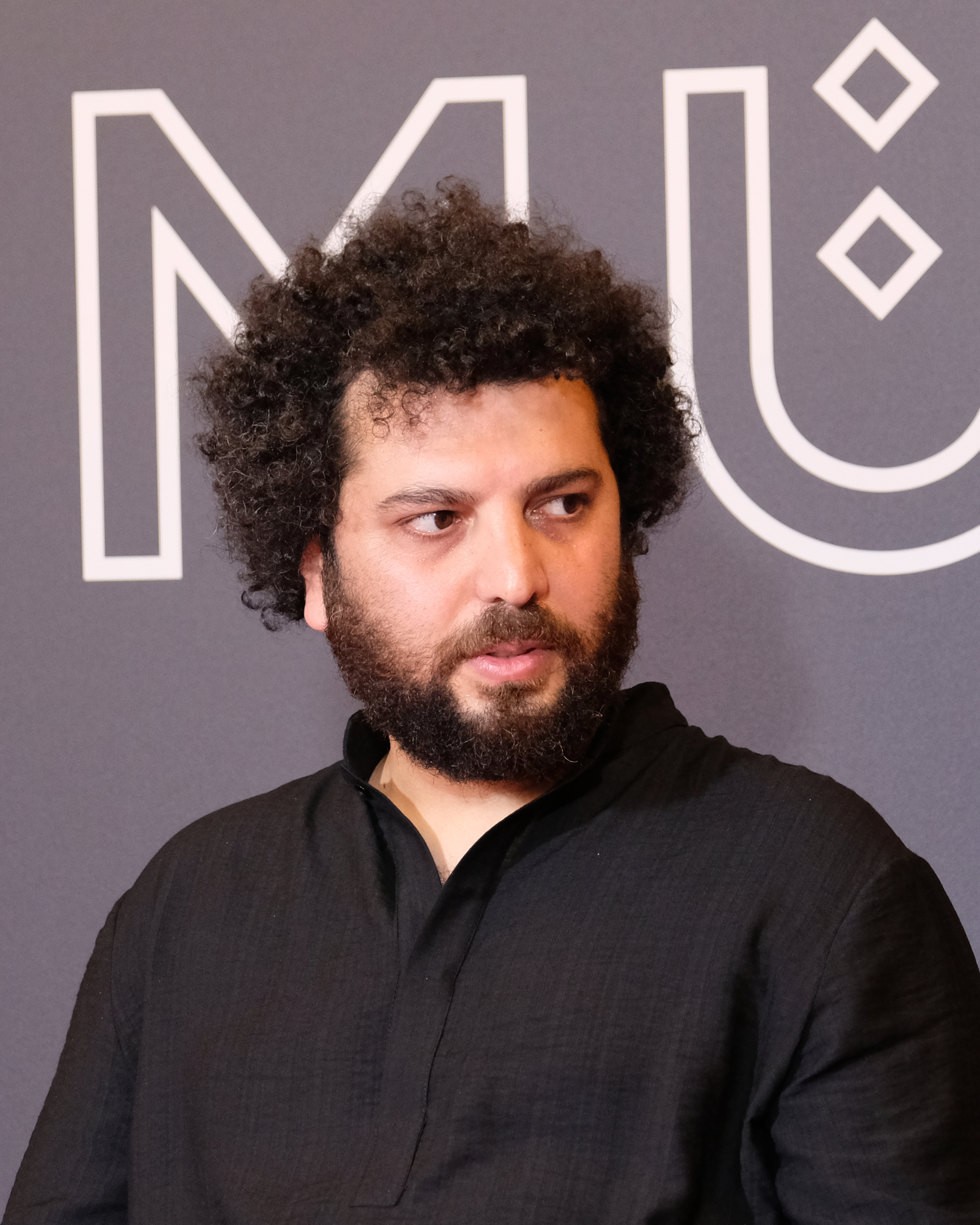
Director and writer, Saeed Roustayi

On 28 August 2024, it was announced that Saeed Roustayi's latest film, "Woman and Child," was in pre-production. On 1 September, Roustayi announced by posting a video on his Instagram page that he had written the script for his new film, "Woman and Child." On 24 November, the Iranian Organization of cinema issued a production license for the film. The movie will move to a different space from Saeed Roustayi's previous works, and is his fourth film after Leila's Brothers (2022), which had its world premiere at the main competition of the 2022 Cannes Film Festival.

Filming began in December with Parinaz Izadyar, Payman Maadi, Fereshteh Sadre Orafaee and Hasan Pourshirazi announced as the main actors. Roustayi announced on his Instagram page on 20 March 2025 that the production of the film had been completed. Bahram Dehghani was announced as the film editor, post-production work on the film was being carried out intensively aiming a Cannes premiere.

== Release ==
On 10 April, the list of films in the official selection of the 2025 Cannes Film Festival was announced, and the film was not selected. On 23 April, alongside Die My Love, the film was officially added to the festival's main competition for the Palme d'Or, marking Roustayi second film in the festival. It had its world premiere in Cannes on 22 May 2025.

=== Accolades ===
Award	Date of ceremony	Category	Recipient(s)	Result	Ref.
Cannes Film Festival	24 May 2025	Palme d'Or	Saeed Roustayi	Nominated	
