= Rose Byrne =

Australian actress (born 1979)

- Byrne in 2025
- Born: Mary Rose Byrne; 24 July 1979 (age 47); Balmain, New South Wales, Australia
- Education: University of Sydney
- Occupation: Actress
- Years active: 1994–present
- Partners: Brendan Cowell (2003–2010); Bobby Cannavale (2012–present)
- Children: 2

Mary Rose Byrne (born 24 July 1979) is an Australian stage and screen actress. She is particularly recognised for her leading roles in blockbuster comedies, independent dramas, and horror films. Her accolades include a Golden Globe Award, a Silver Bear, and a Volpi Cup, in addition to nominations for an Academy Award, BAFTA Award, Actor Award, two Primetime Emmy Awards, and a Tony Award. She is one of the few actors to be nominated for the Triple Crown of Acting.

Byrne made her screen debut in the film Dallas Doll (1994), and continued to act in Australian film and television throughout the 1990s and early 2000s. She gained her first leading film role in The Goddess of 1967 (2000), which earned her the Volpi Cup for Best Actress at the 57th Venice International Film Festival. She further demonstrated her range as an actress with roles in the comedy The Rage in Placid Lake (2003), the historical drama Marie Antoinette (2006), and the horror film 28 Weeks Later (2007).

Byrne established herself as a prominent comedienne with roles in films such as Get Him to the Greek (2010), Bridesmaids (2011), Neighbors (2014), Spy (2015), Neighbors 2: Sorority Rising (2016), and Instant Family (2018). During this period, she also starred in the horror franchise Insidious (2010–2023), the X-Men prequel films (2011–2016), and the family comedy films Peter Rabbit (2018) and Peter Rabbit 2: The Runaway (2021). For her performance as a troubled mother in the psychological drama If I Had Legs I'd Kick You (2025), she received the Silver Bear and the Golden Globe Award as well as a nomination for the Academy Award for Best Actress.

On television, Byrne starred as Ellen Parsons in the legal thriller series Damages (2007–2012), which earned her two consecutive Primetime Emmy Award nominations. She portrayed Gloria Steinem in the miniseries Mrs. America (2020), and led the Apple TV comedy series Physical (2021–2023) and Platonic (2023–present). She starred on Broadway in a revival of the screwball comedy You Can't Take It With You (2014–2015) and in the Noël Coward farce Fallen Angels (2026), the latter of which earned her a Tony Award for Best Actress in a Play nomination.

== Early life and education ==
Mary Rose Byrne was born on 24 July 1979 in the Sydney suburb of Balmain. She has Irish and Scottish ancestry. Byrne is the youngest of four children born to Jane and Robin Byrne. She has an older brother, George, and two older sisters, Lucy and Alice. In a 2009 interview, Byrne said that her mother was an atheist, while both she and her father were agnostic. Her family was described by The Daily Telegraph as "close-knit", and frequently kept her grounded as her career took off.

Byrne attended Balmain Public School, Australian Theatre for Young People (at age eight, encouraged by one of her sisters), and Hunters Hill High School before attending Bradfield Senior College for years 11 and 12.

She later lived in the Sydney suburbs of Newtown and Bondi. She auditioned for several major Australian drama schools, including Nepean, Western Australian Academy of Performing Arts (WAAPA), and National Institute of Dramatic Art (NIDA), but was not accepted into any of them. Instead, she studied an arts degree at Sydney University.

In 1999, she studied acting at the Atlantic Theater Company, which was developed by David Mamet and William H. Macy.

== Career ==
=== 1994–2006: Beginnings ===
Byrne obtained her first film role in Dallas Doll (1994) when she was 15 years old. Throughout the 1990s, she appeared in several Australian television shows, such as Wildside (1997) and Echo Point (1995), and starred as the love interest in the film Two Hands (1999), opposite fellow up-and-coming actor Heath Ledger. A role in the award-winning film My Mother Frank (2000) was followed by her first leading role in Clara Law's The Goddess of 1967 (also 2000), which gained her the Volpi Cup for Best Actress at the 57th Venice International Film Festival. Byrne revealed in a post-award interview that, prior to winning the Venice Film Festival Award, she was surprised by her own performance and found it confronting watching the film because her acting was "too depressing". Byrne admitted that "watching myself is confronting because I'm convinced I can't act and I want to get out, that's how insecure I am."

On stage, Byrne starred in La Dispute and in a production of Anton Chekhov's classic Three Sisters at the Sydney Theatre Company. In 2002, she made a brief appearance as Dormé, the handmaiden to Natalie Portman's Senator Padmé Amidala, in George Lucas's Star Wars: Episode II – Attack of the Clones. She then transitioned to Hollywood as she appeared in the 2002 thriller City of Ghosts, with Matt Dillon. Byrne had flown to the UK to shoot I Capture the Castle (2003), Tim Fywell's adaptation of the 1948 novel of the same title by Dodie Smith. In it, she portrayed Rose Mortmain, the elder sister of Romola Garai's Cassandra.

In 2003, Byrne starred in three Australian films; The Night We Called It a Day, with Melanie Griffith and Dennis Hopper; The Rage in Placid Lake, with Ben Lee; and Take Away, alongside Vince Colosimo, Stephen Curry, John Howard and Nathan Phillips. All films were comedies and opened to varying degrees of success at the box office, but The Rage in Placid Lake earned Byrne an AACTA Award nomination for Best Actress. In the epic drama Troy (2004), she took on the role of Briseis, the captured priestess presented to "amuse" Brad Pitt's Achilles. Variety's review of the film stated: "Byrne's spoils-of-war chattel plays more as a convenient invention than as a woman who could possibly turn Achilles' head and heart around". In her other 2004 film release, the thriller Wicker Park, Byrne appeared, opposite Josh Hartnett and Diane Kruger, as the girlfriend of a young advertising executive's old friend. Wicker Park director Paul McGuigan described her as the best actress he has worked with, and her Troy co-star Peter O'Toole described her as "beautiful, uncomplicated, simple, pure actress and a very nice girl".

Byrne reunited with Peter O'Toole, playing a young servant, in the BBC TV drama Casanova (2005), a three-episode production about 18th century Italian adventurer Giacomo Casanova. In 2005, she also starred with Snoop Dogg in The Tenants, based on Bernard Malamud's novel. In 2006, Byrne portrayed Gabrielle de Polastron, duchesse de Polignac, a French aristocrat and friend of Marie Antoinette, in Sofia Coppola's Marie Antoinette, with Kirsten Dunst; and appeared as a medical examiner who thinks the dead woman she is prepping is her missing sister in the critically acclaimed thriller The Dead Girl, directed by Karen Moncrieff.

=== 2007–2010: Damages and comedic film roles ===
In 2007, Byrne had significant parts in two studio sci-fi thriller films. She played a space vessel's pilot in Danny Boyle's Sunshine, alongside Cillian Murphy and Chris Evans, and also an army medical officer in Juan Carlos Fresnadillo's 28 Weeks Later, the sequel to Boyle's 28 Days Later. While Sunshine was mildly received, 28 Weeks Later was a critical success and grossed over US$64.2 million globally. In 2007, Byrne began playing Ellen Parsons, a bright, young attorney, in the FX legal thriller television series Damages, alongside Glenn Close. Her performance was widely praised; she was nominated for Primetime Emmy Awards for Outstanding Supporting Actress in a Drama Series in 2009 and 2010, and for Golden Globe Awards for Best Supporting Actress – Series, Miniseries, or Television Film in 2008 and 2010. She appeared in all 59 episodes of the series until its finale in September 2012.

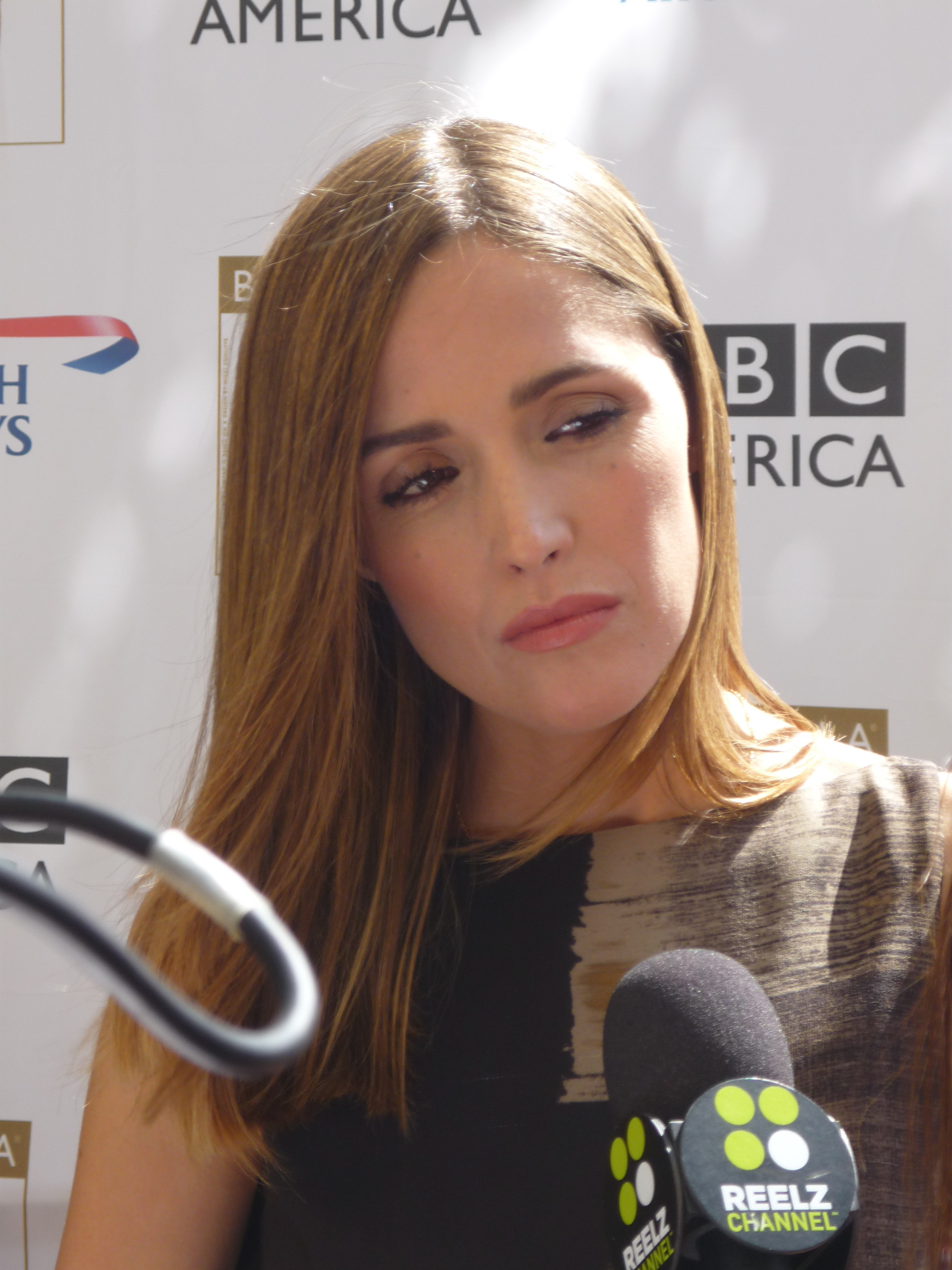
Byrne in 2010

Following starring roles in the 2008 independent films Just Buried, directed by Chaz Thorne, and The Tender Hook, with Hugo Weaving, Byrne returned to the mainstream with the role of the mother of a teen, alongside Nicolas Cage, in the sci-fi thriller Knowing (2009); it made US$186.5 million worldwide and received mixed reviews. Byrne said she had not yet become strategic about her film choices. "You gravitate to where you want to go, but so much is out of your control", she remarked. After the success of Damages, she asked her agents to send her out for comedies. "I was doing all of this really heavy, dramatic stuff, and I just needed a break,” she said. Her request was met when she obtained the role of a scandalous pop star and the on-and-off girlfriend of a free-spirited rock star in the comedy Get Him to the Greek (2010), also starring Russell Brand and Jonah Hill. Director Nicholas Stoller admitted that, in her audition, he thought: "'Why is she here?' Because, you know, very good actress, but very serious". Nevertheless, he noted that Byrne "just destroyed [...] Like, destroyed in the way that someone from Saturday Night Live would. And that was that". The film was a commercial success, with a gross of US$60.9 million in North America.

2011 was a turning point in Byrne's career, when she appeared in three high-profile theatrical films, leading to a trajectory that included three to four films per year. In her first 2011 release, James Wan's horror film Insidious, she starred as a mother whose son inexplicably enters a comatose state and becomes a vessel for malevolent spirits in an astral realm. Budgeted at US$1.5 million, it grossed US$97 million and began a franchise. The comedy Bridesmaids featured Byrne as the rich, beautiful, elite wife of the groom's boss, alongside Kristen Wiig, Maya Rudolph, Melissa McCarthy, Ellie Kemper, and Wendi McLendon-Covey. It was a critical and commercial success, it grossed US$26 million in its opening weekend and eventually over US$288 million worldwide. Byrne appeared in X-Men: First Class, directed by Matthew Vaughn, as Moira MacTaggert, a CIA agent in the 1960s and a character Byrne described as: "a woman in a man's world, she's very feisty and ambitious—you know, she's got a toughness about her which I liked". She said she was unfamiliar with both the comics and the film series, except for "what a juggernaut of a film it was". She was cast late into production, which had already begun. Her third and final 2011 film, First Class, was also a box office success, grossing US$353.6 million worldwide.

=== 2013–2019: Continued success ===
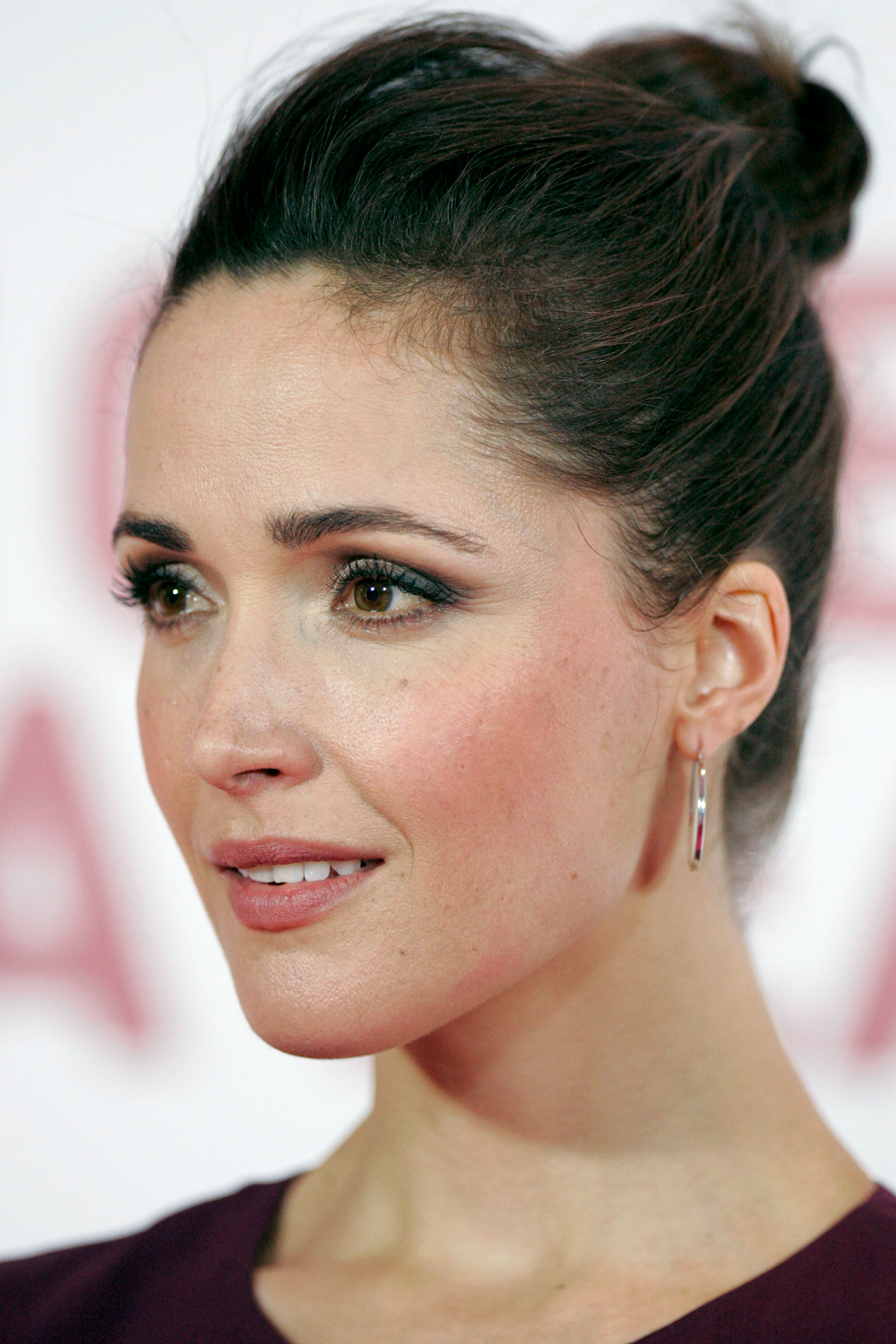
Byrne at the premiere of I Give It A Year in 2013

Byrne had four film releases and one short film in 2013. She obtained the part of the newlywed wife, opposite Rafe Spall, in I Give It a Year, a comedy about the trials and tribulations of a couple during their first year of marriage. The Hollywood Reporter found Byrne and Spall to be "mismatched", while Variety praised their chemistry and noted: "Year will do nothing but enhance the reputations of its core actors, especially Byrne, who's shaping up into an ace comedienne perfectly suited to screwball". The film was a commercial success in the UK and Australia, where it was given a wide release in theatres. In The Place Beyond the Pines, a generational drama directed by Derek Cianfrance, she appeared with Ryan Gosling and Bradley Cooper, as the wife of a police officer who shoots a bank robber and has to deal with the consequences. She played a Google executive in the film The Internship, opposite Vince Vaughn and Owen Wilson, as she was drawn to "the way it addressed the generational gaps and the ever-changing landscape of the technological world".

Byrne filmed The Turning, a short film installment in a Tim Winton omnibus feature, and worked again with fellow Australians Wan and Whannell for the sequel Insidious: Chapter 2, reuniting with Patrick Wilson and Lin Shaye. The film received mixed reviews from critics and became the biggest opening day in North America box office history for the month of September following its release. It eventually made over US$160 million against a budget of US$5 million. 2014 saw Byrne star in the family dramedies Adult Beginners and This Is Where I Leave You as well as the comedy Neighbors, alongside Seth Rogen and Zac Efron, in which she played one half of a couple who come into conflict with a fraternity that has recently moved in next door. Critics highlighted her performance in Neighbors, with The Atlantic writing: "Byrne walks away with the film by making [her character] a well-rounded, conflicted person, rather than the film's fun cop who has to tell everyone the boring truth". The film was a box office success, taking in US$270.1 million worldwide.

A critically panned but commercially successful remake of the 1982 classic Annie was released in December 2014 and featured Byrne playing the role of Grace Farrell, the titular character's mother figure and Mr. Stacks' faithful personal assistant. In 2015, Byrne reunited with Melissa McCarthy and starred with Jude Law and Jason Statham in the hit comedic action film Spy, playing the daughter of an arms dealer, and also starred with Susan Sarandon in the dramedy The Meddler as the daughter of an ageing widow who moves to Los Angeles in hopes of starting a new life after her husband passes away. The film was acclaimed by critics and found an audience in limited release. In 2016, she reprised her roles in Neighbors 2: Sorority Rising and X-Men: Apocalypse, The following year she filmed the black comedy I Love You, Daddy (2017) where she played a beautiful Hollywood actress. The film was directed by and also starring Louis C.K. which premiered at the Toronto International Film Festival but was dropped by its distributor following sexual misconduct accusations made against C.K. Byrne said of the experience that "Louis was very sweet with me, and I had a very respectful experience. But it's obviously very complicated" adding, "I think it will be a while before that film can be seen, and I think that's right."

In 2018, Byrne voiced Jemima Puddle-Duck and played a local woman named Bea who spends her time painting pictures of the rabbits in the live-action comedy Peter Rabbit, which made US$351.2 million worldwide. She reprised her role in the 2021 sequel Peter Rabbit 2: The Runaway. In Juliet, Naked (also 2018), a romantic comedy adapted from Nick Hornby's novel of the same name, she appeared as a woman dating an obscure rock musician (played by Ethan Hawke). The film was an arthouse success, with Rotten Tomatoes' critical consensus reading: "Juliet, Naked's somewhat familiar narrative arc is elevated by standout work from a charming cast led by a well-matched Rose Byrne and Ethan Hawke." Byrne appeared as the voice of the titular character in I Am Mother (2019), a thriller and sci-fi movie with Clara Rugaard and Oscar winner Hilary Swank. Byrne costarred with Adam DeVine, Alexandra Shipp, and Wanda Sykes, voicing a virtual assistant in the movie Jexi (2019). She voiced Brandy Cattle in season 3 of Bluey in the episodes, "Onesies" and "The Sign".

=== 2020–present: Career expansion ===
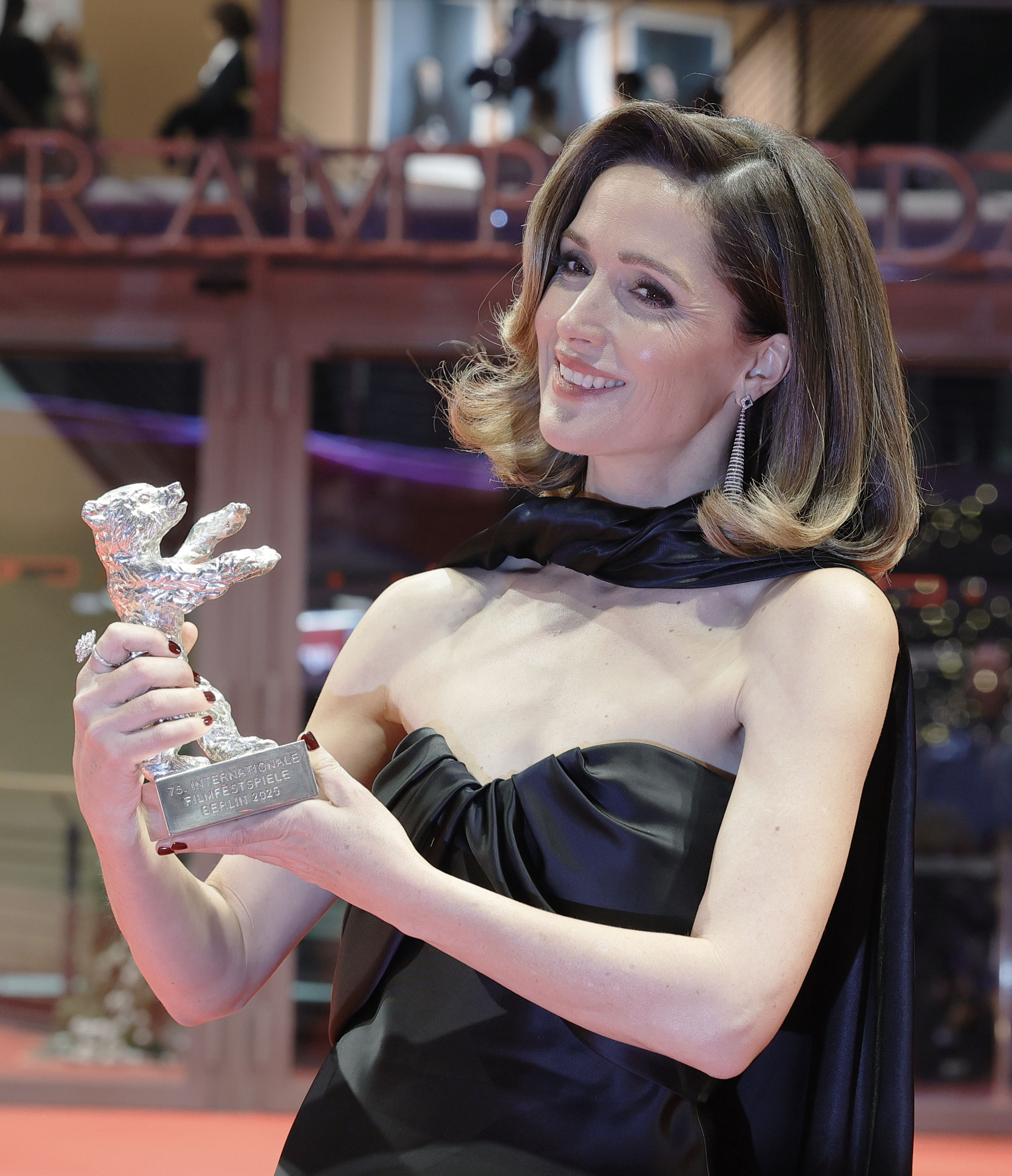
Byrne with the Silver Bear for her performance in If I Had Legs I'd Kick You at the 2025 Berlinale

In 2020, she starred opposite her husband Bobby Cannavale playing the title role in a revival of the greek tragedy Medea at the Brooklyn Academy of Music. Adam Feldman of Time Out praised the performance describing her as "riveting". Frank Scheck of The Hollywood Reporter noted that while "Byrne has proven herself a fine dramatic actress in the past" she has been overshadowed recently by her onscreen comedic roles.

In 2025, Byrne received widespread acclaim for her performance as a troubled mother in the Mary Bronstein directed psychological drama If I Had Legs I'd Kick You, which premiered to positive reviews at the 75th Berlin International Film Festival, winning her the Silver Bear for Best Leading Performance. Her performance was widely praised and it earned her numerous Best Actress awards, including the National Board of Review and Golden Globe, as well as nominations for the Academy, Actor, BAFTA and Critics' Choice Awards. She is the eighth Australian to be nominated for the Oscar in Best Actress.

In March of 2026, Byrne appeared on Broadway in the revival of Noël Coward's comedic farce Fallen Angels opposite Kelli O'Hara. She received positive reviews with Jason Zinoman of The New York Times praising their chemistry writing, "The dynamite performances of Byrne and O'Hara are the main event". For her performance she was nominated for the Tony Award for Best Actress in a Play.

== Public image ==
Byrne has been considered one of the world's most beautiful women. She ranked 9th and 16th in Australian FHM's "Sexiest Women in the World", in 2001 and 2006 respectively. She has been featured several times in "The Annual Independent Critics List of the 100 Most Beautiful Famous Faces from Around the World", ranking 15th (2004), 3rd (2005), 7th (2006), 5th (2007), 8th (2008), 1st (2009), and 15th (2010). She was also featured in the "Most Beautiful People" list of 2007 in Who Magazine, and ranked 5th in Hallmark Channel's 2008 "TV's Sexiest Leading Woman" poll. She was voted 78th on Ask Men's Top 99 'most desirable' woman of 2012 list, and People ranked her 7th in its "Best Dressed Celebrities" list of 2015. Byrne was the face of Max Factor between 2004 and 2009, and in 2014, she became the face of Oroton, the Australian producer of luxury fashion accessories.

Since the beginning of her career, her performances have been acclaimed by critics. In 2018, Byrne was noted for her comedic work. She consciously made the transition to less dramatic material in the late 2000s, finding the idea of being "boxed in" to be "insufferable". "You have to be aggressive in this business,” she noted. "You have always got to push for what you want. Working with Glenn [Close, on Damages], she was the hardest worker ever. She was constantly pushing". Her turn to comedy led to The Hollywood Reporter calling her "the most in-demand supporting actress for comedies". Decider wrote a story titled "How Did Rose Byrne Become One of Our Best Comedic Actresses?", in which it was remarked: "Byrne's emergence as one of the brightest stars in the Apatowverse is all the more remarkable for her lack of a comedy background. [...] Any doubts about Byrne's massive comedic talent—and after Bridesmaids and Neighbors, you'd have to be pretty stubborn to still have doubts—were put to rest with 2015's Spy, where she again steals the show as merciless terrorist Rayna. Byrne and McCarthy's private-plane banter is the highlight of the film and could have gone on another 30 minutes as far as I'm concerned".

== Personal life ==
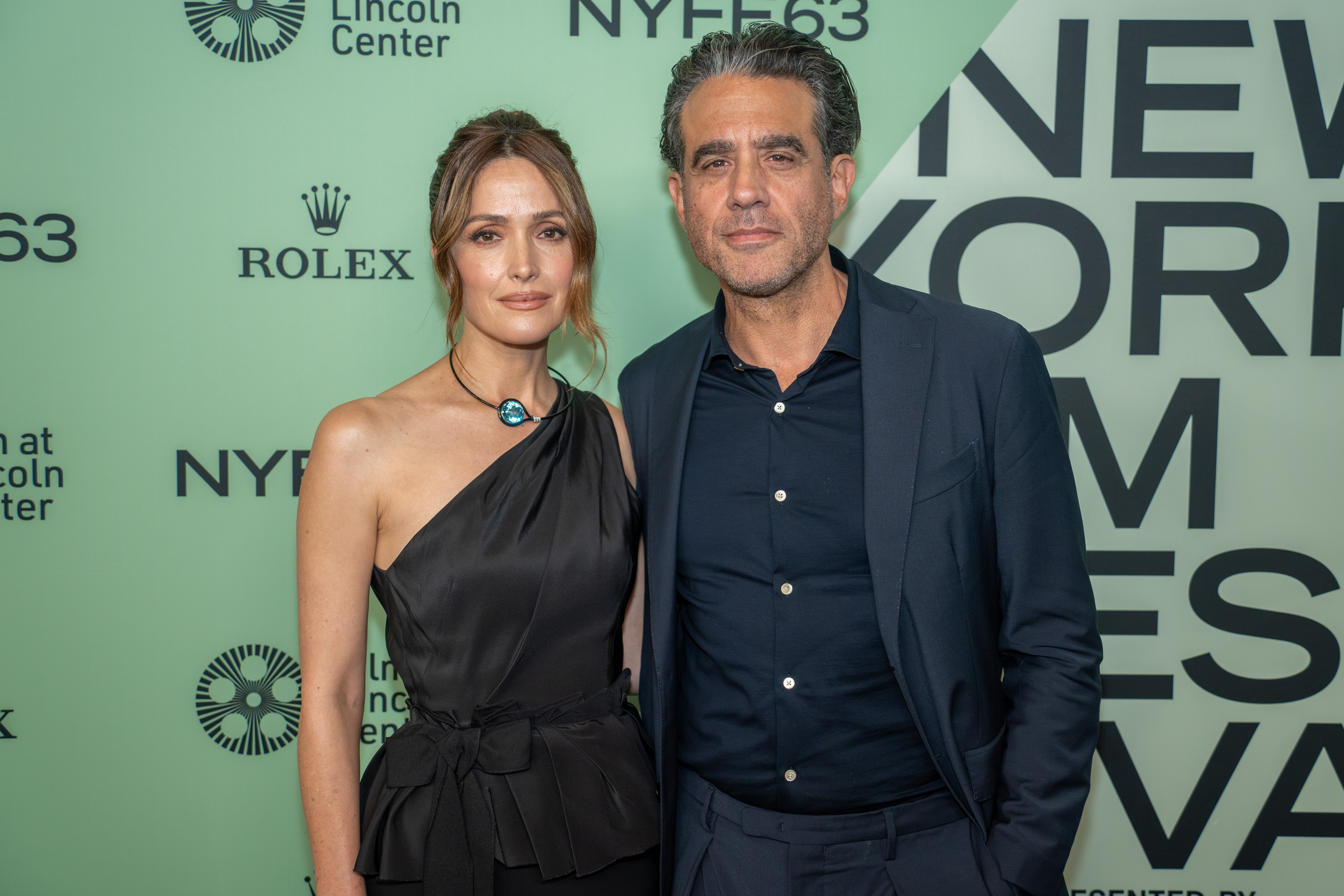
Byrne with husband Bobby Cannavale at the New York Film Festival in 2025

In 2013, Byrne lived in New York and said she remained insecure about a stable career: "I don't think that insecurity ever leaves you. You're a freelancer. There's always an element of uncertainty." Byrne has supported UNICEF Australia as the face of the 2007 Designers United campaign, and was a jury member of Tropfest in 2006 and Tropfest@Tribeca in 2007. She is a graduate and ambassador for NIDA's (National Institute of Dramatic Art) Young Actors Studio.

Through her brother George's marriage, Byrne is a sister-in-law of New Zealand actress Rose McIver. Byrne was in a relationship with Australian actor Brendan Cowell for over six years. He moved from Sydney to New York City following Byrne's success on Damages. Their relationship ended in January 2010. Byrne has been in a relationship with American actor Bobby Cannavale since 2012. They have two sons, born in February 2016 and November 2017. In 2026, Byrne referred to Cannavale as her husband.

== Acting credits ==
=== Film ===
Key
†	Denotes films that have not yet been released

Year	Title	Role	Notes
1994	Dallas Doll	Rastus Sommers	
1999	Two Hands	Alex	
2000	My Mother Frank	Jenny	
2000	The Goddess of 1967	B.G.	
2002	Star Wars: Episode II – Attack of the Clones	Dormé	
2002	City of Ghosts	Sabrina	
2003	I Capture the Castle	Rose Mortmain	
2003	The Night We Called It a Day	Audrey Appleby	
2003	The Rage in Placid Lake	Gemma Taylor	
2003	Take Away	Sonja Stilano	
2004	Troy	Briseis	
2004	Wicker Park	Alex Denver	
2005	The Tenants	Irene Bell	
2006	Marie Antoinette	Yolande de Polastron	
2006	The Dead Girl	Leah	Segment: "The Sister"
2007	Sunshine	Cassie	
2007	28 Weeks Later	Major Scarlet Levy	
2008	Just Buried	Roberta Knickle	
2008	The Tender Hook	Iris	
2009	Knowing	Diana Wayland	
2009	Adam	Beth Buchwald	
2010	I Love You Too	Drunk Passenger	Cameo
2010	Get Him to the Greek	Jackie Q	
2010	Insidious	Renai Lambert	
2011	Bridesmaids	Helen Harris III	
2011	X-Men: First Class	Moira MacTaggert	
2012	The Place Beyond the Pines	Jennifer Cross	
2013	I Give It a Year	Nat Redfern	
2013	The Internship	Dana Simms	
2013	The Turning	Raelene	Segment: "The Turning"
2013	Insidious: Chapter 2	Renai Lambert	
2014	Neighbors	Kelly Radner	
2014	Adult Beginners	Justine	
2014	This Is Where I Leave You	Penny Moore	
2014	Annie	Grace Farrell	
2014	Unity	Narrator	Documentary
2015	Spy	Rayna Boyanov	
2015	The Meddler	Lori Minervini	
2016	Neighbors 2: Sorority Rising	Kelly Radner	
2016	X-Men: Apocalypse	Moira MacTaggert	
2017	I Love You, Daddy	Grace Cullen	
2018	Insidious: The Last Key	Renai Lambert	Archive footage
2018	Juliet, Naked	Annie Platt	
2018	Peter Rabbit	Jemima Puddle-Duck (voice) / Bea	
2018	Instant Family	Ellie Wagner	
2019	I Am Mother	Mother (voice)	
2019	Jexi	Jexi (voice)	
2020	Like a Boss	Mel Paige	
2020	Irresistible	Faith Brewster	
2021	Peter Rabbit 2: The Runaway	Jemima Puddle-Duck (voice) / Bea	
2021	Puff: Wonders of the Reef	Narrator	
2022	Seriously Red	EP	
2022	Spirited	Ms. Blansky	Cameo
2023	Insidious: The Red Door	Renai Lambert	
2023	Teenage Mutant Ninja Turtles: Mutant Mayhem	Leatherhead (voice)	
2023	Ezra	Jenna	
2025	If I Had Legs I'd Kick You	Linda	Also executive producer
2025	Tow	Amanda Ogle	Also producer

=== Television ===
Key
†	Denotes television productions that have not yet been released

Year	Title	Role	Notes
1995	Echo Point	Belinda O'Connor	Main role, 130 episodes
1997	Fallen Angels	Siobhan	Episode: "Lerve, Lerve, Lerve"
1997	Wildside	Heidi Benson	2 episodes
1999	Big Sky	Angie	Episode: "A Family Affair"
1999	Heartbreak High	Carly Whitely	4 episodes
2000	Murder Call	Sarah Watson	Episode: "Still Life"
2005	Casanova	Edith	3 episodes
2007–2012	Damages	Ellen Parsons	Main role, 59 episodes
2012	American Dad!	Jenny (voice)	Episode: "Ricky Spanish"
2013	Portlandia	Fred's date	Episode: "Soft Opening"
2013	Hollywood Game Night	Herself	Episode: "Purr-ty People"
2016	No Activity	Elizabeth	Main role (season 2), 5 episodes
2016, 2024	Last Week Tonight with John Oliver	Chloe, Reporter Boeing employee in fake ad	Episode: "Journalism" Episode: "Boeing"
2017	The Immortal Life of Henrietta Lacks	Rebecca Skloot	Television film
2018	War on Waste	Herself	Episode 2.1
2018	Angie Tribeca	Norrah Newt	Episode: "Trader Foes"
2019	At Home with Amy Sedaris	Mary Finkleton	Episode: "All About Amy"
2020	Mrs. America	Gloria Steinem	Miniseries, 9 episodes
2021–2023	Physical	Sheila Rubin	Main role, 30 episodes; also executive producer
2022	The Boys	Herself	Episode: "Herogasm"; cameo
2022	The Last Movie Stars	Estelle Parsons (voice)	Episode: "Chapter Three: The Legend of Paul Leonard Newman"
2022–2024	Bluey	Brandy (voice)	2 episodes
2023–present	Platonic	Sylvia Greeves	Main role, 20 episodes; also executive producer
2024–2025	Tales of the Teenage Mutant Ninja Turtles	Leatherhead (voice)	6 episodes
2026	The Good Daughter	Samantha Quinn	Main role, 6 episodes; also executive producer

=== Theater ===
Year	Title	Role	Venue	Ref.
2000	La Dispute	Adine	Sydney Theatre Company	
2001	Three Sisters	Irina Sergeyevna Prozorova	Sydney Theatre Company	
2014–2015	You Can't Take It with You	Alice Sycamore	Longacre Theatre, Broadway	
2016	Speed-the-Plow	Karen	Rosyln Packer Theatre, Sydney	
2020	Medea	Medea	Brooklyn Academy of Music	
2026	Fallen Angels	Jane Banbury	Todd Haimes Theatre	

=== Music videos ===
Year	Song	Artist	Notes
2000	"Black the Sun"	Alex Lloyd	
2002	"I Miss You"	Darren Hayes	
2007	"Digital Versicolor"	Glass Candy	

== Awards and nominations ==
Award	Year	Category	Work	Result	Ref.
AACTA Awards	2014	Best Actress in a Leading Role	The Turning	Won	
AACTA Awards	2021	Best Actress in a Leading Role	Peter Rabbit 2: The Runaway	Nominated	
AACTA International Awards	2026	Best Actress	If I Had Legs I'd Kick You	Won	
Academy Awards	2026	Best Actress	If I Had Legs I'd Kick You	Nominated	
Actor Awards	2012	Outstanding Performance by a Cast in a Motion Picture	Bridesmaids	Nominated	
Actor Awards	2026	Outstanding Performance by a Female Actor in a Leading Role	If I Had Legs I'd Kick You	Nominated	
Astra Film Awards	2026	Best Actress - Comedy or Musical	If I Had Legs I'd Kick You	Nominated	
Austin Film Critics Association	2025	Best Actress	If I Had Legs I'd Kick You	Won	
Australian Film Critics Association	2014	Best Supporting Actress	The Turning	Won	
Australian Film Institute	2003	Best Actress in a Leading Role	The Rage in Placid Lake	Nominated	
Australian Film Institute	2007	International Award for Best Actress	Damages	Won	
Australian Film Institute	2009	International Award for Best Actress	Damages	Nominated	
BAFTA Awards	2026	Best Actress in a Leading Role	If I Had Legs I'd Kick You	Nominated	
Berlin International Film Festival	2025	Silver Bear for Best Leading Performance	If I Had Legs I'd Kick You	Won	
Broadway.com Audience Choice Awards	2026	Favorite Leading Actress in a Play	Fallen Angels	Nominated	
Broadway.com Audience Choice Awards	2026	Performance of the Year (Play)	Fallen Angels	Nominated	
Chicago Film Critics Association	2025	Best Actress	If I Had Legs I'd Kick You	Won	
Critics' Choice Movie Awards	2015	Best Actress in a Comedy	Neighbors	Nominated	
Critics' Choice Movie Awards	2026	Best Actress	If I Had Legs I'd Kick You	Nominated	
Dorian Awards	2026	Outstanding Lead Performance in a Broadway Play	Fallen Angels	Nominated	
Drama League Awards	2020	Distinguished Performance	Medea	Nominated	
Drama League Awards	2026	Distinguished Performance	Fallen Angels	Nominated	
Fangoria Chainsaw Awards	2012	Best Actress	Insidious	Won	
Film Critics Circle of Australia	2002	Best Actor – Female	The Goddess of 1967	Nominated	
Film Critics Circle of Australia	2014	Best Actress – Supporting Role	The Turning	Won	
Georgia Film Critics Association Awards	2025	Best Actress	If I Had Legs I'd Kick You	Nominated	
Golden Globe Awards	2008	Best Supporting Actress – Series, Miniseries or Television Film	Damages	Nominated	
Golden Globe Awards	2010	Best Supporting Actress – Series, Miniseries or Television Film	Damages	Nominated	
Golden Globe Awards	2026	Best Actress in a Motion Picture – Musical or Comedy	If I Had Legs I'd Kick You	Won	
Gotham Independent Film Awards	2025	Outstanding Lead Performance	If I Had Legs I'd Kick You	Nominated	
Independent Spirit Awards	2026	Best Lead Performance	If I Had Legs I'd Kick You	Won	
Indiana Film Journalists Association	2025	Best Lead Performance	If I Had Legs I'd Kick You	Nominated	
London Film Critics' Circle	2025	Actress of the Year	If I Had Legs I'd Kick You	Nominated	
Los Angeles Film Critics Association Awards	2025	Best Lead Performance	If I Had Legs I'd Kick You	Won	
Michigan Movie Critics Guild	2025	Best Actress	If I Had Legs I'd Kick You	Nominated	
Middleburg Film Festival	2025	Agnès Varda Trailblazing Film Artist Award	If I Had Legs I'd Kick You	Honored	
Mill Valley Film Festival	2025	Mind the Gap Award	If I Had Legs I'd Kick You	Honored	
MTV Movie Awards	2012	Best Gut-Wrenching Performance	Bridesmaids	Won	
MTV Movie Awards	2015	Best Comedic Performance	Neighbors	Nominated	
MTV Movie Awards	2015	Best Kiss	Neighbors	Nominated	
MTV Movie Awards	2015	Best WTF Moment	Neighbors	Won	
National Board of Review	2025	Best Actress	If I Had Legs I'd Kick You	Won	
National Society of Film Critics	2026	Best Actress	If I Had Legs I'd Kick You	Runner-up	
New York Film Critics Circle	2025	Best Actress	If I Had Legs I'd Kick You	Won	
Outer Critics Circle Award	2026	Outstanding Lead Performer in a Broadway Play	Fallen Angels	Nominated	
Palm Springs International Film Festival	2026	Breakthrough Performance Award	If I Had Legs I'd Kick You	Honored	
Phoenix Critics Circle	2025	Best Actress	If I Had Legs I'd Kick You	Nominated	
Primetime Emmy Awards	2009	Outstanding Supporting Actress in a Drama Series	Damages	Nominated	
Primetime Emmy Awards	2010	Outstanding Supporting Actress in a Drama Series	Damages	Nominated	
San Diego Film Critics Society	2025	Best Actress	If I Had Legs I'd Kick You	Won	
San Francisco Film Critics	2025	Best Actress	If I Had Legs I'd Kick You	Won	
Satellite Awards	2010	Best Supporting Actress – Series, Miniseries or Television Film	Damages	Nominated	
Savannah Film Festival	2025	Luminary Award	If I Had Legs I'd Kick You	Honored	
Scream Awards	2011	Best Horror Actress	Insidious	Nominated	
Seattle Film Critics Society	2025	Best Actress in a Leading Role	If I Had Legs I'd Kick You	Nominated	
Sitges Film Festival	2025	Best Actress	If I Had Legs I'd Kick You	Won	
St. Louis Film Critics Association	2025	Best Actress	If I Had Legs I'd Kick You	Nominated	
Toronto Film Critics Association	2025	Outstanding Lead Performance	If I Had Legs I'd Kick You	Won	
Tony Award	2026	Best Actress in a Play	Fallen Angels	Nominated	
Venice Film Festival	2000	Volpi Cup for Best Actress	The Goddess of 1967	Won	
Washington D.C. Area Film Critics Association	2025	Best Actress	If I Had Legs I'd Kick You	Nominated	

== See also ==
- List of agnostics
- List of Australian film actors
- List of Academy Award winners and nominees from Australia
- List of actors with Academy Award nominations
- List of Golden Globe winners
