= Letters to Ali =

2004 film by Clara Law

- DVD cover
- Directed by: Clara Law
- Produced by: Clara Law; Eddie Fong; James Hewison
- Narrated by: Matt Damon
- Cinematography: Eddie Fong
- Edited by: Eddie Fong
- Music by: Paul Grabowsky
- Distributed by: Lunar Films
- Release date: 7 September 2004 (Italy)
- Running time: 106 minutes
- Country: Australia
- Language: English

Letters to Ali is a 2004 documentary film about the story of an asylum seeker, a family and a filmmaker.

The movie pictures the hardship of the asylum seekers, and pays attention to the fact that (at the time of the film's release) Australia remains the only western country that keep children in detention centres.

== Awards ==
Award	Date of ceremony
Official Selection Melbourne International Film Festival	2004
Official Selection Venice International Film Festival	2004
Official Selection Toronto International Film Festival	2004
