= A Hero =

2021 film by Asghar Farhadi

- Theatrical release poster
- Persian: قهرمان
- Directed by: Asghar Farhadi
- Written by: Asghar Farhadi
- Produced by: Alexandre Mallet-Guy; Asghar Farhadi
- Starring: Amir Jadidi; Mohsen Tanabandeh; Sahar Goldoost; Fereshteh Sadr Orafaie; Sarina Farhadi
- Cinematography: Ali Ghazi
- Edited by: Hayedeh Safiyari
- Production company: Memento Films
- Distributed by: Khaneh Film (Iran); Memento Films (France)
- Release dates: 13 July 2021 (Cannes); 26 October 2021 (Iran); 15 December 2021 (France)
- Running time: 127 minutes
- Countries: Iran; France
- Language: Persian
- Box office: $2.9 million

A Hero (Persian: قهرمان, romanized: Qahremaan) is a 2021 drama film written, co-produced and directed by Asghar Farhadi, starring Amir Jadidi, Mohsen Tanabandeh and Sahar Goldoost.

The film was selected to the Palm d'Or competition at the 2021 Cannes Film Festival, winning the Grand Prix. It was selected as the Iranian entry for the Best International Feature Film at the 94th Academy Awards, and was one of the 15 shortlisted films for the category, but was not nominated.

== Plot ==
Rahim Soltani is temporarily released from prison for a two-day period in order to settle an unpaid debt of 150,000,000 tomans to Bahram. Rahim's lover, Farkondeh, has acquired a lost handbag containing several gold coins, which they both attempt to sell in order to repay the debt, but find that gold has lost value to the point where Rahim cannot repay Bahram in full. In the meantime, he moves in with his sister Malileh and her husband Hossein.

Malileh discovers the handbag and coins and confronts Rahim about it, leading Rahim to pursue the original owner of the handbag and return it to them. After the original owner comes to claim the bag (which Rahim claims he found), Rahim is praised for his selfless act and his story is covered by the media before he returns to prison and becomes a local celebrity. Bahram is immediately suspicious of Rahim's story, believing he is trying to restore his image and leave prison to stop the impending second marriage of his ex-wife. The prison begins to arrange for Rahim's release.

At a charity event to raise money and provide employment for Rahim, Bahram is incensed to learn that less than a quarter of the debt's total has been raised. He explains to the organizers that Rahim, then unable to take out a loan from a bank, received the money from Bahram that he acquired from a loan shark, who he eventually had to repay when Rahim failed to make payments. Despite this, Bahram agrees to have Rahim released for the sake of his estranged son, Siavash.

While applying for his new job, Rahim learns that rumors have begun to spread disputing his supposed discovery and returning of the handbag, prompting Rahim to locate the woman in order for her to confirm his story, though his search is fruitless. Rahim and Malileh plot to have Farkondeh pose as the woman, using details from the actual encounter to validate Rahim's story. The hiring manager produces a text from Rahim to Bahram offering to pay half the debt a week before the day he claimed to have found the bag, leading him to reject Rahim's application.

Certain that Bahram forwarded the incriminating text exchange, Rahim confronts him at his printing shop, but Bahram denies it. After Bahram accuses Rahim of using his son for sympathy, Rahim physically attacks him, and nearby shopkeepers help restrain Rahim while the police arrive. Farkondeh arrives and manages to convince Bahram to let Rahim go.

Rahim is called by the charity organization to inform him of a video made by Bahram's daughter Nazanin, which shows footage of his fight with Bahram while also unveiling his and Farkondeh's relationship. Nazanin threatens to release the video publicly if Rahim doesn't pay his debt in full by the next day. In light of this evidence, Rahim is forced to unveil the truth about the bag. Fearing a scandal, the organization decides to withhold the money raised for Rahim. On the last day of his leave, Rahim is informed by the charity organizer that the funds raised for him will instead be used toward the release of a man scheduled to be executed, and Farkondeh convinces her to tell the media that it was Rahim's idea in order to help him retain some of his honor.

Nazanin's video is released, and Farkondeh's family forbids her from seeing Rahim again. While filming a video about Rahim's most recent “act” of charity to soften the backlash, Siavash is coached into crying on camera by Rahim's parole officer, Salehi, and Rahim, wanting to protect his son, relents and wishes for the video to not be released. When Salehi refuses, Rahim fights him outside until he eventually deletes it. The following morning, Farkondeh and Siavash accompany Rahim back to prison to serve the remainder of his sentence.

== Cast ==
- Amir Jadidi as Rahim
- Mohsen Tanabandeh as Bahram
- Sahar Goldoost as Farkhondeh
- Fereshteh Sadr Orafaie as Mrs. Radmehr
- Sarina Farhadi as Nazanin
- Amir Hossein Mohabat as Hamed

== Production ==
Memento Films shopped the rights to the script by Farhadi during the 2020 European Film Market in Berlin. The film entered pre-production in June 2020 and filmed through December 2020. Production took place in Shiraz. In April 2021, it was revealed that Amazon Studios had acquired rights to distribute the film in the United States.

== Release ==
The film had its premiere at 2021 Cannes Film Festival on 13 July 2021, as it was selected to compete for the Palme d'Or at the festival. It was also selected as closing film of the 52nd International Film Festival of India on 28 November 2021.

== Legal disputes ==
A Hero was inspired by the story of Mohammad Reza Shokri, a man who returned a bag of cash he found while on a leave from a debtors' prison in Shiraz, although Farhadi has stated in interviews that it "was not inspired by a specific news item". Azadeh Masihzadeh made a documentary about Shokri from 2014 to 2015, when she attended a workshop taught by Farhadi on documentary filmmaking at the Karnameh Institute in Tehran. In the course, Farhadi assigned his students to research and film a documentary about people who had found and returned valuable objects to their original owners. According to Masihzadeh, while most students in the class took subjects from a list of excerpts from news media Farhadi provided them with, she decided to work in her hometown of Shiraz to save expenses, and an acquaintance told her that she saw a news story about Shokri on local television. Masihzadeh then went to a local newspaper and the TV station that aired the news, obtained permission to film in prison, and met Shokri. Farhadi saw rushes and gave her notes at five sessions over six months. Five projects in the workshop, including Masihzadeh's, were to be consolidated into one film, with Farhadi's involvement obscured so as not to raise too much expectation. Masihzadeh obtained permission from Farhadi to screen her film by itself. Under the title All Winners, All Losers, the film screened at the Shiraz Arts Festival in 2018, where it won the Special Jury Prize. Later, Masihzadeh was told that the collective film had finally been completed and that her segment would not be included if she continued screening her film. With the understanding that Farhadi's name would appear in the credits, she agreed to withdraw her film from festivals.

In August 2019, when Masihzadeh was enrolled in a screenwriting workshop by Farhadi at the Bamdad Institute in Tehran, Farhadi asked Masihzadeh to sign a document stating that the idea for All Winners, All Losers belonged to Farhadi. In the presence of Parisa Bakhtavar, his wife and director of the institute, and secretary Farideh Shafiei, Masihzadeh obliged, which she later said she did under pressure. A lawyer for Memento Films, the French producer and distributor of A Hero, later pointed out that the document had no legal value as "ideas and concepts are not protected by copyright".

In late 2020, Masihzadeh learned that Farhadi was making a film in Shiraz, and tried, in vain, to contact him in the city. After learning the plot of A Hero when it was announced to be in Cannes competition, Masihzadeh sent five people to watch the film at Cannes and report back. She estimated a 70% resemblance based on their report and began posting similarities they spotted on Instagram under the hashtag #a_hero.

In September 2021, Masihzadeh's lawyer sent Farhadi a message stating that her intellectual property rights had been violated and requesting "dialogue and negotiation". A month later, a meeting was held at the House of Cinema, where Farhadi's lawyer told Masihzadeh that she had committed the crime of defamation and that a complaint would be filed against her if she did not delete her Instagram posts. Another meeting took place two days later, this time with Farhadi in attendance, and he accused Masihzadeh of lying and being ungrateful. Farhadi offered to mention her in the end credits as a researcher and pay her roughly $1,600, while she requested that opening credits state A Hero was based on her film and that she share in the film's revenue. The House of Cinema's arbitration council issued a decision concluding that Masihzadeh's claim was false.

In early November 2021, Farhadi filed a criminal complaint with the Tehran Culture and Media Court, accusing Masihzadeh of defamation and spreading misinformation. On November 30, 2021, Masihzadeh filed a counterclaim, accusing Farhadi of plagiarism, intellectual property theft, and "illegitimate gains by fraud or abuse of privilege". In January 2022, Farhadi filed another complaint accusing Masihzadeh of defamation and misinformation, in regard to her claim that she was coerced to sign a statement. Masihzadeh claimed that she discovered the story herself and that it had not been reported in national media at the time, while Farhadi's lawyer argued that the story had already been reported in media. The manager of the workshop told media that she shares Masihzadeh's recollection. A fellow student who attended the workshop also testified in support of Masihzadeh in court, while some other students signed a statement in support of Farhadi denying the allegation. Masihzadeh faced up to one year in prison or 74 lashes, though corporal punishment is rare for first offenders and the prison time may be avoided by paying fines.

Masihzadeh found 56 similarities between her film and A Hero, 49 of which had not been reported in the press, such as the original owner of the money discovering the notice at a bank, her husband's unawareness of the loss of the money, and prison staff's improved treatment of Shokri after he returned the money.

In March 2022, the magistrate for the case issued an opinion finding merit in Masihzadeh's claims, and indicted Farhadi and referred the case to a criminal court, while dismissing Farhadi's complaints and Masizadeh's claim to revenue. On 4 April 2022, The Hollywood Reporter erroneously reported that Farhadi had been convicted, which he could not appeal, only to issue a correction stating that he had been merely indicted and that the case would now move to a second judge, whose ruling may still be appealed. Farhadi denied the charges in the criminal proceedings. On 13 March 2024, a court issued a verdict acquitting Farhadi of the plagiarism charges, based on the opinion of a panel consisting of three University of Tehran professors specialising in copyright law and four official art experts, which stated that the events depicted in the documentary had been widely reported in media and belonged to the public domain.

In November 2021, Masihzadeh met Shokri in prison in Shiraz and, with permission, took him to a screening of A Hero, which she had bought out. Shokri saw the film in shackles and handcuffed. He was particularly offended by the film's inclusion of the protagonist's son with stuttering, as he had a brother who had difficulty speaking, who had died after the making of the documentary and whom Shokri had asked Masihzadeh not to film so as not to arouse pity. Shokri filed a complaint against Farhadi for defamation and revelation of personal information, among other charges, stating that he had granted Masihzadeh an exclusive permission to depict his story. The magistrate dismissed the complaint.

== Reception ==
=== Critical response ===
On the review aggregator website Rotten Tomatoes, 96% of 164 critics' reviews are positive, with an average rating of 8.0/10. The website's consensus reads: "A Hero finds writer-director Asghar Farhadi once again grappling with weighty themes – with the audience emerging as the winner." Metacritic, which uses a weighted average, assigned the film a score of 82 out of 100, based on 39 critics, indicating "universal acclaim".

Filmmaker Mira Nair praised the film, calling it "a beautiful and unexpected drama where each of its deceptively casual parts gradually uncovers a culture wherein we no longer observe “the other” in what is often presented to us as foreign land, instead seeing ourselves in Iran’s kaleidoscopic prism. What is right? What is wrong?"

=== Accolades ===
Year	Award	Category	Nominated	Result
2021	Cannes Film Festival	Palme d'Or	Asghar Farhadi	Nominated
2021	Cannes Film Festival	Grand Prix	Asghar Farhadi	Won
2021	Cannes Film Festival	François Chalais Prize	Asghar Farhadi	Won
2021	Asia Pacific Screen Awards	Best Feature Film	Alexandre Mallet Guy and Asghar Farhadi	Nominated
2021	Asia Pacific Screen Awards	Achievement in Directing	Asghar Farhadi	Won
2021	Asia Pacific Screen Awards	Best Screenplay	Asghar Farhadi	Nominated
2021	Asia Pacific Screen Awards	Best Actor	Amir Jadidi	Nominated
2021	Valladolid International Film Festival	Best Film	Asghar Farhadi	Nominated
2021	Montclair Film Festival	Narrative Feature Competition	Asghar Farhadi	Nominated
2021	Santa Fe Independent Film Festival	Best Narrative Feature	Asghar Farhadi	Won
2021	Hafez Awards	Best Motion Picture	Alexandre Mallet Guy and Asghar Farhadi	Won
2021	Hafez Awards	Best Director – Motion Picture	Asghar Farhadi	Won
2021	Hafez Awards	Best Screenplay – Motion Picture	Asghar Farhadi	Won
2021	Hafez Awards	Best Actor – Motion Picture	Amir Jadidi	Won
2021	Hafez Awards	Best Actor – Motion Picture	Mohsen Tanabandeh	Nominated
2021	Hafez Awards	Best Actress – Motion Picture	Sahar Goldoost	Nominated
2021	Hafez Awards	Best Cinematography – Motion Picture	Ali Ghazi	Nominated
2021	Hafez Awards	Best Editor – Motion Picture	Hayedeh Safiyari	Won
2021	Satellite Awards	Best Original Screenplay	Asghar Farhadi	Nominated
2021	Satellite Awards	Best Foreign Language Film	Alexandre Mallet Guy and Asghar Farhadi	Nominated
2021	Chicago Film Critics Association	Best Foreign Language Film	Alexandre Mallet Guy and Asghar Farhadi	Nominated
2021	Dallas–Fort Worth Film Critics Association	Best Foreign Language Film	Alexandre Mallet Guy and Asghar Farhadi	Nominated
2021	IndieWire Critics Poll	Best Screenplay	Asghar Farhadi	Nominated
2021	IndieWire Critics Poll	Best International Film	Alexandre Mallet Guy and Asghar Farhadi	Nominated
2021	Las Vegas Film Critics Society Awards	Best International Film	Alexandre Mallet Guy and Asghar Farhadi	Nominated
2021	National Board of Review	Best Original Screenplay	Asghar Farhadi	Won
2021	National Board of Review	Best Foreign Language Film	Alexandre Mallet Guy and Asghar Farhadi	Won
2021	North Texas Film Critics Association	Best Foreign Language Film	Alexandre Mallet Guy and Asghar Farhadi	Nominated
2021	St. Louis Film Critics Association	Best International Film	Alexandre Mallet Guy and Asghar Farhadi	Nominated
2021	Utah Film Critics Association Awards	Best Non-English Language Film	Alexandre Mallet Guy and Asghar Farhadi	Nominated
2021	Washington DC Area Film Critics Association Awards	Best Foreign Language Film	Alexandre Mallet Guy and Asghar Farhadi	Nominated
2022	Palm Springs International Film Festival	Bridging the Borders Award	Asghar Farhadi	Won
2022	Palm Springs International Film Festival	FIPRESCI Prize for Best International Feature Film	Alexandre Mallet Guy and Asghar Farhadi	Nominated
2022	Palm Springs International Film Festival	FIPRESCI Prize for Best International Screenplay	Asghar Farhadi	Won
2022	Palm Springs International Film Festival	FIPRESCI Prize for Best Actor in an International Feature Film	Amir Jadidi	Won
2022	Chicago Indie Critics Awards (CIC)	Best Foreign Language Film	Alexandre Mallet Guy and Asghar Farhadi	Nominated
2022	Chicago Indie Critics Awards (CIC)	Best Original Screenplay	Asghar Farhadi	Nominated
2022	Denver Film Critics Society	Best Foreign Language Film	Alexandre Mallet Guy and Asghar Farhadi	Nominated
2022	Columbus Film Critics Association	Best Foreign Language Film	Alexandre Mallet Guy and Asghar Farhadi	Nominated
2022	Alliance of Women Film Journalists	Best Non-English Language Film	Alexandre Mallet Guy and Asghar Farhadi	Nominated
2022	Critics' Choice Movie Awards	Best Foreign Language Film	Alexandre Mallet Guy and Asghar Farhadi	Nominated
2022	Golden Globe Awards	Best Foreign Language Film	Alexandre Mallet Guy and Asghar Farhadi	Nominated
2022	San Francisco Bay Area Film Critics Circle	Best Foreign Language Film	Alexandre Mallet Guy and Asghar Farhadi	Nominated
2022	Hollywood Critics Association	Best International Film	Alexandre Mallet Guy and Asghar Farhadi	Nominated
2022	North Carolina Film Critics Association	Best Foreign Language Film	Alexandre Mallet Guy and Asghar Farhadi	Nominated
2022	Iranian Cinema Directors' Great Celebration	Best Film Director	Asghar Farhadi	Won

== See also ==
- List of submissions to the 94th Academy Awards for Best International Feature Film
- List of Iranian submissions for the Academy Award for Best International Feature Film
