= The Goddess of 1967 =

- Film poster
- Directed by: Clara Law
- Written by: Clara Law; Eddie Ling-Ching Fong
- Produced by: Eddie Ling-Ching Fong; Dennis Kiely
- Starring: Rose Byrne; Rikiya Kurokawa
- Cinematography: Dion Beebe
- Edited by: Kate Williams
- Music by: Jen Anderson
- Production company: Still Life Pictures
- Distributed by: Palace Films
- Release dates: September 3, 2000 (Venice); April 25, 2001 (Australia)
- Running time: 119 minutes
- Country: Australia
- Languages: English; Japanese

The Goddess of 1967 is a 2000 Australian film directed by Clara Law, who wrote the script with her husband Eddie Ling-Ching Fong.

It won several awards, including the Volpi Cup for Best Actress for Rose Byrne at the 57th Venice International Film Festival and Best Director at the Chicago International Film Festival.

== Plot ==
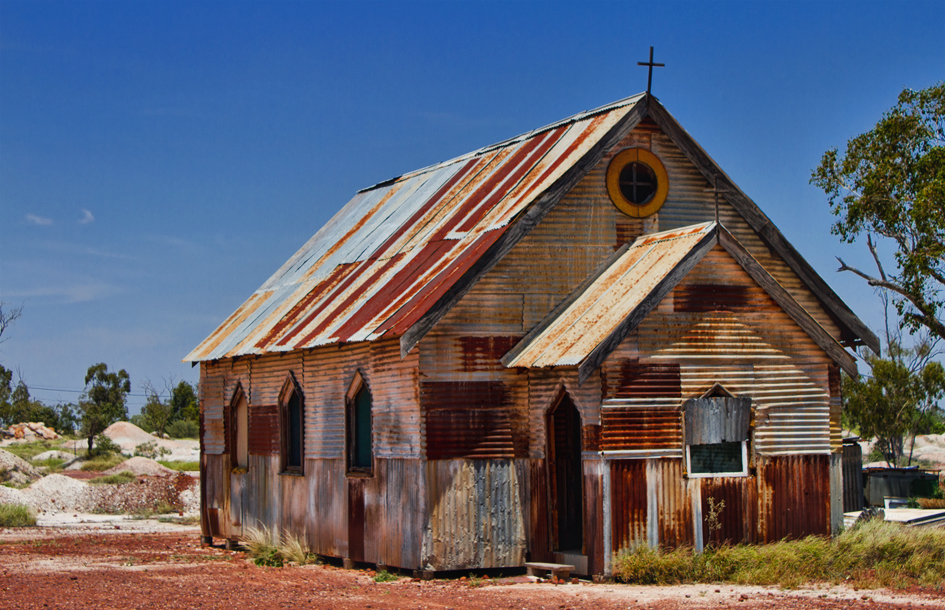
The Corrugated Iron Church, Lightning Ridge, one of the film's locations.

JM (Rikiya Kurokawa), a rich IT worker and computer hacker, lives in a clinical Tokyo apartment and rarely speaks to his live-in girlfriend. After tracing a perfectly restored 1967 model Citroën DS (or 'Goddess') in Australia, JM abandons his job and flies out to purchase the car, which he believes can fill the emptiness in his life.

In Australia, JM finds the home where the car is located and meets BG (Rose Byrne), a blind and emotionally unstable young woman. She lets him test drive the car and tells him that she can take him to its real owner, a five-day drive away in the outback to which JM agrees. BG a child at a service station, instructing her not to trust anyone, after calling the police to pick the girl up.

As the pair journey into the outback, flashbacks reveal their stories. JM became wealthy after a friend gave him the computer password to a major bank. The friend was then killed in a road accident and JM's infatuation with the car is an attempt to fill the emotional void created by his friend's death and the barren life he leads in Tokyo.

Flashbacks reveal BG was sexually assaulted three years earlier by a boxer from a travelling circus, after which BG escaped into the bush where she was protected by wild dingoes. As a child, she was also sexually abused by her grandfather (Nicholas Hope) – who is actually her blood father – and traumatised by her deeply religious mother (Elise McCredie). Unbeknownst to JM, BG's grandfather is the owner of the car and she is leading JM to him in order to kill the old man.

In the course of their journey, the pair become friends and eventually lovers. BG locates her grandfather and confronts him, but having reconciled her past during the trip and found someone who genuinely cares for her, she decides not to kill him. The film ends with BG and JM travelling off together in the Citroën, both having come to terms with their past.

== Cast ==
- Rose Byrne as BG (Blind Girl)
- Rikiya Kurokawa as JM (Japanese Man)
- Elise McCredie as Marie
- Nicholas Hope as Grandpa
- Tina Bursill as Esther
- Tim Richards as Drummer Boy

== Production details ==
The budget for the film was around AUD$3m. The film was shot in Tokyo and in and around Lightning Ridge in New South Wales, Australia in late 1999.

The song from the dance scene between BG and JM is "Walk-Don't Run" (the 1964 version) by The Ventures. The song is not included on the film's soundtrack, which contains the score by Jen Anderson.

== Box office ==
The Goddess of 1967 grossed $103,449 at the box office in Australia.

== Awards ==
| Award | Category | Result | Ref. |
|---|---|---|---|
| Art Film Festival | Golden Key – Art Fiction Best Direction | Won | |
| Chicago International Film Festival | Silver Hugo Award for Best Director | Won | |
| Tromsø International Film Festival | FIPRESCI Prize | Won | |
| Venice Film Festival | Volpi Cup – Best Actress | Won | |
| Venice Film Festival | Golden Lion | Nominated | |
| Film Critics Circle of Australia Awards | Best Actor – Female | Nominated | |
| Film Critics Circle of Australia Awards | Best Cinematography | Nominated | |

== See also ==
- Cold Fever – a 1995 film in which a successful Japanese man travels to Iceland in a newly purchased bright red Citroën DS and meets strange characters.
- My Blueberry Nights – a 2007 film in which a woman drifts throughout America to buy a car she had always wanted, which her companion uses on a road trip to confront her father.
