= 33rd Golden Horse Awards =

Award ceremony for Chinese-language films of 1995 and 1996

- Date: December 13, 1996
- Site: Kaohsiung Cultural Center, Kaohsiung, Taiwan
- Hosted by: Woo Gwa and Cally Kwong
- Organized by: Taipei Golden Horse Film Festival Executive Committee

Highlights
- Best Feature Film: In the Heat of the Sun
- Best Director: Jiang Wen; In the Heat of the Sun
- Best Actor: Xia Yu; In the Heat of the Sun
- Best Actress: Josephine Siao; Hu-Du-Men
- Most awards: In the Heat of the Sun (6)
- Most nominations: Floating Life (9)

Television in Taiwan
- Channel: CTS; Star Chinese Movies

The 33rd Golden Horse Awards (Mandarin:第33屆金馬獎) took place on December 13, 1996, at the Kaohsiung Cultural Center in Kaohsiung, Taiwan.

== Winners and nominees ==
Winners are listed first and highlighted in boldface.

**Best Feature Film**: **In the Heat of the Sun**; Floating Life; Tonight Nobody Goes Home; Foreign Moon; The Age of Miracles	**Best Short Film**: **The Prince of the West Gate District**; The Lost Camera; The Meal; Where Is My Love
**Best Animation**: **Excessive for Beauty**
**Best Director**: **Jiang Wen — In the Heat of the Sun**; Derek Yee and Law Chi-leung — Viva Erotica; Wang Toon — Red Persimmon; Clara Law — Floating Life	**Best Leading Actor**: **Xia Yu — In the Heat of the Sun**; Liu Linian — Foreign Moon; Leslie Cheung — Temptress Moon; Michael Wong — First Option
**Best Leading Actress**: **Josephine Siao — Hu-Du-Men**; Tao Shu — Red Persimmon; Ning Jing — In the Heat of the Sun; Sandra Ng — 4 Faces Of Eve	**Best Supporting Actor**: **Wang Chi-tsan — Mahjong**; Jordan Chan — Tonight Nobody Goes Home; Doze Niu — Accidential Legend
**Best Supporting Actress**: **Qiu Xiumin — Ah-Chung**; Cecilia Lee — Floating Life; Annie Liu On-lai — Floating Life; Shu Qi — Viva Erotica
