= Thomas in Love =

2000 film directed by Pierre-Paul Renders

- French theatrical release poster
- Directed by: Pierre-Paul Renders
- Written by: Philippe Blasband
- Produced by: Diana Elbaum
- Cinematography: Virginie Saint-Martin
- Edited by: Ewin Ryckaert
- Music by: Igor Sterpin
- Release dates: 3 September 2000 (Venice); 31 January 2001 (Belgian); 20 June 2001 (France)
- Running time: 97 minutes
- Countries: Belgium; France
- Language: French

Thomas in Love (French: Thomas est amoureux) is a 2000 comedy-drama film directed by Pierre-Paul Renders and written by Philippe Blasband. The film premiered at the 57th Venice International Film Festival, winning the FIPRESCI Award for Best First Feature Film.

It received the Méliès d'Or for Best European Fantastic Film.
