= At the End of the Night (miniseries) =

2024 Iranian miniseries

- Persian: در انتهای شب
- Genre: Drama; Romance
- Created by: Ida Panahandeh; Arsalan Amiri
- Written by: Ida Panahandeh; Arsalan Amiri
- Directed by: Ida Panahandeh
- Starring: Hoda Zeinolabedin; Parsa Pirouzfar
- Composer: Ramin Kousha
- Country of origin: Iran
- Original language: Persian
- No. of seasons: 1
- No. of episodes: 9

Production
- Producer: Mohammad Yamini
- Cinematography: Farshad Mohammadi
- Editor: Emad Khodabakhsh
- Running time: 52–65 minutes

Original release
- Network: FILMNET
- Release: 24 May – 19 July 2024

At the End of the Night (Persian: در انتهای شب, romanized: Dar Ente-haye Shab) is a 2024 Iranian drama romance television miniseries written by Ida Panahandeh and Arsalan Amiri, directed by Panahandeh, and starring Hoda Zeinolabedin and Parsa Pirouzfar. The series premiered on Filmnet every Friday from May 24 to July 19, 2024.

== Cast ==
- Hoda Zeinolabedin as Mahrokh Zarbaf
- Parsa Pirouzfar as Behnam Afshar
- Rayan Sarlak as Dara Afshar
- Sahar Goldoost as Sorayah
- Pedram Sharifi as Reza Bozorgmahr
- Alireza Davoodnezhad as Mina and Mahrokh's father
- Nasrin Nosrati as Hakimeh
- Pouria Rahimisam as Amir Shamsabadi
- Reza Behboudi as Safa
- Elham Shafiei as Mina Zarbaf
- Ehteram Boroumand as Behnam's mother
- Siamak Safari
- Kazem Hajirazad
- Mohammad Heidari as Pedram
- Nahid Moslemi as Azam Eshaghi

== Reception ==
=== Awards and nominations ===
Award	Year	Category	Recipient	Result	Ref(s)
Hafez Awards	2024	Best Actor – Television Series Drama	Parsa Pirouzfar	Won	
Hafez Awards	2024	Best Actor – Television Series Drama	Alireza Davoodnezhad	Nominated	
Hafez Awards	2024	Best Actress – Television Series Drama	Hoda Zeinolabedin	Nominated	
Hafez Awards	2024	Best Actress – Television Series Drama	Sahar Goldoost	Nominated	
Hafez Awards	2024	Best Director – Television Series	Ida Panahandeh	Nominated	
Hafez Awards	2024	Best Screenplay – Television Series	Ida Panahandeh, Arsalan Amiri	Won	
Hafez Awards	2024	Best Television Series	Mohammad Yamini	Won	
Hafez Awards	2024	Best Technical and Artistic Achievement	Farshad Mohammadi	Nominated	
Hafez Awards	2024	Best Technical and Artistic Achievement	Farid Nazerfasihi	Nominated	
