= Freedom (2000 film) =

- Directed by: Šarūnas Bartas
- Written by: Šarūnas Bartas
- Produced by: Šarūnas Bartas; Paulo Branco
- Cinematography: Šarūnas Bartas; Rimvydas Leipus
- Edited by: Mingailė Murmulaitienė
- Music by: Kipras Masanauskas
- Release date: 6 September 2000 (Venice)
- Running time: 94 minutes
- Countries: Lithuania; France; Portugal
- Language: French

Freedom (Lithuanian: Laisvė) is a 2000 drama film directed by Šarūnas Bartas. It tells the story of two men and a woman who are stranded in the Moroccan desert after a failed smuggling trip. The film was a co-production between companies in Lithuania, France and Portugal. It premiered in competition at the 57th Venice International Film Festival.

== Cast ==
- Valentinas Masalskis as the man
- Fatima Ennaflaoui as the girl
- Axel Neumann as the other

== Reception ==
Michael Atkinson wrote in The Village Voice: "Freedom (2000) is Bartas reasserting his perspective in what begins as an almost fully contextualized adventure story: two men and a woman stranded in the Moroccan desert after a smuggling trip goes awry (that single, distantly observed scene, with the coast patrol boat firing away while both boats nearly capsize in rough seas, is one of Bartas's most breathtaking). Speech is a useless recourse in this dangerously gorgeous terrain, and the starving characters join us in simply killing time before the earth swallows them. That may be Bartas's essential idea: The waiting is the hardest part."
