= Kambuzia Partovi =

Iranian film director and screenwriter (1955–2020)

- کامبوزیا پرتوی
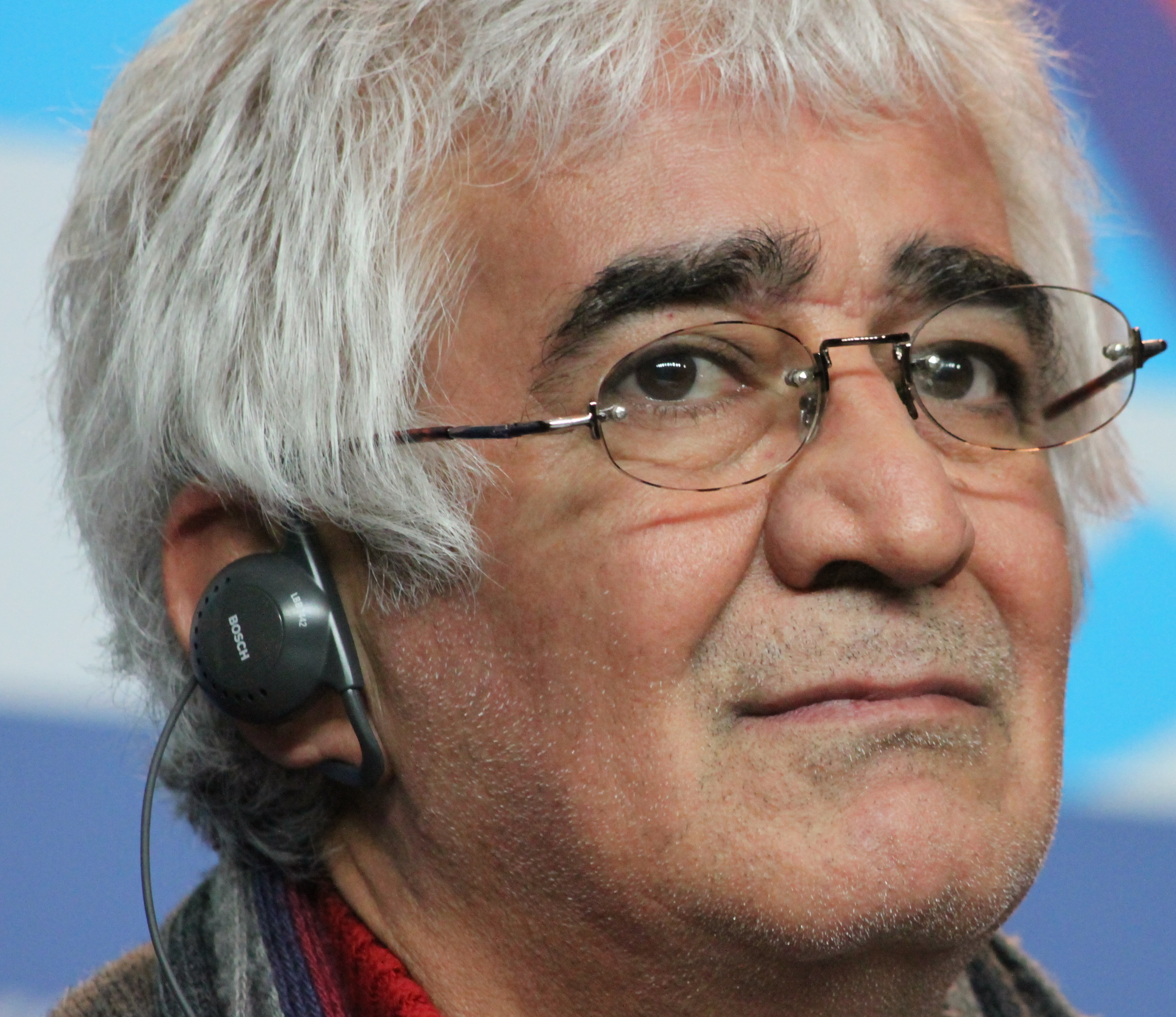
- Partovi in Berlin, Germany, February 2013
- Born: 11 November 1955; Rasht, Iran
- Died: 24 November 2020 (aged 65); Tehran, Iran
- Resting place: Behesht-e Zahra Cemetery
- Occupations: Film director, screenwriter, actor
- Years active: 1988–2020
- Known for: Café Transit
- Spouses: Fereshteh Sadre Orafaee (m. 1980; div. 2011) Nasrin Moradi (m. 2017)
- Awards: UNICEF Award (1989); FIPRESCI Prize (2006)

Kambuzia Partovi (also spelt Kambozia Partovi, Persian: کامبوزیا پرتوی; 11 November 1955 – 24 November 2020) was an Iranian film director and screenwriter.

== Biography ==
He was born in Rasht, Iran, on the Caspian Sea. After studying theater arts in school he wrote mainly scripts for TV series.

In 1988 he made his feature film debut with Golnar. His 2007 film Café Transit, which received the special mention at Mar del Plata film festival, was selected by Iran as its candidate for the Academy Award for Best Foreign Language Film.

He wrote screenplays for other directors, most notably Jafar Panahi's The Circle. In 2013 he acted in and co-directed Closed Curtain with Panahi. Partovi trained and supported many Iranian artists and film makers, most notably Bahman Ghobadi.

He died on 24 November 2020, of complications from COVID-19.

== Filmography ==
=== Director ===
- 1988 Golnar
- 1990 The Singer Cat
- 1991 The Fish
- 1992 The Adult Game
- 1994 The Legend of Two Sisters
- 1997 Naneh Lala va farzandanash
- 2005 Café Transit
- 2013 Closed Curtain (co-directed with Jafar Panahi)

=== Screenwriter ===
- 2000 The Circle
- 2015 Muhammad (together with Majid Majidi)

== Awards and honors ==
- UNICEF Award (1989)
- FIPRESCI Prize (2006)
- Special Mention at Mar del Plata Film Festival (2006)

== See also ==
- Persian cinema
