= Clara Law =

Hong Kong Second Wave film director

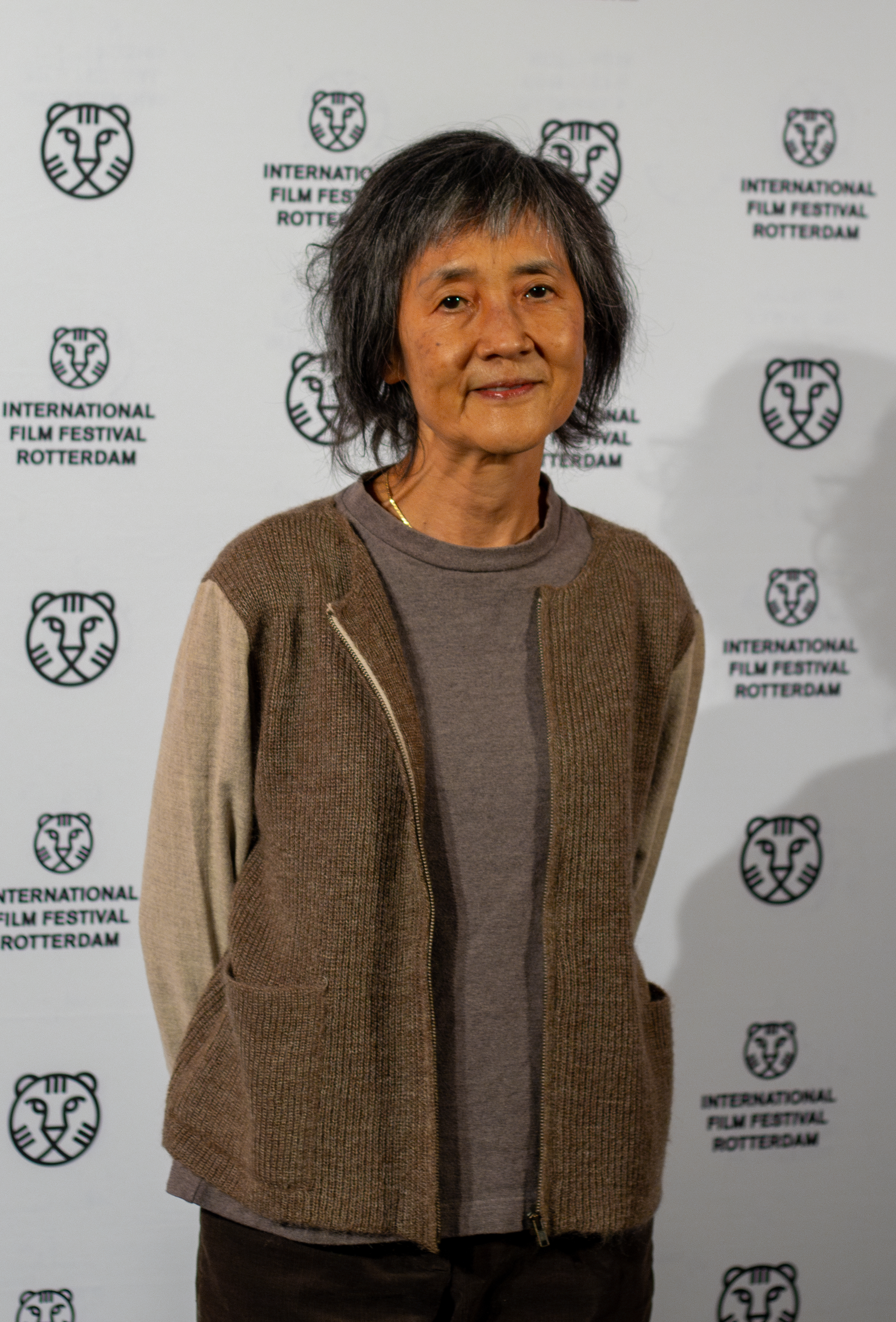
- Law at the IFFR 2026
- Born: 29 May 1957 (age 69); Macau
- Occupation: Film director
- Known for: Autumn Moon (1992); Floating Life (1996); The Goddess of 1967 (2000)

Clara Law Cheuk-yiu (traditional Chinese: 羅卓瑤; simplified Chinese: 罗卓瑶; pinyin: Luó Zhuóyáo; Jyutping: lo4 coek3 jiu4; born 29 May 1957) is a Hong Kong Second Wave film director who moved to Australia with her partner and fellow filmmaker Eddie Fong. She is known for such films as Floating Life and Autumn Moon.

== Early life and education ==
Clara Law was born on 29 May 1957 in Macau. At the age of 10 she moved to Hong Kong.

Law studied at the University of Hong Kong and graduated with a degree in English Literature.

After a period of working in television in Hong Kong, in 1982 Law began studying film direction and writing at the National Film and Television School in England. She won the Silver Plaque Award at the Chicago International Film Festival in 1985 for her graduation film They Say the Moon is Fuller Here.

== Career ==
=== Early career ===
In 1978, Law joined Radio Television Hong Kong as an assistant producer and director. During her time there she tried many aspects of television, from screenwriting to directing. Between 1978 and 1981, she directed 12 drama programs for the television channel.

=== 1985–1994 ===
In 1985, she returned to Hong Kong and began development on her first long feature film The Other Half and the Other Half, which was released in 1988. She then started working with Eddie Fong on all of her projects.

In 1989, she created her second film, The Reincarnation of Golden Lotus. The film was screened at the Toronto Film Festival and was released commercially in the US. A year later, she created Farewell China and was nominated for the Golden Horse Award for Best Director and the Hong Kong Film Award for Best Director. She directed Fruit Punch in 1991, which was a commercial film produced by a large Hong Kong film studio. In 1992, she directed and produced Autumn Moon, which won the Golden Leopard at the Locarno Film Festival in 1992, as well as the European Art Theatres Association Best Picture Award and the Youth Special Jury Award in Switzerland and the Best Screenplay in Valencia (1994). It was also awarded at the Belgium and Portugal film festivals.

In 1993, she released Temptation of a Monk, an adaptation of a novella by Lillian Lee. The film was shot entirely on location in the north and northwestern part of China. It was selected for competition at the 50th Venice International Film Festival, and the Grand Prix at the Créteil International Women's Film Festival in France in 1994. The film was also selected for official screenings at the Toronto, Sundance, Rotterdam, and Brisbane film festivals, and as the closing film at the L.A. Film Festival.

In 1994, Law finished a segment of the movie Erotique called "Wonton Soup". Later that year, she and Eddie Fong moved to Australia.

=== 1994–present ===
Law moved to Australia with her partner Eddie Fong in 1994. The couple's first film after their move to Australia is Floating Life, which was completed in 1996. The film won the Silver Leopard Award at the Locarno Film Festival in 1996. It also won the Grand Prix Asturias and Best Director at the Gijón International Film Festival in Spain, and the Grand Prix at the Créteil International Women's Film Festival in France. It received three nominations at the Australian Film Institute Awards, including Best Achievement in Direction and Best Original Screenplay, as well as nine nominations at the Taipei Golden Horse Awards, including Best Feature Film, Best Director and Best Original Screenplay. Floating Life was also Australia's official entry for Best Foreign Language Film at the 69th Academy Awards (1997). The film was also screened at the Sydney, Melbourne, London, Rotterdam, Hof, Stockholm, Toronto, and Hawaii film festivals.

The Goddess of 1967, shot on location in the outback of Australia and Tokyo, Japan, was completed in 2000. It was in competition at the Venice Film Festival in 2000, where Rose Byrne won the Best Actress Award and Law nominated for the Golden Lion, the highest award at the festival. It won Best Director Awards at the Chicago International Film Festival and Teplice Art Film Festival in Slovakia, and the FIPRESCI Critics' Award for Best Film at the Tromsø Film Festival in Norway. The film was also selected for official screenings at many other film festivals.

She directed her first digital documentary in 2004 called Letters to Ali with Eddie Fong, who co-produced, edited, and shot the film. The film was selected for competition at the Venice Film Festival and for official screenings at the Toronto, Pusan, Gothenburg, and Melbourne film festivals.

She completed Like a Dream in 2009, which marked her return to Asia. The film received nine nominations at the 46th Golden Horse Awards. It also opened the 2010 Hong Kong International Film Festival.

In 2010, Law made a short film, Red Earth, commissioned by the Hong Kong International Film Festival. The short was selected in the Orizzonti section at the 67th Venice International Film Festival.

The Little Qipao Shop, directed by Law and Fong, and produced by Sue Maslin and Charlotte Seymour, was under development in 2023.

== Themes ==
Law's films explore themes surrounding migration and exile, including loyalty, family, love, and nostalgia. She has used a variety of visual and narrative styles throughout her oeuvre to interrogate cultural dislocation and its effect on individuals and communities.

== Filmography ==
Year	Title	Notes/Ref.
2020	Drifting Petals	
2015	The Unbearable Lightness of Inspector Fan	Also known as Shanghai Noir
2010	Red Earth	Short Film
2009	Like a Dream	
2004	Letters to Ali	Documentary
2000	The Goddess of 1967	
1996	Floating Life	
1994	Wonton Soup	
1993	Temptation of a Monk	
1992	Autumn Moon	
1991	Fruit Punch	
1990	Farewell China	
1989	The Reincarnation of the Golden Lotus	
1988	The Other Half and the Other Half	
1981	Faces and Places	
1980	Police Drama	
1977	Below the Lion Rock	

== Awards and nominations ==
Award	Year	Category	Work	Result	Ref.
International Film Festival Rotterdam	2022	Big Screen Competition	Drifting Petals	Nominated	
Taipei Golden Horse Awards	2021	Best Director	Drifting Petals	Won	
Taipei Golden Horse Awards	2009	Best Narrative Feature	Like a Dream	Nominated	
Taipei Golden Horse Awards	2009	Best Director	Like a Dream	Nominated	
Taipei Golden Horse Awards	2009	Best Original Screenplay	Like a Dream	Nominated	
Tromsø International Film Festival	2001	FIPRESCI Prize	The Goddess of 1967	Won	
IFF Art Film	2001	Golden Key for Best Direction	The Goddess of 1967	Won	
Venice Film Festival	2000	Golden Lion	The Goddess of 1967	Nominated	
Chicago International Film Festival	2000	Silver Hugo for Best Director	The Goddess of 1967	Won	
Créteil International Women's Film Festival	1997	Grand Prix	Floating Life	Won	
Taipei Golden Horse Awards	1996	Best Director	Floating Life	Nominated	
Taipei Golden Horse Awards	1996	Best Original Screenplay	Floating Life	Nominated	
Gijón International Film Festival	1996	Grand Prix Asturias	Floating Life	Won	
Gijón International Film Festival	1996	Best Director	Floating Life	Won	
Australian Film Institute Awards	1996	Best Achievement in Direction	Floating Life	Nominated	
Australian Film Institute Awards	1996	Best Original Screenplay	Floating Life	Nominated	
Locarno Film Festival	1996	Silver Leopard	Floating Life	Won	
Hong Kong Film Awards	1994	Best Director	Temptation of a Monk	Nominated	
Créteil International Women's Film Festival	1994	Grand Prix	Temptation of a Monk	Won	
Venice Film Festival	1993	Golden Lion	Temptation of a Monk	Nominated	
Taipei Golden Horse Awards	1993	Best Director	Autumn Moon	Nominated	
Locarno Film Festival	1992	Golden Leopard	Autumn Moon	Won	
Locarno Film Festival	1992	Youth Jury "The environment is the quality of life" Prize	Autumn Moon	Won	
Locarno Film Festival	1992	CICAE Jury Prize	Autumn Moon	Won	
Hong Kong Film Awards	1991	Best Director	Farewell China	Nominated	
Taipei Golden Horse Awards	1990	Best Director	Farewell China	Nominated	
Chicago International Film Festival	1985	Silver Plaque	They Say the Moon Is Fuller Here	Won	

== See also ==
- List of graduates of University of Hong Kong
