= Ida Panahandeh =

Iranian director, screenwriter and producer (born 1979)

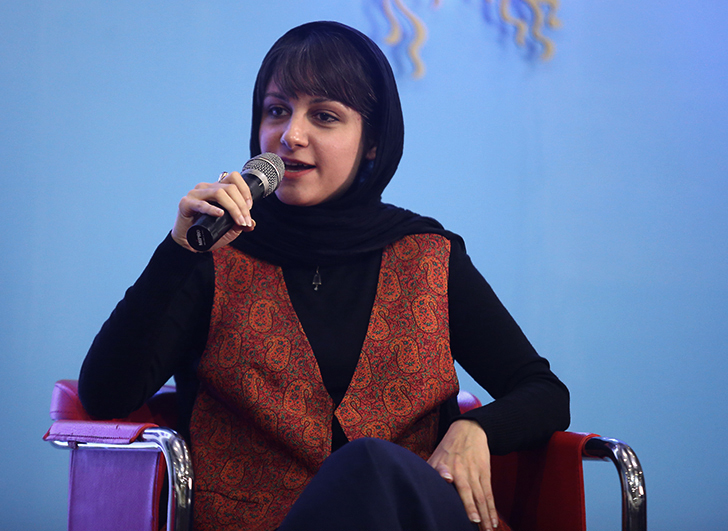
- Panahandeh in 2016
- Born: September 8, 1979 (age 47); Tehran, Iran
- Education: University of Tehran
- Occupations: Director; screenwriter; producer
- Years active: 1998–present
- Spouse: Arsalan Amiri

Ida Panahandeh (Persian: آیدا پناهنده; born September 8, 1979) is an Iranian director, screenwriter and producer. She is best known for her films Nahid (2015), Titi (2020), and television miniseries At the End of the Night (2024).

== Early life ==
Ida Panahandeh was born on September 8, 1979, in Tehran, Iran. She is originally an Iranian Azerbaijani.

== Filmography ==
=== Film ===
Year	Title	Credited as			Notes	Ref(s)
Year	Title	Director	Screenwriter	Producer	Notes	Ref(s)
2015	Nahid	Yes	Yes	No		
2017	Israfil	Yes	Yes	No		
2018	The Nikaidos' Fall	Yes	Yes	No	Japanese production	
2020	Titi	Yes	Yes	Yes		
2021	Zalava	No	Yes	No		
TBA	Janava	No	Yes	Yes		

=== Web ===
Year	Title	Credited as			Platform	Notes	Ref(s)
Year	Title	Director	Screenwriter	Producer	Platform	Notes	Ref(s)
2024	At the End of the Night	Yes	Yes	No	Filmnet	Miniseries; also as actress, 1 episode	
2026	The Red and the Black	Yes	Yes	No	Filimo	Miniseries	
