= Floating Life =

- Video tape cover
- Chinese: 浮生
- Literal meaning: floating life
- Hanyu Pinyin: fú shēng
- Jyutping: fau4 saang1
- Directed by: Clara Law
- Written by: Eddie Ling-Ching Fong; Clara Law
- Produced by: Bridget Ikin
- Starring: Annette Shun Wah; Annie Yip; Anthony Wong
- Cinematography: Dion Beebe
- Edited by: Suresh Ayyar
- Music by: Davood A. Tabrizi
- Distributed by: Footprint Films
- Release date: 7 June 1996 (Sydney Film Festival)
- Running time: 95 minutes
- Country: Australia
- Languages: English; German; Cantonese

Floating Life is a 1996 Australian drama film directed by Clara Law about a Hong Kong family who move to Australia. The film was selected as the Australian entry for the Best Foreign Language Film at the 69th Academy Awards, but was not accepted as a nominee.

== Cast ==
- Annette Shun Wah as Yen Chan
- Annie Yip as Bing Chan
- Anthony Wong as Gar Ming
- Edwin Pang as Mr. Chan
- Cecilia Fong Sing Lee as Mrs. Chan
- Toby Wong as Yue
- Toby Chan as Chau
- Julian Pulvermacher as Michael, Yen's husband
- Bruce Poon as Cheung, Bing's husband
- Celia Ireland
- Darren Yap
- Nina Liu as Apple

== Awards ==
- 1996: Locarno International Film Festival Silver Leopard (Clara Law)
- 1996: Golden Horse Film Festival Golden Horse Award (Best Original Score: Davood A. Tabrizi)
- 1996: Gijón International Film Festival Best Director (Clara Law)
- 1996: Gijón International Film Festival Grand Prix Asturias (Best Feature: Clara Law)
- 1997: Créteil International Women's Film Festival Grand Prix (Clara Law)

== Availability ==
The film was released on videocassette by Cineplex Odeon and Universal in Canada. The film was released on DVD in 2006 by Kanopy for limited Australian institutional use.

== Box office ==
Floating Life grossed $141,398 at the box office in Australia.

== See also ==
- Cinema of Australia
- List of submissions to the 69th Academy Awards for Best Foreign Language Film
- List of Australian submissions for the Academy Award for Best Foreign Language Film
