= Pierre-Paul Renders =

Belgian film director

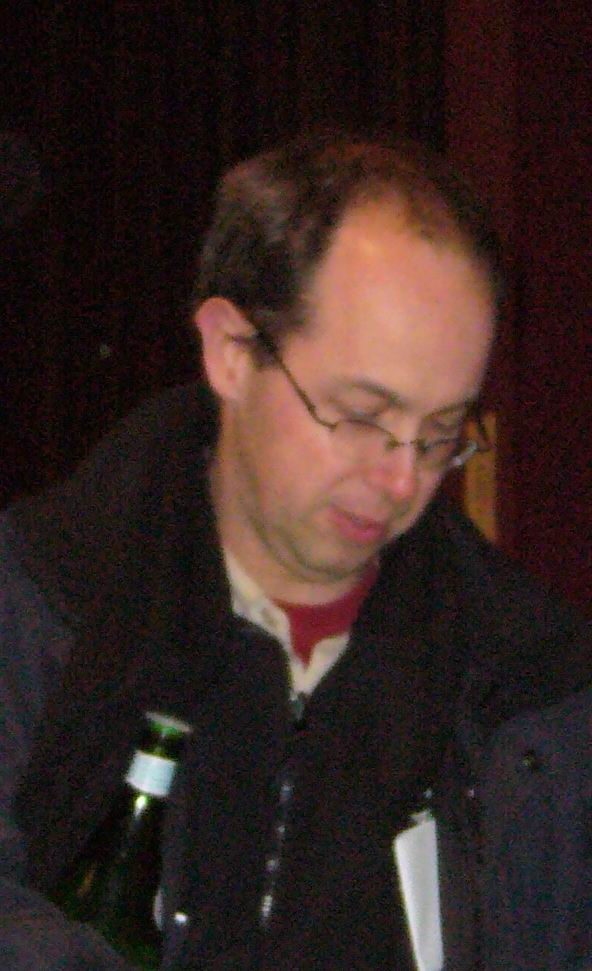
- Born: 17 July 1963 (age 62); Brussels, Belgium
- Occupations: Film director, screenwriter
- Years active: 1992-present

Pierre-Paul Renders (born 17 July 1963) is a Belgian film director and screenwriter. He has directed three films since 1992. His 2006 film Mr. Average was entered into the 28th Moscow International Film Festival.

== Selected filmography ==
- Thomas est amoureux (2001)
- Mr. Average (2006)
