= Café Transit =

- Film poster
- Directed by: Kambuzia Partovi
- Written by: Kambuzia Partovi
- Produced by: Amir Samavati; Behrouz Hashemian; Setareh Farsi
- Starring: Parviz Parastui; Fereshteh Sadre Orafaee; Nikos Papadopoulos
- Cinematography: Mohammad Reza Sokout
- Edited by: Reza Mirkarimi
- Music by: Jafar Panahi
- Release date: 2005
- Country: Iran
- Language: Persian

Café Transit (Persian: کافه ترانزیت; in USA known as Border Cafe) is a 2005 Iranian film directed by Kambuzia Partovi. It was Iran's submission to the 79th Academy Awards for the Academy Award for Best Foreign Language Film, but was not nominated for the award. It was awarded best film in the 9th Dhaka International Film Festival.
