= Fatemeh Naghavi =

Iranian actress (born 1954)

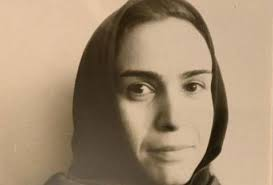

Fatemeh Naghavi (Persian: فاطمه نقوی; born 6 December 1954) is an Iranian actress.

== Career ==
She is known for her film The Circle (2000) in the western world. Her films include Dayereh (2000), Nasl-e sookhte (1999), Mosaferan (1992), Do film ba yek belit (1990), Gonge Khab Dideh (The Mute Dream) (2002) (directed by her husband, noted Iranian director Attila Pessyani), and Devil's Ship (2008).

== Personal life ==
Naghavi was married to actor Atila Pesyani, with whom she has two children: Setareh and Khosro.
