= 2026 BFI London Film Festival =

Annual Film Festival in London

70th BFI London Film Festival
- LFF Poster
- Opening film: Elsinore by Simon Stone
- Closing film: The Debut by Jesse Eisenberg
- Location: London, United Kingdom
- Founded: 1957
- Awards: Sutherland Trophy: 9 Temples to Heaven
- Hosted by: British Film Institute
- Artistic director: Kristy Matheson
- Festival date: 7–18 October 2026
- Website: BFI

BFI London Film Festival
- 2027 2025

The 70th BFI London Film Festival took place from 7 to 18 October 2026. The opening night gala on 7 October was Elsinore by Simon Stone, a biographical drama film about Scottish actor Ian Charleson, marking its European premiere. The opening marked the beginning of ten days of film events in London, featuring premiere screenings of films such as Artificial, Bunker, Behemoth!, Ink, Club Kid, A Long Winter, Wild Horse Nine, Ray Gunn, and Paper Tiger at the Royal Festival Hall in Southbank.

The awards were announced on 18 November. A Germany, Italy, France, and Lithuania co-production non-narrative documentary film Imperium by Sergei Loznitsa won the Best Film in competition, whereas Thai drama film 9 Temples to Heaven by Sompot Chidgasornpongse won Sutherland Award for Best First Feature. The closing night gala was American musical comedy film The Debut by Jesse Eisenberg making its United Kingdom premiere at the Royal Festival Hall on October 18.

== Festival overview ==
The complete line-up was revealed on 2 September 2026. On 7 September, 6 more films were added to Thematic Strands: Chris Rock's Misty Green and Elizabeth Chai Vasarhelyi and Jimmy Chin directed documentary Everest: The Other Side in the 'Journey', Jonathan Glazer's Joy of Joys and Cameron Winter at Carnegie Hall in the 'Create' and Banjong Pisanthanakun's Inherit in the 'Cult' whereas Primetime by Lance Oppenheim in 'Thrill' strands. Sam Pollard, American film director, editor, producer, and screenwriter served as jury president of the main competition.

== Screening venues ==
Seven London venues screened the films during the festival's run:

- BFI IMAX
- BFI Southbank
- Curzon Soho
- Institute of Contemporary Arts
- Prince Charles Cinema
- Royal Festival Hall
- Vue West End

Some of the films, including the opening and closing night galas, were also screened outside London at the following venues:

- Broadway Cinema, Nottingham
- Chapter Arts Centre, Cardiff
- Glasgow Film Theatre
- Edinburgh Filmhouse
- HOME, Manchester
- Midlands Art Centre, Birmingham
- Queen's Film Theatre, Belfast
- Showroom Cinema, Sheffield
- Tyneside Cinema, Newcastle upon Tyne
- Watershed, Bristol

== Juries ==
The jury members were as follows:

=== Main Competition ===
Main competition jury selected the winner of the best film award.

- Sam Pollard, American film director, editor, producer, and screenwriter – Jury president

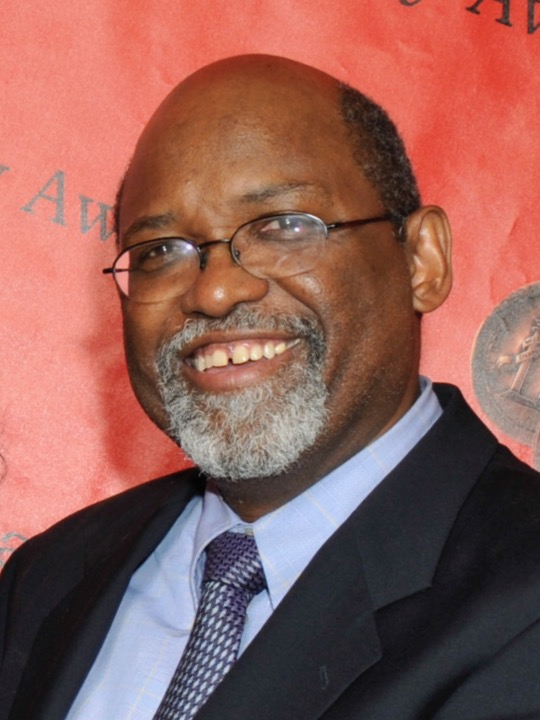
Sam Pollard, Jury President, Main Competition

- Mariano Llinás, Argentine filmmaker and writer
- Julie La Bassiere, chief strategy officer at Global communications agency DDA

=== First Feature Competition (Sutherland Award) ===
- Amir El-Masry, British-Egyptian actor and producer – Jury president
- Alemberg Ang, Filipino independent film producer and former schoolteacher
- Rosa Bosch, an international film sales, distribution, and awards strategy executive and AMPAS member

=== Documentary Competition (Grierson Award) ===
- Sandhya Suri, British-Indian film director and documentarian – Jury president
- Kate Fitzpatrick, Australian television, film, and theatre actress. Senior programmer at Melbourne International Film Festival
- Andee Ryder, a BAFTA and Emmy Award-winning film producer

=== Short Film Competition ===
- Helen Simmons, producer, writer and Erebus Pictures co-founder – Jury president
- Leo Reich, British comedian and actor and writer. New York Times Critics’ Pick and Sky Arts breakthrough award nominee
- Jack Casey, script editor, story consultant and executive producer

== Screen Talk ==
This year’s Screen Talks lineup includes:

- Andrew Scott, Irish actor
- Ava DuVernay, American filmmaker
- Brad Bird, American filmmaker, animator, and voice actor
- Cynthia Erivo, British actress and singer
- James Gray, American filmmaker producer, and screenwriter
- Jesse Eisenberg, American actor, playwright, and filmmaker
- John Malkovich, American actor
- Mahershala Ali, American actor
- Naomi Ackie, English actress
- Sofia Coppola, American filmmaker and former actress
- Danny Boyle, English director and producer
- Robert Eggers, American filmmaker
- Javier Bardem, Spanish actor

== Headline Galas ==
The Debut will close the festival, and Artificial to have Gala screening on October 11.

English Title	Original Title	Director(s)	Production Country
Opening Night Gala
Elsinore		Simon Stone	United Kingdom, United States, Italy
Closing Night Gala
The Debut		Jesse Eisenberg	United States
BFI Patron's Gala
Behemoth!		Tony Gilroy	United States
Mayor of London's Gala
Ink		Danny Boyle	United Kingdom
Gala
Artificial		Luca Guadagnino	United States, United Kingdom, Italy
Being Heumann		Siân Heder	United States
The Beloved	El ser querido	Rodrigo Sorogoyen	Spain
La bola negra		Javier Ambrossi, Javier Calvo	Spain, France
Bunker		Florian Zeller	France, Spain
Club Kid		Jordan Firstman	United States
Fatherland		Paweł Pawlikowski	Poland, Germany, Italy, France
Fjord		Cristian Mungiu	Romania, France, Norway, Denmark, Sweden, Finland
I Love Boosters		Boots Riley	United States
I Play Rocky (surprise film)		Peter Farrelly	United States
Klara and the Sun		Taika Waititi	United States, United Kingdom, New Zealand
A Long Winter		Andrew Haigh	United Kingdom, Canada
Minotaur	Минотавр	Andrey Zvyagintsev	France, Germany, Latvia
Paper Tiger		James Gray	United States
Possible Love	가능한 사랑	Lee Chang-dong	South Korea
Prima Facie		Susanna White	United Kingdom, Australia
Ray Gunn		Brad Bird	United States
Tender Loving Care		Mike Leigh	United Kingdom
Wild Horse Nine		Martin McDonagh	United States, United Kingdom, Chile
Wildwood		Travis Knight	United States
Your Mother Your Mother Your Mother		Bassam Tariq	United States, United Kingdom

== Competition ==
The festival’s three competition sections are as follows:

=== Official Competition ===
The official competition lineup includes:

† Indicates award winner.

English Title	Original Title	Director(s)	Production Country
7 Miles Out		Carol Morley	United Kingdom
Act 3		Christine Molloy, Joe Lawlor	Ireland, United Kingdom
Glaxo		Benjamín Naishtat	Brazil, Argentina
Imperium †		Sergei Loznitsa	Germany, France, Italy, Lithuania
Ketticè		Giovanni Tortorici	Italy
Look Back	ルックバック	Hirokazu Koreeda	Japan
My Notes on Mars		Lili Horvát	Hungary, Austria
The Difficult Bride		Rubaiyat Hossain	France, Bangladesh, Portugal, Norway, Germany
The Idiot(s)		Małgorzata Szumowska, Michal Englert	United Kingdom, Poland
Woman Unknown	Kvinde ukendt	May el-Toukhy	Denmark, Latvia, Sweden

=== First Feature Competition ===
The following films competed for the Sutherland Award, which is awarded to a directorial debut:

† Indicates award winner.

English Title	Original Title	Director(s)	Production Country
9 Temples to Heaven †	9 วัด สู่สวรรค์	Sompot Chidgasornpongse	Thailand, Singapore, France, Norway, China, Hong Kong, Indonesia, Qatar
Animol		Ashley Walters	United Kingdom
Ben'Imana		Marie Clémentine Dusabejambo	Rwanda, Gabon, France, Norway, Ivory Coast
A Common Story	Una storia	Anna Foglietta	Italy
Forest High	Forêt Ivre	Manon Coubia	Belgium, France
Fruit Gathering	သစ်သီးခူး	Aung Phyoe	Myanmar, Czech Republic, France
LADY		Olive Nwosu	United Kingdom, Nigeria
The Last Day		Rachel Rose	United States
Masc		Bertil Nilsson	United Kingdom
Our Share of Sand		Shalini Adnani	United Kingdom, India, Greece

=== Documentary Competition ===
The following films will compete for the Grierson Awards, which is awarded to the Best Documentary of the competition.

† Indicates award winner.

English Title	Original Title	Director(s)	Production Country
Ba's Book		Ashley Duong	Canada
The Calf Doll		Ankur Hooda	India
Concrete Land †		Asmahan Bkerat	Jordan, Palestine
Concrete Turned to Sand		Jessica Johnson, Ryan Ermacora	Canada
Dependence		Grace Harper Brighouse	Canada
Once Upon a Time in Harlem		William Greaves, David Greaves	United States
Queer Edward II		Theo Rollason	United Kingdom
Sumo: Spirit Weighs Nothing		Erik Shirai	Japan, United States, Denmark, United Kingdom

=== Short Films Competition ===
The following films will compete for the Short Film award.

† Indicates award winner.

English Title	Original Title	Director(s)	Production Country
Aman †		Rahul Roye	India, United Kingdom, United States, France
Daughters of the Late Colonel		Elizabeth Hobbs	United Kingdom, Germany
FarEye		Hayden Mclean	United Kingdom
How To Hide It		Ramla Ali, Richard A. Moore	United Kingdom
Into the Forest	Vers la forêt	Antonin Niclass	Switzerland
A Kind of Purity		Theo Shivdasani	United Kingdom
Landscapes of Shame		Patrick Hough	Ireland-United Kingdom
Mon Taxi		Meriem Sakrouhi	Morocco, United States
Treasure Island	L'île aux trésors	Miryam Charles	Canada
White Musk		Fatima Wardy	Sudan, United States

== Thematic strands ==
=== Love ===
English Title	Original Title	Director(s)	Production Country
All of a Sudden	Soudain / 急に具合が悪くなる	Ryusuke Hamaguchi	France, Japan, Germany, Belgium
Coward		Lukas Dhont	Belgium, France, Netherlands
Dao		Alain Gomis	France, Guinea-Bissau, Senegal
Flies	Moscas	Fernando Eimbcke	Mexico
Frank and Percy		Sean Mathias	United Kingdom
Ha-Chan, Shake Your Booty!		Josef Kubota Wladyka	United States
House of the Wind		Bernard Auguste Kouemo Yanghu	Cameroon
In A Whisper	À voix basse	Leyla Bouzid	France
It Will Happen Tonight	Succederà questa notte	Nanni Moretti	Italy
Iván & Hadoum		Ian de la Rosa	Spain
Lemonade		Kim Bartley	Ireland
Mouse		Kelly O'Sullivan	United States
Pakeezah	पाक़ीज़ा	Kamal Amrohi	India
Petrolheads		Emil Langballe	Denmark
The Slightest Touch		Rachel Fleit	Ireland, United States
To Hold a Mountain	Planina	Biljana Tutorov, Petar Glomazić	Serbia
Variations on a Theme!		Devon Delmar, Jason Jacobs	South Africa

=== Debate ===
English Title	Original Title	Director(s)	Production Country
All About the Money		Sinéad O'Shea	United States, Ireland
Gentle Monster		Marie Kreutzer	Austria, France, Germany
Good Little Soldier	Un bon petit soldat	Stéphane Brizé	France
I See Buildings Fall Like Lightning		Clio Barnard	United Kingdom, France, United States
Musk		Alex Gibney	United Kingdom, United States
My Undesirable Friends: Part II – Exile		Julia Loktev	United States

=== Laugh ===
English Title	Original Title	Director(s)	Production Country
The Banning Curse		Mohsen Amiryousefi, Mohsen Amiryousefi	Iran
The Fox		Dario Russo	Australia
The History of Concrete		John Wilson	United States
Hot Water		Ramzi Bashour	United States
Lali		Sarmad Khoosat	Pakistan
Wicker		Eleanor Wilson, Alex Huston Fischer	United States, United Kingdom

=== Dare ===
English Title	Original Title	Director(s)	Production Country
A Day in the Life of Jo: Chapter Phaedra	Mia mera sti zoi tis tzo: kefalaio Faidra	Jacqueline Lentzou	Greece, Germany, France
Chronicles from the Siege	وقائع زمن الحصار	Abdallah Al-Khatib	Algeria, France, Palestine
Chronovisor		Jack Auen & Kevin Walker	United States
Everytime		Sandra Wollner	Austria, Germany
Filipiñana		Rafael Manuel	Singapore, United Kingdom, Philippines, France, Netherlands
A Man of His Time	Notre Salut	Emmanuel Marre	Belgium, France
Mary Magdalene	Marie Madeleine	Gessica Généus	Haiti, France, Belgium, Luxembourg, Canada
My Wife Cries	Meine Frau weint	Angela Schanelec	Germany, France
Rose		Markus Schleinzer	Austria, Germany

=== Thrill ===
English Title	Original Title	Director(s)	Production Country
Black Church Bay		Rhys Marc Jones	United Kingdom
The Dreamed Adventure	Das Geträumte Abenteuer	Valeska Grisebach	Germany, France, Austria, Bulgaria
Elephants in the Fog	तिनीहरू	Abinash Bikram Shah	Nepal, France, Germany, Brazil, Norway
Furies		Rami Kodeih	Lebanon, Brazil
Josephine		Beth de Araújo	United States
The Liberation		Guy Nattiv	United Kingdom, United States, New Zealand
The Match	El partido	Juan Cabral and Santiago Franco	Argentina
Moonglow		Isabel Sandoval	Philippines
Primetime		Lance Oppenheim	United States

=== Cult ===
English Title	Original Title	Director(s)	Production Country
The Blood Countess	Die Blutgräfin	Ulrike Ottinger	Austria, Luxembourg, Germany
The Devils		Ken Russell	United States, United Kingdom
The Face of Horror		Anna Biller	United Kingdom
Godzilla Minus Zero	ゴジラ-0.0マイナスゼロ	Takashi Yamazaki	Japan
Hot Spot		Agnieszka Smoczyńska	Poland, Greece, Sweden, Norway
Inherit	คุณยายวรนาฏ	Banjong Pisanthanakun	Thailand
Nightborn	Yön Lapsi	Hanna Bergholm	Finland, France, Lithuania, United Kingdom
Rogue Trooper		Duncan Jones	United Kingdom
The Unknown	L'Inconnue	Arthur Harari	France, Italy

=== Journey ===
English Title	Original Title	Director(s)	Production Country
Ana, en passant		Fernanda Salgado	Brazil, Portugal, France
A Bit of Light	کمی نور	Ali Asgari	Iran, Switzerland, Italy, Canada, Turkey
Clarissa		Arie Esiri and Chuko Esiri	United States, Nigeria, Egypt
Everest: The Other Side		Elizabeth Chai Vasarhelyi and Jimmy Chin	United States, China, Nepal
La Gradiva		Marine Atlan	France, Italy
Misty Green		Chris Rock	United States
No Good Men	Kabul Jan	Shahrbanoo Sadat	Germany, France, Norway, Denmark, Afghanistan
La Perra		Dominga Sotomayor	Chile, Brazil
A Place to Heal	15/18	Cédric Kahn	France
The Station	Al Mahattah	Sara Ishaq	Yemen, Netherlands, France, Jordan, Germany, Norway

=== Create ===
English Title	Original Title	Director(s)	Production Country
Cameron Winter at Carnegie Hall		Paul Thomas Anderson	United States
Congo Boy		Rafiki Fariala	Central African Republic, France, Democratic Republic of Congo, Italy
The Echo Chamber		Andrea Pallaoro	Italy, Belgium
Joy of Joys		Jonathan Glazer	United Kingdom
The Man I Love		Ira Sachs	United States, France
Supporting Role	მეორეხარისხოვანი როლი	Ana Urushadze	Georgia, Estonia, Türkiye

=== Experimenta ===
English Title	Original Title	Director(s)	Production Country
Fire Flower	Hanabi	Ana Vaz	France, Brazil
Az Zeeb		Rafael Guendelman	Chile, Qatar
Tropical Fractals	Fractais Tropicais	Leonardo Pirondi	Portugal, Brazil

=== Family ===
English Title	Original Title	Director(s)	Production Country
Iron Boy	Le Corset	Louis Clichy	France, Belgium
Julián		Louise Bagnall	Ireland
Koschka		Bernd Sahling	Germany
A Mighty Adventure		Toe Yuen	Golden Network Asia
My Friend the Sun	Mi Amigo El Sol	Alejandra Pérez González	Mexico-Brazil

== Special Presentations ==
English Title	Original Title	Director(s)	Production Country
Archive Special Presentation
Gone to Earth (1950)		Michael Powell and Emeric Pressburger	United Kingdom
Documentary Special Presentation
14th		Ava DuVernay	United States
Experimenta Special Presentation
Shab-nameh: Women of Iran's Forgotten Left (2026)		Maryam Tafakory	United Kingdom, Iran
BFI Flare Special Presentation
Sweet Milk Lake (2026)		Harvey Zielinski	Australia
Series Special Presentation
The Trip to the Northern Lights (Episodes 1-2)		Michael Winterbottom	United Kingdom
Immersive Special Presentation
Water Body (2026)		Marshmallow Laser Feast – Barnaby Steel, Ersin Han Ersin, Robin McNicholas	United Kingdom

== Short films ==
The short film programme was divided into the following sections.

=== Altered States ===
English Title	Original Title	Director(s)	Production Country
Mon Taxi		Meriem Sakrouhi	Morocco, United States
Bundle		Carlo Milillo	United Kingdom
To the North		Amer Nasser	Palestine
Stolen Memories	Stjålne Minner	Anders Davidsen	Norway, Sweden
FarEye		Hayden Mclean	United Kingdom
White Musk		Fatima Wardy	Sudan, United States

=== As the Years Roll By ===
English Title	Original Title	Director(s)	Production Country
Agnes		Leah Vlemmiks	United Kingdom, Canada
All Change		Lena Molander	United Kingdom

=== Call Your Bluff ===
English Title	Original Title	Director(s)	Production Country
How To Hide It		Ramla Ali, Richard A. Moore	United Kingdom
Sweet Bitter Sweet		Nicolee Tsin	United Kingdom
Laundreams		Amber Gadd, Evie Ward-Drummond	United Kingdom
Micro Bangs		Iris Breward	United Kingdom
A Twist of Hate		Maddy Shenai	United Kingdom

=== I See Myself ===
English Title	Original Title	Director(s)	Production Country
The Animals		Calvin Demba	United Kingdom

=== Land of Hope and Gory ===
English Title	Original Title	Director(s)	Production Country
The Sorrows of Young Charlotte		Shir Ariya	United Kingdom

=== Life / Drawing ===
English Title	Original Title	Director(s)	Production Country
Fantasies of a Rescue Dummy		Adrian Maganza	United Kingdom

== Archive ==
English Title	Original Title	Director(s)	Production Country
The Devils (1971)		Ken Russell	United States, United Kingdom
The Drifting (1964)	La Dérive	Paula Delsol	France
Gone to Earth (1950)		Michael Powell and Emeric Pressburger	United Kingdom
Pakeezah (1972)	पाक़ीज़ा	Kamal Amrohi	India
Panelstory (1979)	Panelstory aneb Jak se rodí sídliště	Věra Chytilová	Czechoslovakia

== Awards ==
The following awards were presented:

=== In competition ===
- Best Film: Imperium , by Sergei Loznitsa
- Best First Feature (Sutherland Award for Best First Feature): 9 Temples to Heaven , by Sompot Chidgasornpongse
  - Special Mention: Masc by Bertil Nilsson
- Best Documentary (Grierson Award for Best Documentary): Concrete Land, by Asmahan Bkerat
  - Special Mention: Queer Edward II, by Theo Rollason
- Best Short Film: Aman, by Rahul Roye
  - Special Mention: Daughters of the Late Colonel by Elizabeth Hobbs

=== Audience awards ===
Voting opened on Wednesday 7 October and closed on Wednesday 21 October 2026. The awards were announced on 4 November.

- Best Feature Film: La bola negra by Javier Ambrossi, Javier Calvo
- Best British Discovery: Dependence by Grace Harper-Brighouse
