= Masc (film) =

2026 British drama film

- Directed by: Bertil Nilsson
- Written by: Bertil Nilsson; Joshua Griffin
- Produced by: Bertil Nilsson
- Starring: Joshua Griffin
- Edited by: Anna Meller
- Music by: Daniel Sonabend
- Production company: Duktiga
- Release date: 12 September 2026 (TIFF)
- Running time: 83 minutes
- Country: United Kingdom
- Language: English

Masc is a British drama film, directed by Bertil Nilsson and released in 2026. The film stars Joshua Griffin as Robin, a young autistic queer man who is struggling to find his place in society, and who changes his appearance and mannerisms several times in an attempt to conform to different conceptions of masculinity.

The cast also includes Tega Alexander, Ed White, Reece King, Lincoln Conway, Robbie Bellekom and Hi Ching in supporting roles.

== Distribution ==
The film was selected as part of the Great 8, the British Film Institute's program of films by emerging British directors screened for distributors at the Marché du Film.

The film had its public premiere in the Platform Prize program at the 2026 Toronto International Film Festival. It also competed for the Sutherland Award in the First Feature Competition at the 2026 BFI London Film Festival, where it received a Special Mention.

== Reception ==
=== Accolades ===
Award	Date of ceremony	Category	Recipient(s)	Result	Ref.
Toronto International Film Festival	20 September 2026	Platform Prize	Bertil Nilsson	Nominated	
BFI London Film Festival	18 October 2026	Sutherland Award	Bertil Nilsson	Special Mention	
