= Ken Wlaschin =

American film programmer and author (1934–2009)

Kenneth Glen Wlaschin (July 12, 1934 – November 10, 2009) was an American film programmer, historian of film and music, and author.

== Biography ==
Wlaschin was born in Bradish, Nebraska and went to high school in Scottsbluff, Nebraska. He graduated from Dartmouth College in 1956 with a Bachelor of Arts in English. He moved to Europe for his English literature Master's degree at University College Dublin and later studied French at the University of Poitiers. In 1958 he joined the US Army in the Counterintelligence Corps based in Poitiers.

He moved to Rome and became arts editor and critic for Rome Daily American and wrote a column for the British newspaper the Daily Sketch. While in Italy he appeared in Spaghetti Western The Tramplers (1965), one of two films he appeared in.

In 1968, he moved back to England and worked for London Weekend Television as a drama series editor. In 1969, he became the program director for the National Film Theatre in London and in that role was the longest-serving director of the London Film Festival, running the festival from its 14th edition in 1970 to its 27th edition in 1983 until his role was split in 1984 with Derek Malcolm replacing him as festival director and Sheila Whitaker as program director.

In 1983, he moved back to the United States to become artistic director at the Los Angeles International Film Exposition (Filmex) which ran until 1985. He became the American Film Institute's director of exhibition programming in 1984 and in January 1987, the Institute launched the AFI Fest Los Angeles to take the place of Filmex, with Wlashchin named as director of the new festival. He was director until 1993. He later became the institute's director of creative affairs and was also vice chairman of the National Center for Film and Video Preservation and director of the National Film Theater at the John F. Kennedy Center for the Performing Arts.

He wrote over 20 books, including To Kill the Pope (1971), several film encyclopedias, the Encyclopedia of American Opera, and a book on composer Gian Carlo Menotti. He wrote the novel adaptation for the 1969 film The Italian Job. The film had been written by his brother-in-law Troy Kennedy Martin.

He became a Member of the Most Excellent Order of the British Empire (MBE) in 1981.

He died November 10, 2009, at home in Palm Springs, California at the age of 75.

He was married to Maureen Kennedy Martin, a folk singer who he met in Ireland in 1956 and married in 1961. She later became a story editor for EMI Films. They had a son, Scott, born in Guildford, England in 1961.
