= BFI London Film Festival =

Annual event in London, England

Coordinates: 51.5072°N 0.1157°W

- Location: London, England
- Founded: 1957; 69 years ago
- Most recent: 2026
- Website: bfi.org.uk/london-film-festival

Current: 70th BFI London Film Festival
- 71th 69th

The BFI London Film Festival is an annual film festival held in London, England, in collaboration with the British Film Institute. Founded in 1957, the festival runs for two weeks every October.

In 2016, the BFI estimated that around 240 feature films and 150 short films from more than 70 countries are screened at the festival each year.

== History ==
At a dinner party in 1953, at the home of film critic Dilys Powell of The Sunday Times, attended by film administrator James Quinn, guests discussed the lack of a film festival in London. Quinn went on to start the first London Film Festival, which took place at the new National Film Theatre (now renamed BFI Southbank) from 16 to 26 October 1957. The first festival screened 15–20 films that were already successful at other festivals, including Akira Kurosawa's Throne of Blood (which opened the festival), Satyajit Ray's Aparajito, Andrzej Wajda's Kanał, Luchino Visconti's White Nights, Ingmar Bergman's The Seventh Seal, Federico Fellini's Nights of Cabiria and Elia Kazan's A Face in the Crowd. The first edition was sponsored by The Sunday Times.

The second festival saw the introduction of the Sutherland Trophy, an annual award for "the maker of the most original and imaginative film introduced at the National Film Theatre during the year", which was awarded to Yasujirō Ozu for Tokyo Story. The third festival featured François Truffaut's The 400 Blows, for which he famously turned up to the festival without a ticket and unable to speak English.

Richard Roud became festival director in 1960, the first year that a British film was shown at the festival; the world premiere of Karel Reisz's Saturday Night and Sunday Morning. The fourth edition contained films from 14 other countries shown at seven other festivals, including Michelangelo Antonioni's L'Avventura and Luis Buñuel's The Young One, plus five films not shown at other festivals, including Truffaut's Shoot the Pianist and Studs Lonigan.

The 1962 festival featured the first midnight matinee, Tony Richardson's The Loneliness of the Long Distance Runner. Roman Polanski's first feature-length film Knife in the Water and Jean-Luc Godard's Vivre sa vie were also screened.

A new strand of the festival called London Choices was added in 1965 which featured debut and lesser-known features. One of the first London Choices features was Dear John, directed by Lars-Magnus Lindgren.

1967 saw the first features films directed by women screened – Shirley Clarke's Portrait of Jason, Agnès Varda's Les Créatures and Věra Chytilová's Daisies.

Jean-Luc Godard's first English language film, One Plus One, was shown under the London Choices strand in 1968. After the screening, Godard punched producer Iain Quarrier in the face on stage for changes Quarrier made to the film's ending. The world premiere of Lindsay Anderson's If.... closed the festival.

=== 1970–1983 ===
Ken Wlaschin became the festival director in February 1970 and expanded the size and diversity of the festival. His first festival featured 28 films, opening with Truffaut's L'Enfant sauvage and featuring Kurosawa's Dodes'ka-den and the world premiere of Anthony Friedman's Bartleby. A recently opened second screen at the NFT was also used. David Lynch's short film The Grandmother was also shown in 1970.

The 1971 festival was expanded to include a directors' section, featuring the premiere of Mike Leigh's feature film debut Bleak Moments. Between 13 and 29 November 1972, 44 films were screened in two categories; one for established directors and one for younger directors. The 1974 festival opened on 18 November and featured 60 films starting with the premiere of Peter Hall's Akenfield. The Texas Chain Saw Massacre was screened in a members-only screening due to it not being classified by the BBFC. Similar screenings were held for The Beast in 1975 and Salò, or the 120 Days of Sodom in 1977.

Due to financial restrictions, the 1978 festival was shortened from 21 to 16 days and there was hardly any publicity. It opened with a spotlight on new Australian cinema, starting with Phillip Noyce's Newsfront and films by Bruce Beresford and Donald Crombie. The festival made a special concession to allow six of the films selected for the festival to also be screened at Time Out's 10th Anniversary Film Festival in September 1978 without changing the regulation stating that LFF films must be British premieres.

The 25th festival opened on 4 November 1981 with a gala presentation of Gallipoli attended by Charles, Prince of Wales, the BFI patron, and Diana, Princess of Wales. It was the largest ever to date, featuring 127 films. It also expanded outside of London for the first time with 12 programmes playing in eight cinemas around the country. It closed on 22 November with the British film Priest of Love directed by Christopher Miles. The 1982 festival opened 11 November 1982 with 4 independent British films – Claude Whatham's The Captain's Doll, Peter Greenaway's The Draughtsman's Contract, Barney Platts-Mills' Hero and Mai Zetterling's Scrubbers – and closed 28 November.

=== Expansion ===
In 1984, Wlaschin's role as program director for the National Film Theatre (NFT) and festival director was split, with The Guardian film critic Derek Malcolm taking over as festival director, initially temporarily, and Sheila Whitaker as NFT program director. Malcolm expanded the festival to 7 theatres other than the NFT (Dominion Theatre; Odeon Leicester Square; Queen Elizabeth Hall; the ICA Cinema; The Lumiere; The Premiere and London Film-Makers' Co-op); introduced Festival on the Square, which showed more popular films; added a surprise film each year; and increased attendances, trying to change it from a festival for film buffs to one for the public. The 1984 festival opened with Gremlins at the NFT on 14 November and closed on 2 December with a gala presentation at the Dominion of a new print of the 1924 version of The Thief of Baghdad starring Douglas Fairbanks with the score composed and conducted by Carl Davis. It was the most popular festival to date with 57,000 tickets sold, and Malcolm was retained to organize the festival the following year.

The 1985 festival was expanded to feature 161 films and ran from 14 November to 1 December, opening with Akira Kurosawa's Ran and closing with Michael Cimino's Year of the Dragon and Peter Greenaway's A Zed & Two Noughts. The best films of the festival were to be shown around 15 towns around the country after the event.

The films were grouped into regional categories. In 2009, these were: Galas and Special Screenings, Film on the Square, New British Cinema, French Revolutions, Cinema Europa, World Cinema, Experimenta, Treasures from the Archives, Short Cuts, and Animation.

Since 1986, the festival has been "topped and tailed" by the opening and closing galas, which have become major red-carpet events in the London calendar. The opening and closing galas are often world, European, or UK premiere screenings, which take place in large venues in central London. They are attended by the cast and crew of the films and are introduced by the festival director, the film's director or producers, and often the actors themselves.

The 30th edition of the festival in 1986 opened with Nicolas Roeg's Castaway on 13 November and closed with Ken Russell's film Gothic on 30 November. The festival had a "post script" the next day on 1 December with a Royal charity performance of Labyrinth attended by the Prince and Princess of Wales.

=== 1987–1996 ===
Sheila Whitaker, who had been the manager of the National Film Theatre, replaced Malcolm in 1987. The 1987 festival was the first to open at the Empire, Leicester Square on 11 November 1987. It was due to open with A Prayer for the Dying, a film about an IRA member but was pulled 2 days before the opening following the IRA's Remembrance Day bombing in Enniskillen on 8 November. The film was replaced with Dark Eyes. The closing gala was held on 29 November featuring Stephen Frears' Sammy and Rosie Get Laid.

During her period as director, Whitaker continued to expand the festival. By the end of her tenure as director in 1996, the festival had grown to include screenings of over 200 films from around the world, more venues had been added, and more tickets were sold to non-BFI members. She also began the festival's practice of including newly restored films from the National Film Archive and overseas institutions.

The 1989 festival expanded the number of venues, with the festival showing films in South London for the first time with the addition of the Ritzy Cinema in Brixton and the Brixton Village Cultural Centre. The Screen on the Green in Islington and the Rio Cinema, Dalston were also added as venues. It featured Max Ophüls La signora di tutti (1934) in tribute to former festival director Richard Roud who had died in February 1989. The junior section of the festival was separated out into a Junior London Film Festival which ran from 21 to 29 October over the half term holiday featuring ten feature films, starting with The Wolves of Willoughby Chase.

The 1990 festival featured 180 films compared to 145 in the previous year. It included a section Focus on Hong Kong which featured the world premiere of Jackie Chan's Armour of God II: Operation Condor. The festival also featured the world premieres of Mike Leigh's Life Is Sweet and Anthony Minghella's Truly, Madly, Deeply (under the title Cello).

The 1991 festival was dedicated to David Lean, who had died earlier in the year. The festival opened with the world premiere of Mike Newell's Enchanted April and closed with the European premiere of Mark Peploe's debut film Afraid of the Dark.

In 1993, the Children's London Film Festival was re-incorporated into the main festival. The opening night film was the European premiere of James Ivory's The Remains of the Day.

The 1994 festival opened with the world premiere of Mary Shelley's Frankenstein directed by Kenneth Branagh. The festival featured an expanded programme at the Odeon West End in Leicester Square, with the festival taking over the cinema for its duration. A 12-film sidebar was added for Arabian and Middle Eastern films, in addition to sidebars for French and Asian films.

Due to classification issues, special permission was needed from Westminster City Council to screen Oliver Stone's Natural Born Killers in 1994 and David Cronenberg's Crash in 1996. The 1996 festival featured Shane Meadows' debut film Small Time.

=== 1997–2011 ===
Adrian Wooton was appointed festival director and Sandra Hebron as festival programmer in 1997.

From 2000, the festival was sponsored by Regus and became known as the Regus London Film Festival. The first festival under Regus opened with Cameron Crowe's Almost Famous on 1 November 2000 and closed on 16 November with Born Romantic. The 2001 festival opened with the premiere of Robert Altman's Gosford Park on 7 November and closed on 22 November with Iain Softley's K-PAX. The 2002 festival was held 6–21 November, attracting a then record 110,000 visitors, opening with Stephen Frears' Dirty Pretty Things and closing with Thaddeus O'Sullivan's The Heart of Me.

Hebron became artistic director of the festival in 2003, replacing Wooton. The same year, the festival's sponsor was changed to The Times and became known as The Times BFI London Film Festival.

The fiftieth edition of the festival opened 18 October 2006 with the European premiere of Kevin McDonald's The Last King of Scotland. It also featured the European premieres of Todd Field's Little Children and Anthony Minghella's Breaking and Entering. It closed on 2 November with Babel.

Previously a number of festival awards were presented at the Closing gala, but in 2009, with the aid of some funding from the UK Film Council, a stand-alone awards ceremony was introduced. The UK Film Council helped fund the festival for three years until it was abolished in 2011.

In 2009 the festival, whilst focused around Leicester Square (Vue West End, Odeon West End and Empire) and the BFI Southbank in central London, also screened films across 18 other venues – Curzon Mayfair Cinema, ICA Cinema on The Mall, The Ritzy in Brixton, Cine Lumière in South Kensington, Queen Elizabeth Hall on the South Bank, David Lean Cinema in Croydon, the Genesis Cinema in Whitechapel, The Greenwich Picturehouse, the Phoenix Cinema in East Finchley, Rich Mix in Old Street, the Rio Cinema in Dalston, the Tricycle Cinema in Kilburn, the Waterman Art Centre in Brentford and Trafalgar Square for the open air screening of short films from the BFI National Archive. The 2009 Festival featured 15 world premieres including Wes Anderson's first animated feature, Fantastic Mr. Fox, Sam Taylor-Wood's feature début Nowhere Boy, about the formative years of John Lennon, as well as the Festival's first ever Archive Gala, the BFI's new restoration of Anthony Asquith's Underground, with live music accompaniment by the Prima Vista Social Club. European premieres in 2009 included Jean-Pierre Jeunet's Micmacs, Scott Hicks' The Boys Are Back and Robert Connolly's Balibo, as well as Umesh Vinayak Kulkarni's The Well and Lucy Bailey and Andrew Thompson's Mugabe and the White African.

In 2009, directors travelling to London to introduce their latest work included Michael Haneke (Cannes Palme d'Or winner, The White Ribbon), Atom Egoyan (Chloe), Steven Soderbergh (The Informant!), Lone Scherfig (An Education), Ang Lee (Taking Woodstock), Jane Campion (Bright Star), Gaspar Noé (Enter The Void), Lee Daniels (Precious), Grant Heslov (The Men Who Stare at Goats), and Jason Reitman (Up in the Air). In addition to Fantastic Mr. Fox and Up in the Air, George Clooney supported his role in The Men Who Stare at Goats. The Festival also welcomed back previous alumni such as John Hillcoat (The Road), Joe Swanberg (Alexander The Last) and Harmony Korine (Trash Humpers), whilst also screening films from Manoel de Oliveira (Eccentricities of a Blonde-Haired Girl), Jim Jarmusch (The Limits Of Control), Claire Denis (White Material), Ho-Yuhang (At The End Of Daybreak), Todd Solondz (Life During Wartime), and Joel and Ethan Coen (A Serious Man).

American Express became the festival's principal sponsor in 2010 and the name changed to the BFI London Film Festival.

=== 2012–2017 ===
Clare Stewart was appointed as head of exhibition at the BFI in August 2011 replacing Hebron and was the festival's director from the 2012 edition. Under Stewart, a formal competition was organised in 2012; films were organized into strands such as "Love", "Debate", "Dare" and "Thrill" and films started to be screened outside of London.

The 2013 festival opened with Captain Phillips and closed with the world premiere of Saving Mr. Banks, both starring Tom Hanks.

248 films were screened in 2014 and the festival saw a record attendance of 163,000. Simultaneous screenings of the opening and closing films (The Imitation Game and Fury) took place around the UK.

The Odeon West End, which accounted for 23% of admissions in 2014, closed 1 January 2015, so more screenings moved to the Vue West End as well as moving to the Cineworld Haymarket and Picturehouse Central. Festival attendances fell 4% for the 2015 edition. The festival featured 14 world premieres and 40 European premieres.

The 60th edition of the festival saw the opening of the temporary Embankment Garden Cinema, in Victoria Embankment Gardens. In the first 60 years of the festival, it had shown 27 films by Rainer Werner Fassbinder, 19 by Satyajit Ray and 18 by Jean-Luc Godard.

=== BFI London Film Festival today ===
The program also features world cinema. Whilst it continues to be first and foremost a public festival, it is also attended by large numbers of film professionals and journalists from all over the world. It offers opportunities for people to see films that may not otherwise get a UK screening along with films that will get a release in the near future. Some films are accompanied by Q&A sessions which give the audience unique access to the filmmaker and/or a member of the cast and offer insight into the making of the film and occasionally an opportunity for the audience to engage directly and ask questions. Other than these events, the screenings at the Festival are quite informal and similar to the normal cinema experience.

Stewart took a sabbatical for the 2018 edition of the festival and her deputy, Tricia Tuttle stood in as interim artistic director. She became artistic director in December 2018. Current film programmers include Kate Taylor (Senior Programmer), Michael Blyth and Laure Bonville.

The 2018 festival opened with the European premiere of Steve McQueen's Widows. It saw the first film at the festival to premiere outside London with the UK premiere of Mike Leigh's Peterloo being held at HOME in Manchester on 17 October as well as the world premiere of Peter Jackson's They Shall Not Grow Old, which was also screened simultaneously around the UK. It closed with the world premiere of Stan & Ollie.

The 2019 edition opened with Armando Iannucci's The Personal History of David Copperfield which was shown at the Odeon Leicester Square and at the Embankment Garden Cinema.

Due to the COVID-19 pandemic in the United Kingdom, the 2020 festival featured up to 50 online films with only 12 films being shown in London and around the United Kingdom. The festival opened with the European premiere of Steve McQueen's Mangrove and closed with Ammonite, directed by Francis Lee.

The 2021 festival opened with the world premiere of Jeymes Samuel's The Harder They Fall at Royal Festival Hall.

Tuttle stepped down as festival director after the 2022 festival and was replaced by Kristy Matheson.

The main sponsor for the 70th festival was the UK Government.

== Programmes ==
The Festival is organized in various sections:

- Galas
  - Opening Night Gala – Film that screened on the opening night.
  - Closing Night Gala – Film that screened on the closing night.
  - Headline Galas – About 10 films, including Mayor of London's Gala and BFI Patrons' Gala, to name a few.
  - Festival and Strand Gala – Red carpet galas of themed strands: Cult, Dare, Thrill, Debate, Love, Laugh, Family, Journey, Create, and Treasures.
- Special Presentations – Focus on new works from major directors. This section includes Documentary, Experimenta, BFI Flare and other Special Presentations.
- Strands – Films were organized according to themes to encourage discovery and to open up the Festival to new audiences. The themes include:
  - Love – films that are sweet, passionate and tough, as well as charts the highs and lows of many kind of love from around the globe.
  - Debate – features films that are amplify, scrutinize, argue, surprise and thrives on conversation.
  - Laugh – celebrates humour in all its form, from laugh-out-loud comedy to dry and understated
  - Dare – features in-your-face, up-front and arresting films that take audience out of their comfort zones
  - Thrill – features nerve-shredders that get audience on the edge of their seats
  - Cult – features films that are mind-altering and classifiable, as well as sci-fi and horror genre
  - Journey – focused on the journey or the destination that transport and shift the perspectives of audience
  - Create – features films that channel the electricity of creative process and celebrating artistic expression in all its form
  - Experimenta – features films and videos by artists that revolutionize and reshape the vision of cinema
  - Family – showcases films for the young and the young at heart
  - Expanded – showcases immersive art and extended reality (XR) content
- In Competition – celebrate the highest creative achievements of British and international filmmakers.
  - Official competition – films are competing for the Best Film Award.
  - First Feature Competition – films are competing for the Sutherland Award.
  - Documentary Competition – films are competing for the Grierson Award.
  - Audience Awards
  - Short Film Award – recognizes short from works with a unique cinematic view.

== Surprise film ==
Derek Malcolm introduced a screening of an unannounced film during the festival each year known as the Surprise Film.

For the 50th anniversary of the festival, rather than one surprise film, there were 50 screenings of a surprise film around London.

== List of festival editions ==
=== 1957–1984 ===
Edition	Dates	Opening Film	Closing Film	Sutherland Trophy
1	16–26 October 1957	Throne of Blood		
2	6–14 October 1958	H-8		Tokyo Story
3	12 October – 1 November 1959	A Midsummer Night's Dream		The World of Apu
4	20 October – 3 November 1960	Les jeux de l'amour		L'Avventura
5	17–31 October 1961	Lola		Il Posto
6	16–30 October 1962	Le Caporal épinglé		Paris Belongs to Us
7	15–30 October 1963	The Funny Side of Life		Muriel
8	26 October – 8 November 1964	The Umbrellas of Cherbourg		Hamlet
9	4–18 November 1965	A Blonde in Love		Pierrot le Fou
10	21 November – 4 December 1966	The Shameless Old Lady		The Man Who Had His Hair Cut Short
11	20 November – 3 December 1967	La Marseillaise		Samurai Rebellion
12	19 November – 5 December 1968	The Fireman's Ball	If....	The Chronicle of Anna Magdalena Bach
13	17 November – 3 December 1969	My Night at Maud's	Boy; Sweet Hunters	L'Amour fou
14	16 November – 2 December 1970	L'Enfant sauvage	Quiet Days in Clichy	The Conformist
15	15 November – 1 December 1971	Trafic		Four Nights of a Dreamer
16	13–29 November 1972	Company limited		The Hour of the Furnaces
17	20 November – 7 December 1973	Payday	Ludwig: Requiem for a Virgin King	Pirosmani
18	18 November – 8 December 1974	Akenfield	The Ferocious One	Martha
19	17 November – 7 December 1975	Winstanley; Requiem for a Village	The Middleman	The Travelling Players
20	15 November – 5 December 1976	The Devil's Playground	The Killing of a Chinese Bookie	In the Realm of the Senses
21	14 November – 4 December 1977	1900	A Woman of Paris	Hitler: A Film from Germany
22	14–30 November 1978	Newsfront	The Sailor's Return	The Scenic Route
23	15 November – 2 December 1979	Those Wonderful Movie Cranks	My Brilliant Career; Breaking Away	The Herd
24	13–30 November 1980	Kagemusha	Raging Bull	The Falls; Two Stage Sisters
25	4–22 November 1981	Gallipoli	Priest of Love	No Mercy, No Future
26	11–28 November 1982	The Captain's Doll; The Draughtsman's Contract; Hero; Scrubbers	The Missionary; Privates on Parade	Elippathayam
27	17 November – 4 December 1983	Finally, Sunday!	Loose Connections	Sans Soleil
28	14 November – 2 December 1984	Gremlins	The Thief of Baghdad	This Is My Country

=== 1985–2008 ===
Edition	Dates	Opening Gala	Closing Gala	Sutherland Trophy	Surprise Film
29	14 November – 1 December 1985	Ran	Year of the Dragon; A Zed & Two Noughts	Yellow Earth	A Chorus Line
30	13 November – 1 December 1986	Castaway	Gothic	Comrades	The Color of Money
31	11–29 November 1987	Dark Eyes	Sammy and Rosie Get Laid	Terrorizers/Yeelen	Someone to Watch Over Me
32	10–27 November 1988	Things Change	For Queen and Country		Married to the Mob
33	10–26 November 1989	Parenthood	What Time Is It?	Pathfinder	Sea of Love
34	8–25 November 1990	Texasville	The Sheltering Sky	The Fabulous Baker Boys	Arachnophobia
35	6–21 November 1991	Enchanted April	Afraid of the Dark	On the Wire	Night on Earth
36	5–22 November 1992	Peter's Friends	Blade Runner – The Director's Cut	Proof	Death Becomes Her
37	4–21 November 1993	The Remains of the Day	Farewell My Concubine	Vacas	The Age of Innocence
38	3–20 November 1994	Mary Shelley's Frankenstein	Léon	The Scent of Green Papaya	Bullets Over Broadway
39	2–19 November 1995	Strange Days	Casino	The Silences of the Palace	Johnny Mnemonic
40	7–24 November 1996	The First Wives Club	Blood and Wine	Bob's Weekend	The Long Kiss Goodnight
41	6–23 November 1997	Keep the Aspidistra Flying	One Night Stand	The Life of Jesus	Breakdown
42	5–22 November 1998	Little Voice	Bulworth	The Apple	Pleasantville
43	3–18 November 1999	Ride with the Devil	American Beauty	Ratcatcher	The Insider
44	1–16 November 2000	Almost Famous	Born Romantic	You Can Count on Me	Meet the Parents
45	7–22 November 2001	Gosford Park	K-PAX	The Warrior	Hearts in Atlantis
46	6–21 November 2002	Dirty Pretty Things	The Heart of Me	Carnages	Far From Heaven
47	22 October – 6 November 2003	In the Cut	Sylvia	Osama	School of Rock
48	20 October – 4 November 2004	Vera Drake	I Heart Huckabees	Tarnation	Sideways
49	19 October – 3 November 2005	The Constant Gardener	Good Night, and Good Luck	For the Living and the Dead	Mrs Henderson Presents
50	18 October – 2 November 2006	The Last King of Scotland	Babel	Red Road	Multiple films
51	18–27 October 2007	Eastern Promises	The Darjeeling Limited	Persepolis	No Country for Old Men
52	15–30 October 2008	Frost/Nixon	Slumdog Millionaire	Tulpan	The Wrestler

=== 2009–Present ===
Edition	Dates	Opening Gala	Closing Gala	Sutherland Trophy	Best Film	Surprise Film
53	14–29 October 2009	Fantastic Mr. Fox	Nowhere Boy	Ajami	Un prophète	Capitalism: A Love Story
54	13–28 October 2010	Never Let Me Go	127 Hours	The Arbor	How I Ended This Summer	Brighton Rock
55	12–27 October 2011	360	The Deep Blue Sea	Las Acacias	We Need to Talk About Kevin	Damsels in Distress
56	10–21 October 2012	Frankenweenie	Great Expectations	Beasts of the Southern Wild	Rust and Bone	Silver Linings Playbook
57	9–20 October 2013	Captain Phillips	Saving Mr. Banks	Ilo Ilo	Ida	The Grandmaster
58	8–19 October 2014	The Imitation Game	Fury	The Tribe	Leviathan	Birdman
59	7–18 October 2015	Suffragette	Steve Jobs	The Witch	Chevalier	Anomalisa
60	5–16 October 2016	A United Kingdom	Free Fire	Raw	Certain Women	Sully
61	4–15 October 2017	Breathe	Three Billboards Outside Ebbing, Missouri	The Wound	Loveless	Lady Bird
62	10–21 October 2018	Widows	Stan & Ollie	Girl	Joy	Green Book
63	2–13 October 2019	The Personal History of David Copperfield	The Irishman	Atlantics	Monos	Uncut Gems
64	7–18 October 2020	Mangrove	Ammonite	N/A	Another Round	None
65	6–17 October 2021	The Harder They Fall	The Tragedy of Macbeth	Playground	Hit the Road	C'mon C'mon
66	5–16 October 2022	Roald Dahl's Matilda the Musical	Glass Onion: A Knives Out Mystery	1976	Corsage	The Menu
67	4–15 October 2023	Saltburn	The Kitchen	Paradise is Burning	Evil Does Not Exist	Ferrari
68	9–20 October 2024	Blitz	Piece by Piece	On Falling	Memoir of a Snail	Saturday Night
69	8–19 October 2025	Wake Up Dead Man: A Knives Out Mystery	100 Nights of Hero	One Woman One Bra	Our Land	Tuner
70	7–18 October 2026	Elsinore	The Debut	9 Temples to Heaven	Imperium	I Play Rocky

== List of festival directors ==
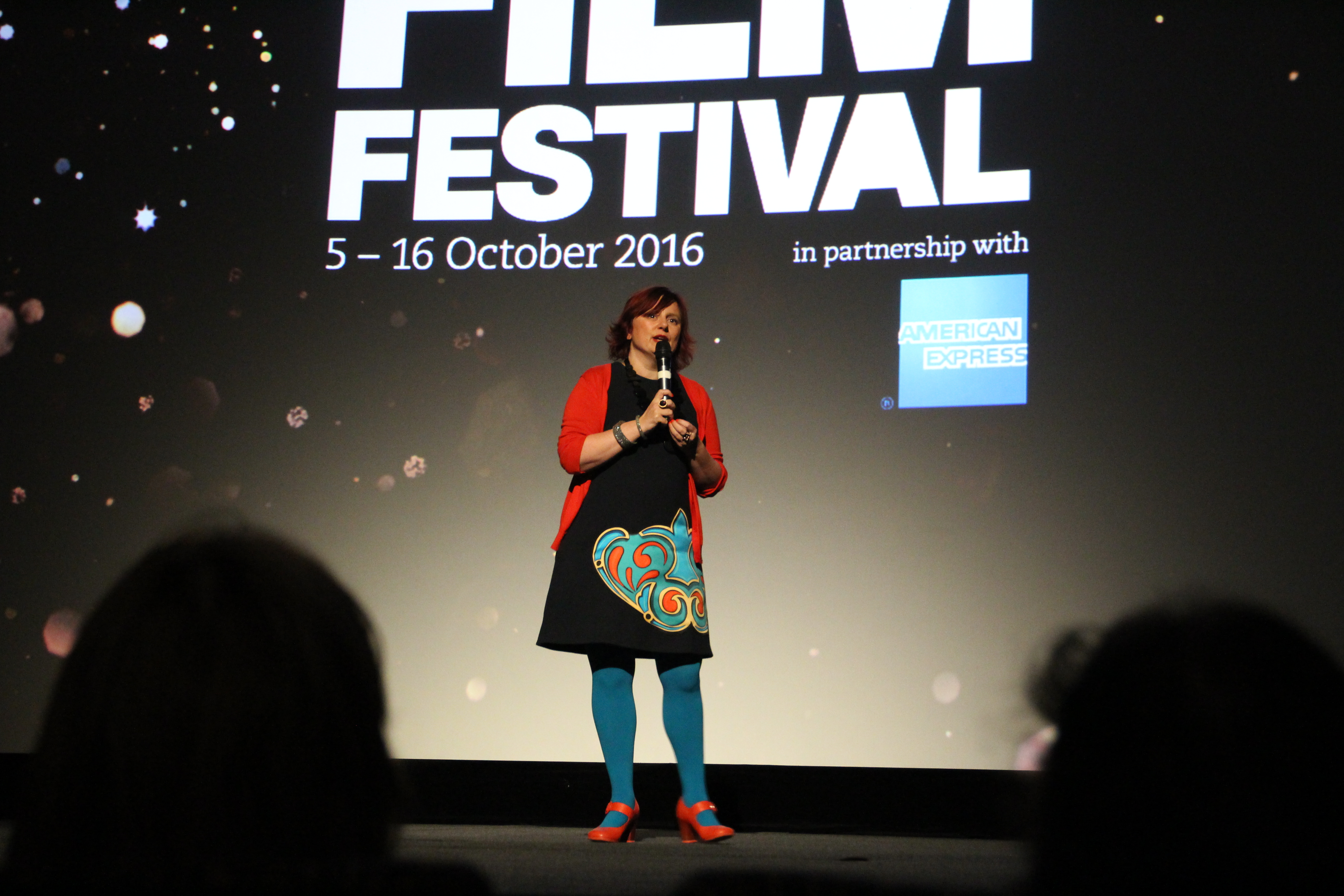
Clare Stewart at the 2016 festival

Director	From	To
Richard Roud	1960	1969
Ken Wlaschin	1970	1983
Derek Malcolm	1984	1986
Sheila Whitaker	1987	1996
Adrian Wooton	1997	2002
Sandra Hebron	2003	2011
Clare Stewart	2012	2017
Tricia Tuttle	2018	2022
Kristy Matheson	2023	Present

== Awards ==
The categories highlight both emerging and established talent.

- The Sutherland Trophy – for the most original and innovative first feature in the London Film Festival. Named after the BFI's patron, The 5th Duke of Sutherland, this award boasts recipients as noteworthy as Ray, Bertolucci, Fassbinder, Godard and Antonioni.
- The Grierson Award – for the best feature-length documentary in the festival. This award is given jointly by the LFF and the Grierson Trust which commemorates the pioneering Scottish documentary-maker John Grierson (1898–1972), famous for Drifters and Night Mail. The Grierson Trust has a long-standing tradition of recognising outstanding films that demonstrate integrity, originality and technical excellence and social or cultural significance.

From 2009, a new standalone awards ceremony was launched which included the following awards:

- Best Film – celebrates creative, original, imaginative, intelligent and distinctive filmmaking.
- Best British Newcomer Award – celebrates new and emerging British film talent and recognises the achievements of a new writer, producer or director who demonstrates real creative flair and imagination with their first feature.
- BFI Fellowships – the Festival showcases both the work of new filmmakers and established ones, and presenting two Fellowships provides a fitting contrast to those Awards recognising new talent.

== Winners ==
=== 2004 ===
The Sutherland Trophy
Tarnation, dir. Jonathan Caouette
7th FIPRESCI International Critics Award
Aaltra, dir. Gustave de Kervern and Benoît Delépine
The Alfred Dunhill UK Film Talent Award
A Way of Life, dir. Amma Asante
9th Annual Satyajit Ray Award
The Woodsman, dir. Nicole Kassell
TCM Classic Shorts Award
Nits, dir. Harry Wootliff

=== 2005 ===
The Sutherland Trophy
For the Living and the Dead, dir. Kari Paljakka
8th FIPRESCI International Critics Award
Man Push Cart, dir. Ramin Bahrani
The Alfred Dunhill UK Film Talent Award
Producer Gayle Griffiths
The 10th Annual Satyajit Ray Award
Pavee Lackeen, dir. Perry Ogden
The Grierson Award for Best Documentary
Workingman's Death, dir. Michael Glawogger
TCM Classic Shorts Award
Jane Lloyd, dir. HAPPY (Directing duo Guy Shelmerdine and Richard Farmer (director))

=== 2006 ===
The Sutherland Trophy
Red Road, dir. Andrea Arnold
9th FIPRESCI International Critics Award
Lola, dir. Javier Rebollo
The Alfred Dunhill UK Film Talent Award
Producer Mark Herbert
The 11th Annual Satyajit Ray Award
The Lives of Others, dir. Florian Henckel von Donnersmarck
The Grierson Award for Best Documentary
Thin, dir. Lauren Greenfield
TCM Classic Shorts Award
Silence Is Golden, dir. Chris Shepherd

=== 2007 ===
The Sutherland Trophy
Persepolis, dir. Marjane Satrapi and Vincent Paronnaud
10th FIPRESCI International Critics Award
Unrelated, dir. Joanna Hogg
The Alfred Dunhill UK Film Talent Award
Sarah Gavron, director of Brick Lane
The 12th Annual Satyajit Ray Award
California Dreamin', awarded posthumously to director Cristian Nemescu
The Grierson Award for Best Documentary
The Mosquito Problem and Other Stories, dir. Andrey Paounov
TCM Classic Shorts Award
À bout de truffe, dir. Tom Tagholm

=== 2008 ===
The Sutherland Trophy
Tulpan, dir. Sergey Dvortsevoy
11th FIPRESCI International Critics Award
Three Blind Mice, dir. Matthew Newton
The 13th Annual Satyajit Ray Award
Mid-August Lunch, dir. Gianni Gregorio
The Grierson Award for Best Documentary
Victoire Terminus, dir. Florent de la Tullaye and Renaud Barret
TCM Classic Shorts Award
Leaving, dir. Richard Penfold and Sam Hearn

=== 2009 ===
In 2009, a new annual standalone awards ceremony was launched to showcase the work of imaginative and original filmmakers and to reward distinctive and intriguing work.

The Awards took place at the Inner Temple on 28 October 2009 and were hosted by Paul Gambaccini. Winners of the Sutherland Trophy, Best British Newcomer and Best Film received the inaugural Star of London award designed by sculptor Almuth Tebbenhoff.

Best Film
Un prophète, dir. Jacques Audiard
The Sutherland Trophy
Ajami, dir. Scandar Copti and Yaron Shani
Best British Newcomer Award
Jack Thorne, writer of The Scouting Book For Boys
The Grierson Award for Best Documentary
Defamation, dir. Yoav Shamir
BFI Fellowships
Filmmaker – Souleymane Cissé
Actor – John Hurt

Judges

- Best Film: Anjelica Huston, John Akomfrah, Jarvis Cocker, Mathieu Kassovitz, Charlotte Rampling, Iain Softley
- The Sutherland Trophy: Paul Greengrass, David Parfitt, Matt Bochenski, Gillian Wearing, Molly Dineen, Mark Cosgrove, Kerry Fox, Sara Frain, Michael Hayden, Sandra Hebron
- Best British Newcomer Award: Lenny Crooks, Christine Langan, Tessa Ross, Tanya Seghatchian, Michael Hayden, Sandra Hebron
- The Grierson Award: Nick Broomfield, Ellen Fleming, Christopher Hird, Michael Hayden, Sandra Hebron

=== 2010 ===
Best Film
How I Ended This Summer, dir. Alexei Popogrebski
The Sutherland Trophy
The Arbor, dir. Clio Barnard
Best British Newcomer Award
Clio Barnard, director of The Arbor
The Grierson Award for Best Documentary
Armadillo, dir. Janus Metz
BFI Fellowship
Filmmaker – Danny Boyle

=== 2011 ===
Best Film
We Need to Talk About Kevin, dir. Lynne Ramsay
The Sutherland Trophy
Las Acacias, dir. Pablo Giorgelli
Best British Newcomer Award
Candese Reid, actress in Junkhearts
The Grierson Award for Best Documentary
Into the Abyss: A Tale of Death, A Tale of Life, dir. Werner Herzog
BFI Fellowships
Filmmaker – David Cronenberg
Actor – Ralph Fiennes

=== 2013 ===
Pawel Pawlikowski, best known for his films My Summer of Love and Last Resort, won the Best Film award for his black and white social drama Ida, his first film shot in his native Poland. Pawlikowski, at the time, was a visiting tutor at the National Film and Television School in Buckinghamshire and one of his pupils there, Anthony Chen, picked up the Best First Feature prize for Ilo Ilo.

=== 2014 ===
Leviathan was named the Best Film at the London Film Festival Awards on 18 October 2014, at a ceremony where the main prizes went to Russia, Ukraine (Best First Feature, The Tribe) and Syria (Best Documentary, Silvered Water), three countries at the centre of long-running conflicts. The winning film-makers all said they hoped that culture could help to restore peace to their countries.

=== 2015 ===
At a London Film Festival declared by its director Clare Stewart to be promoting strong women in the industry, both in front of and behind the camera, the theme continued into the awards, with the Best Film being named as the Greek comedy Chevalier, directed by Athina Rachel Tsangari. The winner of the Sutherland Award for Best First Feature, The Witch, was described by the jury as "a fresh, feminist take on a timeless tale." Another woman was honoured with the Grierson Award for the best documentary; the Australian filmmaker Jennifer Peedom, who was shooting Sherpa as a devastating avalanche struck the Himalayas, in April 2014. And the Oscar-winning Cate Blanchett described how she was "deeply honoured and dumbstruck" at being awarded a BFI Fellowship.

=== 2016 ===
Following the previous year's festival aimed to celebrate strong women in the film industry, 2016 was partly designed to better reflect the diverse audiences in society; the festival opened with a film directed by a black director and the BFI Fellowship was awarded to Steve McQueen. Most of the awards, once again, had strong female themes – either being directed by women, about women or both. Kelly Reichardt's Certain Women won the Official Competition, while Raw, by the French director Julia Ducournau, won the Sutherland Award for the Best First Feature. Noting that there are still too few opportunities for female directors, Ducournau said, "It's about time that things are starting to change. It's good that doors are now being opened." The Grierson Award for the best documentary went to Starless Dreams, filmed inside a rehabilitation centre for juvenile delinquent women in Iran. For the first time, the London Film Festival ran a competition for the best short film. This went to Issa Touma, Thomas Vroege and Floor Van Der Meulen for the documentary 9 Days – From My Window in Aleppo. Touma, a Syrian photographer who regularly returns to Aleppo, said it was important for intellectuals, academics and artists not to desert the country. "You can't change anything from far away," he said.

=== 2017 ===
Accepting the prestigious BFI Fellowship at the 2017 London Film Festival Awards, director Paul Greengrass acknowledged that it had been a difficult week for the film industry, on the day that Harvey Weinstein was expelled from the Academy that hands out the Oscars. He said the industry had to act and words were not enough. The Best Film on the night went to Russia's Loveless, making Andrey Zvyagintsev the second director to have won the honour twice. South Africa's John Trengove won the Best First Film award for The Wound. Lucy Cohen's Kingdom of Us, about the aftermath of a suicide, was named the Best Documentary. And Patrick Bresnan's The Rabbit Hunt won the third Best Short Film prize.

=== 2018 ===
Best Film
Joy, dir. Sudabeh Mortezai
(Special mention: Birds of Passage, dir. Cristina Gallego and Ciro Guerra)
The Sutherland Award
Girl, dir. Lukas Dhont
The Grierson Award for Best Documentary
What You Gonna Do When the World's on Fire?, dir. Roberto Minervini
Short Film Award
Lasting Marks, dir. Charlie Lyne

=== 2019 ===
Best Film
Monos, dir. Alejandro Landes
(Special commendations: Honey Boy, dir. Alma Har'el; Saint Maud, dir. Rose Glass)
The Sutherland Award
Atlantics, dir. Mati Diop
(Special commendation: House of Hummingbird, dir. Bora Kim)
The Grierson Award for Best Documentary
White Riot, dir. Rubika Shah
Short Film Award
Fault Line (Gosal), dir. Soheil Amirsharifi
(Special commendation: If You Knew, dir. Stroma Cairns)

=== 2020 ===
Best Film
Another Round, dir. Thomas Vinterberg
Best Documentary
The Painter and the Thief, dir. Benjamin Ree
Best Short Film
Shuttlecock, dir. Tommy Gillard
Best XR/Immersive Art
To Miss the Ending, created by David Callanan and Anna West
IWC Schaffhausen Filmmaker Bursary Award
Cathy Brady

=== 2021 ===
Best Film
Hit the Road, dir. Panah Panahi

Best First Feature Film
Playground, dir. Laura Wandel

Best Documentary
Becoming Cousteau, dir. Liz Garbus

Best XR/Immersive Art
Only Expansion, created by Duncan Speakman

Best Short Film Competition
Love, Dad, dir. Diana Cam Van Nguyen

Audience Award
Costa Brava, Lebanon, dir. Mounia Akl

=== 2022 ===
Best Film
Corsage, dir. Marie Kreutzer

Best First Feature Film (Sutherland Award)
1976, dir. Manuela Martelli

Best Documentary (Grierson Award)
All That Breathes, dir. Shaunak Sen

Best XR/Immersive Art
As Mine Exactly, created by Charlie Shackleton

I Have No Legs, and I Must Run, dir. Yue Li

Audience Award – Feature
Blue Bag Life, dir. Lisa Selby, Rebecca Hirsch Lloyd-Evans, Alex Fry

Audience Award – Short
Drop Out – Ade Femzo

=== 2023 ===
Best Film
Evil Does Not Exist, dir. Ryusuke Hamaguchi

Best First Feature Film (Sutherland Award)
Paradise Is Burning, dir. Mika Gustafson

Best Documentary (Grierson Award)
Bye Bye Tiberias, dir. Lina Soualem

Best Short Film Competition
The Archive: Queer Nigerians, dir. Simisolaoluwa Akande

=== 2024 ===
Best Film
Memoir of a Snail, dir. Adam Elliot

Best First Feature Film (Sutherland Award)
On Falling, dir. Laura Carreira

Best Documentary (Grierson Award)
Mother Vera, dirs. Cécile Embleton, Alys Tomlinson

Best Short Film Competition
Vibrations from Gaza, dir. Rehab Nazzal

=== 2025 ===
Best Film
Our Land, dir. Lucrecia Martel

Best First Feature Film (Sutherland Award)
One Woman One Bra, dir. Vincho Nchogu

Best Documentary (Grierson Award)
The Travelers, dir. David Bingong
(Special Mention: Always, dir. Deming Chen)

Best Short Film Competition
Coyotes, dir. Said Zagha

Audience Award for Best Feature Film
Hamnet, dir. Chloé Zhao

Audience Award for Best British Discovery
Black Is Beautiful: The Kwame Brathwaite Story, dir. Yemi Bamiro

=== 2026 ===
Best Film
Imperium, dir. Sergei Loznitsa

Best First Feature Film (Sutherland Award)
9 Temples to Heaven, dir. Sompot Chidgasornpongse
(Special Mention: Masc, dir. Bertil Nilsson)

Best Documentary (Grierson Award)
Concrete Land, dir. Asmahan Bkerat
(Special Mention: Queer Edward II, dir. Theo Rollason)

Best Short Film Competition
Aman, dir. Rahul Roye
(Special Mention: Daughters of the Late Colonel, dir. Elizabeth Hobbs)

Audience Award for Best Feature Film
La Bola Negra, dir. Javier Calvo and Javier Ambrossi

Audience Award for Best British Discovery
Dependence, dir. Grace Harper Brighouse

== LFF on Tour ==
To celebrate the 25th anniversary of the London Film Festival in 1981, a selection of festival films were shown at eight regional cinemas throughout the United Kingdom. These were the Birmingham Arts Lab; Sherman Theatre in Cardiff; Edinburgh Filmhouse; Glasgow Film Theatre; Ipswich Film Theatre; Norwich Cinema City; Tyneside Cinema, Newcastle upon Tyne; and Warwick University Arts Centre.

This has continued with some of the films of the 2026 festival, including the opening and closing night galas, screened outside London at the following venues: Broadway Cinema, Nottingham; Chapter Arts Centre, Cardiff; Edinburgh Filmhouse; Glasgow Film Theatre; HOME, Manchester; Midlands Art Centre, Birmingham; Queen's Film Theatre, Belfast; Showroom Cinema, Sheffield; Tyneside Cinema; and Watershed, Bristol.

Other venues used include: the Anvil Cinema, Sheffield; Bradford Film Theatre; The Dukes Playhouse, Lancaster; Metro Cinema, Derby; The New Cinema, Nottingham; The Steps Theatre, Dundee; and The Triangle, Birmingham.

== See also ==
- BBC Proms – Annual classical music concerts in London
- British Film Institute Fellowship – Award
- Frieze Art Fair – International contemporary art fair in London
- London Design Festival – Annual arts event in the United Kingdom
- London Fashion Week – Clothing trade show in London, England
