= Floor Van Der Meulen =

Dutch film director

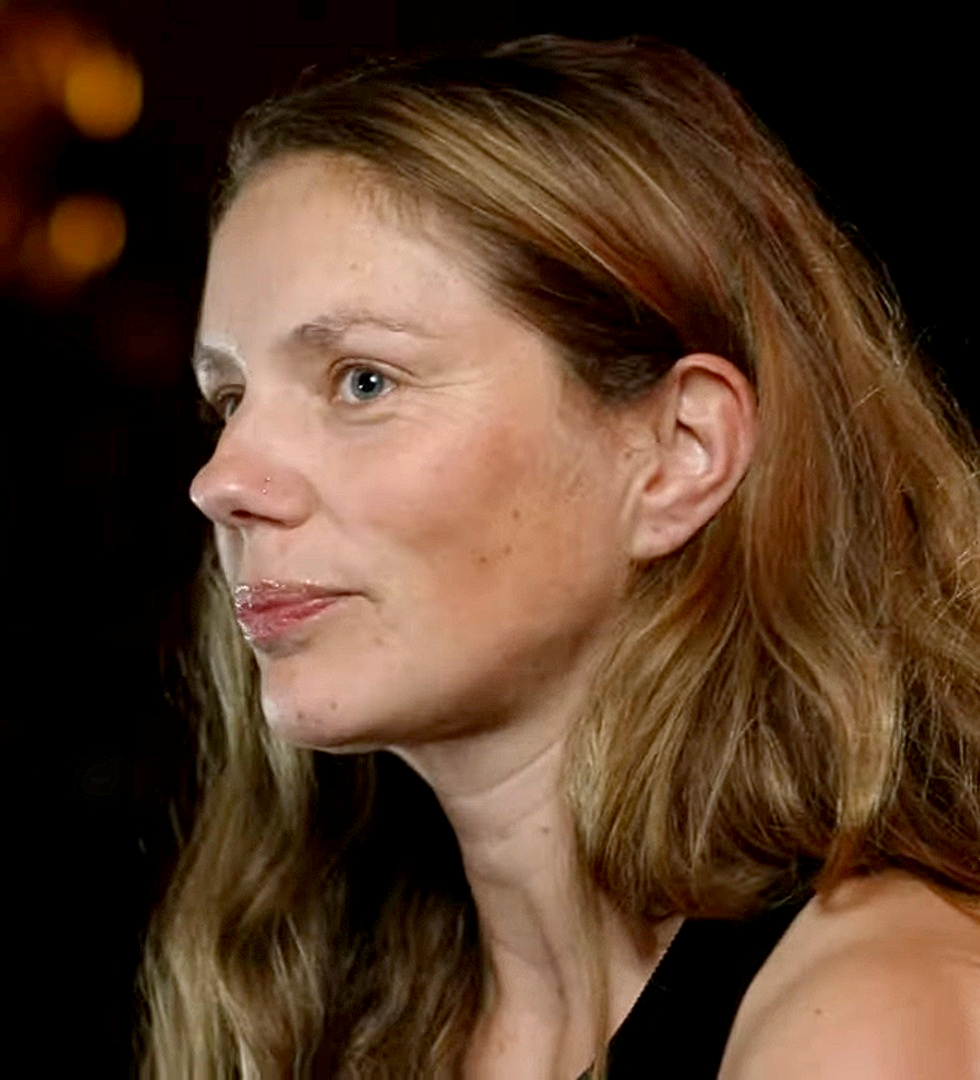
- van der Meulen at BIFF 2022
- Born: 1989 (age 36–37); Netherlands
- Occupation: Film director

Floor Van Der Meulen (born 1989) is a Dutch film director.

== Career ==
Van Der Meulen graduated from the audiovisual design faculty of the Rotterdam Art Academy in 2012 and continued her studies at the School of Visual Arts in New York.

Her 2015 short 9 days: From My Window in Aleppo, co-directed with Thomas Vroege and Issa Touma, won Best European Short Film at the 29th European Short Film Awards as well as Best Short at the BFI Film Festival in London.

Her 2022 feature debut Pink Moon was developed within the Berlinale Script Station and was selected for more than 85 film festivals, including Special Jury Mention for Best New Narrative Director at Tribeca.

In December 2024, her upcoming project Happy Days won the Eurimages Prize at the 16th Les Arcs Film Festival.

== Filmography ==
- 2012 – You&I (short);
- 2014 – Storming Paradise (Paradijsbestormers; documentary);
- 2015 – 9 days: From My Window in Aleppo (short), co-directed with Thomas Vroege and Issa Touma;
- 2016 – In Exile (short)
- 2019 – The Last Male on Earth (documentary feature debut);
- 2019 – Skam NL (series);
- 2022 – Pink Moon (feature debut);
- Upcoming – Happy Days.
