= Clare Stewart =

Australian film festival director

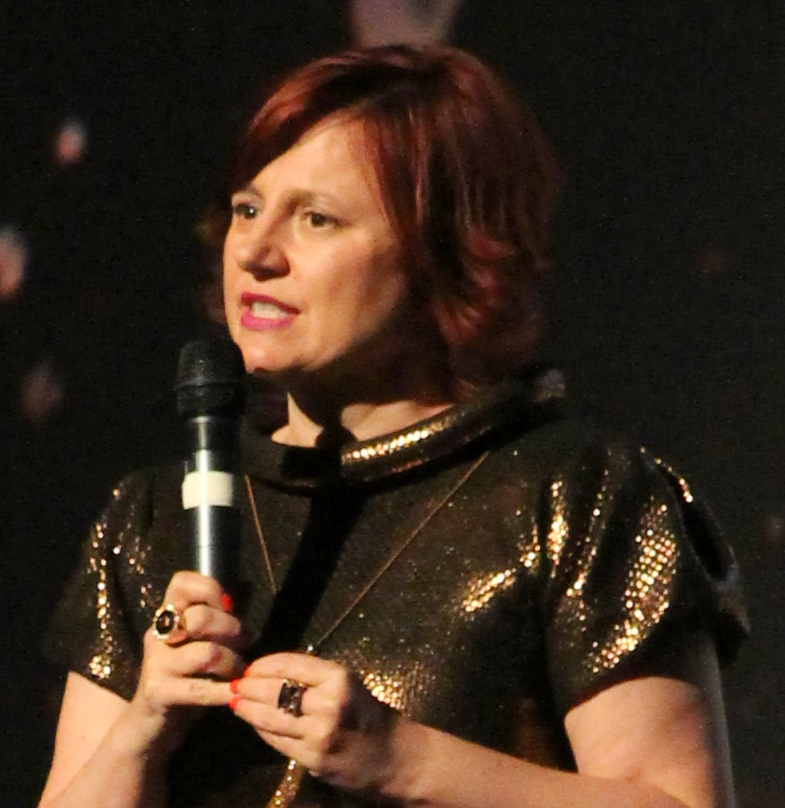
Clare Stewart at the 2016 London Film Festival

Clare Stewart is an Australian film festival director.

She was appointed the festival director of the Sydney Film Festival (SFF) in 2007. In 2008, SFF introduced an international Official Competition for films that are 'courageous, audacious and cutting-edge' which was won by Heartbeats in 2010, Bronson in 2009 and Hunger in 2008. In 2011 she was appointed by the British Film Institute (BFI) to run the BFI London Film Festival. She ran the festival successfully transforming its reputation internationally and making LFF an important festival in the awards calendar. She decided after a sabbatical year to leave the post which will be filled by the interim artistic director from December 2018.

Stewart was previously Head of Film Programs at the Australian Centre for the Moving Image (VIC) where she was responsible for the creative direction of ACMI Cinemas, ACMI's festival and event partnerships and corporate events business. She was the first Australian producer of Resfest and was Creative Director of ARTV, a joint commissioning project between ACMI and SBS. Previously Clare programmed for the Australian Film Institute for five years and the Melbourne Cinémathèque for seven years.

Stewart has lectured in Cinema Studies at RMIT University. As a broadcaster and critic, Clare has reviewed film for radio ABC 774 and 3AK as well as presented Filmbuffs Forecast program for radio 3RRR. Clare is the establishing editor of Cteq, a journal dedicated to film criticism, now published as part of online journal Senses of Cinema. She was a recipient of the Queen's Trust Award for Young Australians and is a past committee member of the Australian Youth Foundation.
