= Imperium (2026 film) =

2026 documentary film by Sergei Loznitsa

- Directed by: Sergei Loznitsa
- Screenplay by: Sergei Loznitsa
- Produced by: Philippe Bober; Anne-Claire Martin; Giovanni Pompili; Uljana Kim; Luca Ricciardi (Executive producer)
- Edited by: Audinga Kučinskaitė; Sergei Loznitsa
- Production companies: Essential Filmproduktion; Kino Produzioni; Société Parisienne de Production; Studio Uljana Kim; Arte France; Rai Cinema; Luce Cinecittà; CSC; Archivio Audiovisivo del movimento operaio e democratico (Promoted by)
- Release date: 5 September 2026 (Venice)
- Running time: 176 minutes
- Countries: Germany; Italy; France; Lithuania
- Language: Russian

Imperium is a 2026 non-narrative documentary film written and directed by Sergei Loznitsa. A co-production between Germany, Italy, France, and Lithuania, it follows a visual journey across the Soviet Union, built entirely from archival footage shot between 1970-73.

The film had its world premiere out of competition at the 83rd Venice International Film Festival on 5 September 2026.

== Synopsis ==
The film is presented as a non-narrated visual record of the Soviet Union, constructed from archival footage captured by Italian filmmakers between 1970 and 1973 and preserved by the Archivio Audiovisivo del Movimento Operaio e Democratico. It documents regions ranging from the Arctic to Central Asia, and from the Carpathian Mountains to the Pacific coast, illustrating the cultural diversity that existed within the USSR despite state efforts toward standardization.

Beginning in Moscow, the film gradually moves toward remote rural areas where long-standing traditions continued to shape daily life. The footage offers rare, unfiltered depictions of everyday practices, revealing underlying colonial dynamics within the Soviet system and the enduring resilience of its diverse communities.

== Production ==
The film is promoted by Archivio Audiovisivo del Movimento Operaio e Democratico and produced by Essential Filmproduktion, Kino Produzioni, Rai Cinema and Luce Cinecittà, Société Parisienne de Production, and Studio Uljana Kim. The digitization and restoration was done by Archivio audiovisivo del movimento operaio e democratico, Luce Cinecittà, and Cineteca Nazionale, Italy. It is edited without voiceover or commentary and was in production in February 2026.

== Release ==
Imperium premiered out of competition at the 2026 Venice International Film Festival on 5 September 2026. Subsequently it competed at the 2026 BFI London Film Festival on 11 October 2026, on the same day, it was also showcased in the 'Histories of Cinema' section of the 2026 Festival du nouveau cinéma.

On 28 October, it will be screened in the 'Time of History' section of the 71st Valladolid International Film Festival.

Coproduction Office an international sales company, has acquired the sales rights of the film in February 2026.

== Accolades ==
Award ceremony	Date of ceremony	Category	Recipient(s)	Result	Ref.
BFI London Film Festival	18 October 2026	Best Film	Imperium	Won	
