= Preparations to Be Together for an Unknown Period of Time =

2020 film

- Theatrical release poster
- Directed by: Lili Horvát
- Produced by: Dóra Csernátony; Lili Horvát; Péter Miskolczi
- Starring: Natasa Stork
- Cinematography: Róbert Maly
- Edited by: Károly Szalai
- Release dates: 6 September 2020 (Venice); 24 September 2020 (Hungary)
- Running time: 95 minutes
- Country: Hungary
- Languages: Hungarian; English

Preparations to Be Together for an Unknown Period of Time (Hungarian: Felkészülés meghatározatlan ideig tartó együttlétre) is a 2020 Hungarian drama film directed by Lili Horvát. The film concerns a doctor who leaves her life in the United States to return home to Budapest after falling in love with another doctor, but he claims never to have met her before. It was selected as the Hungarian entry for the Best International Feature Film at the 93rd Academy Awards, but it was not nominated.

== Plot ==
At a conference in New Jersey, accomplished neurosurgeon Márta has an encounter with fellow doctor János. The brief meeting convinces Márta that he is the love of her life, and the two arrange a second meeting at the Liberty Bridge in Budapest in one month's time. Quitting her job in America and returning to her native Hungary, Márta is shocked when János does not arrive at their meeting spot. Heading to Budapest Medical University to confront him, the man she identifies as János tells her that the two have never met before.

Deciding to stay in Budapest, Márta rents a run-down apartment and takes a job at the hospital János works at. There, she draws ire from her colleagues due to her attitude and tendency to offer alternative diagnoses of the hospital's patients. She becomes obsessed with János, watching old videos she can find of him on YouTube and following him after work. She begins to see a therapist as she starts to doubt whether the initial meeting really took place and seeks a personality disorder diagnosis.

While operating on a patient, Márta grows irritated with one of her fellow surgeons and asks that János take over from him. The two are formally introduced, and Márta is invited to János's book release that evening. She returns home with a copy of his book and begins to masturbate after reading from it.

The son of Márta's earlier patient offers to buy her dinner as a thanks for her help. He tries to invite himself into her apartment afterwards, but she rejects him. She finds a message in her office from János asking to talk; the two go shopping together and he offers to buy her a speaker for her apartment. János later visits her apartment and the two have sex, but in the morning, he is nowhere to be found.

Helen, a friend and colleague of Márta's from New Jersey, visits her in Budapest. Helen convinces Márta to try calling János, but when she does Helen finds his jacket and phone inside Márta's apartment. Márta returns the item to the Budapest Medical University, then secretly follows János home. She quickly leaves when the door is answered by a young woman who says that she is János's daughter.

János tries to visit Márta but cannot access her apartment. He confesses that he did remember their meeting in New Jersey but did not think the arrangement to meet again in Budapest was serious; he also tells her that he is afraid of upsetting his relationship with his daughters as a single father. In the morning, János and Márta watch as two delivery men hoist a speaker up to Márta's apartment.

== Cast ==
- Natasa Stork as Vizy Márta
- Viktor Bodó as Drexler János
- Benett Vilmányi as Alex
- Zsolt Nagy as Kriván Barna
- Péter Tóth as Pszichiáter
- Andor Lukáts as Dr. Fried

== Reception ==
Review aggregator Rotten Tomatoes gives the film an 88% approval rating based on 56 reviews, with an average rating of 7/10. The website's critics consensus reads: "Its title may be unwieldy, but Preparations to Be Together for an Unknown Period of Time looks at the nature of love with commendable clarity." According to Metacritic, which sampled 12 critics and calculated a weighted average score of 70 out of 100, the film received "generally favorable reviews".

=== Accolades ===
Award	Date of ceremony	Category	Recipient(s)	Result	Ref(s)
Chicago International Film Festival	25 October 2020	Gold Hugo Award in New Directors Competition	Lili Horvat	Won	
Independent Spirit Awards	22 April 2021	Best International Film	Preparations to Be Together for an Unknown Period of Time	Nominated	

== See also ==
- List of submissions to the 93rd Academy Awards for Best International Feature Film
- List of Hungarian submissions for the Academy Award for Best International Feature Film
