= Thomas Vroege =

- Born: 1988; Netherlands
- Occupation: Film director

Thomas Vroege (born 1988) is a Dutch film director.

Vroege studied at the Sint Joost Academy of Arts. His debut documentary short The Son&The Stranger won the Wildcard award from the Netherlands Filmfund.

His 2015 short 9 days: From My Window in Aleppo, co-directed with Floor Van Der Meulen and Issa Touma, won Best European Short Film at the 29th European Short Film Awards as well as Best Short at the BFI Film Festival in London. In collaboration with Touma and Van Der Meulen, he also made his 2017 short Greetings from Aleppo. The film won the DIG award in Italy in 2017 and the DirectorsNL Award in the Netherlands in 2018.

== Filmography ==
- 2012 – The Son&The Stranger;
- 2015 – So Help Me God (doc);
- 2015 – 9 days: From My Window in Aleppo (doc short);
- 2017 – Greetings from Aleppo;
- 2020 – We hebben ‘m!!.
