= My Notes on Mars =

2026 science fiction romance film by Lili Horvát

- Directed by: Lili Horvát
- Written by: Lili Horvát
- Produced by: Lili Horvát; Dóra Csernátony; Emilie Georges; Naima Abed; Alexander Dumreicher-Ivanceanu; Bady Minck; Mirsad Purivatra; Johan Marjanovic; Evan Moore
- Starring: Rupert Friend; Mackenzie Davis
- Cinematography: Róbert Maly
- Edited by: Károly Szalai
- Music by: Gábor Keresztes
- Production companies: Amour Fou; Obala Art Centar; AmorFortuna
- Release date: 2 September 2026 (Venice)
- Running time: 111 minutes
- Countries: Hungary; Austria
- Language: English

My Notes on Mars is a 2026 science-fiction romance film written and directed by Lili Horvát, in her English-language debut feature. A co-production of Hungary and Austria, it stars Rupert Friend and Mackenzie Davis.

The film had its world premiere as the opening film of the Giornate degli Autori section of the 83rd Venice International Film Festival on 2 September 2026.

== Premise ==
A brilliant scientist, Margot, mysteriously disappears while hiking with her husband Sam and friends. Weeks later Margot reappears on the day of her own memorial service, but is changed. Sam sees this as a chance to rekindle their marriage, and rediscover their relationship.

== Cast ==
- Mackenzie Davis as Margot
- Rupert Friend as Sam

== Production ==
The film marks the English-language feature debut from director Lili Horvát. Horvát directed from her own script and produced with Dóra Csernátony for Poste Restante along with Emilie Georges and Naima Abed of Paradise City, Alexander Dumreicher-Ivanceanu and Bady Minck of Amour Fou and Mirsad Purivatra and Jovan Marjanovic of Obala Art Center, as well as Evan Moore of AmorFortuna. The film received support from the National Film Institute of Hungary.

MIT planetary scientist Gaia Stucky de Quay served as the film's planetary science consultant.

Greta Lee and Andrew Scott initially joined the cast in August 2024. Later, Lee and Scott exited the film, with Mackenzie Davis and Rupert Friend replacing them.

Principal photography began in July 2025 with filming locations including Budapest, Vienna and the Austrian Alps.

== Release ==
It will have its world premiere at the 83rd Venice International Film Festival as the opening film of the Giornate Degli Autori section. In October 2026, it will compete at the 2026 BFI London Film Festival in official competition.
