= Filmex =

Los Angeles International Film Exposition

Los Angeles International Film Exposition
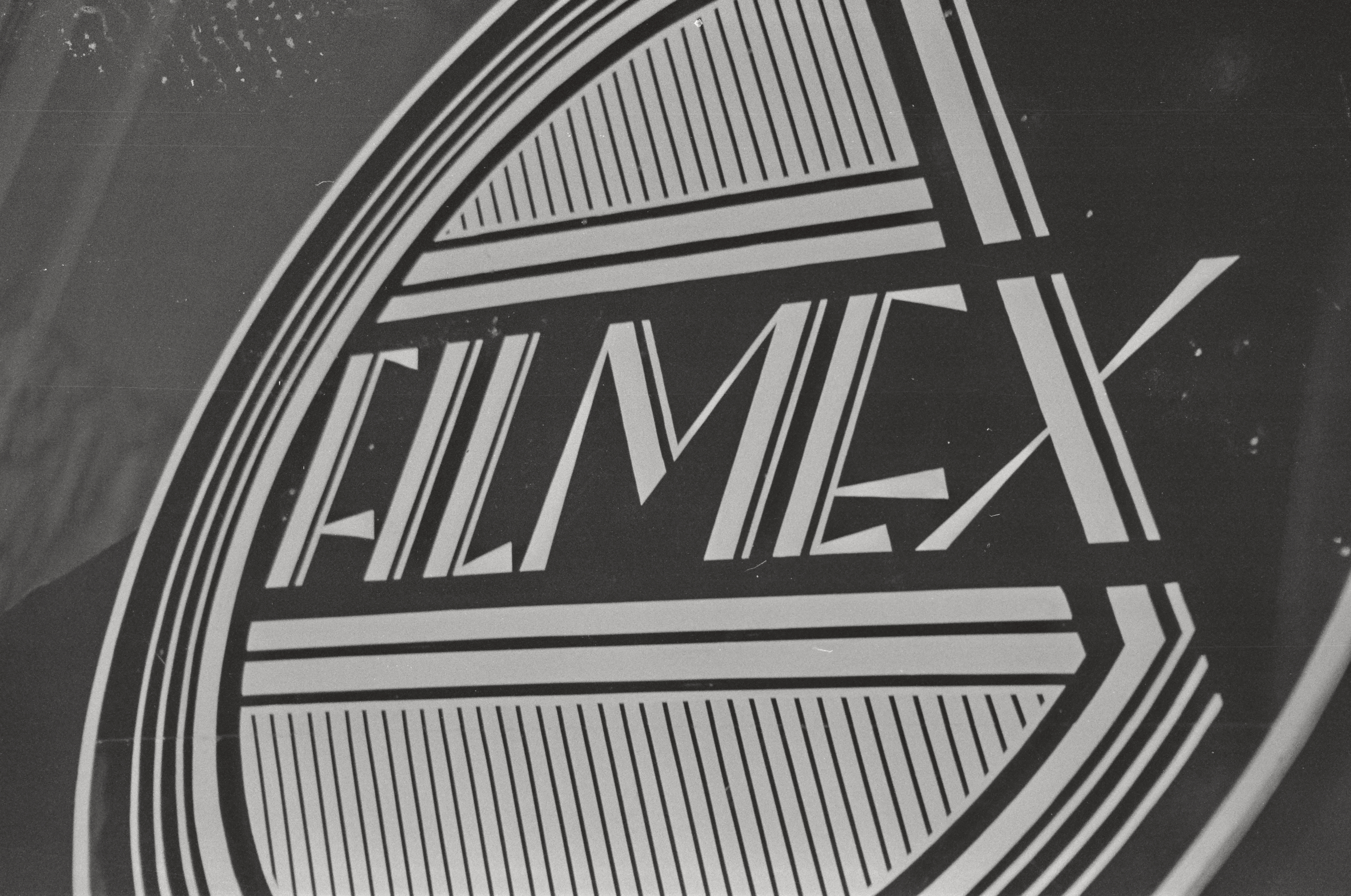
- Founded: 1970
- Founder: Gary Essert; George Cukor; Philip Chamberlin
- Dissolved: 1987
- Location: Los Angeles, California, United States

The Los Angeles International Film Exposition, also called Filmex, was an annual Los Angeles film festival held in the 1970s and early 1980s. It was co-founded by Gary Essert, George Cukor and Philip Chamberlin in 1970.

In 1976, Alfred Hitchcock was the first person to receive the Filmex Trustees Award.

In 1983, co-founder Essert was forced to resign due to the festival's budget problems and disagreements with the board of trustees over policy. In his place, Suzanne McCormick was named as executive director and Ken Wlaschin as artistic director.

In 1985, Jerry Weintraub became chairman and chief executive of the board promising to make Filmex the world's number 1 film festival. Later in 1985, Weintraub became chairman and chief executive officer at United Artists and in 1986, Weintraub decided that responsibility for Filmex had to be shared and that it needed to merge with either the American Film Institute or American Cinematheque, the latter having been formed by Essert in 1984 after he left Filmex. The board voted to merge with American Cinematheque and all Filmex staff were laid off except Wlaschin. However, the board of the American Cinematheque wouldn't approve the deal until Filmex's debts were cleared. No Filmex took place in 1986 and in January 1987, the American Film Institute launched the AFI Fest Los Angeles to take the place of Filmex with Wlaschin named as director of the new festival. The Institute paid Filmex a fee to take over the date. The Filmex Society, whose benefits included allowing members to attend advanced studio screenings, continued, with privileges extended to the AFI Fest.

== Filmex timeline ==
=== 1971 ===
- The First Los Angeles International Film Exposition, a.k.a. Filmex, launched with the West Coast premiere of The Last Picture Show at Grauman's Chinese Theatre on November 4.
- Andy Warhol's Women In Revolt premiered as Sex at Grauman's Chinese Theatre.
- Gary Essert is Director, and Gary Abrahams, Associate Director, for the 10-day event.
- The Academy of Motion Picture Arts and Sciences, the Los Angeles County Museum of Art, the Harold Lloyd Foundation, USC, UCLA, CalArts and the AFI all lend their support to the Festival, which intends to broaden appreciation for the work of "filmmakers from around the world".

=== 1972 ===
- Young Winston opens Filmex '72 at the Grauman's Chinese Theatre.
- A 24-hour Billy Wilder Marathon is held.
- Myrna Loy appears for a tribute in her honor.
- The Discreet Charm of the Bourgeoisie closes Filmex '72, and Luis Buñuel attends his first-ever public screening of one of his films.
- Filmex announces it will move to the spring for 1974 in order to generate greater support.

=== 1974 ===
- Filmex produces The Movies, a four-hour movie scrapbook for ABC to benefit the Motion Picture & Television Fund.
- Filmex '74 is held March 28-April 9 at the El Capitan Theatre, then called the Hollywood Paramount Theatre.
- Richard Lester's The Three Musketeers is the Opening Night film, March 28 at the Paramount Theatre.
- Andy Warhol's Flesh for Frankenstein had its US premiere in 3-D, with an on-stage musical introduction by the Mystic Knights of the Oingo Boingo.

=== 1975 ===
- Filmex '75 moves to the Plitt Theatres in Century City.
- The 14-day Festival opens with the premiere of Funny Lady and the Filmex Society Benefit Ball. Rosalind Russell and LA Mayor Tom Bradley opened the event. Those in attendance at the Plitt Century Plaza Theater premiere that evening included Roddy McDowall and Henry Winkler. Barbra Streisand did not attend the event. When Rosalind Russell exited the theater that night with her husband, she was heard to proclaim, "Well, that was fun, wasn't it!" She clearly disliked the movie, but was too much of a lady to say so. Peter Bonerz of The Bob Newhart Show was also present at the event. Yellow roses were in place on all tables during the post-screening dinner. Opening night attendees were given a copy of the "Funny Lady" soundtrack, which was the debut release from Arista Records. It was stamped with "For Promotion Only" in gold type.
- Irene Dunne had a tribute on March 23, hosted by Roddy McDowall. The evening included a screening of her 1939 movie Love Affair.
- Twenty-five nations participate in the Festival, and all five nominees for Best Foreign Language Film are shown.
- A 50-hour Science Fiction movie marathon is held on March 15–17. The marathon includes the world premiere of A Boy and His Dog which is based on the Harlan Ellison short story. Other movies include: 2001: A Space Odyssey; 20,000 Leagues Under the Sea; The Bed-Sitting Room; Metropolis; The Mysterious Island; Things to Come; The Day the Earth Stood Still; The Thing from Another World; The War of the Worlds; This Island Earth; Forbidden Planet; La jetée; Invasion of the Body Snatchers; Solaris; 20 Million Miles to Earth; Fahrenheit 451; The Illustrated Man; Je t'aime, je t'aime; Silent Running; Dark Star; Idaho Transfer; Late August at the Hotel Ozone; and many more.
- The official festival poster features a scene from "The War of the Worlds" showing Los Angeles City Hall about to be destroyed by a Martian spacecraft.

=== 1976 ===
- A Bicentennial Extravaganza opens the spring Filmex '76.
- Alfred Hitchcock drives up in a Universal tour bus for the premiere of his Family Plot on Opening Night. Hitchcock becomes the first person to be awarded the Filmex Trustees Award. At the gala ball at the Century Plaza Hotel following the screening, Hitchcock gives a speech in which he decries a line attributed to him that "actors are cattle." That evening, Hitchcock said, "What I probably said was, 'Actors should be treated like cattle.'"; He was feted by several celebrities before his speech, including James Stewart. Those who attended were given a clear plastic paperweight with Hitchcock's famous caricature on one side and the Family Plot poster on the other.
- A tribute to Cuban Cinema is held, which generates controversy.
- A Cowboy Film Marathon is held, screening 48 films. George Stevens, Jr. speaks after a showing of his father's film Shane.
- On December 18, 1976, Filmex holds the world premiere for Barbra Streisand's A Star Is Born at the Mann's Village Theater in Westwood Village. The stars, including Streisand, are in attendance with a post-event party at Dillons, at the time a new disco in the Westwood area. Ryan O'Neal, Peter Bogdanovich, Marisa Berenson, Alan Carr, Chevy Chase and Funny Girl composer Jule Styne are among the guests. The theme was "A Night in White," with many of the guests garbed in white attire. Streisand, dressed in all black, entered the screening just before the lights went down protected by a "V" of guards who protected her path to her seat at the front of the theater. Gossip columnist Rona Barrett and her husband were in attendance in the back left of the theater. After the screening, guests walked several blocks in a roped off area to Dillons disco in Westwood. The top floor of Dillons was restricted to Streisand and her party. Tina Turner was turned away from gaining access, along with several other guests. Celebrity photographer Alan Light, then a teenager, took several photos of attendees in the lobby of the Westwood Village while standing on a table near the entrance. He and his mother were somehow able to gain access later in the evening to Streisand's upper level restricted area of Dillons.

=== 1977 ===
- Passing Through by Larry Clark
- Filmex '77 is dedicated to Rosalind Russell, who had died that year.
- A 48-hour Movie Musical Marathon is held.
- Animato by Mike Jittlov
- Eraserhead premieres at midnight on March 19. This was the uncut version, and much of this edit was lost when David Lynch recut the film in response to feedback from this first version.
- AFI debuts a special section called AFI Critics Choice.
- Annie Hall is the Closing Night film.

=== 1978 ===
- Filmex announces that in its first seven years, 48 films were acquired for distribution after Festival exposure.
- The festival's theme is animation, with several screenings of animated films featured, organized, and programed by Steven Paul Leiva.
- In keeping with the overall salute to animation, the first known retrospective of animated television commercials (1948-1978) is the first of four special screenings compiled by James Hall, shorts and documentary selection committee member since 1975; with film and advertising industry artists attending a post-screening reception sponsored by Advertising Age magazine.
- Lillian Gish appears at the screening of Broken Blossoms.
- In-person tributes are held for Norman Jewison and Olivia de Havilland.
- Filmex '78 salutes Oscar's 50th anniversary with a 50-hour film marathon.

=== 1979 ===
- Laurence Olivier makes an emotional appearance on Closing Night with his film A Little Romance. He receives the Filmex Trustees Award.
- Sterling Hayden makes an appearance during a retrospective of his films including Dr. Strangelove or: How I Learned to Stop Worrying and Love the Bomb.
- A retrospective of films from the University of Southern California's Division of Cinema on the 50th anniversary of the country's first film school was compiled by shorts and documentary selection committees member James Hall; a post-screening reception was sponsored by producer and USC graduate Gary Kurtz

=== 1980 ===
- The Great Rock 'n' Roll Swindle plays at Filmex '80.
- A tribute to Paul Robeson is presented.
- The first theatrical retrospective of political television commercials was compiled by documentary and shorts selection committees member James Hall, featuring 30 years of presidential and local TV ads
- The Mighty Movie Marathon

=== 1981 ===
- Filmex '81, the 10th anniversary, is held at nine different locations around Hollywood in Los Angeles.
- The opening night gala was a financial disaster.
- A Special Section called "Treasures from AFI" is presented.
- The "Scared To Death" 50-hour Horror Film Marathon is held.
- Loretta Young is saluted with a tribute.
- The first theatrical retrospective of classic television commercials was compiled by documentary and shorts committees member James Hall for a screening at the Fairfax Theatre. From this program, Hall created three TV "specials" for NBC-TV ("Television's Greatest Commercials" 1982-1983).
- Elizabeth Taylor is awarded the Filmex Trustees Award at the Ahmanson Theatre. A dinner-dance is also held at the Dorothy Chandler Pavilion and the $90,000 proceeds of both are earmarked for the creation of a cinematheque with the declared aim that it will eventually build on the work of Filmex and provide year-round film programming of classic and new films from around the world at the Los Angeles Film Center.

=== 1982 ===
- The Loveless, Eating Raoul, The Secret Policeman's Other Ball, Chan Is Missing, Cat People, Das Boot, Diva and Coup de Torchon top the list of films screened at Filmex '82.
- Natalie Wood is remembered with a tribute, shortly after her death.
- Victor Victoria has a splashy premiere.
- Tom Laughlin joins the board of trustees, giving a $100,000 matching grant to help finance the festival.
- Essert is accused by the LA Times of mismanagement and fiscal irresponsibility and of alienating some of the board.

=== 1983 ===
- Several theaters along Wilshire Boulevard are used for Filmex '83.
- James Mason is honored with a tribute.
- Around the World in 80 Days is the closing film.
- Tom Pollock steps down as chairman of the board. Mike Medavoy also leaves as corporate president.
- William Magee becomes chairman and Laughlin becomes president.
- Essert is forced to resign after disagreements with the board of trustees. He is replaced by Suzanne McCormick and Ken Wlaschin. Laughlin also steps down.

=== 1984 ===
- Under the Volcano opened the festival.
- The festival featured an Olympic-themed program of sports films to tie in with the 1984 Summer Olympics in Los Angeles in collaboration with the Olympic Arts Festival.
- Essert and Abrahams form American Cinematheque.

=== 1985 ===
- The festival was held at the Mann Triplex in Westwood.
- Mask was due to be the opening night film but was withdrawn by Universal Pictures.
- It opened with A Private Function and closed with Almost You.
- Jerry Weintraub appointed as chairman and chief executive of the board of trustees. Magee is named president.

=== 1986 ===
- Filmex's board of trustees votes to merge with the American Cinematheque however, the merger does not go through.
- All Filmex staff are laid off other than Wlaschin.
- The 1986 festival was cancelled.

=== 1987 ===
- AFI Fest is launched in Filmex's slot in March with Wlaschin as the festival's director.
