= Concrete Turned to Sand =

2026 Canadian documentary film

- Directed by: Jessica Johnson; Ryan Ermacora
- Written by: Jessica Johnson
- Produced by: Jessica Johnson; Ryan Ermacora
- Cinematography: Jeremy Cox
- Music by: Scott Gailey
- Production company: Slag Pile Films
- Release date: April 29, 2026 (Hot Docs)
- Running time: 73 minutes
- Country: Canada
- Language: English

Concrete Turned to Sand is a Canadian documentary film, directed by Jessica Johnson and Ryan Ermacora and released in 2026. The film profiles oyster farmers working in the Discovery Islands region of British Columbia.

The film premiered on April 29, 2026, at the Hot Docs Canadian International Documentary Festival, followed by a screening on May 6 at the DOXA Documentary Film Festival. It had its international premiere at the 2026 BFI London Film Festival.
