= Les Arcs Film Festival =

French Film festival

- Location: Les Arcs, France
- Founded: 2009
- Founded by: Pierre-Emmanuel Fleurantin, Guillaume Calop, Jérémy Zelnik
- Artistic director: Frédéric Boyer

Les Arcs Film Festival is an annual European film festival held every December in Les Arcs in the French Alps.

== Profile ==
Les Arcs was co-founded in 2009 by Pierre-Emmanuel Fleurantin (CEO), Guillaume Calop (general manager), and Jérémy Zelnik (head of industry), on the grounds of the ski resort of the same name. The mountain location dictated the overall atmosphere of the event, despite aiming to be of international importance, Les Arcs does not split the audience from the professionals and maintains an open and equal environment. By 2018, the event's budget reached €1 m.

The festival's main award is the Crystal Arrow. At the 5th edition, the Femme de Cinema award was established. Other festival awards include the Best Actress and Best Actor prizes, Best Original Score, Best Cinematography, Cineuropa Andrea D'Aquino Award, Youth Jury Prize, Audience Award, Les cinglés du cinéma award, Universciné award for the Hauteur selection, Best Short Film Award, and Special Mention.

Apart from the main competition, the festival features such sections as Oscars on skis, Playtime, Hauteurs, Focus, and a recurring professional event — the Industry Village that aims to promote European cinema and aid emerging filmmakers. In 2018, the Talent Village was established for training of future cinema professionals. Along with Norwegian International Film Festival, Karlovy Vary, and Thessaloniki, Les Arcs participates in the Eurimages Lab Project Award that offers its winner a 50,000 euros cash prize.

== Editions ==
The 10th edition of Les Arcs Film Festival took place on 15–22 December 2018.

The 12th edition of Les Arcs took place on 12–19 December 2020, during the COVID-19 pandemic and was organized in a hybrid mode. Titled Off-Piste, the 12th edition made 80% of the screening online, while some professional events took place on site, and the Industry Village was relocated to Paris.

The 15th edition took place on 16–23 December 2023, at the Savoyard resort. The jury, presided by director Asghar Farhadi, included actress Rebecca Marder, actor Vincent Lacoste, composer Irène Drésel and novelist Christine Angot. The Swedish director Ruben Östlund became the Talent Village tutor. The 15th edition hosted a lot of high guests, including Isabelle Huppert, Jonathan Cohen, Vincent Macaigne, Joachim Lafosse, Matthias Schoenaerts, and Michel Hazanavicius. The Crystal Arrow went to Lithuanian director Marija Kavtaradze for her feature Slow. The TitraFilm award was won by Little Trouble Girls, a debut feature by Urška Djukić.

The 16th edition took place on 14-21 December, 2024. Happy Days by Dutch director Floor Van Der Meulen won the Eurimages Co-Production Development Prize.
