= Sydney Film Festival =

Annual film festival held in Sydney, Australia

- Location: Sydney, Australia
- Founded: 1954
- Awards: Sydney Film Prize
- Directors: Nashen Moodley
- Website: sff.org.au

Current: 73rd Sydney Film Festival
- 74th 72nd

The Sydney Film Festival is an annual competitive film festival held in Sydney, Australia, usually over 12 days in June. A number of awards are given, the top one being the Sydney Film Prize.

As of 2026, the festival's director is Nashen Moodley.

== History ==
In 1950, representatives of film societies in New South Wales and Victoria met in Sydney to discuss setting up a non-competitive film festival based on the Edinburgh International Film Festival, which had been formed three years earlier, to bring foreign language films and minority appeal films to Australia as the films were not shown in many Australian cinemas. In January 1952, representatives from both states launched the first Australian film festival in the Melbourne suburb of Olinda, Victoria, connecting it with the annual meeting of the Australian Council of Film Societies. It was renamed the Melbourne Film Festival the following year.

It was soon decided that one festival was not sufficient for all of Australia and a committee sprang from the Film Users Association of New South Wales to establish a film festival in Sydney. The committee included Alan Stout, Professor of Philosophy at The University of Sydney, filmmakers John Heyer and John Kingsford Smith, and Federation of Film Societies secretary David Donaldson. Under the direction of Donaldson, the inaugural festival opened on 11 June 1954 and was held over four days, with screenings of nine films at Sydney University. Attendance was at full capacity with 1,200 tickets sold at one guinea each. The films included Roberto Rosselini's Germany, Year Zero, Jacques Tati's Jour de fête and Heyer's The Back of Beyond. Over the next few years, a new director was appointed for each festival. In 1957, the festival was moved to Spring (October).

By 1958, the festival attracted its first international sponsored guest, Paul Rotha, and advertising into the festival catalogue. The following year, due to declining attendances, the festival was moved back to Winter (June) and the program expanded to seventeen days and by 1960 exceeded 2,000 subscribers with the introduction of the Opening Night feature film and party. By 1961, the festival was screening 24 films a year.

In 1962, Ian Klava was named the festival's first full-time director and he started to show more mainstream films, including the Australian premieres of Stanley Kubrick's Dr. Strangelove and William Wyler's The Collector. In 1965, Klava resigned and was replaced by David Stratton.

From inception until 1967, the University remained the annual home of the festival. The following year, the festival moved to the Wintergarden in Rose Bay where it remained for the ensuing five years. The historic State Theatre became the home of the festival in 1974, and remains one of the festival venues to date.

Censorship difficulties arose in the mid-1960s and continued until such time as the festival was granted exemption from censorship in 1971.

In 1970, a short film competition was established.

In 1983, Rod Webb replaced Stratton as festival director.

In 2007, the festival introduced a series of live gigs, shows and cabaret-style screening at the nearby Metro Theatre.

Owing to the COVID-19 pandemic in Australia, the 2020 festival staged a reduced, online-only version, and in 2021 was delayed to open on 3 November with the audience limited first to 75 per cent capacity, increasing to 100 per cent from 8–21 November. The films were also available online.

== Description ==
The competitive film festival draws international and local attention, with films being showcased in several venues across the city centre, and includes features, documentaries, short films, retrospectives, films for families and animations. Films are shown at venues across the Sydney CBD, with films shown at Event Cinemas in George Street, the Art Gallery of New South Wales, the Sydney Opera House Playhouse, Dendy Newtown, Palace Cinemas, Ritz Cinemas, Sydney Town Hall, as well as the State Theatre.

As of 2026 the festival's director is Nashen Moodley, who commenced in early 2012, replacing Clare Stewart.

Patrons of the festival include Gillian Armstrong, Cate Blanchett, Jane Campion, Nicole Kidman, Baz Luhrmann, George Miller, and Sam Neill among others.

== Competition and film prizes ==
Although a small number of prizes existed from the mid–1980s, prior to 2007, the Sydney Film Festival was classified by the International Federation of Film Producers Associations (FIAPF) as a Non-Competitive Feature Film Festival. On 10 September 2007, the Festival announced it had received funding from the New South Wales Government to host an official international competition, which rewarded "new directions in film". The FIAFP has since classified the Sydney Film Festival as a Competitive Specialised Feature Film Festival.

As of 2024 the total prize pool was worth A$200,000. Prizes were awarded in the following categories:

- Sydney Film Prize (awarded to the most "audacious, cutting-edge, and courageous" film in the Official Competition; endorsed by FIAPF): A$60,000 cash prize
- Sydney UNESCO City of Film Award (for a filmmaker based in New South Wales "whose work stands for innovation, imagination and high impact"): A$10,000 cash prize
- Documentary Australia Award for Australian documentary: A$20,000 cash prize
- Sustainable Future Award: A$40,000 cash prize
- First Nations Award, supported by Truant Pictures (new in 2024; the largest cash prize for Indigenous filmmaking in the world, open to First Nations filmmakers from around the globe): A$35,000
- Dendy Awards for Australian Short Films:
  - Dendy Live Action Short Award: A$7,000 cash prize
  - Rouben Mamoulian Award for Best Director (named after Armenian-American film and theatre director Rouben Mamoulian, who first presented the award in 1974): A$7,000 cash prize
  - Yoram Gross Animation Award (sponsored by Sandra and Guy Gross in honour of Yoram Gross): A$7,000 cash prize
  - AFTRS Craft Award: A$7,000 cash prize
- Event Cinemas Rising Talent Award
- GIO Audience awards (announced in the week after the festival):
  - Audience Award for Best Australian Feature
  - Audience Award for Best Documentary
  - Audience Award for Best International Feature
  - Audience Award for Best International Documentary

Past awards have included:

- The CRC Award for Best Australian Feature-length Film with a Multicultural Perspective (presently sponsored by the Community Relations Commission For a Multicultural NSW) – established in 1992
- Peter Rasmussen Innovation Award – established in 2009

=== Winners of the Sydney Film Prize ===
Year	Film	Director	Production Country	Ref.
2008	Hunger	Steve McQueen	Ireland, United Kingdom	
2009	Bronson	Nicolas Winding Refn	United Kingdom	
2010	Heartbeats	Xavier Dolan	Canada	
2011	A Separation	Asghar Farhadi	Iran	
2012	Alps	Yorgos Lanthimos	Greece	
2013	Only God Forgives	Nicolas Winding Refn	Denmark, France	
2014	Two Days, One Night	Dardenne brothers	Belgium, France, Italy	
2015	Arabian Nights	Miguel Gomes	Portugal, France, Germany, Switzerland	
2016	Aquarius	Kleber Mendonça Filho	Brazil, France	
2017	On Body and Soul	Ildikó Enyedi	Hungary	
2018	The Heiresses	Marcelo Martinessi	Paraguay	
2019	Parasite	Bong Joon-ho	South Korea	
2020	Festival cancelled due to the COVID-19 outbreak			
2021	There Is No Evil	Mohammad Rasoulof	Germany, Czech Republic, Iran	
2022	Close	Lukas Dhont	Belgium, France, Netherlands	
2023	The Mother of All Lies	Asmae El Moudir	Morocco, Egypt, Qatar, Saudi Arabia	
2024	There's Still Tomorrow	Paola Cortellesi	Italy	
2025	It Was Just an Accident	Jafar Panahi	Iran, France, Luxembourg	
2026	Minotaur	Andrey Zvyagintsev	France, Latvia, Germany	

== Festival directors ==
- David Donaldson (1954–1957)
- Valwyn Edwards (1958)
- Sylvia Lawson and Robert Connell (1959)
- Lois Hunter (1960)
- Patricia Moore (1961)
- Ian Klava (1962–1965) – Inaugural full-time paid director
- David Stratton (1966–1983)
- Rod Webb (1984–1988)
- Paul Byrnes (1989–1998)
- Gayle Lake (1999–2004)
- Lynden Barber (2005–2006)
- Clare Stewart (2007–2011)
- Nashen Moodley (2012–present)

== See also ==
- Message Sticks Indigenous Film Festival

== Bibliography ==
- Gillan, Edward (designer) (1993). An Oral history of the Sydney Film Festival: 40 years of film. Sydney: Sydney Film Festival. p. 32. ISBN 0-9596235-1-5.
- Webber, Pauline (2005). A History of the Sydney Film Festival, 1954–1983 (PDF) (MA). University of Technology Sydney.
