= Sheila Whitaker =

English film programmer and writer

Sheila Hazel Whitaker (1 April 1936 – 29 July 2013) was an English film programmer and writer.

Whitaker was born in Thornton Heath, south London and grew up in the north of the city, and Manchester, Cardiff and Birmingham after the Second World War. She was appointed to oversee the British Film Institute's stills, posters and designs collections in 1968, leaving in 1975 to study for her degree in Comparative European Literature at Warwick University. At a difficult time for the venue, in 1979 she became director of the Tyneside Cinema in Newcastle, also running Tyneside Festival of Independent Cinema at the same time which she founded.

While head of programming of the National Film Theatre, a role she held from 1984–1990, Whitaker became director of the London Film Festival in 1987 in succession to Derek Malcolm. She remained as director until 1996, when her contract was not renewed by the BFI to Whitaker's disappointment. During her period as director, Whitaker continued the expansion of the festival started by Malcolm. By the end of her tenure as director, the LFF had grown to include screenings of over 200 films from around the world, more venues had been added and more tickets were sold to non-BFI members. She also began the festival's practice of including newly restored films from the National Film Archive and overseas institutions.

Whitaker was the director of International Programming for the Dubai International Film Festival from 2008; she had been a consultant for the event since 2004.

With others, she co-edited Life and Art: The New Iranian Cinema (1999), and An Argentine Passion, (2000) about the Argentinian film director María Luisa Bemberg.

Sheila Whitaker was a recipient of the Chevalier de l’Ordre des Arts et des Lettres for services to French cinema in Britain, an award which coincided with the end of her time as director of the London Film Festival, and received honorary doctorates from Newcastle and Warwick Universities. She died in London after suffering from motor neuron disease.
