= Lili Horvát =

Hungarian filmmaker (born 1982)

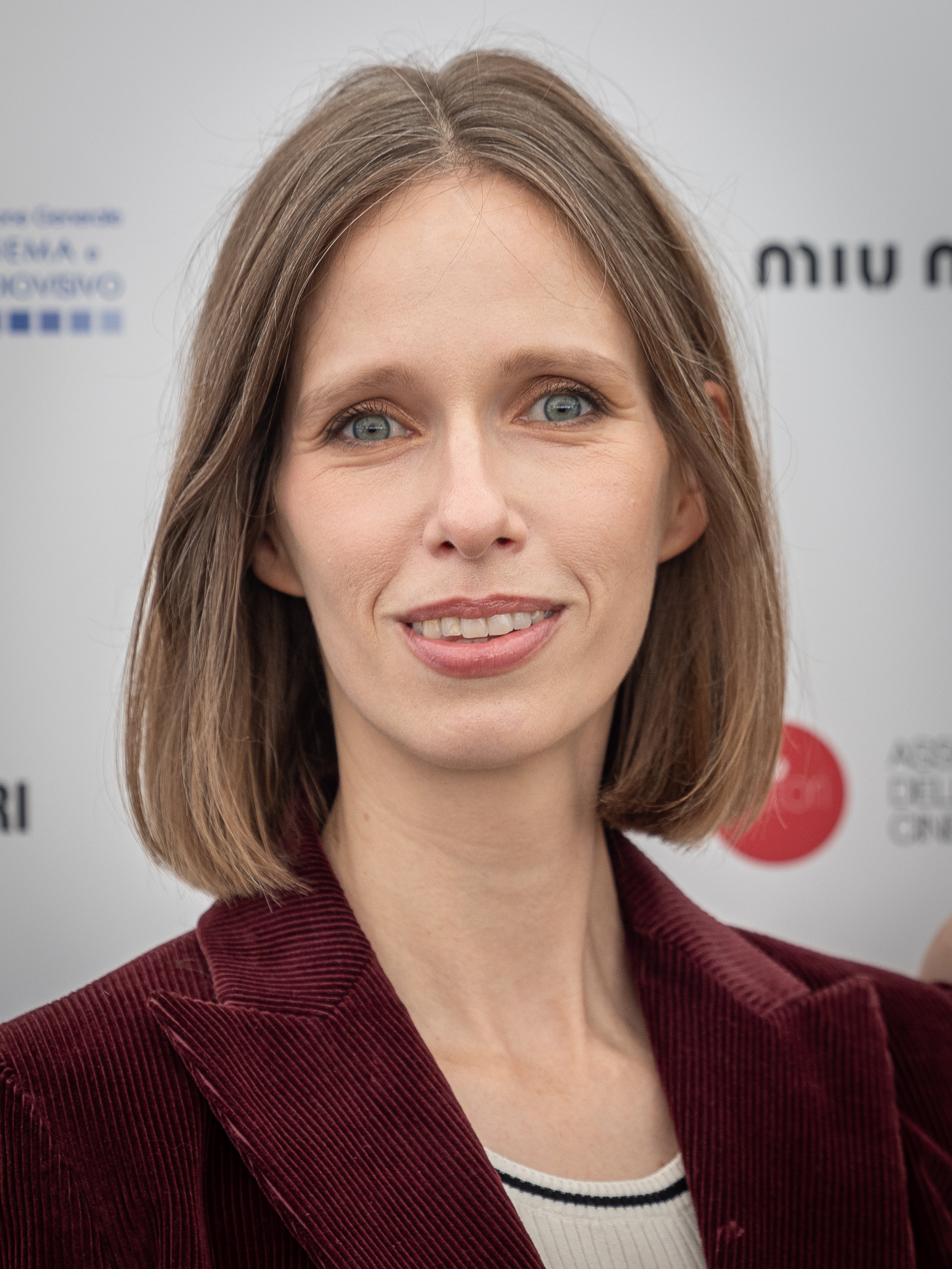
- Horvát in 2026
- Born: 1982; Budapest, Hungary
- Occupations: Director; Screenwriter

Lili Horvát (born in 1982) is a Hungarian film director, screenwriter, and producer.

== Career ==
Born in Budapest, Horvát studied audiovisual arts at Sorbonne Nouvelle University and film directing at the University of Theatre and Film Arts in Budapest. In 2015, she made her feature directorial debut with The Wednesday Child, which received the East of West Award at the 50th Karlovy Vary International Film Festival.

In 2016, Horvát co-founded Poste Restante, an independent production company. Her following film, Preparations to Be Together for an Unknown Period of Time, premiered at the 77th Venice International Film Festival in the Venice Days sidebar, and was chosen as the Hungarian entry for the Best International Feature Film at the 93rd Academy Awards.

In 2026, Horvát's first English-language film, My Notes on Mars, was selected as the opening film of the Giornate degli Autori section at the 83rd Venice International Film Festival.

== Filmography ==
- 2015 - The Wednesday Child (Szerdai gyerek)
- 2021 - Preparations to Be Together for an Unknown Period of Time (A feleségem története)
- 2026 - My Notes on Mars
