= 9 Temples to Heaven =

2026 film by Sompot Chidgasornpongse

- International promotional poster
- Thai: 9 วัด สู่สวรรค์
- Directed by: Sompot Chidgasornpongse
- Written by: Sompot Chidgasornpongse
- Produced by: Kissada Kamyoung; Apichatpong Weerasethakul
- Starring: Amara Ramnarong; Surachai Ningsanond; Jirawut Chiwaruck; Yaneenan Jiraphatjittrin; Klaichan Phunman; Sompop Songkampol
- Cinematography: Jonathan Ricquebourg
- Edited by: Tham Kattiyakul; Jirapat Mekkrajai; Daniel Hui; Sompot Chidgasornpongse
- Production companies: E&W Films; Kick the Machine; Petit Chaos; At A Time Pictures; Needle in the Haystack; La Fonte; Square One Film; Qun Films
- Release date: 19 May 2026 (Cannes)
- Running time: 140 minutes
- Countries: Thailand; Singapore; France; Norway; China; Hong Kong; Indonesia; Qatar
- Language: Thai

9 Temples to Heaven (Thai: 9 วัด สู่สวรรค์) is a 2026 drama film written and directed by Sompot Chidgasornpongse, in his feature directing debut. Starring Surachai Ningsanond and Amara Ramnarong, the film follows a Thai family of nine who set out to visit nine temples in a single day.

The film had its world premiere at the Directors' Fortnight section of the 2026 Cannes Film Festival on 19 May, where it was nominated for the Caméra d'Or. It was also selected as the Thai entry for Best International Feature Film at the 99th Academy Awards.

== Synopsis ==
After a fortuneteller predicts the imminent death of an elderly mother and grandmother, nine members of a Thai family undertake a pilgrimage to nine temples in one day.

== Cast ==
- Amara Ramnarong as Grandma
- Surachai Ningsanond as Sakol
- Jirawut Chiwaruck as Pongpol
- Yaneenan Jiraphatjittrin as Wimol
- Klaichan Phunman as Anchalee
- Sompop Songkampol as Tor
- Poon Sirapob as Koon
- Yada Karnjanisakorn as Yam
- Nichmon Shintadapong as Prae

== Production ==
9 Temples to Heaven was produced by Thai filmmaker Apichatpong Weerasethakul, to whom Chidgasornpongse had worked as assistant director in Tropical Malady (2004), Syndromes and a Century (2006), Cemetery of Splendour (2015), and Memoria (2021). It was also produced by Kick The Machine Films and At A Time (both in Thailand), with international co-production from E&W Films (Singapore), Petit Chaos (France), Needle in the Haystack (Norway), La Fonte (China), Square One Film (Hong Kong) and Qun Films (Indonesia).

The film marks Chidgasornpongse's fictional feature directing debut, following the documentary Mon Rot Fai (2016). French cinematographer Jonathan Ricquebourg was the director of photography.

== Release ==
The film had its world premiere at the Directors' Fortnight section of the 2026 Cannes Film Festival on 19 May, where it was nominated for the Caméra d'Or.

In June 2026, it was selected for the 73rd Sydney Film Festival, and was featured at the 28th Shanghai International Film Festival. It was also selected for the Main Slate of the 64th New York Film Festival, the 'Meeting Point' competition of the 71st Valladolid International Film Festival in Spain, and in competition at the 70th BFI London Film Festival.

International sales are handled by Playtime.

== Accolades ==
At the Shanghai International Film Festival in June 2026, Chidgasornpongse was named Best Director and Songkampol won the Best Actor prize in the Asian New Talent competition. 9 Temples to Heaven won the Sutherland Award in the First Feature Competition at the London Film Festival.

It was also selected as the Thai entry for Best International Feature Film at the 99th Academy Awards.

== See also ==
- List of submissions to the 99th Academy Awards for Best International Feature Film
- List of Thai submissions for the Academy Award for Best International Feature Film
