= Sutherland Trophy =

British film award

The Sutherland Trophy was created in 1958 by the British Film Institute (BFI) as an annual award for "the maker of the most original and imaginative [first or second] feature film introduced at the National Film Theatre during the year". The award was named after a patron of the BFI, George Sutherland-Leveson-Gower, 5th Duke of Sutherland.

== History ==
In 1997, the criteria changed to honour the maker of the most original and imaginative first feature screened during the London Film Festival.

The award is a sculpture in silver by Gerald Benney. It is presented on the closing night of the Festival.

== List of winners ==
Year	Director(s)	Film	Country
1958	Yasujirō Ozu	Tokyo Story	Japan
1959	Satyajit Ray	The World of Apu	India
1960	Michelangelo Antonioni	L'Avventura	Italy
1961	Ermanno Olmi	Il Posto	Italy
1962	Jacques Rivette	Paris Belongs to Us	France
1963	Alain Resnais	Muriel	France
1964	Grigori Kozintsev	Hamlet	Soviet Union
1965	Jean-Luc Godard	Pierrot le Fou	France
1966	André Delvaux	The Man Who Had His Hair Cut Short	Belgium
1967	Masaki Kobayashi	Samurai Rebellion	Japan
1968	Jean-Marie Straub and Danièle Huillet	The Chronicle of Anna Magdalena Bach	France
1969	Jacques Rivette	L'Amour fou	France
1970	Bernardo Bertolucci	The Conformist	Italy
1971	Robert Bresson	Four Nights of a Dreamer	France
1972	Octavio Getino and Fernando Solanas	The Hour of the Furnaces	Argentina
1973	Giorgi Shengelaia	Pirosmani	Soviet Union
1974	Rainer Werner Fassbinder	Martha	West Germany
1975	Theodoros Angelopoulos	The Travelling Players	Greece
1976	Nagisa Oshima	In the Realm of the Senses	Japan
1977	Hans-Jürgen Syberberg	Hitler: A Film from Germany	West Germany
1978	Mark Rappaport	The Scenic Route	United States
1979	Zeki Ökten and Yılmaz Güney	The Herd	Turkey
1980	Peter Greenaway (shared)	The Falls	United Kingdom
1980	Xie Jin (shared)	Two Stage Sisters	China
1981	Helma Sanders-Brahms	No Mercy, No Future	West Germany
1982	Adoor Gopalakrishnan	Elippathayam	India
1983	Chris Marker	Sans Soleil	France
1984	Lino Brocka	This Is My Country	Philippines
1985	Chen Kaige	Yellow Earth	China
1986	Bill Douglas	Comrades	United Kingdom
1987	Edward Yang (shared)	Terrorizers	Taiwan
1987	Souleymane Cissé (shared)	Yeelen	Mali
1989	Nils Gaup	Pathfinder	Norway
1990	Steve Kloves	The Fabulous Baker Boys	United States
1991	Elaine Proctor	On the Wire	South Africa
1992	Jocelyn Moorhouse	Proof	Australia
1993	Julio Medem	Vacas	Spain
1994	Tran Anh Hung	The Scent of Green Papaya	Vietnam
1995	Moufida Tlatli	The Silences of the Palace	Tunisia
1996	Jevon O'Neill	Bob's Weekend	United Kingdom
1997	Bruno Dumont	The Life of Jesus	France
1998	Samira Makhmalbaf	The Apple	Iran
1999	Lynne Ramsay	Ratcatcher	United Kingdom
2000	Kenneth Lonergan	You Can Count on Me	United States
2001	Asif Kapadia	The Warrior	United Kingdom
2002	Delphine Gleize	Carnages	France
2003	Siddiq Barmak	Osama	Afghanistan
2004	Jonathan Caouette	Tarnation	United States
2005	Kari Paljakka	For the Living and the Dead	Finland
2006	Andrea Arnold	Red Road	United Kingdom
2007	Vincent Paronnaud and Marjane Satrapi	Persepolis	France
2008	Sergey Dvortsevoy	Tulpan	Kazakhstan
2009	Scandar Copti and Yaron Shani	Ajami	Palestine
2010	Clio Barnard	The Arbor	United Kingdom
2011	Pablo Giorgelli	Las Acacias	Argentina
2012	Benh Zeitlin	Beasts of the Southern Wild	United States
2013	Anthony Chen	Ilo Ilo	Singapore
2014	Myroslav Slaboshpytskiy	The Tribe	Ukraine
2015	Robert Eggers	The Witch	United States
2016	Julia Ducournau	Raw	France
2017	John Trengove	The Wound	South Africa
2018	Lukas Dhont	Girl	Belgium
2019	Mati Diop	Atlantics	France
2021	Laura Wandel	Playground	Belgium
2022	Manuela Martelli	1976	Chile
2023	Mika Gustafson	Paradise Is Burning	Sweden
2024	Laura Carreira	On Falling	United Kingdom
2025	Vincho Nchogu	One Woman One Bra	Kenya
2026	Sompot Chidgasornpongse	9 Temples to Heaven	Thailand

== See also ==
- John Cassavetes Award
- Independent film
