= List of French films of 2014 =

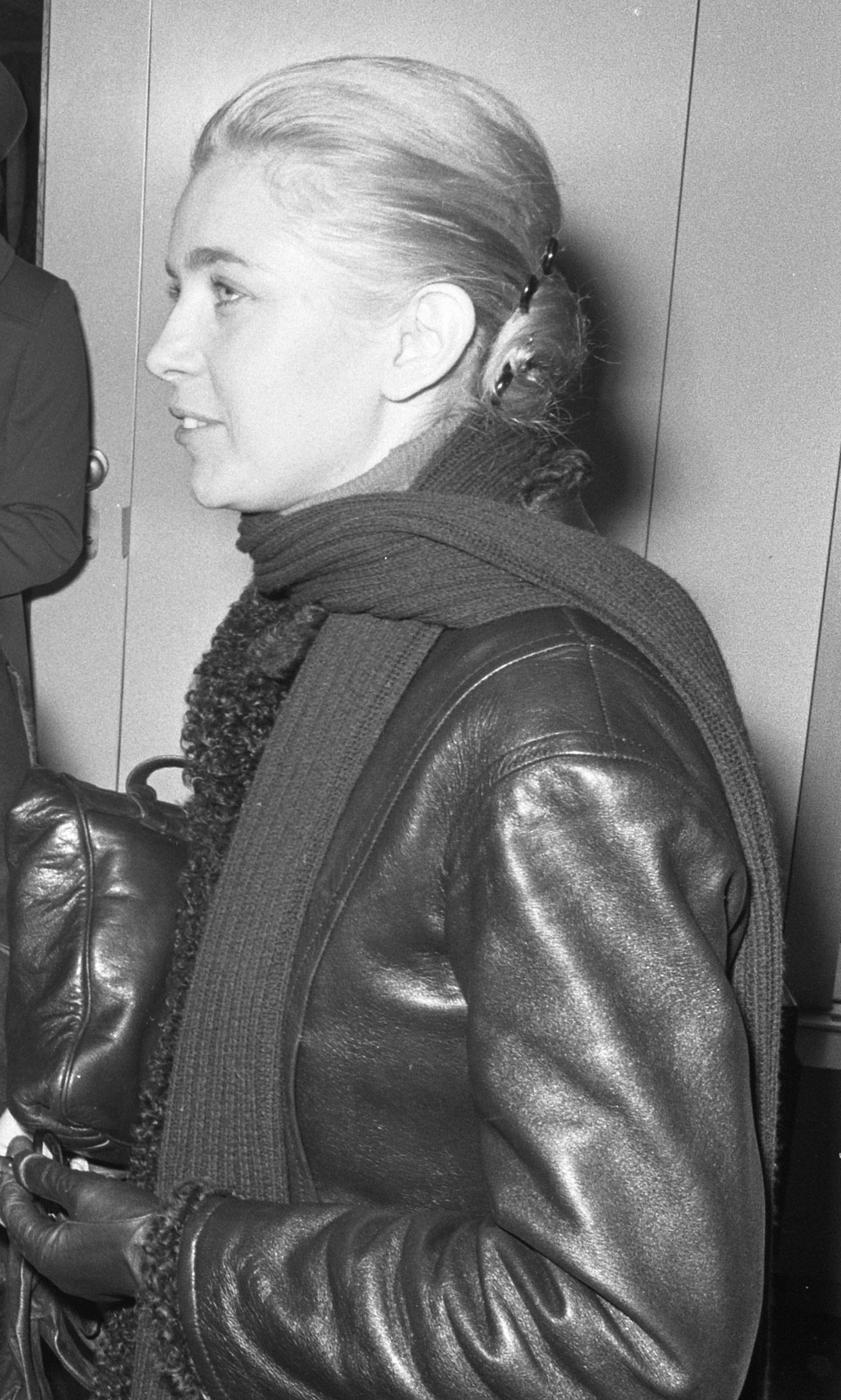
2014 saw the death of Marie Dubois.

The French film industry produced over four hundred feature films in 2014. This article fully lists all non-pornographic films, including short films, that had a release date in that year and which were at least partly made by France. It does not include films first released in previous years that had release dates in 2014.
Also included is an overview of the major events in French film, including film festivals and awards ceremonies, as well as lists of those films that have been particularly well received, both critically and financially.

== Major releases ==
=== January – March ===
Opening		Title	Cast and crew	Studio	Genre(s)	Ref.
J A N U A R Y	1	Never on the First Night	Director: Melissa Drigeard; Cast: Alexandra Lamy, Mélanie Doutey, Julie Ferrier	EuropaCorp	Comedy	
J A N U A R Y	8	Yves Saint Laurent	Director: Jalil Lespert; Cast: Pierre Niney, Guillaume Gallienne, Charlotte Le Bon, Laura Smet, Marie de Villepin	SND Films	Biography; Drama	
J A N U A R Y	15	Divin Enfant	Director: Olivier Doran; Cast: Émilie Dequenne, Sami Bouajila, Géraldine Pailhas	UGC Distribution	Comedy	
J A N U A R Y	17	To Kill a Man	Director: Alejandro Fernández Almendras; Cast: Daniel Antivilo, Daniel Candia, Ariel Mateluna, Alejandra Yáñez	Film Movement	Drama	
J A N U A R Y	18	Cold in July	Director: Jim Mickle; Cast: Michael C. Hall, Sam Shepard, Don Johnson	IFC Films	Crime; Drama	
J A N U A R Y	18	Love Is Strange	Director: Ira Sachs; Cast: Alfred Molina, John Lithgow, Marisa Tomei	Sony Pictures Classics	Drama	
J A N U A R Y	20	White Bird in a Blizzard	Director: Gregg Araki; Cast: Shailene Woodley, Eva Green, Christopher Meloni	Magnolia Pictures	Thriller; Drama	
J A N U A R Y	22	Lost in Karastan	Director: Ben Hopkins; Cast: Matthew Macfadyen, MyAnna Buring, Noah Taylor, Ali Cook	Brandstorm Entertainment AG	Comedy	
J A N U A R Y	27	Non-Stop	Director: Jaume Collet-Serra; Cast: Liam Neeson, Julianne Moore, Michelle Dockery	Universal Pictures	Action; Thriller; Mystery	
J A N U A R Y	29	Jacky in Women's Kingdom	Director: Riad Sattouf; Cast: Charlotte Gainsbourg, Vincent Lacoste, Noémie Lvovsky	Pathé	Comedy	
F E B R U A R Y	5	Mea Culpa	Director: Fred Cavayé; Cast: Vincent Lindon, Gilles Lellouche, Nadine Labaki	Gaumont	Thriller	
F E B R U A R Y	7	Two Men in Town	Director: Rachid Bouchareb; Cast: Forest Whitaker, Harvey Keitel, Ellen Burstyn, Luis Guzmán, Brenda Blethyn	Artists & Co	Drama	
F E B R U A R Y	8	If You Don't, I Will	Director: Sophie Fillières; Cast: Emmanuelle Devos, Mathieu Amalric, Joséphine de La Baume	Les Films du Losange	Comedy	
F E B R U A R Y	8	The Kidnapping of Michel Houellebecq	Director: Guillaume Nicloux; Cast: Michel Houellebecq, Mathieu Nicourt, Maxime Lefrançois, Luc Schwarz		Comedy; Drama	
F E B R U A R Y	9	Brides	Director: Tinatin Kajrishvili; Cast: Mari Kitia, Giorgi Maskharashvili	ADASTRA Films	Drama	
F E B R U A R Y	9	History of Fear	Director: Benjamín Naishtat; Cast: Jonathan Da Rosa		Drama	
F E B R U A R Y	9	Journey to the West	Director: Tsai Ming-liang; Cast: Lee Kang-sheng, Denis Lavant		Drama	
F E B R U A R Y	9	Stations of the Cross	Director: Dietrich Brüggemann; Cast: Hanns Zischler		Drama	
F E B R U A R Y	10	Blind Massage	Director: Lou Ye; Cast: Guo Xiaodong, Qin Hao, Zhang Lei		Drama	
F E B R U A R Y	10	Life of Riley	Director: Alain Resnais; Cast: Sandrine Kiberlain, André Dussollier, Sabine Azéma	Le Pacte	Drama	
F E B R U A R Y	11	In the Courtyard	Director: Pierre Salvadori; Cast: Catherine Deneuve, Gustave de Kervern	Wild Bunch	Drama; Comedy	
F E B R U A R Y	11	The Two Faces of January	Director: Hossein Amini; Cast: Viggo Mortensen, Kirsten Dunst, Oscar Isaac	Magnolia Pictures	Thriller	
F E B R U A R Y	12	3 Days to Kill	Director: McG; Cast: Kevin Costner, Amber Heard, Hailee Steinfeld	EuropaCorp	Action; Thriller	
F E B R U A R Y	12	Aloft	Director: Claudia Llosa; Cast: Jennifer Connelly, Cillian Murphy, Mélanie Laurent	Sony Pictures Classics	Drama	
F E B R U A R Y	12	Beauty and the Beast	Director: Christophe Gans; Cast: Vincent Cassel, Léa Seydoux, André Dussollier	Pathé	Fantasy, Romance	
F E B R U A R Y	12	Diplomacy	Director: Volker Schlöndorff; Cast: André Dussollier, Niels Arestrup	Gaumont	Historical; Drama	
F E B R U A R Y	12	Les Trois Frères, le retour	Director: Didier Bourdon, Bernard Campan; Cast: Didier Bourdon, Bernard Campan	Pan-Européenne	Comedy	
F E B R U A R Y	14	The Mystery of Dante	Director: Louis Nero; Cast: F. Murray Abraham, Taylor Hackford, Franco Zeffirelli, Christopher Vogler, Valerio Manfredi	L'Altrofilm	Biography; Historical; Mystery	
F E B R U A R Y	19	Le Crocodile du Botswanga	Directors: Lionel Steketee, Fabrice Eboué; Cast: Fabrice Eboué, Thomas N'Gijol, Ibrahim Koma, Claudia Tagbo	Mars Distribution	Comedy	
F E B R U A R Y	26	Supercondriaque	Director: Dany Boon; Cast: Dany Boon, Alice Pol, Kad Merad, Jean-Yves Berteloot	Pathé	Comedy	
F E B R U A R Y	27	Goal of the Dead	Director: Thierry Poiraud, Benjamin Rocher; Cast: Alban Lenoir, Charlie Bruneau, Tiphaine Daviot, Ahmed Sylla, Alexandre Philip	Luminor	Comedy; Horror	
M A R C H	7	Closer to the Moon	Director: Nae Caranfil; Cast: Vera Farmiga, Mark Strong, Harry Lloyd	Mandragora Movies	Comedy; Drama	
M A R C H	10	Among the Living	Directors: Alexandre Bustillo, Julien Maury; Cast: Béatrice Dalle, Anne Marivin, Nicolas Giraud	Tanzi Distribution	Horror	
M A R C H	12	Fiston	Director: Pascal Bourdiaux; Cast: Franck Dubosc, Kev Adams, Nora Arnezeder, Valérie Benguigui, Helena Noguerra	SND Films	Comedy	
M A R C H	12	Need for Speed	Director: Scott Waugh; Cast: Aaron Paul, Dominic Cooper, Scott Mescudi, Imogen Poots, Ramón Rodríguez, Michael Keaton	Walt Disney Studios Motion Pictures	Action; Thriller	
M A R C H	12	Son épouse	Director: Michel Spinosa; Cast: Yvan Attal, Janagi, Charlotte Gainsbourg, Mahesh, Laguparan, Nirupama Nityanadan, Jeroen Perceval	ex nihilo	Psychological drama	
M A R C H	26	Les Gazelles	Director: Mona Achache; Cast: Camille Chamoux, Audrey Fleurot, Joséphine de Meaux, Naidra Ayadi, Anne Brochet		Comedy	

=== April – June ===
Opening		Title	Cast and crew	Studio	Genre(s)	Ref.
A P R I L	2	La Crème de la crème	Director: Kim Chapiron; Cast: Thomas Blumenthal, Alice Isaaz, Jean-Baptiste Lafarge	Wild Bunch	Comedy; Drama	
A P R I L	9	Les Yeux jaunes des crocodiles	Director: Cécile Telerman; Cast: Julie Depardieu, Emmanuelle Béart, Alice Isaaz, Jacques Weber	Wild Bunch	Drama	
A P R I L	9	Une histoire banale	Director: Audrey Estrougo; Cast: Marie Denarnaud, Marie-Sohna Conde, Oumar Diaw, Renaud Astegiani	Damned Distribution	Drama	
A P R I L	16	Babysitting	Directors: Nicolas Benamou, Philippe Lacheau; Cast: Philippe Lacheau, Alice David, Vincent Desagnat	Universal Pictures International	Comedy	
A P R I L	16	Serial (Bad) Weddings	Director: Philippe de Chauveron; Cast: Christian Clavier, Chantal Lauby, Ary Abittan, Frédéric Chau, Frédérique Bel, Élodie Fontan	UGC Distribution	Comedy	
A P R I L	18	Match	Director: Stephen Belber; Cast: Patrick Stewart, Carla Gugino, Matthew Lillard	IFC Films	Drama	
A P R I L	23	Brick Mansions	Director: Camille Delamarre; Cast: Paul Walker, RZA, David Belle	Warner Bros.	Crime; Thriller	
A P R I L	23	Quantum Love	Director: Lisa Azuelos; Cast: Sophie Marceau, François Cluzet	Pathé	Romance	
A P R I L	26	96 Hours	Director: Frédéric Schoendoerffer; Cast: Niels Arestrup, Gérard Lanvin	ARP Sélection	Thriller	
A P R I L	26	Flare	Director: Yūkichi Ōtsuka; Cast: Mayuko Fukuda, Valentin Bonhomme, Alice Hirose	Eye Motion	Drama	
A P R I L	30	24 Days	Director: Alexandre Arcady; Cast: Zabou Breitman, Pascal Elbé, Jacques Gamblin, Sylvie Testud, Éric Caravaca, Syrus Shahidi, Tony Harrisson Mpoudja, Olivier Sitruk, Olivier Barthélémy	Paradis Films	Drama	
A P R I L	30	Barbecue	Director: Eric Lavaine; Cast: Lambert Wilson, Franck Dubosc, Florence Foresti, Guillaume de Tonquédec, Lionel Abelanski, Jérôme Commandeur	StudioCanal	Comedy	
A P R I L	30	Le Dernier Diamant	Director: Éric Barbier; Cast: Bérénice Bejo, Yvan Attal, Annie Cordy, Jean-François Stévenin, JoeyStarr		Drama	
A P R I L	30	Not My Type	Director: Lucas Belvaux; Cast: Émilie Dequenne, Loïc Corbery	AGAT Films	Romance	
M A Y	9	Rage	Director: Paco Cabezas; Cast: Nicolas Cage	Image Entertainment	Action; Crime; Thriller	
M A Y	14	Grace of Monaco	Director: Olivier Dahan; Cast: Nicole Kidman, Tim Roth, Frank Langella, Parker Posey, Milo Ventimiglia, Derek Jacobi, Paz Vega	The Weinstein Company	Biography; Drama	
M A Y	15	Faire: L'amour	Director: Djinn Carrénard; Cast: Azu, Laurette Lalande	ARP Sélection	Drama	
M A Y	15	Girlhood	Director: Céline Sciamma; Cast: Karidja Touré, Assa Sylla, Lindsay Karamoh, Mariétou Touré	Pyramide Distribution	Drama	
M A Y	15	Mr. Turner	Director: Mike Leigh; Timothy Spall, Lesley Manville, Roger Ashton-Griffiths, Joshua McGuire, Dorothy Atkinson	Entertainment One; Based on the life of J. M. W. Turner	Drama; Biography	
M A Y	15	Party Girl	Directors: Marie Amachoukeli, Claire Burger, Samuel Theis; Cast: Angélique Litzenburger, Joseph Bour	Pyramide Distribution	Drama	
M A Y	15	That Lovely Girl	Director: Keren Yedaya		Drama	
M A Y	15	Timbuktu	Director: Abderrahmane Sissako; Cast: Abel Jafri, Hichem Yacoubi	Arte France Cinéma	Drama	
M A Y	16	Gett: The Trial of Viviane Amsalem	Directors: Ronit Elkabetz, Shlomi Elkabetz; Cast: Ronit Elkabetz, Menashe Noy, Sasson Gabai, Simon Abkarian	Les Films du Losange	Drama	
M A Y	16	Insecure	Director: Marianne Tardieu; Cast: Reda Kateb, Adèle Exarchopoulos, Rashid Debbouze	Rézo Films	Drama	
M A Y	16	The Blue Room	Director: Mathieu Amalric; Cast: Mathieu Amalric, Léa Drucker, Stéphanie Cléau	Alfama Films	Thriller; Erotic	
M A Y	16	Winter Sleep	Director: Nuri Bilge Ceylan; Cast: Haluk Bilginer, Demet Akbag, Melisa Sözen, Tamer Levent, Nejat Isler	New Wave Films	Drama	
M A Y	17	Love at First Fight	Director: Thomas Cailley; Cast: Adèle Haenel, Kévin Azaïs	Haut et Court	Romance; Comedy	
M A Y	17	Respire	Director: Mélanie Laurent; Cast: Joséphine Japy, Lou de Laâge, Isabelle Carré, Claire Keim	Gaumont	Drama	
M A Y	17	Run	Director: Philippe Lacôte; Cast: Abdoul Karim Konaté	Bac Films	Drama	
M A Y	17	Saint Laurent	Director: Bertrand Bonello; Cast: Gaspard Ulliel, Léa Seydoux, Louis Garrel, Jérémie Renier	EuropaCorp	Biography; Drama	
M A Y	17	Welcome to New York	Director: Abel Ferrara; Cast: Gérard Depardieu, Jacqueline Bisset, Marie Mouté, Shanyn Leigh, Pamela Afesi	IFC Films	Drama	
M A Y	18	Beautiful Youth	Director: Jaime Rosales; Cast: Ingrid García Jonsson		Drama	
M A Y	18	Force Majeure	Director: Ruben Östlund; Cast: Johannes Bah Kuhnke, Lisa Loven Kongsli, Clara Wettergre, Vincent Wettergren, Kristofer Hivju, Fanni Metelius	TriArt Film	Drama	
M A Y	18	Gente de bien	Director: Franco Lolli; Cast: Bryan Santamaria, Carlos Fernando Perez, Alejandra Borrero	Ad Vitam Distribution	Drama	
M A Y	18	Jauja	Director: Lisandro Alonso; Cast: Viggo Mortensen	NDM	Historical; Drama	
M A Y	18	The Homesman	Director: Tommy Lee Jones; Cast: Tommy Lee Jones, Hilary Swank, Meryl Streep	Roadside Attractions	Historical; Drama	
M A Y	19	Bird People	Director: Pascale Ferran; Cast: Josh Charles, Anaïs Demoustier	Diaphana Distribution	Drama	
M A Y	19	Maps to the Stars	Director: David Cronenberg; Cast: Julianne Moore, Mia Wasikowska, John Cusack, Robert Pattinson	Entertainment One	Satire; Drama	
M A Y	19	When Animals Dream	Director: Jonas Alexander Arnby; Cast: Lars Mikkelsen, Jakob Oftebro, Sonja Richter	AlphaVille Pictures Copenhagen	Drama; Horror; Mystery	
M A Y	19	Xenia	Director: Panos H. Koutras; Cast: Kostas Nikouli, Nikos Gelia	Pyramide Distribution	Drama	
M A Y	20	Geronimo	Director: Tony Gatlif; Cast: Céline Sallette, Rachid Yous, David Murgia, Nailia Harzoune	Les Films du Losange	Drama	
M A Y	20	Hope	Director: Boris Lojkine; Cast: Endurance Newton, Justin Wang	Pyramide Distribution	Drama	
M A Y	20	Still the Water	Director: Naomi Kawase; Cast: Nijiro Murakami, Jun Yoshinaga	Asmik Ace	Romance	
M A Y	20	The Salt of the Earth	Directors: Wim Wenders, Juliano Ribeiro Salgado	Le Pacte	Documentary	
M A Y	20	Two Days, One Night	Directors: Luc Dardenne, Jean-Pierre Dardenne; Cast: Marion Cotillard, Fabrizio Rongione	Canal+	Drama	
M A Y	21	Goodbye to Language	Director: Jean-Luc Godard; Cast: Héloïse Godet, Kamel Abdeli, Richard Chevallier, Zoé Bruneau	Wild Bunch	Experimental	
M A Y	21	In the Name of My Daughter	Director: André Téchiné; Cast: Catherine Deneuve, Guillaume Canet, Adèle Haenel	Mars Distribution	Drama	
M A Y	21	The Search	Director: Michel Hazanavicius; Cast: Bérénice Bejo, Annette Bening	Warner Bros.	Drama	
M A Y	22	Alléluia	Director: Fabrice Du Welz; Cast: Lola Dueñas		Drama	
M A Y	22	Bridges of Sarajevo	Directors: Aida Begić, Leonardo Di Constanzo, Jean-Luc Godard, Kamen Kalev, Isild Le Besco, Sergei Loznitsa, Vincenzo Marra, Ursula Meier, Vladimir Perišić, Cristi Puiu, Marc Recha, Angela Schanelec, Teresa Villaverde		Documentary	
M A Y	22	Jimmy's Hall	Director: Ken Loach; Cast: Barry Ward, Simone Kirby, Jim Norton	Entertainment One	Drama	
M A Y	22	Misunderstood	Director: Asia Argento; Cast: Charlotte Gainsbourg		Drama	
M A Y	23	Clouds of Sils Maria	Director: Olivier Assayas; Cast: Juliette Binoche, Kristen Stewart, Chloë Grace Moretz	Les Films du Losange	Drama	
M A Y	23	Pride	Director: Matthew Warchus; Cast: Bill Nighy, Ben Schnetzer, Joseph Gilgun, Freddie Fox	BBC Films	Drama; Comedy	
M A Y	29	The Way Out	Director: Petr Václav; Cast: Klaudia Dudová, David Ištok, Mária Ferencová-Zajacová, Milan Cifra, Natálie Hlaváčová, Sára Makulová, Přemysl Bureš	Aerofilms	Drama	
M A Y	31	Mateo	Director: Maria Gamboa; Cast: Carlos Hernández		Drama	
J U N E	4	Fool Circle	Director: Vincent Mariette; Cast: Ludivine Sagnier, Laurent Lafitte, Vincent Macaigne, Noémie Lvovsky	Haut et Court	Comedy; Drama	
J U N E	11	Paris Follies	Director: Marc Fitoussi; Cast: Isabelle Huppert, Jean-Pierre Darroussin, Michael Nyqvist	SND Films	Comedy	
J U N E	16	Almost Friends	Director: Anne Le Ny; Cast: Karin Viard, Emmanuelle Devos, Roschdy Zem, Anne Le Ny	Mars Distribution	Comedy; Drama	
J U N E	16	Get Well Soon	Director: Jean Becker; Cast: Gérard Lanvin	SND Films	Comedy	
J U N E	16	United Passions	Director: Frédéric Auburtin; Cast: Tim Roth, Gérard Depardieu, Sam Neill, Fisher Stevens	Screen Media Films	Drama	
J U N E	18	Ariane's Thread	Director: Robert Guédiguian; Cast: Ariane Ascaride, Jacques Boudet, Jean-Pierre Darroussin, Anaïs Demoustier, Gérard Meylan	Diaphana Films	Drama	
J U N E	18	Elle L'Adore	Director: Jeanne Herry; Cast: Sandrine Kiberlain, Laurent Lafitte	StudioCanal	Comedy; Drama	
J U N E	25	L'Ex de ma vie	Director: Dorothée Sebbagh; Cast: Géraldine Nakache, Kim Rossi Stuart, Pascal Demolon, Catherine Jacob	UGC	Comedy	
J U N E	26	Volando Bajo	Director: Beto Gómez; Cast: Gerardo Taracena, Ludwika Paleta, Sandra Echeverría, Ana Brenda Contreras, Rodrigo Oviedo, Rafael Inclán, Randy Vasquez		Comedy	

=== July – September ===
Opening		Title	Cast and crew	Studio	Genre(s)	Ref.
J U L Y	5	Bota	Directors: Iris Elezi, Thomas Logoreci; Cast: Flonja Kodheli		Drama	
J U L Y	8	Monument to Michael Jackson	Director: Darko Lungulov; Cast: Boris Milivojevic		Comedy	
J U L Y	9	Corn Island	Director: Giorgi Ovashvili; Cast: İlyas Salman		Drama	
J U L Y	9	Nicholas on Holiday	Director: Laurent Tirard; Cast: Mathéo Boisselier, Valérie Lemercier, Kad Merad, Dominique Lavanant, François-Xavier Demaison, Bouli Lanners	Wild Bunch	Family; Comedy	
J U L Y	18	Ablations	Director: Arnold de Parscau; Cast: Denis Ménochet, Virginie Ledoyen, Florence Thomassin, Philippe Nahon, Yolande Moreau	Ad Vitam Distribution	Drama	
J U L Y	18	The Purge: Anarchy	Director: James DeMonaco; Cast: Frank Grillo, Carmen Ejogo, Zach Gilford, Kiele Sanchez, Michael K. Williams	Universal Pictures	Science Fiction; Action; Horror	
J U L Y	25	Lucy	Director: Luc Besson; Cast: Scarlett Johansson, Morgan Freeman	Universal Pictures	Science Fiction; Action	
A U G U S T	4	The Expendables 3	Director: Patrick Hughes; Cast: Sylvester Stallone, Jason Statham, Antonio Banderas, Jet Li, Wesley Snipes, Dolph Lundgren, Kelsey Grammer, Randy Couture, Terry Crews, Kellan Lutz, Ronda Rousey, Glen Powell, Victor Ortiz, Robert Davi, Mel Gibson, Harrison Ford, Arnold Schwarzenegger	Lionsgate	Action	
A U G U S T	10	Marie's Story	Director: Jean-Pierre Améris; Cast: Isabelle Carré, Ariana Rivoire	Diaphana Films	Biography	
A U G U S T	11	Men Who Save the World	Director: Liew Seng Tat; Cast: Wan Hanafi Su, Harun Salim Bachik, Soffi Jikan, Jalil Hamid, Azhan Rani	Everything Films	Comedy	
A U G U S T	13	The Great Man	Director: Sarah Leonor; Cast: Jérémie Renier; Surho Sugaipov; Ramzan Idiev	Bac Films	Drama	
A U G U S T	20	Discount	Director: Louis-Julien Petit; Cast: Olivier Barthélémy, Corinne Masiero, Pascal Demolon, Sarah Suco, M'Barek Belkouk, Zabou Breitman	Wild Bunch Distribution	Comedy; Drama	
A U G U S T	22	The Missionaries	Director: Tonie Marshall; Cast: Sophie Marceau, Patrick Bruel	Warner Bros.	Romance; Comedy	
A U G U S T	23	Memories	Director: Jean-Paul Rouve; Cast: Michel Blanc, Annie Cordy, Mathieu Spinosi, Chantal Lauby	Nolita Cinema	Comedy; Drama	f
A U G U S T	23	Next Time I'll Aim for the Heart	Director: Cédric Anger; Cast: Guillaume Canet	Mars Distribution	Thriller	
A U G U S T	23	Over Your Dead Body	Director: Takashi Miike; Cast: Ichikawa Ebizō XI, Kō Shibasaki	Shout! Factory	Horror	
A U G U S T	25	L'Affaire SK1	Director: Frédéric Tellier; Cast: Raphaël Personnaz, Nathalie Baye, Olivier Gourmet, Michel Vuillermoz	SND Films	Thriller	
A U G U S T	25	May Allah Bless France!	Director: Abd al Malik; Cast: Marc Zinga, Sabrina Ouazani		Biography	
A U G U S T	26	Métamorphoses	Director: Christophe Honoré; Cast: Amira Akili, Sébastien Hirel, Damien Chapelle, Mélodie Richard, George Babluani	France 3 Cinéma	Drama	
A U G U S T	28	Reality	Director: Quentin Dupieux; Cast: Alain Chabat, Jonathan Lambert, Élodie Bouchez, Kyla Kenedy, John Glover, Eric Wareheim; Jon Heder	Diaphana Films	Comedy; Drama	
A U G U S T	28	The Price of Fame	Director: Xavier Beauvois; Cast: Benoît Poelvoorde, Roschdy Zem, Séli Gmach, Chiara Mastroianni, Nadine Labaki, Peter Coyote	Mars Distribution	Comedy; Drama	
A U G U S T	28	Wolves	Director: David Hayter; Cast: Jason Momoa, Lucas Till, Merritt Patterson, John Pyper-Ferguson, Stephen McHattie, Kaitlyn Leeb, Jennifer Hale	Entertainment One	Action; Horror	
A U G U S T	29	Black Souls	Director: Francesco Munzi; Cast: Barbora Bobuľová		Drama	
A U G U S T	29	El Niño	Director: Daniel Monzón; Cast: Luis Tosar, Jesús Castro, Eduard Fernández, Sergi López, Bárbara Lennie	StudioCanal	Thriller	
A U G U S T	29	The Gate	Director: Régis Wargnier; Cast: Raphaël Personnaz, Olivier Gourmet	Gaumont Distribution	Drama	
A U G U S T	29	Summer Nights (Les nuits d'été)	Director: Mario Fanfani; Cast: Guillaume de Tonquédec, Jeanne Balibar	24 Mai Productions	Drama	
A U G U S T	29	These Are the Rules	Director: Ognjen Sviličić; Cast: Emir Hadžihafizbegović, Jasna Žalica, Hrvoje Vladisavljević	Maxima film	Drama	
A U G U S T	30	The President	Director: Mohsen Makhmalbaf; Cast: Misha Gomiashvili, Dachi Orvelashvili	Makhmalbaf Film House	Drama	
A U G U S T	30	Three Hearts	Director: Benoît Jacquot; Cast: Benoît Poelvoorde, Charlotte Gainsbourg, Chiara Mastroianni, Catherine Deneuve	Wild Bunch	Drama	
A U G U S T	31	Far from Men	Director: David Oelhoffen; Cast: Viggo Mortensen, Reda Kateb	Pathé	Drama	
A U G U S T	31	Return to Ithaca	Director: Laurent Cantet; Cast: Isabel Santos, Jorge Perugorria, Fernando Hechavarría, Néstor Jiménez, Pedro Julio Díaz Ferran	Haut et Court	Comedy; Drama	
A U G U S T	31	The Cut	Director: Fatih Akın; Cast: Tahar Rahim		Drama	
A U G U S T	31	The Smell of Us	Director: Larry Clark		Drama	
S E P T E M B E R	1	Near Death Experience	Directors: Benoît Delépine, Gustave Kervern; Cast: Michel Houellebecq	Ad Vitam Distribution	Drama	
S E P T E M B E R	1	Tsili	Director: Amos Gitai; Cast: Sarah Adler, Meshi Olinski, Lea Koenig, Adam Tsekhman, Andrey Kashkar	Epicentre Films	Drama	
S E P T E M B E R	2	A Pigeon Sat on a Branch Reflecting on Existence	Director: Roy Andersson; Cast: Nisse Vestblom, Holger Andersson	Roy Andersson Filmproduktion AB	Comedy; Drama	
S E P T E M B E R	2	Viktor	Director: Philippe Martinez; Cast: Gérard Depardieu, Elizabeth Hurley, Eli Danker, Polina Kuzminskaya, Alexei Petrenko, Marcello Mazzarella, Denis Karasyov	Inception Media Group	Action	
S E P T E M B E R	3	The Last Hammer Blow	Director: Alix Delaporte; Cast: Romain Paul, Clotilde Hesme, Grégory Gadebois	Pyramide Distribution	Drama	
S E P T E M B E R	4	Before I Go to Sleep	Director: Rowan Joffé; Cast: Nicole Kidman, Mark Strong, Colin Firth, Anne-Marie Duff	Clarius Entertainment	Mystery; Thriller	
S E P T E M B E R	4	Pasolini	Director: Abel Ferrara; Cast: Willem Dafoe, Maria de Medeiros, Ninetto Davoli, Riccardo Scamarcio	Canal+	Drama	
S E P T E M B E R	4	The Valley	Director: Ghassan Salhab; Cast: Carol Abboud		Drama	
S E P T E M B E R	5	Eden	Director: Mia Hansen-Løve; Cast: Greta Gerwig, Brady Corbet, Golshifteh Farahani, Laura Smet	Ad Vitam Distribution	Drama	
S E P T E M B E R	5	Murder in Pacot	Director: Raoul Peck; Cast: Joy Olasunmibo Ogunmakin, Alex Descas, Thibault Vinçon, Lovely Kermonde Fifi, Zinedine Soualem	Doc&Film International	Drama	
S E P T E M B E R	6	Don't Breathe	Director: Nino Kirtadze; Cast: Levan Murtazashvili		Drama	
S E P T E M B E R	6	Gemma Bovery	Director: Anne Fontaine; Cast: Gemma Arterton, Jason Flemyng, Mel Raido, Fabrice Luchini	Gaumont	Drama; Comedy	
S E P T E M B E R	6	Song of the Sea	Director: Tomm Moore; Cast: David Rawle, Brendan Gleeson, Fionnula Flanagan, Lisa Hannigan, Lucy O'Connell, Jon Kenny, Pat Shortt, Colm Ó Snodaigh, Liam Hourican, Kevin Swierszcz	StudioCanal	Animation; Fantasy	
S E P T E M B E R	6	The New Girlfriend	Director: François Ozon; Cast: Romain Duris, Anaïs Demoustier, Raphaël Personnaz	Mars Distribution	Drama	
S E P T E M B E R	6	Voice Over	Director: Cristián Jiménez; Cast: Ingrid Isensee		Drama	
S E P T E M B E R	7	Miss Julie	Director: Liv Ullmann; Cast: Jessica Chastain, Colin Farrell, Samantha Morton	Columbia TriStar	Drama	
S E P T E M B E R	7	Red Rose	Director: Sepideh Farsi; Cast: Mina Kavani, Vassilis Koukalani, Shabnam Tolouei	UDI	Drama	
S E P T E M B E R	7	Samba	Directors: Olivier Nakache, Eric Toledano; Cast: Omar Sy, Charlotte Gainsbourg, Tahar Rahim, Izïa Higelin	Gaumont	Comedy; Drama	
S E P T E M B E R	7	Tokyo Fiancée	Director: Stefan Liberski; Cast: Pauline Etienne, Taichi Inoue, Julie Le Breton		Drama	
S E P T E M B E R	8	Still Alice	Directors: Richard Glatzer, Wash West; Cast: Julianne Moore, Alec Baldwin, Kristen Stewart, Kate Bosworth, Hunter Parrish	Sony Pictures Classics	Drama	
S E P T E M B E R	10	My Old Lady	Director: Israel Horovitz; Cast: Maggie Smith, Kevin Kline, Kristin Scott Thomas, Dominique Pinon	Curzon Film World	Comedy; Drama	
S E P T E M B E R	10	The Connection	Director: Cédric Jimenez; Cast: Jean Dujardin, Gilles Lellouche	Gaumont	Action Crime Thriller	
S E P T E M B E R	10	The Kindergarten Teacher	Director: Nadav Lapid		Drama	
S E P T E M B E R	11	Escobar: Paradise Lost	Director: Andrea Di Stefano; Cast: Benicio Del Toro, Josh Hutcherson, Claudia Traisac, Brady Corbet, Carlos Bardem, Ana Girardot	The Weinstein Company	Romance; Thriller	
S E P T E M B E R	21	Hogtown	Director: Daniel Nearing; Cast: Herman Wilkins, Diandra Lyle, Alexander Sharon, McKenzie Chinn, Marco Garcia, Dianne Bischoff	9:23 Films	Drama; Romance; Mystery	
S E P T E M B E R	22	Outcast	Director: Nick Powell; Cast: Hayden Christensen, Nicolas Cage, Liu Yifei, Ji Ke Jun Yi, Andy On	Entertainment One	Action	
S E P T E M B E R	24	Brèves de comptoir	Director: Jean-Michel Ribes	Diaphana Films	Comedy	
S E P T E M B E R	27	Eyes of a Thief	Director: Najwa Najjar; Cast: Khaled Abol Naga		Drama	

=== October – December ===
Opening		Title	Cast and crew	Studio	Genre(s)	Ref.
O C T O B E R	2	Atlit	Director: Shirel Amitaï; Cast: Géraldine Nakache, Judith Chemla, Yaël Abecassis	Ad Vitam Distribution	Drama	
O C T O B E R	6	Young Tiger	Director: Cyprien Vial; Cast: Harmandeep Palminder	Haut et Court	Drama	
O C T O B E R	7	Once in a Lifetime	Director: Marie-Castille Mention-Schaar; Cast: Ariane Ascaride, Ahmed Dramé	UGC Distribution	Drama	
O C T O B E R	10	Moomins on the Riviera	Director: Xavier Picard; Cast: Russell Tovey, Nathaniel Parker, Tracy-Ann Oberman, Stephanie Winiecki, Ruth Gibson, Philippe Smolikowski, Dave Browne, Shelley Blond	Vertigo Films	Animation; Family; Comedy	
O C T O B E R	10	The Easy Way Out	Director: Brice Cauvin; Cast: Laurent Lafitte, Agnès Jaoui, Benjamin Biolay, Nicolas Bedos	KMBO	Comedy; Drama	
O C T O B E R	11	Yellowbird	Director: Christian De Vita; Cast: Seth Green, Dakota Fanning, Christine Baranski, Yvette Nicole Brown, Richard Kind, Jim Rash, Danny Glover, Elliott Gould	TeamTO	Animation	
O C T O B E R	13	Serena	Director: Susanne Bier; Cast: Jennifer Lawrence, Bradley Cooper, Rhys Ifans, Sean Harris, Toby Jones	StudioCanal	Drama	
O C T O B E R	17	Magical Girl	Director: Carlos Vermut; Cast: Luis Bermejo, Bárbara Lennie, José Sacristán	Avalon	Drama; Thriller	
O C T O B E R	20	The Smoke	Director: Ben Pickering; Cast: Matt Di Angelo, Lili Bordán, Alan Ford, Stephen Marcus, Lindsay Armaou	Signature Entertainment	Crime Thriller	
O C T O B E R	22	Lili Rose	Director: Bruno Ballouard; Cast: Salomé Stévenin, Mehdi Dehbi, Bruno Clairefond, Thomas Chabrol, Catherine Jacob	Zelig Films Distribution	Romance	
O C T O B E R	22	Magic in the Moonlight	Director: Woody Allen; Cast: Colin Firth, Emma Stone, Hamish Linklater, Marcia Gay Harden, Jacki Weaver, Erica Leerhsen, Eileen Atkins, Simon McBurney	Sony Pictures Classics	Comedy; Romance	
O C T O B E R	29	Wild Life	Director: Cédric Kahn; Cast: Mathieu Kassovitz, Céline Sallette	France 2 Cinéma	Drama	
N O V E M B E R	7	La Famille Bélier	Director: Éric Lartigau; Cast: Karin Viard, François Damiens, Éric Elmosnino, Louane Emera	Mars Distribution	Comedy; Drama	
N O V E M B E R	11	The Clearstream Affair	Director: Vincent Garenq; Cast: Gilles Lellouche, Charles Berling, Laurent Capelluto, Florence Loiret-Caille	Mars Distribution	Thriller	
N O V E M B E R	26	Asterix: The Land of the Gods	Directors: Alexandre Astier, Louis Clichy; Cast: Roger Carel, Guillaume Briat, Lionnel Astier, Serge Papagalli, Florence Foresti	SND Films	Adventure Family; Comedy; Animation	
N O V E M B E R	27	A Borrowed Identity	Director: Eran Riklis; Cast: Tawfeek Barhom		Drama	
N O V E M B E R	28	Paddington	Director: Paul King; Cast: Hugh Bonneville, Nicole Kidman, Colin Firth, Julie Walters, Jim Broadbent, Peter Capaldi	StudioCanal UK	Comedy	
N O V E M B E R	28	Traces of Sandalwood	Director: Maria Ripoll; Cast: Nandita Das, Aina Clotet, Subodh Maskara, Naby Dakhli		Drama	
D E C E M B E R	10	Le Père Noël	Director: Alexandre Coffre; Cast: Tahar Rahim, Victor Cabal	Mars Distribution	Comedy	
D E C E M B E R	14	The Sea Is Behind	Director: Hisham Lasri; Cast: Malek Akhmiss		Drama	
D E C E M B E R	16	Taken 3	Director: Olivier Megaton; Cast: Liam Neeson, Forest Whitaker, Famke Janssen, Maggie Grace, Dougray Scott, Sam Spruell, Leland Orser	20th Century Fox	Action	
D E C E M B E R	24	Fidelio: Alice's Journey	Director: Lucie Borleteau; Cast: Ariane Labed, Melvil Poupaud, Anders Danielsen Lie	Pyramide Distribution	Drama	
D E C E M B E R	25	Shrew's Nest	Directors: Juan Fernando Andrés, Esteban Roel; Cast: Macarena Gómez, Nadia de Santiago, Hugo Silva, Luis Tosar	Nadie es Perfecto	Thriller; Horror	
D E C E M B E R	31	Do Not Disturb	Director: Patrice Leconte; Cast: Christian Clavier, Carole Bouquet, Valérie Bonneton, Rossy de Palma, Stéphane De Groodt, Sébastien Castro	Wild Bunch Distribution	Comedy	
D E C E M B E R	31	Mon Amie Victoria	Director: Jean-Paul Civeyrac; Cast: Guslagie Malanda, Nadia Moussa, Catherine Mouchet, Pascal Greggory		Drama	

== Notable deaths ==
Month	Date	Name	Age	Nationality	Profession	Notable films
March	1	Alain Resnais	91	French	Director, screenwriter	Providence; Pictura: An Adventure in Art
June	7	Jacques Herlin	86	French	Actor	National Lampoon's European Vacation; The Messenger: The Story of Joan of Arc
June	11	Gilles Ségal	82	Romanian-French	Actor	Topkapi; The Madwoman of Chaillot
June	14	Isabelle Collin Dufresne	78	French-American	Actress	Midnight Cowboy; An Unmarried Woman
June	15	Jacques Bergerac	87	French	Actor	Gigi; Les Girls
September	20	George Sluizer	82	French-Dutch	Director, producer, screenwriter	The Vanishing; Dark Blood
October	15	Marie Dubois	77	French	Actress	Monte Carlo or Bust!; Hot Line
October	26	Françoise Bertin	89	French	Actress	The Truth About Charlie; I Want to Go Home

== See also ==
- 2014 in film
- 2014 in France
- 2014 in French television
- Cinema of France
- List of 2014 box office number-one films in France
- List of French submissions for the Academy Award for Best Foreign Language Film
