= List of Iranian films of 2014 =

The Iranian film industry produced over sixty feature films in 2014. This article fully lists all non-pornographic films, including short films, that had a release date in that year and which were at least partly made by Iran. It does not include films first released in previous years that had release dates in 2014.
Also included is an overview of the major events in Iranian film, including film festivals and awards ceremonies, as well as lists of those films that have been particularly well received, both critically and financially.

== Major releases ==
Opening		Title	Cast and Crew	Studio	Genre(s)	Ref.
F E B R U A R Y	1	He Who Said No	Director: Ahmad Reza Darvish; Cast: Arash Aasefi, Shaghayegh Farahani, Anoushirvan Arjmand, Pouria Poursorkh, Hasan Pourshirazi, Farhad Ghaemian, Babak Hamidian, Bahador Zamani, Mahtab Keramati, David Sterne	Farabi Cinema Foundation	Islamic; Epic	
F E B R U A R Y	8	I'm Not Angry!	Director: Reza Dormishian; Cast: Baran Kosari, Navid Mohammadzadeh, Milad Rahimi	Iranian Independents	Drama	
F E B R U A R Y	24	Che	Director: Ebrahim Hatamikia; Cast: Fariborz Arabnia, Saeed Rad, Babak Hamidian, Merila Zarei		Biography; War	
M A Y	13	What's the Time in Your World?	Director: Safi Yazdanian; Cast: Leila Hatami, Ali Mosaffa, Zari Khoshkam, Ebrahim Zamir, Payam Yazdani, Christophe Rezai, Lili Samii, Zeynab Sha'bani	Road Film	Drama	
A U G U S T	28	Tales	Director: Rakhshan Bani-E'temad; Cast: Habib Rezaei		Drama	
S E P T E M B E R	7	Red Rose	Director: Sepideh Farsi; Cast: Mina Kavani, Vassilis Koukalani, Shabnam Tolouei	UDI	Drama	

== See also ==
- 2014 in film
- 2014 in Iran
- Cinema of Iran
- List of Iranian submissions for the Academy Award for Best Foreign Language Film
