= List of 2014 box office number-one films in France =

== Box office number-one films ==
This is a list of films which placed number one at the weekly box office in France during 2014. The weeks start on Wednesdays, and finish on Tuesdays. The box-office number one is established in terms of tickets sold during the week.

†	This implies the highest-grossing movie of the year.

Week	End date for the week	Film	Tickets sold	Note(s)
1	January 7, 2014	The Wolf of Wall Street	701,800	
2	January 14, 2014	Yves Saint Laurent	554,846	
3	January 21, 2014	Yves Saint Laurent	410,488	
4	January 28, 2014	12 Years a Slave	375,305	
5	February 4, 2014	Minuscule: Valley of the Lost Ants	392,852	
6	February 11, 2014	RoboCop	348,763	
7	February 18, 2014	Les Trois Frères, le retour	1,112,863	
8	February 25, 2014	Les Trois Frères, le retour	611,250	
9	March 4, 2014	Supercondriaque	2,151,921	
10	March 11, 2014	Supercondriaque	1,189,985	
11	March 18, 2014	Fiston	921,751	
12	March 25, 2014	Supercondriaque	476,865	
13	April 1, 2014	Captain America: The Winter Soldier	769,959	
14	April 8, 2014	Captain America: The Winter Soldier	452,237	
15	April 15, 2014	Rio 2	668,971	
16	April 22, 2014	Serial (Bad) Weddings	1,680,249	
17	April 29, 2014	Serial (Bad) Weddings	1,734,346	
18	May 6, 2014	Serial (Bad) Weddings	1,715,283	
19	May 13, 2014	Serial (Bad) Weddings	1,585,662	
20	May 20, 2014	Godzilla	720,996	
21	May 27, 2014	X-Men: Days of Future Past	1 223,166	
22	June 3, 2014	X-Men: Days of Future Past	964,630	
23	June 10, 2014	Edge of Tomorrow	425,198	
24	June 17, 2014	Sous les jupes des filles	240,561	
25	June 24, 2014	The Other Woman	214,548	
26	July 1, 2014	Serial (Bad) Weddings †	457,461	
27	July 8, 2014	How to Train Your Dragon 2	1,340,940	
28	July 15, 2014	Nicholas on Holiday	887,210	
29	July 22, 2014	Transformers: Age of Extinction	1,215,124	
30	July 29, 2014	Transformers: Age of Extinction	529,588	
31	August 5, 2014	Dawn of the Planet of the Apes	1,746,921	
32	August 12, 2014	Lucy	1,941,424	
33	August 19, 2014	Lucy	1,080,839	
34	August 26, 2014	Lucy	734,480	
35	September 2, 2014	Lucy	479,526	
36	September 9, 2014	Lucy	264,029	
37	September 16, 2014	Gemma Bovery	231,154	
38	September 23, 2014	Get Well Soon	212,122	
39	September 30, 2014	Elle l'adore	204,698	
40	October 7, 2014	The Missionaries	431,620	
41	October 14, 2014	Gone Girl	539,178	
42	October 21, 2014	Samba	900,042	
43	October 28, 2014	The Maze Runner	871,402	
44	November 4, 2014	The Maze Runner	530,511	
45	November 11, 2014	Interstellar	1,071,360	
46	November 18, 2014	Interstellar	572,034	
47	November 25, 2014	The Hunger Games: Mockingjay – Part 1	1,538,201	
48	December 2, 2014	Asterix: The Land of the Gods	842,999	
49	December 9, 2014	Paddington	570,040	
50	December 16, 2014	The Hobbit: The Battle of the Five Armies	1,789,196	
51	December 23, 2014	The Hobbit: The Battle of the Five Armies	1,229,228	
52	December 30, 2014	La Famille Bélier	1,241,370	

== Highest-grossing French productions ==
This is a list of domestic films, released in 2014, that registered over one million admissions in France.

Rank	Original title	English title	Tickets sold	Distributor
1	Qu'est-ce qu'on a fait au Bon Dieu?	Serial (Bad) Weddings	12,343,707	UGC Distribution
2	La Famille Bélier	The Bélier Family	7,449,207	Mars Distribution
3	Supercondriaque	Supercondriaque	5,268,881	Pathé
4	Lucy	Lucy	5,201,019	EuropaCorp. Distribution
5	Samba	Samba	3,110,070	Gaumont
6	Astérix: Le Domaine des Dieux	Asterix: The Land of the Gods	2,993,606	SND Films
7	Les Vacances du Petit Nicolas	Nicholas on Holiday	2,455,294	Wild Bunch
8	Babysitting	Babysitting	2,358,733	Universal Pictures International
9	Les Trois Frères, le retour	Three Brothers: The Return	2,289,408	Wild Bunch
10	Fiston	Fiston	1,922,868	SND Films
11	La Belle et la Bête	Beauty and the Beast	1,826,747	Pathé
12	Yves Saint Laurent	Yves Saint Laurent	1,639,214	SND Films
13	Barbecue	Barbecue	1,600,584	StudioCanal
14	La French	The Connection	1,530,106	Gaumont
15	Minuscule – La Vallée des fourmis perdues	Minuscule: Valley of the Lost Ants	1,465,299	Le Pacte
16	Sous les jupes des filles	French Women	1,389,147	Wild Bunch
17	Le Crocodile du Botswanga	The Crocodile of Botswanga	1,227,314	Mars Distribution
18	Timbuktu	Timbuktu	1,180,890	Le Pacte
19	Tu veux ou tu veux pas	The Missionaries	1,059,794	Warner Bros.
20	Une heure de tranquillité	Do Not Disturb	1,006,867	Wild Bunch Distribution

== See also ==
- List of French films of 2014
- Lists of highest-grossing films in France
