= Ali Qorbanzadeh =

Iranian actor

- علی قربان‌زاده
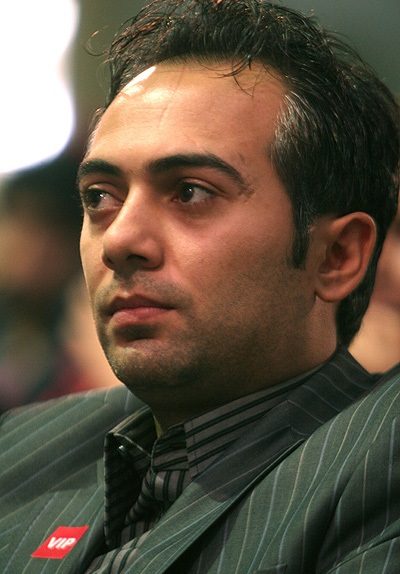
- Born: 22 October 1978 (age 47); Abadan, Iran
- Occupation: Actor
- Years active: 1998–present
- Works: Cinema

Ali Qorbanzadeh is an Iranian actor. He became interested in acting at the age of 15. He started working in entertainment in animation, and directed his first animated film at the age of 16. At the age of 19 he started acting in live action, and directed yet another animation short film called Dokhtaram (My Daughter) at the age of 21, starring Iranian veteran actor Reza Kianian. Though Qorbanzadeh has not academically studied acting, but his vast resume and his wide spectrum of roles he has played makes him a recognizable name and face amongst Iranian audiences. Qorbanzadeh is a much sought-after actor among Iranian directors, though in recent years he has worked mainly with leading director Saman Moghadam (Maxx, Ghalbe Yakhi). Together, Moghadam and Qorbanzadeh have produced three features and two series.

== Filmography ==
=== Films ===
Name	Year	Director	Genre
Siavash	1998	Saman Moghadam	Drama
Party	1999	Saman Moghadam	Drama
Shab-e Berehne	2001	Saeed Soheili	Drama
Ghazal	2001	Mohamad Reza Zehtabi	Drama
The Fifth Reaction	2003	Tahmineh Milani	Drama
Ye Asheghane-ye Sadeh	2012	Saman Moghadam	Drama
Sperm Whale	2015	Saman Moghadam	Comedy

=== Television ===
Name	Year	Character	Director	Genre
Dastan-e Yek Shahr	2000	Rafii	Various	Drama
Without Description	2002		Mehdi Mazloumi	Comedy
Zero Degree Turn	2007	Ardeshir	Various	Drama
Ghalbe Yakhi Season 3	2012		Saman Moghadam	Thriller

== Photography ==
Ali Qorbanzadeh is also a professional photographer. His work has been exhibited in various photography shows, including IPA International Photo Award in New York City in 2010.
