= No Bears =

- UK release poster
- Persian: خرس نیست
- Literally: There are no bears
- Directed by: Jafar Panahi
- Written by: Jafar Panahi
- Produced by: Jafar Panahi
- Starring: Jafar Panahi; Naser Hashemi; Vahid Mobsari; Bakhtiar Panjei; Mina Kavani; Reza Heydari
- Cinematography: Amin Jafari
- Edited by: Amir Etminan
- Distributed by: Celluloid Dreams
- Release date: 9 September 2022 (Venice)
- Running time: 107 minutes^{:4}
- Country: Iran
- Languages: Persian; Azerbaijani; Turkish
- Box office: $1.1 million

No Bears (Persian: خرس نیست, romanized: Khers Nist, lit. 'There are no bears') is a 2022 Iranian drama film written, directed and produced by Jafar Panahi. The film was shot secretly in Iran and stars Panahi, Naser Hashemi, Vahid Mobasri, Bakhtiar Panjei and Mina Kavani. Production wrapped up in May 2022.

No Bears premiered at the 79th Venice Film Festival in competition for the Golden Lion, without the presence of the director, who has been arrested and sentenced to 6 years prison in Iran, prior to the film's release. The film is distributed by Celluloid Dreams. It won the Special Jury Prize at the Venice Film Festival in September 2022, and received overwhelmingly positive reviews from critics.

== Plot ==
Prohibited by the government from making films and from leaving Iran, owing to his politically critical movies, filmmaker Jafar Panahi, playing a fictionalized version of himself, has rented a room at the village of Jaban, near the Iran–Turkey border, where he is remotely directing a docudrama about an Iranian couple, Bakhtiar and Zara, who are attempting to secure fake passports so they can flee the country after years of government abuse. Bakhtiar has successfully acquired a passport for Zara but couldn't get one for himself. While watching the footage through a livestream on his computer, Panahi loses connection and is cut out.

At night, Reza, Panahi's assistant director, appears at Jafar's place and takes him on a drive. Reza says that the cast and crew, himself included, are growing weary of Panahi's absence and informs Panahi that he has arranged with people smugglers to take him to Turkey for a few days. Reza takes Panahi to the border line between Iran and Turkey. Panahi gets scared, and drives back to Jaban. As he arrives at the village, he's approached by a young woman, Gozal, who desperately asks Panahi if he took a photo of her with her boyfriend, Solduz, saying that should anyone see it "all hell will break loose" and "there will be blood".

The next day, Panahi is visited by three villagers. He's asked about the pictures he took, and is told about a tradition in the village: when a girl is born, her umbilical cord is cut in the name of her future husband. He says Gozal's was cut for Jacob, who's expecting to marry her soon, but that Solduz is barring that from happening. The villager says Solduz's father is offended and feeling dishonored by the accusation, and asks for the photo so Solduz's father will intervene and keep his son away from Gozal. Panahi denies ever taking a picture of Gozal and Solduz together. That night, he's visited by Solduz, who explains to him that he and Gozal are in love and that in a week's time they will elope and leave the village.

Back in Turkey, Bakhtiar tells Panahi that he'll be able to acquire a fake passport for himself too. The next day, the villagers grow more stressed over the photo situation. One of the little boys that Panahi photographed gives an account of the moment, saying that Panahi indeed photographed Gozal and Solduz together. Panahi denies it once again, showing the digital images on his camera to everyone and giving the camera's memory card to Jaban's sheriff. Unconvinced, the villagers ask Panahi to go to their swearing room and swear to God that he did not take the picture or see Gozal and Solduz together.

On his way to the swearing, he's approached by a villager who warns him that there are bears on the path and that he shouldn't go by himself. The villager tells Panahi that he doesn't have to swear the truth, and that a lie is permissible if it brings peace to everyone. The villager explains that while town people like Panahi have a problem with authorities, villagers have a problem with superstition. They leave the house and as they separate at a fork in the road, the villager says that there are no bears; the stories are made up to scare people.

At the swearing room, Panahi is asked to swear over the Quran, but he proposes instead to film his oath and give a copy to everyone. Jacob objects angrily when Panahi tells the camera that he can't understand the traditions of the village, like cutting a baby girl's umbilical cord in the name of a future husband. A heated discussion ensues, and the impasse continues.

In Turkey, Bakhtiar and Zara say their goodbyes as they prepare to leave for Paris after Bakhtiar secured his passport from a smuggler. Zara interrupts the shooting and starts to address Panahi, who's watching the livestream, directly to the camera. She says the movie is supposed to be all reality, but that Bakhtiar is lying: his passport is a prop and invalid. She'd have to leave alone, which she refuses to do. Zara becomes enraged, recalling all the abuse and torture she has endured for ten years. She leaves the shooting. Later, Panahi is informed that Zara is missing. Bakhtiar goes on a bender. Inebriated, he says his lie has destroyed Zara more than all the government abuses; that she has attempted suicide twice, and he fears for her safety. The next day on the shore, they find the body of a woman who has drowned herself. Bakhtiar is stunned to recognize the body as Zara's. Panahi calls "cut".

Panahi's landlord, Ghanbar, tells him the whole photo turmoil has become unbearable and the police and Revolutionary Guards are now involved. He asks Panahi to leave the village. On his way out, Panahi passes through a commotion of people around a dead body. Ghanbar informs Panahi that Gozal and Solduz were both shot and killed while trying to cross the border. Panahi starts to drive away, then stops the car.

== Cast ==
- Jafar Panahi as himself
- Naser Hashemi as Village Chief
- Vahid Mobasheri as Ghanbar
- Bakhtiar Panjeei as Bakhtiar
- Mina Kavani as Zara
- Narjes Delaram as Ghanbar’s Mother
- Reza Heydari as Reza
- Javad Siyahi as Jacob
- Yousef Soleymani as Jacob’s Uncle
- Amir Davari as Solduz
- Darya Alei as Gozal
- Rahim Abbasi as Villager
- Sinan Yusufoglu as Sinan
- Ehsan Ahmad Khanpour as Kid
- Iman Bazyar as Soldier

== Production ==
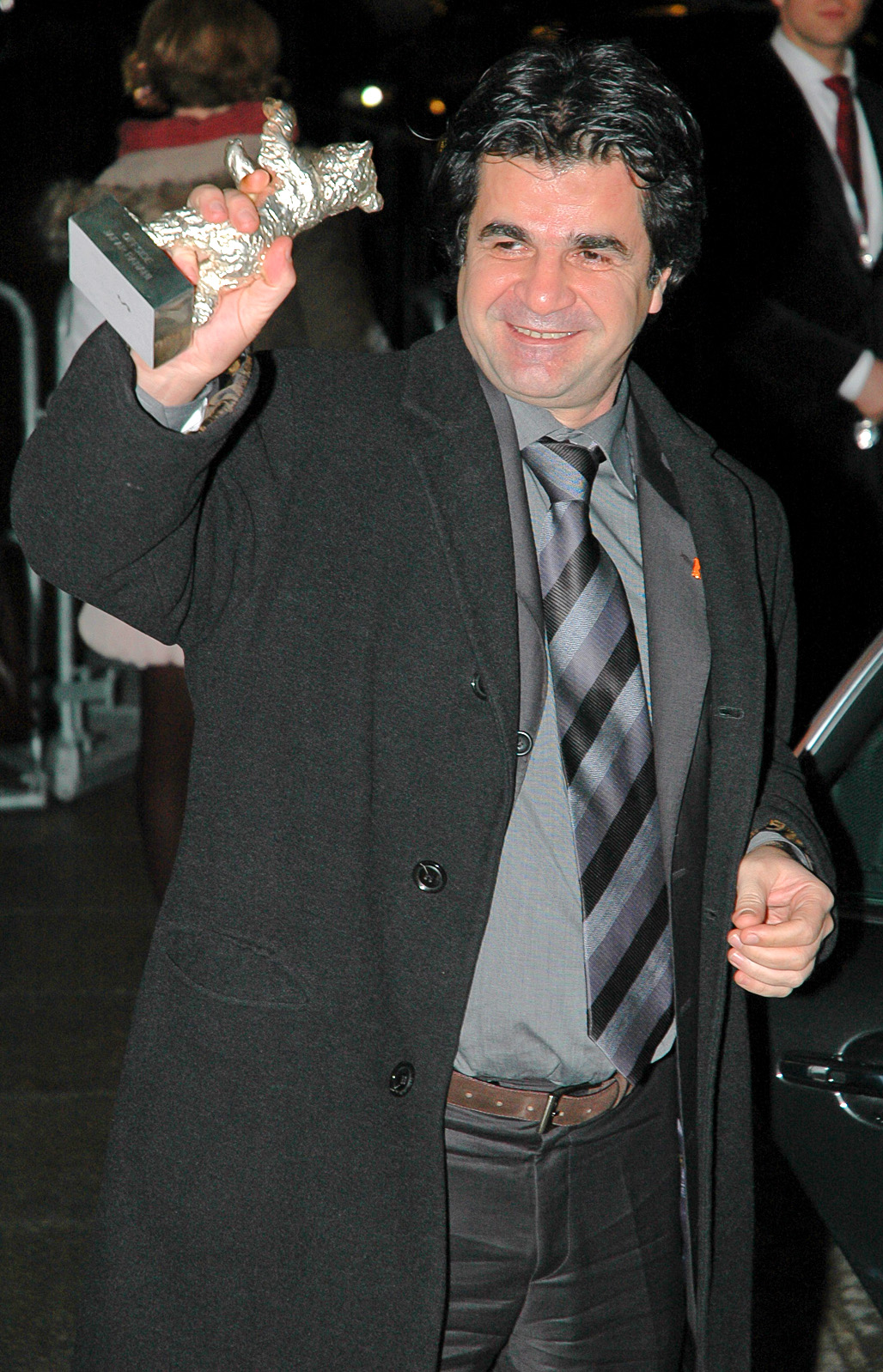
Jafar Panahi, writer, director and producer of No Bears, was arrested and sentenced to 6 years in prison prior to the film's release in July 2022.

No Bears is the ninth feature film directed by Jafar Panahi and the first one since 3 Faces (2018). The filmmaker had made two short films in between. In addition to writing, directing and producing No Bears, Panahi also stars in the film with Naser Hashemi, Vahid Mobasri, Bakhtiar Panjei, Mina Khosravani, and others. Panahi is said to have received more freedom to produce the film after the end of the curfew imposed in 2022, due to the spread of COVID-19 in Iran.

Production wrapped in May 2022, and the rights were traded shortly after at the 2022 Cannes Film Festival by Paris-based Celluloid Dreams, which had undertaken the same task for the director's previous works. The film is dedicated to Celluloid Dreams founder Hengameh Panahi.

== Director's arrest ==
On July 11, 2022, Panahi was arrested and sentenced to six years in Evin prison on the charges of "propaganda against the regime". According to Panahi, after the arrest of his two colleagues, Mohammad Rasoulof and Mustafa Al-Ahmad, he had expressed solidarity, along with several hundred other filmmakers, over the Internet; they are said to have demonstrated online against the police brutality in Iran.

After No Bears was selected for the Golden Lion competition of the Venice Film Festival, the Ministry of Culture of the Islamic Republic of Iran called the film a "political game [rather than a] movie [that] does not have a production license". On July 28, 2022, the Iranian Film Directors Association issued an official statement congratulating the selected directors for the nomination, and moreover demanding that the Iranian government consider "the request of 19 cinema guilds, and hundreds of cinematographers [to] examine the status of these filmmakers, and their release as soon as possible".

It was reported that the 79th Venice Film Festival was significantly affected by the arrest and trial of Panahi. The artistic director of the festival Alberto Barbera, after announcing the list of films in a media event, demanded the release of directors Panahi, Rasoulov and Al-Ahmad. He later called on "all filmmakers and other personalities" to join a flash mob that will take place on the red carpet before the premiere on September 9 at 16:30 at the Palazzo del Cinema, to protest Panahi's arrest and to show solidarity with others from around the world who have faced persecution in the same way.

== Release ==
No Bears had its world premiere in-competition at the 79th Venice International Film Festival for the Golden Lion, on 9 September 2022. The film had its North American premiere that same month at the 2022 Toronto International Film Festival.

== Reception ==
On the review aggregator website Rotten Tomatoes, 99% of 109 critics' reviews are positive, with an average rating of 8.5/10. The website's consensus reads: "No Bears bears witness to Jafar Panahi's incisive filmmaking while urging viewers to examine the complex layers of a deceptively simple story: a man oppressed and suppressed by his country." Metacritic, which uses a weighted average, assigned the film a score of 93 out of 100, based on 29 critics, indicating "universal acclaim".

Filmmaker Laura Poitras praised the film, saying "To watch No Bears is to experience a kind of cinematic vertigo: a renowned director goes to a rural village to remotely direct a fiction film about lovers escaping a country, who perhaps takes a photograph of young lovers in the village defying authority, and who perhaps himself is trying to escape."

=== Accolades ===
Panahi competed for the Golden Lion, the main prize of the Venice Film Festival for the second time; he first received this award for his movie The Circle (2000). No Bears won the Special Jury Prize with actors Mina Kavani and Reza Heydari accepting the award in Panahi's absence.

Award	Date of ceremony	Category	Recipient(s)	Result	Ref(s)
Venice Film Festival	31 August – 10 September 2022	Golden Lion	Jafar Panahi ‡	Nominated	
Venice Film Festival	31 August – 10 September 2022	Special Jury Prize	No Bears	Won	
Chicago International Film Festival	13–23 October 2022	Award for Cinematic Bravery	No Bears	Won	
Chicago International Film Festival	13–23 October 2022	Gold Hugo	No Bears	Nominated	
Valladolid International Film Festival	22–29 October 2022	Golden Spike	No Bears	Nominated	
National Society of Film Critics	7 January 2023	Best Director	Jafar Panahai	3rd place	
National Society of Film Critics	7 January 2023	Best Foreign Language Film	No Bears	Runner-up	
National Society of Film Critics	7 January 2023	Best Picture	No Bears	3rd place	
‡ The director is in prison, so he cannot participate in competitions and receive awards.

== See also ==
- The Year of the Everlasting Storm
