= 2022 National Society of Film Critics Awards =

Annual US film awards ceremony

57th NSFC Awards
- Date: January 7, 2023

Highlights
- Best Picture: Tár

The 57th National Society of Film Critics Awards, given on 7 January 2023, honored the best in film for 2022.

American film Tár won the most awards with three, including Best Film and Best Actress (Cate Blanchett).

== Winners ==
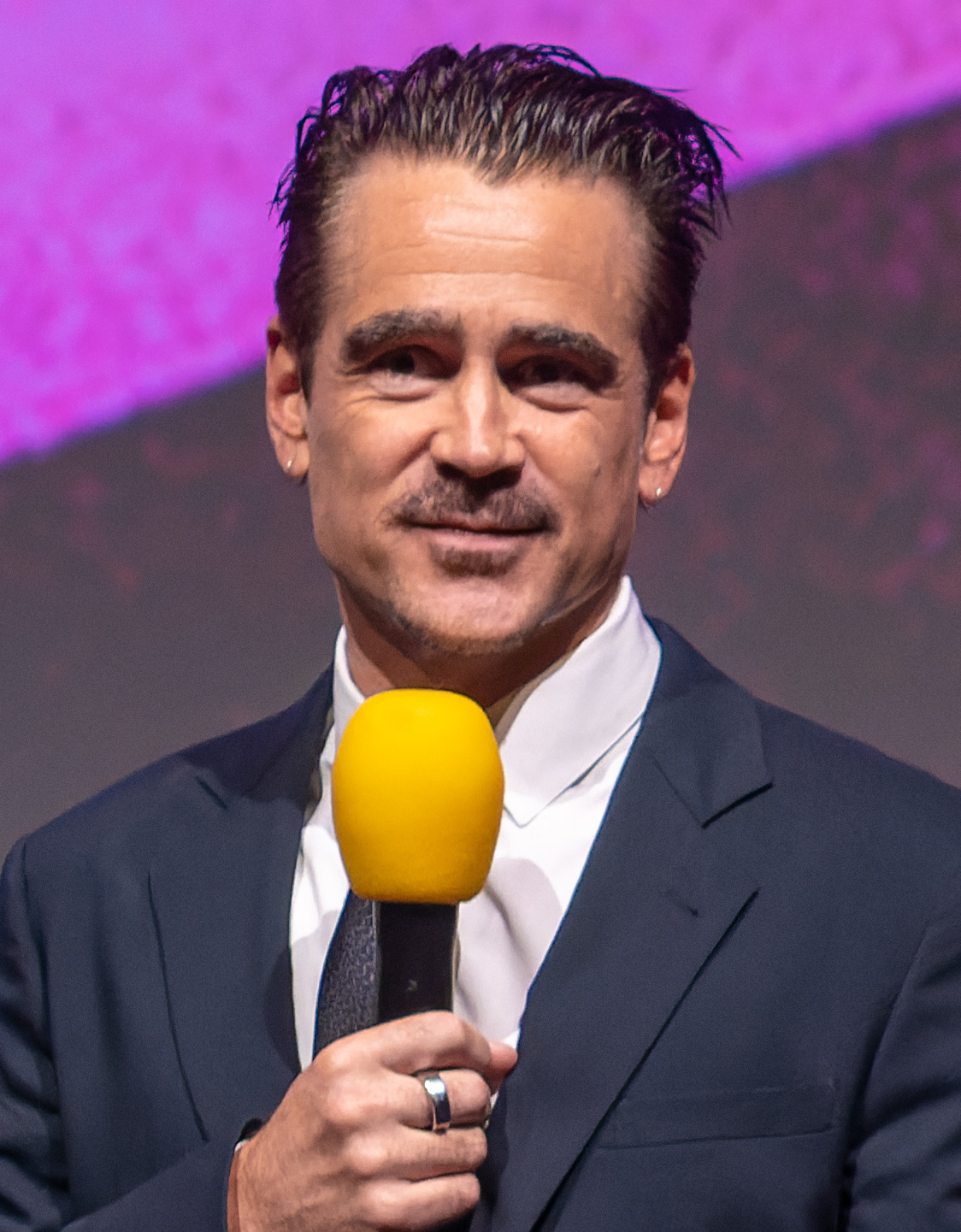
Colin Farrell, Best Actor winner

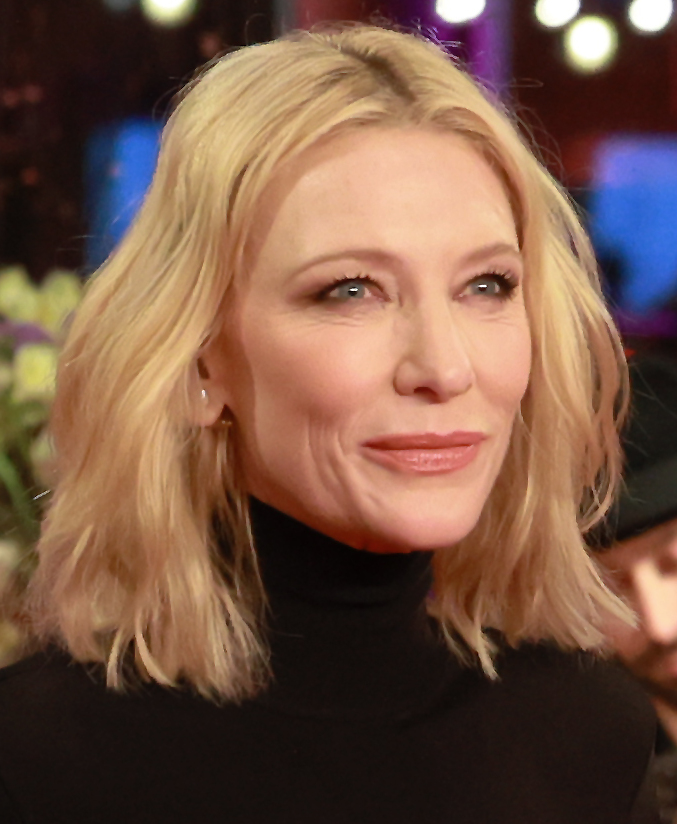
Cate Blanchett, Best Actress winner

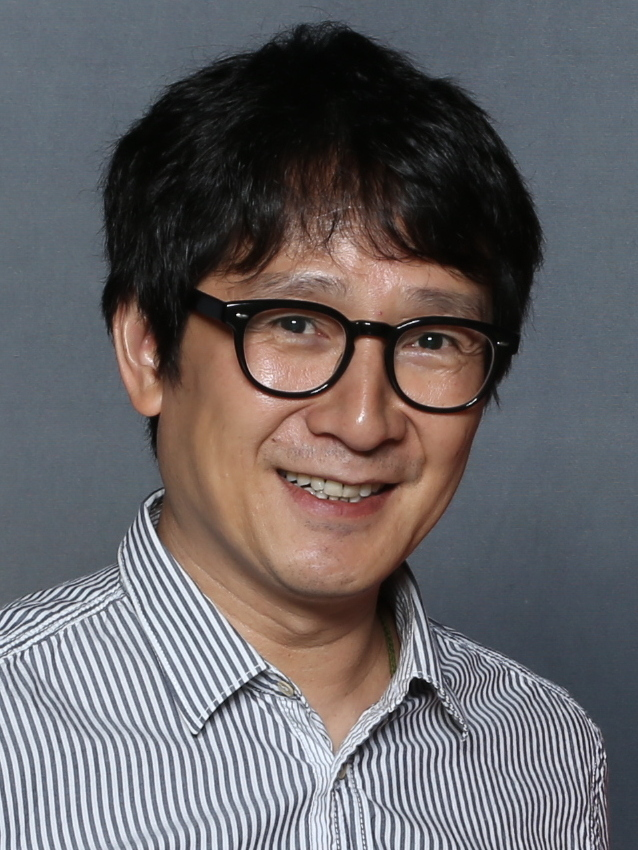
Ke Huy Quan, Best Supporting Actor winner

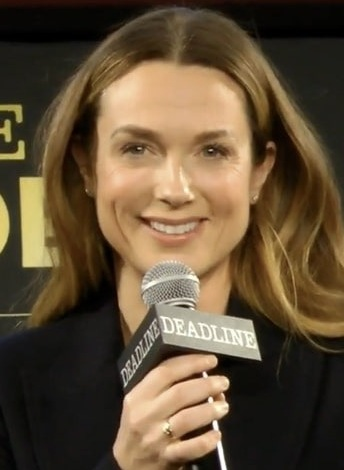
Kerry Condon, Best Supporting Actress winner

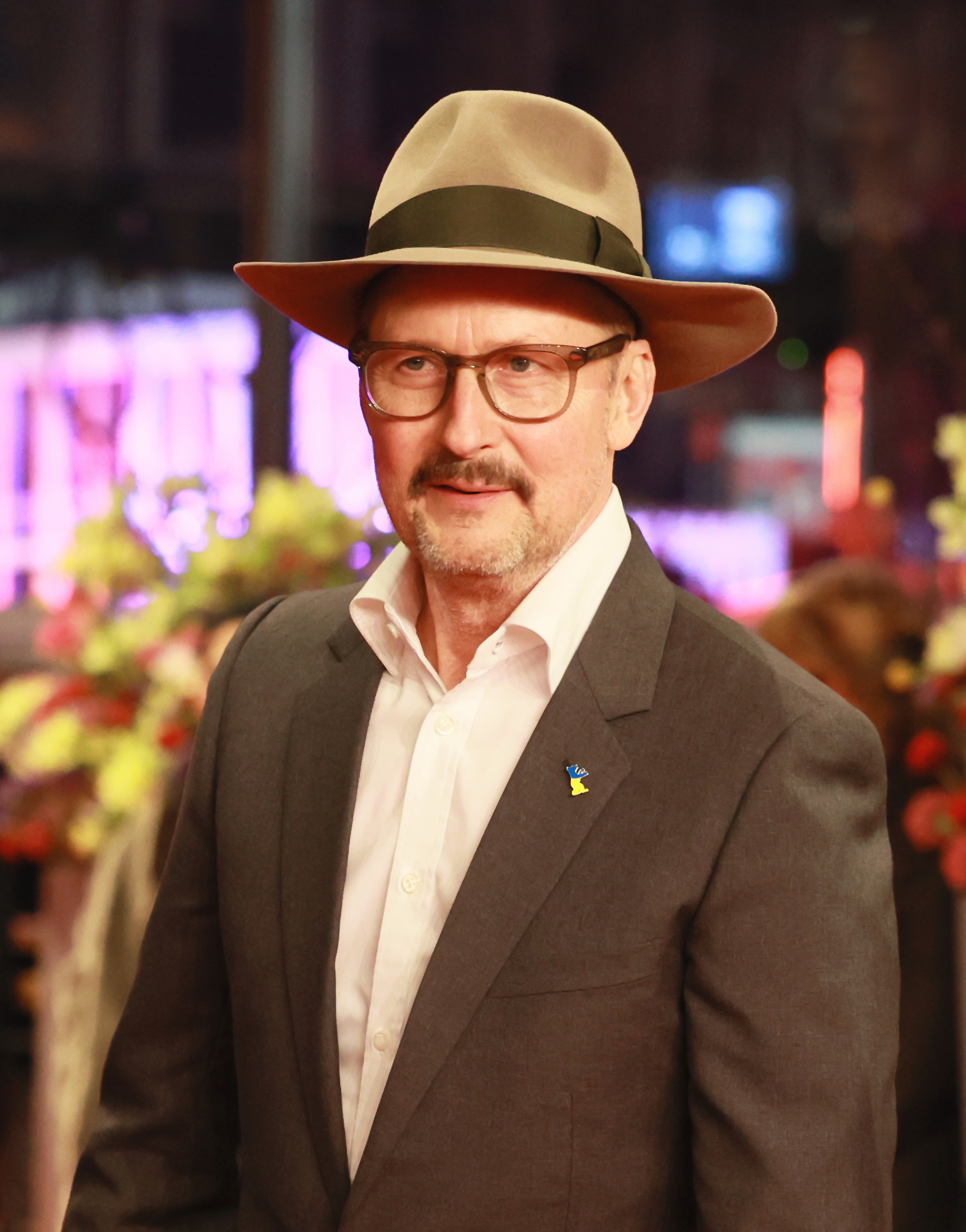
Todd Field, Best Screenplay winner

Winners are listed in boldface along with the runner-up positions and counts from the final round:

=== Best Picture ===
1. **Tár** (61)
2. Aftersun (49)
3. No Bears (32)

=== Best Director ===
1. **Charlotte Wells – Aftersun** (60)
2. Park Chan-wook – Decision to Leave (47)
3. Jafar Panahi – No Bears (36)

=== Best Actor ===
1. **Colin Farrell – After Yang / The Banshees of Inisherin** (71)
2. Paul Mescal – Aftersun (55)
3. Bill Nighy – Living (33)

=== Best Actress ===
1. **Cate Blanchett – Tár** (59)
2. Michelle Yeoh – Everything Everywhere All at Once (38)
3. Tilda Swinton – The Eternal Daughter / Michelle Williams – The Fabelmans (27) **(TIE)**

=== Best Supporting Actor ===
1. **Ke Huy Quan – Everything Everywhere All at Once** (45)
2. Brian Tyree Henry – Causeway (35)
3. Barry Keoghan – The Banshees of Inisherin (27)

=== Best Supporting Actress ===
1. **Kerry Condon – The Banshees of Inisherin** (57)
2. Nina Hoss – Tár (43)
3. Dolly de Leon – Triangle of Sadness (35)

=== Best Screenplay ===
1. **Todd Field – Tár** (61)
2. Martin McDonagh – The Banshees of Inisherin (42)
3. James Gray – Armageddon Time (18)

=== Best Cinematography ===
1. **Michał Dymek – EO** (62)
2. Hoyte van Hoytema – Nope (37)
3. Kim Ji-yong – Decision to Leave (34)

=== Best Film Not in the English Language ===
1. **EO** (43)
2. No Bears (37)
3. Decision to Leave (34)

=== Best Non-Fiction Film ===
1. **All the Beauty and the Bloodshed** (46)
2. Descendant (40)
3. All That Breathes (27)

=== Film Heritage Award ===
- Jeanine Basinger: "one of [the NSFC's] most esteemed and important film scholars, whose work at Wesleyan University and beyond has continually bridged the divide between Hollywood and academia, film studies and movie love."
- Turner Classic Movies: "for a rich array of programming that ranges deep and wide in the history of cinema, a service too easily taken for granted by audiences and worthy of the utmost care and attention from its corporate owners."
- Screen Slate: "published and edited by Jon Dieringer, an essential daily online publication that has done much to build and sustain the filmmaking, theatrical exhibition and film critical communities of New York City and by extension the world at large."

== Dedication ==
This years awards were dedicated to the late Sheila Benson: "an esteemed Society member and the warmest, most gracious of colleagues. As film critic for the Los Angeles Times and other publications, she wrote about movies with infectious joy and enviable skill."
