= Without Description =

2002 Iranian TV series

- بدون شرح
- Genre: Comedy
- Written by: Peyman Ghasemkhani; Soroush Sehhat; Bahman Motamedian; Rima Raminfar; Mehrab Ghasemkhani; Khashayar Alvand; Amir Mahdi Jule
- Directed by: Mehdi Mazloumi
- Starring: Fathali Oveisi; Amir Jafari; Bijan Banafshekhah; Falamak Joneidi; Leyli Rashidi; Reza Shafiei Jam; Shabnam Tolouei; Amir Noori; Mehdi Sabaei; Maryam Saadat; Amir Hossein Sadigh; Ali Ghorban Zadeh
- Country of origin: Iran
- Original language: Persian
- No. of seasons: 1
- No. of episodes: 108

Production
- Production location: Tehran
- Cinematography: Mohammad Reza Kazemi; Zinoldin Allameh
- Editor: Mehdi Mazloumi
- Running time: 35 - 45 minutes

Original release
- Release: 7 July – 24 November 2002

Without Description (Persian: بدون شرح) is an Iranian Comedy series. The series is directed by Mehdi Mazloumi. The series was rebroadcast in 2019 on the iFilm TV channel

== Storyline ==
Without Description is the story of the office of a weekly newspaper called The Beautiful City, which is financially struggling and is on verge of bankruptcy.

== Cast ==
- Fathali Oveisi
- Amir Jafari
- Bijan Banafshekhah
- Falamak Joneidi
- Leyli Rashidi
- Reza Shafiei Jam
- Shabnam Tolouei
- Amir Noori
- Mehdi Sabaei
- Maryam Saadat
- Amir Hossein Sadigh
- Ali Ghorban Zadeh
- Shabnam Tolouei
- Mahmoud Basiri
- Sima Motalebi
- Roksana Razavi
- Katayoun Amirebrahimi
- Mahshad Mokhberi
- Ramin Sayardashti
