= Mathieu Spinosi =

French actor (born 1990)

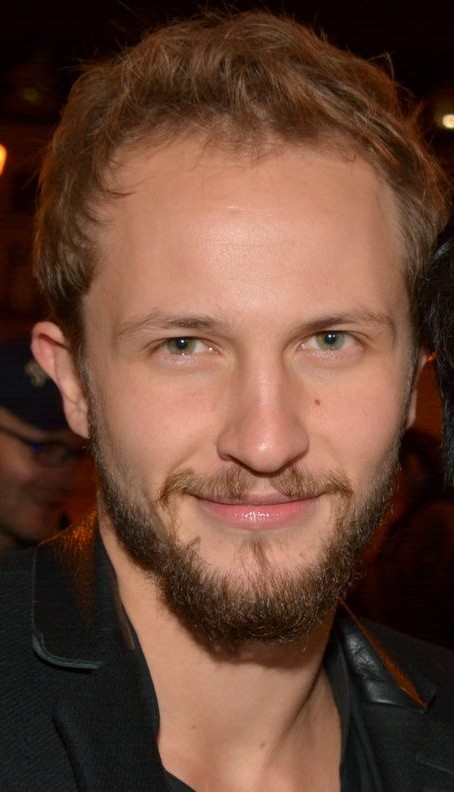
- Mathieu Spinosi in January 2016.
- Born: 6 June 1990 (age 36); Brest, France
- Occupation: Actor
- Years active: 2009–present

Mathieu Spinosi (born 6 June 1990) is a French actor.

== Life and career ==
He is the son of the violinist and conductor Jean-Christophe Spinosi. Student on the Cours Florent, he is also a violinist and member of the Ensemble Matheus founded by his father. He is also admitted to the CNSAD and begins his first year from September 2011.

== Filmography ==
Year	Title	Role	Director	Notes
2009	Neuilly sa mère!	Guilain Lambert	Gabriel Julien-Laferrière	
2010	Victoire Bonnot	Nathan Martins	Philippe Dajoux	TV series (1 episode)
2010–2015	Clem	Julien Brimont	Joyce Buñuel	TV series (15 episodes)
2012	Transparence	President	Martin Guyot & Ivan Rousseau	Short
2012	Le désert de l'amour	Raymond Courrèges	Jean-Daniel Verhaeghe	TV movie
2013	Une femme dans la Révolution	Alexandre de Valbreuse	Jean-Daniel Verhaeghe (2)	TV mini-series
2014	Les Yeux jaunes des crocodiles	Gary	Cécile Telerman	
2014	Les nuits d'été	Quéméner / Chérubin	Mario Fanfani	
2015	Memories	Romain	Jean-Paul Rouve	
2016	Les Visiteurs: La Révolution	Louis Antoine de Saint-Just	Jean-Marie Poiré	
2017	Guyane	Vincent Ogier	Kim Chapiron, Philippe Triboit, Fabien Nury	TV series (8 episodes)
2017	La Mélodie		Rachid Hami	

== Theatre ==
- 2011: A Streetcar Named Desire
