= Beauty and the Beast (2014 film) =

- Theatrical Poster
- Directed by: Christophe Gans
- Written by: Christophe Gans; Sandra Vo-Anh
- Based on: Beauty and the Beast by Gabrielle-Suzanne Barbot de Villeneuve
- Produced by: Richard Grandpierre
- Starring: Vincent Cassel; Léa Seydoux
- Cinematography: Christophe Beaucarne
- Edited by: Sébastien Prangère
- Music by: Pierre Adenot
- Production companies: Eskwad; Pathé; Studio Babelsberg
- Distributed by: Pathé Distribution (France); Concorde Filmverleih (Germany)
- Release dates: 12 February 2014 (France); 14 February 2014 (Berlin)
- Running time: 112 minutes
- Countries: France; Germany
- Language: French
- Budget: €35 million
- Box office: US$47.4 million

Beauty and the Beast (French: La Belle et la Bête) is a 2014 romantic fantasy film based on the traditional fairy tale of the same name by Gabrielle-Suzanne Barbot de Villeneuve. Written by Christophe Gans and Sandra Vo-Anh and directed by Gans, the film stars Léa Seydoux as Belle and Vincent Cassel as the Beast.

The film was screened out of competition at the 64th Berlin International Film Festival and was released in France on 12 February 2014 to generally mixed-to-negative reviews, yet was a box office success. It was nominated for the People's Choice Award for Best European Film at the 27th European Film Awards. It also received three nominations at the 40th César Awards, winning Best Production Design for Thierry Flamand.

== Plot ==
A widowed merchant is forced to move to the countryside after going bankrupt, with his six children. His daughter, Belle is the only one happy with the change. When one of the merchant's ships is found, the merchant prepares to return to reclaim his assets. While his two oldest and youngest spoiled daughters give him a long list of expensive things to bring back for them, Belle asks only for a rose. The merchant arrives and learns that the ship and its cargo have been taken to settle his debts. On the way home, he gets lost and stumbles upon the castle of the Beast, where all of his needs are magically met, including food, the items his daughters had asked him for and his injured horse, cured. He departs and picks a rose in the garden for Belle. He is confronted by the Beast, who now accused him of stealing what he was given by the Beast's servants. As punishment, the Beast demands that the merchant return after saying goodbye to his children. After learning of her father's fate, Belle, feeling responsible, takes his place.

At the castle, Belle is given permission to roam the grounds, but must have dinner with the Beast every evening. She has a dream, revealing the prince's past: that he enjoyed hunting, but often ignored the Princess who loved him and was lonely. The prince is after an elusive golden deer and when the princess asks him to stop hunting it, he promises to do so if she will give him a son. At dinner, the Beast attempts to charm her, only to be rejected, which angers him. He later apologizes for his behavior. Belle says she will dance with him if she is allowed to see her family one last time. The Beast asks for Belle's love but she demands to see her family first. When he refuses, she rejects him once again. That night, she witnesses the Beast prey upon a hog. Shocked, she attempts to escape only for the Beast to catch up on the frozen lake. As Belle is pinned, they almost kiss but the ice breaks beneath her. He saves her and brings her back to the castle. He agrees to let her return home, giving her a small vial of healing water. He states that if she does not return to him in one day, he will die.

Belle goes home, where her father is bedridden and dying. Her eldest brother, Maxime finds a jewel on her clothing. Figuring that the castle may contain further treasures, he wants to get it to settle his debt to gangster Perducas. He leads Perducas and his gang to the castle. Belle has another dream about how the prince broke his promise to the princess and killed the golden deer. While dying, the deer transformed into the princess, revealing she was the Nymph of the Forest who became human because she wanted to experience love. Her father, the God of the Forest, transformed the prince into a beast as punishment, proclaiming that only the true love of a woman would break the Beast's curse. Belle gives her father the vial of water, healing him. She goes to the castle with her younger brother Tristan, arriving just as the Beast is about to kill the invaders. He stops when she begs for mercy. Perducas stabs the Beast, mortally wounding him. Suddenly, vines sprout about the castle. Perducas is killed by the vines and turned into a human tree. Belle and her brothers place the Beast into the healing pool of water. Dying, the Beast asks whether Belle could ever love him, and she counters that she already does. The Beast transforms back into his human form.

The story is being told by Belle to her two young children. They are living in the same countryside house, with Belle's father, who is now a flower merchant. Belle goes outside to greet her husband, the prince, and the two embrace.

== Cast ==
- Vincent Cassel as Beast/Prince
- Léa Seydoux as Belle
- André Dussollier as Merchant, Belle's father
- Eduardo Noriega as Perducas
- Audrey Lamy as Anne, Belle's Older sister
- Sara Giraudeau as Clotilde, Belle's Younger sister
- Nicolas Gob as Maxime, Belle's brother
- Myriam Charleins as Astrid, Perducas's clairvoyant lover
- Jonathan Demurger as Jean-Baptiste, Belle's brother
- Louka Meliava as Tristan, Belle's brother
- Yvonne Catterfeld as Princess, the Prince's late wife
- Dejan Bućin as Louis

== Production ==
Principal photography took place in Germany, at the Babelsberg Studio in Potsdam-Babelsberg, from November 2012 to February 2013, on a production budget of €35 million. The film was also dubbed in English.

== Reception ==
=== Box office ===
The film earned a total of US$49.1 million internationally. In Japan, the film topped the box office on its release, making it the first non-English-language foreign film to top the Japanese box office since Red Cliff II in 2009, and the first French film to top the Japanese box office since Mathieu Kassovitz's The Crimson Rivers in 2001.

=== Critical response ===
==== France ====
In France, the film received mixed reviews. Le Monde evokes a "luxurious facelift that smooths and models the tale to bring it up to date with techno-ecological standards". Télérama describes a film with "chic pompiérisme", filled with "flat dialogues", that we watch "without being moved". Le Figaro writes that "Christophe Gans films without ever moving".

France Télévisions called the film Christophe Gans' "greatest success". They praised the colours and contrasts of the landscape, which they said recalled the work of American painter Maxfield Parrish, and the visual style, which they compared to films by Mario Bava and Tsui Hark. They also noted that Gans had successfully differentiated the film from the source material and prior adaptations, while keeping the "spirit" of the original story. Laurent Pecha of EcranLarge remarked that while the film was "far from perfect", it was "so ambitious" compared to the "doldrums" of French cinema that Gans won her over. She called the introduction "spectacular" and praised Gans for his willingness to make the audience believe the "incredible and improbable love story", praising the "excellent" Seydoux and Cassel.

Writing for TF1, Olivier Corriez gave the film 4 stars out of 5 and remarked that it was not easy to offer a modern interpretation of Beauty and the Beast as it had been adapted so many times before, but found Gans' film "flamboyant" but "accessible to all audiences". He said that it "plays wonderfully on contrasts" and praised Seydoux for her "charm and tenderness" and Cassel for providing "brutality [and] weakness."

==== International ====
International reviews for the film were mostly mixed-to-negative. Although the visuals and production design were praised, storytelling was criticized. On review aggregator website Rotten Tomatoes, the film has an approval rating of 41%, based on 27 reviews and the average rating is 5.12/10. On Metacritic, which assigns a normalised rating out of 100, the film has a score of 39 based on 10 reviews, indicating "generally unfavorable reviews".

Jessica Kiang of IndieWire thought the film was "immensely, crushingly boring" and Seydoux wasted in a role that required her to do little more than "heave her breasts and fall over things prettily."

== See also ==
- List of French films of 2014
