= Mina Kavani =

Iranian-French actress

- مینا کاوانی
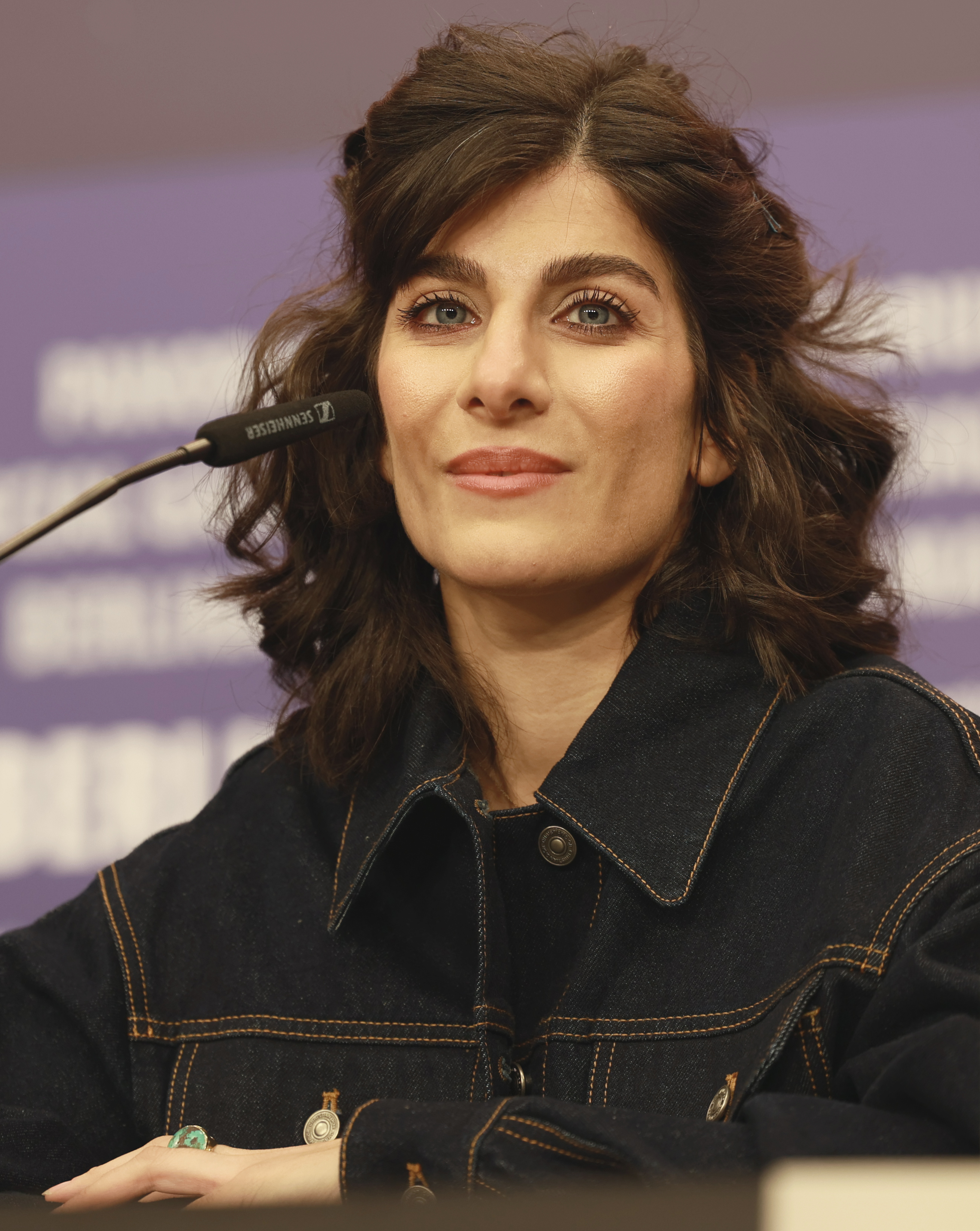
- Kavani at the 2023 Berlin International Film Festival
- Born: Mina Khosrovani; May 23 1989; Tehran, Iran
- Citizenship: Iran; France
- Education: Tehran School of Dramatic Arts (B.A.)
- Occupation: Actress
- Years active: 2010–present

Mina Khosrovani (Persian: مینا خسروانی; born May 23 1989 known professionally as Mina Kavani (مینا کاوانی), is an Iranian-French (Note: Kavani became a French citizen.) actress. She is best known for her role in No Bears (2022), which won the Special Jury Prize at the 79th Venice International Film Festival.

== Early life and career ==
Mina Kavani was born in Tehran. Brought up into an artistic family, and niece of the well-known film and play director Ali Raffi, she graduated from the Conservatoire national supérieur d'art dramatique (CNSAD) in Paris.

Fascinated by acting from an early age, she started participating regularly at her uncle's rehearsals at the age of twelve. At sixteen she made her debut in the play It Doesn't Snow in Egypt under the direction of her uncle and on the stage of Tehran's City Theatre, inaugurating her career in Iran as a stage actress. She soon had roles in plays such as: Othello (Desdemona), Antigone (Antigone), La Musica and J'étais dans ma maison et j'attendais que la pluie vienne.

Kavani has collaborated with some of Iran's most crucial film and theatre directors. At the age of twenty-three, she moved back to Paris and entered the Conservatoire National Supérieur as part of the Jean Damien Barbin's class, during the time in which Daniel Mesguich was the director.

In 2012, she voiced the role of Sahar in the Oscar winning film Argo directed by Ben Affleck.

In 2013, Kavani played the protagonist Sara in Sepideh Farsi's film Red Rose. The film was presented on international festivals such as the Toronto Film Festival, the Festival de Marrakech, and the Chicago International Film Festival. Due to the film containing some nudity, Kavani became the centre of threats made by the Iranian media, resulting in her exile. She received her political refugee status with the support of Isabelle Huppert and Bertrand Bonello who had praised her performance in the movie.

In 2014, Kavani performed on the stage of l'Odéon-Théâtre de l'Europe, reciting poems by the Iranian contemporary poet Forugh Farrokhzad under the direction of Roland Timsit. In 2015, she appeared at Auditorium Orchestre National de Lyon with the notable French actor Jean-Damien Barbin, performing Happy Days Shakespeare.

In the same year, she was chosen as one of the juries (next to actress Marisa Berenson) at the Rencontre Cinemathographique de Cannes. Patrick de Carolis was the president of the jury.

In 2015 and 2016, she portrayed the celebrated contemporary Austrian poet Ingeborg Bachmann in the play Malina by Barbara Hutt, during the Festival d'Avignon. In 2016, she played Lili in the short film Sous Transe by Moroccan filmmaker Camélia Montassere.

In 2017–18, Kavani played the role of Ipek in Snow, a theatrical adaptation of the eponymous novel by Turkish writer Orhan Pamuk (winner of the 2006 Nobel Prize in Literature) directed by Blandine Savetier of the National Theatre of Strasbourg (TNS). The play was performed all over France and China.

In 2022, she starred in Jafar Panahi's No Bears, which won the special jury prize at the 79th Venice International Film Festival. Later in 2024, she was part of the ensemble cast of Reading Lolita in Tehran, starring alongside fellow Iranian actresses Golshifteh Farahani and Zar Amir Ebrahimi.

== Personal life ==
Kavani moved to France in 2010 and acquired French citizenship.

== Filmography ==
=== Film ===
Year	Title	Role	Director	Notes	Ref(s)
2010	Mr. Yousef	Sara	Ali Rafi'i		
2012	Argo	Sahar (voice)	Ben Affleck		
2014	Red Rose	Sara	Sepideh Farsi		
2016	My Dad Talks Bullshit		Shahriar Shandiz	Short film	
2018	Under Trance	Lili	Camélia Montassere	Short film	
2020	Decent People	La-sage woman	Maxime Roy	Short film	
2021	Undercover	Entourage Karim Fassi	Thierry de Peretti		
2021	Hydrangeas in Winter	Parvineh	Hélène Rastegar	Short film	
2022	The Girl and the Boy	Malina	Jean-Marie Besset		
2022	No Bears	Zara	Jafar Panahi		
2023	The Siren	(voice)	Sepideh Farsi	Animated film	
2024	Reading Lolita in Tehran	Nassrin	Eran Riklis		
