= Memories (2014 film) =

- Film poster
- Directed by: Jean-Paul Rouve
- Screenplay by: David Foenkinos; Jean-Paul Rouve
- Based on: Les souvenirs by David Foenkinos
- Produced by: Maxime Delauney; Romain Rousseau; Thierry Ardisson
- Starring: Annie Cordy; Michel Blanc; Mathieu Spinosi; Chantal Lauby
- Distributed by: Nolita Cinema
- Release dates: 23 August 2014 (Angoulême); 14 January 2015 (France)
- Running time: 92 minutes
- Country: France
- Language: French
- Budget: $6.1 million
- Box office: $8.1 million

Memories (French: Les Souvenirs) is a 2014 French comedy drama film directed by Jean-Paul Rouve.

== Plot ==
While 23 years old nightporter Romain Esnart dreams about writing a great novel his father becomes a pensioner. Romain's father Michel doesn't like his new life and neither does his wife Nathalie like to have him around moping all the time. When Romain's 85 years old grandmother Madeleine runs away from a retirement home, the family friction is rocketing. Eventually Romain receives a postcard from Madeleine who visits Normandy. He borrows his father's car and joins her. As he learns she once attended a certain school when she was a little girl. Thanks to an understanding female young teacher she is allowed to get to know the pupils who are now as old as she was when she had to leave back then. Yet in the end it turns out that all this joy has been too exciting for her health. Time has come for Romain to say adieu.

== Cast ==
- Annie Cordy as Madeleine Esnart
- Michel Blanc as Michel Esnart
- Mathieu Spinosi as Romain Esnart
- Chantal Lauby as Nathalie Esnart
- William Lebghil as Karim
- Flore Bonaventura as Louise
- Jean-Paul Rouve as Philippe
- Audrey Lamy as Director of the nursing home
- Xavier Briere as Pierre Esnart
- Yvan Garouel as Patrick Esnart
- Blanche Gardin as the tourist office clerk
- Arnaud Henriet as the cop
- Jacques Boudet as the painter
- Daniel Morin as the cashier
- Laurent Cléry as the receptionist
- Arthur Benzaquen as the yoga instructor
- Philippe Dusseau as the neighbour
- Zohra Benali as Karim's mother
- Jean-Michel Lahmi as Michel's boss

== Production ==
The film premiered at the Angoulême Francophone Film Festival on 23 August 2014. Annie Cordy and the entire crew received a standing-ovation at the end of the projection.

On 5 October 2014, the film was also screened at the Festival International du Film Francophone de Namur, where it was also praised by the audience. On 11 October 2014, the film was screened at the "Festival International du Film de Saint Jean de Luz".

== Reception ==
The Hollywood Reporter's Jordan Mintzer judged Les Souvenirs as a "pleasant" film and described it as easygoing "family dramedy".
A number of French celebrities including journalist Yves Bigot, and TV host Daniela Lumbroso suggested on social media Annie Cordy should be awarded a César Award for her performance as Madeleine. Cordy went on to receive a nomination for Best Actress at the 6th Magritte Awards.
