= Summer Nights (2014 film) =

- Film poster
- Les nuits d'été
- Directed by: Mario Fanfani
- Written by: Mario Fanfani; Gaëlle Macé; Philippe Mangeot
- Produced by: Lola Gans
- Starring: Guillaume de Tonquédec; Jeanne Balibar; Nicolas Bouchaud; Mathieu Spinosi
- Cinematography: Georges Lechaptois
- Edited by: François Quiqueré
- Music by: Rodolphe Burger
- Production company: 24 Mai Productions
- Release date: 29 August 2014 (Venice)
- Running time: 104 minutes
- Country: France
- Language: French

Summer Nights (French: Les nuits d'été) is a French drama film, directed by Mario Fanfani and released in 2014. The film stars Guillaume de Tonquédec as Michel, a married man who has a secret life as a cross-dresser who goes by the drag name Mylène.

The film premiered at the 2014 Venice Film Festival, where it won the Queer Lion award as the best LGBTQ-themed film of the festival.

== Cast ==
- Guillaume de Tonquédec : Michel Aubertin / Mylène
- Jeanne Balibar : Hélène
- Nicolas Bouchaud : Jean-Marie / Flavia
- Mathieu Spinosi : Quéméner / Chérubin
- Clément Sibony : Suzy Corridor
- Zazie De Paris : Hermine
- Jean-Benoît Mollet : Callipyge
- Yannick Choirat : Georg Schaeffer / Yvonne
- Évelyne Didi : Jeanine
- Florence Thomassin : Florence Weissweiller
- François Rollin : Georges Weissweiller
