= Red Rose (2014 film) =

2014 film

- Film poster
- Directed by: Sepideh Farsi
- Written by: Javad Djavahery; Sepideh Farsi
- Produced by: Thierry Lenouvel
- Starring: Mina Kavani; Vassilis Koukalani; Shabnam Tolouei
- Cinematography: Pantelis Mantzanas
- Edited by: Bonita Papastathi
- Music by: Ibrahim Maalouf
- Distributed by: UDI
- Release dates: 7 September 2014 (TIFF); 3 June 2015 (France)
- Running time: 87 minutes
- Countries: France; Greece; Iran
- Language: Persian

Red Rose (Persian: گل سرخ) is a 2014 internationally co-produced drama film directed by Sepideh Farsi. It was screened in the Contemporary World Cinema section at the 2014 Toronto International Film Festival.

== Cast ==
- Mina Kavani
- Vassilis Koukalani
- Shabnam Tolouei
- Rezvan Zandieh
- Babak Farahani
- Shirin Manian
- Hassan Malekian Ardestani
