= Fiston =

- Film poster
- Directed by: Pascal Bourdiaux
- Written by: Daive Cohen
- Produced by: Nadia Khamlichi; Adrian Politowski; Gilles Waterkeyn
- Starring: Kev Adams; Franck Dubosc
- Cinematography: Yannick Ressigeac
- Edited by: Florent Vassault
- Music by: Alexis Rault
- Production companies: uFilm; Monkey Pack Films
- Distributed by: SND Films
- Release date: 12 March 2014 (France)
- Running time: 88 minutes
- Country: France
- Language: French
- Budget: $8 million
- Box office: $16.3 million

Fiston is a 2014 French comedy film directed by Pascal Bourdiaux and starring Franck Dubosc and Kev Adams.

== Cast ==
- Kev Adams: Alex
- Franck Dubosc: Antoine Chamoine
- Nora Arnezeder: Sandra
- Valérie Benguigui: Sophie
- Helena Noguerra: Monica
- Alice Isaaz: Elie
- Laurent Bateau: Benoît Legrand
- Danièle Évenou: Gigi
