= The Missionaries =

2014 film by Tonie Marshall

- Theatrical release poster
- French: Tu veux ou tu veux pas
- Directed by: Tonie Marshall
- Screenplay by: Tonie Marshall; Erwan Augoyard (Note: Collaboration); Sophie Kovess-Brun
- Adaptation and dialogue by: Tonie Marshall; Nicolas Mercier
- Produced by: Tonie Marshall; Bruno Pésery
- Starring: Sophie Marceau; Patrick Bruel; André Wilms; François Morel; Philippe Lellouche; Sylvie Vartan
- Cinematography: Pascal Ridao
- Edited by: Jacques Comets; Stan Collet
- Music by: Philippe Cohen-Solal; Christophe Chassol; Loïk Dury; Christophe "Disco" Minck
- Production companies: Tabo Tabo Films; Arena Productions; Cinéfrance 1888; TF1 Films Production; Entre Chien et Loup
- Distributed by: Warner Bros. Pictures (France); Alternative Films (Belgium)
- Release dates: 22 August 2014 (Angoulême); 1 October 2014 (France and Belgium)
- Running time: 111 minutes
- Countries: France; Belgium
- Language: French
- Budget: €10.7 million ($11.5 million)
- Box office: $9.3 million

The Missionaries (French: Tu veux ou tu veux pas, lit. 'Do You Want It or Not'), also known as Sex, Love & Therapy, is a 2014 romantic comedy film co-written, produced and directed by Tonie Marshall. The film stars Sophie Marceau and Patrick Bruel.

== Cast ==
- Sophie Marceau as Judith Chabrier
- Patrick Bruel as Lambert Levallois
- André Wilms as Michel Chabrier
- Sylvie Vartan as Nadine Levallois
- François Morel as Alain
- Philippe Lellouche as Bruno
- Jean-Pierre Marielle as himself
- Patrick Braoudé as L'écureuil
- Claude Perron as Fabienne Lavial
- Pascal Demolon as Christian Lavial
- Marie Rivière as Martine
- Philippe Harel as Jacques
- Scali Delpeyrat as Pierre Joubert
- Camille Panonacle as Valérie Joubert
- Fanny Sidney as Véronique
- Thomas Sagols as Luc
- Laurent Heynemann as Le barbu
- Fabienne Galula as Annie
- Alexia Barlier as Daphné
