= Get Well Soon (film) =

- Theatrical release poster
- Directed by: Jean Becker
- Screenplay by: Jean Becker; Jean-Loup Dabadie
- Based on: Bon rétablissement by Marie-Sabine Roger
- Produced by: Louis Becker
- Starring: Gérard Lanvin
- Cinematography: Jean-Claude Larrieu
- Edited by: Jacques Witta; Franck Nakache
- Music by: Nathaniel Méchaly
- Production companies: ICE3; K.J.B. Production; SND Films; France 3 Cinéma; Rhône-Alpes Cinéma
- Distributed by: SND Films
- Release dates: 16 June 2014 (Champs-Élysées Film Festival); 17 September 2014 (France)
- Running time: 81 minutes
- Country: France
- Language: French
- Budget: €8 million
- Box office: $4.1 million

Get Well Soon (French: Bon rétablissement !) is a 2014 French comedy film written and directed by Jean Becker.

== Cast ==
- Gérard Lanvin as Pierre Laurent
- Fred Testot as Le capitaine Maxime Leroy
- Jean-Pierre Darroussin as Hervé Laurent
- Swann Arlaud as Camille
- Daniel Guichard as Serge
- Anne-Sophie Lapix as Florence
- Claudia Tagbo as Myriam
- Philippe Rebbot as Thierry
- Mona Jabeur as Maëva
- Louis-Do de Lencquesaing as The surgeon
- Isabelle Candelier as Claudine Laurent
- Maurane as Françoise
