= Sepideh Farsi =

Iranian film director (born 1965)

- سپیده فارسی
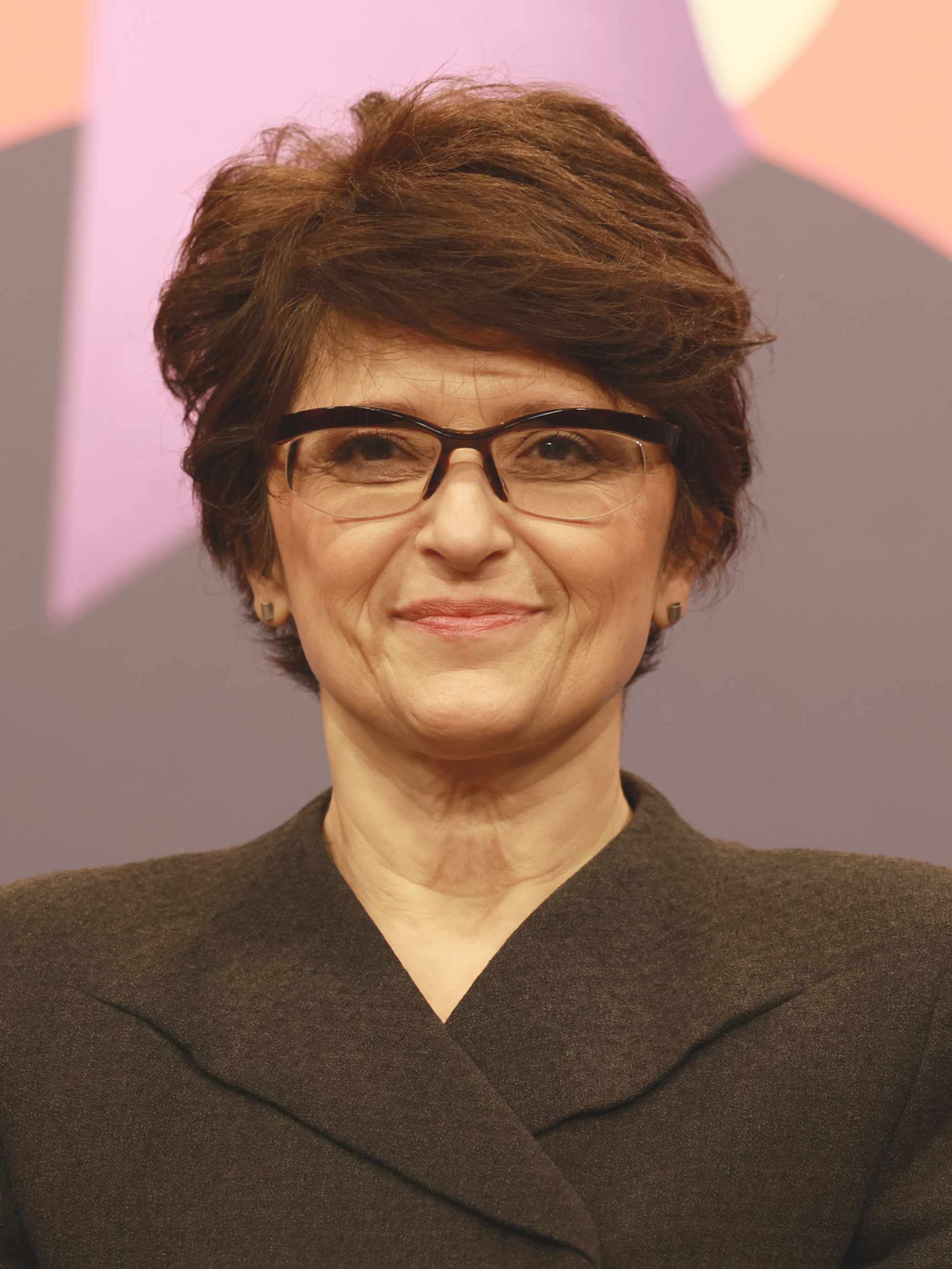
- Farsi at the 2023 Berlin International Film Festival
- Born: 1965 (age 60–61); Tehran, Iran
- Occupation: Film director
- Children: 1
- Awards: FIPRESCI award Cinéma du Réel; Traces de Vie award (2001)

Sepideh Farsi (Persian: سپیده فارسی; born 1965) is an Iranian film director.

== Early life and education ==
Born in a politically active, left-wing family, Farsi became an activist at a young age. She moved from Tehran to Mashhad shortly before the 1979 revolution, and spent eight months in prison for hiding a friend and fellow student during the 1981–1982 Iran Massacres. She finished secondary school at home after her release and left Iran in 1984 for Paris to study mathematics. She was drawn to the visual arts at an early age, and initially experimented in photography before making her first short films.

== Film career ==
Her 2009 film Tehran Bedun-e Mojavvez (Tehran Without Permission), an 83-minute documentary, shows life in Iran's crowded capital city of Tehran, during a time when the regime faced international sanctions over its nuclear ambitions and experiencing civil unrest. It was shot entirely with a Nokia camera phone because of the government’s restrictions over shooting films. The documentary shows various aspects of city life including following women at the hairdresser talking of the latest fads, young men speaking of drugs, prostitution and other societal problems, and the Iranian rapper “Hichkas”. The dialogue is in Persian with English and Arabic subtitles. In December 2009, Tehran Without Permission was shown at the Dubai International Film Festival.

In February 2023, Farsi's first animated feature, The Siren (French: La Sirène), premiered as the opening film of the 73rd Berlin International Film Festival's Panorama section. The film, following a boy in the port of Abadan in 1980 during the outbreak of the Iran-Iraq war, won Best Animated Film at the 16th Asia Pacific Screen Awards in the Gold Coast, Australia, in November 2023.

In March 2024, she was a member of the Fiction Competition Jury at the 22d International Film Festival and Forum on Human Rights.

Her 2025 film Put Your Soul on Your Hand and Walk was accepted into the Cannes ACID section. The film documents life in Gaza during the Israeli military campaign with Farsi being motivated to show it through the eyes of a Gaza resident after seeing different depictions of the same attacks on different media channels. Filming started in April 2024 and was done remotely, as the film's subject, photojournalist Fatima Hassouna, sent Farsi self-recorded footage for editing with interviews being done via video calls. On 16 April 2025, the day after it was accepted into ACID, an Israeli airstrike killed Hassona alongside nine of her family members. At the time, Farsi and Hassona were trying to find a way for Hassona to travel to Cannes and return to Gaza after the festival's conclusion.

Beyond directing, Farsi has appeared in the front of the camera in her 2002 film The Journey of Maryam, and in multiple other positions behind the camera on her own works, most notably the one-woman-film Homi D. Sethna, Filmmaker.

Farsi can not return to Iran since 2009 due to her films and her activism against the Iranian regime. To this day, all of Farsi's films have been banned in Iran by the regime.

In 2026, Farsi joined 800 other Hollywood professionals signing a statement calling to condemn Iranian government, for the atrocities it committed during the 2025-2026 Iranian protests, against civilians protesting against repression, poverty, discrimination, and structural injustice.

== Personal life ==
Farsi divides her time between Paris and Athens. She speaks Persian, English, French, Greek and German.

== Awards and recognition ==
Farsi was a Member of the Jury of the Locarno International Film Festival in Best First Feature in 2009. She won the FIPRESCI Prize (2002), Cinéma du Réel and Traces de Vie prize (2001) for "Homi D. Sethna, filmmaker" and Best documentary prize in Festival dei Popoli (2007) for "HARAT".

== Filmography ==
Year	Title
1993	Bād-e shomāl / Northwind
1997	Khab-e āb / Water dreams
1999	Donyā khāne-ye man ast / The world is my home
2000	Homi D. Sethna, filmmaker
2001	Mardān-e ātash / Men of Fire
2002	Safar-e Mariam / The journey of Maryam
2003	Khāb-e khāk / Dreams of Dust
2006	Negāh / The Gaze
2007	Harāt
2008	If it were Icarus
2009	Tehrān bedun-e mojavvez / Tehran without permission
2010	Zir-e āb / The house under the water
2013	Cloudy Greece
2014	Red Rose
2023	La Sirène / The Siren
2025	Put Your Soul on Your Hand and Walk
