= Shabnam Tolouei =

Iranian actress and theatre director

- شبنم طلوعی
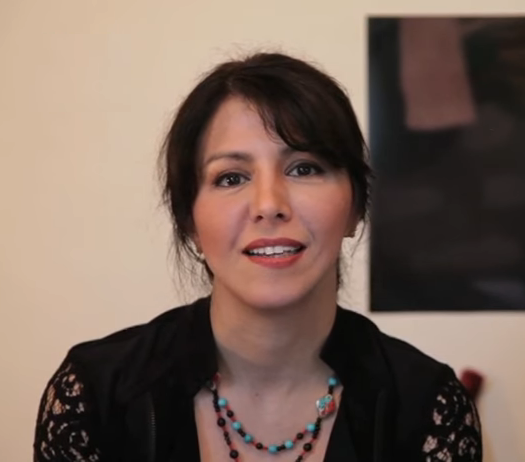
- Tolouei in 2016
- Born: April 12, 1971 (age 55); Tehran, Iran
- Occupations: Actress, Filmmaker, Playwright
- Years active: 1990–Present

Shabnam Tolouei (also spelt Toluie, Tolui or Tolooee, Persian: شبنم طلوعی, born April 12, 1971 in Tehran) is an Iranian and French Naturalized actress, theatre director and playwright. She is currently forbidden from working in Iran by the government because of her religion, the Baháʼí Faith, which is subject to state sanctioned persecution. Since December 2004 she has been living in Paris, France.

== Life ==
Tolouei studied filmmaking in Tehran, at Bagh-Ferdos Film School, and has her B.A. in Theatre Studies from Université Paris X, Nanterre, France. She has written short stories for cultural magazines since 1990, acted on stage since 1993, and written plays since 1994. Since 2002, she has also taught the bio-mechanic method and acting for camera at the Kranameh Culture and Art Training Institute in Tehran, as well as online and in-person acting workshops in the US.

=== Theatre ===
- Trust Me (actress) Director Maziar Miri, 2026
- LEILI (Director and Actress), Los Angeles, Arizona, Orange County, Vancouver, San Francisco, 2025
- SHAHAK and MAHAK, in collaboration with Gordafarid (Actress), Los Angeles, Washington DC, San Diego, Mountain View, Arizona 2025
- THE ART OF IMPROVISATION (actress) with Shahrokh Moshkin Ghalam, Pejman Hadadi, Behfar Bahadoran, performed at Stanford University, Munich, Canada, Seattle, Arizona, Orange County, Los Angeles, Fresno 2023
- Diaspora (Director and actor) performed at Stanford University 2023
- Tarabnameh (Actress) by Bahram Beyzaei, performed at Stanford University 2016
- Bahman-bagdad (playwright and dictor), Krefeld, 2010-2012 for Krefeld city theatre in German Language with german actors 2010-2012
- Autumn Dance (director/playwright/actress) performed in Persian and French language 2011-2017
- L'entretien (as director and actress )/a Persian play by Mohammad Rahmanian, performed in French/Lilas En Scène/ Paris 2006
- Louvre vue d'ailleurs, musical performance, in Louvre Museum / teamwork /Paris 2005
- Autumn Dance (director/playwright/actress) performed in Bing Studio Theatre, Stanford University 2017
- Autumn Dance, Stockholm, 9th Women Playwrights International, 2012
- Autumn Dance (director/playwright/actress) performed in Persian and French language in paris/prague/stockholm/toronto/jonkoping 2011-2013
- Bitter Coffee, Silk Road Theatre Festival in Ruhr, Mulheim, Germany, 2003
- Kiss you and Tears, Far and Near East Festival in Berlin, Germany
- Kiss you and Tears, Silk Road Theatre Festival in Ruhr, Mulheim, Germany, 2004
- Kiss you and Tears, Sharjah Festival, Sharjah, UAE, 2005
- Kiss you and Tears, Berlin, Wiesbaden, Stuttgart, Heidelberg, Freiburg Germany, 2006
- Romeo and Juliet, Shakespeare (Directed by Ali Raffi)
- The one thousand and first night (Written and Directed by Bahram Bayzai)
- Blood wedding, lorka (Directed by Ali Raffi)
- Shazde Ehtedjab, Hooshang Golshiri (Directed by Ali Raffi)
- The Maids, Jean Genet (Directed by Ali Raffi)
- Bizhan and Manizhe (Epic play based on Ferdowsi's Shahname) directed by Pari Saberi
- Kiss you and Tears, Charmshir (Directed by Mohammad Aghebati)
- Roya's room ( Actress) Afrooz Foroozand
- On the Earth (Actress) Afrooz Foroozand
- Hamzad (Actress) Amir Dejakam
- Cries and demands by the city wall, Tankred Dorst, Directed by Hassan Majouni
- Tomorrow (Director, Playwright, Actress)
- Morad (Playwright, Actress) directed by Zahra Sabri
- The 7th Act (Director, Playwright, Actress), 1995
- Bitter Coffee (Director, Playwright) (Social drama, published in 2003)
- Bahman Baghdad (Director, Playwright with Amir Aghaee)(a Romance based on Iran–Iraq War), 2003

=== Novels ===
- My Dear Actor (Bazigar-e aziz-e man) (Cheshmeh Publication, ISBN 964-362-035-2), 2002

=== Acting in feature films ===
- Mitra/Kaweh Modiri/Baldr Film Production
- Red Rose/Sepideh Farsi/ feature film/ 2013
- Women Without Men/ Shirin Neshat/ feature film/ 2009
- Munes (Shirin Neshat/ Video installation) 2007
- Au dernier recours (Nazmjou) Paris, 2006
- A house Built on Water (directed by Bahman Farmanara)
- Sharareh (directed by Siamak Shayeghi)
- The Day I Became a Woman (directed by Marzieh Meshkini)
- A notebook from the heaven, (daftari az aseman) Parviz Sheykh Tadi
- Chocolate, Afshin Sherkat
- A flower for Maryam, Hassan Aghakarimi

=== Acting in TV series ===
- Hamsafar, Ghasem Jafari
- Inspector shamsi and madame, Marziye Boroumand
- Without Description, Mehdi Mazloumi
- A field where reeds grow (Neyestan), Mohamad Mokhtari

=== Acting in short films ===
- No one talks to no one (Hich kas ba hich kas harf nemizanad), Bonakdar& Alimohammadi
- Love is alone (Eshgh tanhast), Bonakdar & Alimohammadi
- Desert of the mirrors (Kavir-e ayeneha), Bonakdar & Alimohammadi

=== Awards ===
- The Best Actress in 14th International Fajre Theatre Festival, Iran, 1996
- The Second Best playwright in 14th International Fajre Theatre Festival, Iran, 1996
- The Second Best Actress in 15th International Fajre Theatre Festival, Iran, 1997
- The Second Best Director in 21st International Fajre Theatre Festival, Iran, 2003
- The Best Actress in 22nd International Fajre Theatre Festival, Iran, 2004

=== Film Making ===
- 1100, A SHORT FILM (as filmmaker and actress) 2023
- Les étoiles, a documentary about women and violence (as filmmaker and editor) editing in progress, USA and France 2018-2019
- Dust-Flower-Flame, a documentary about the life of Tahirih Qurratul Ayn (as filmmaker and editor) France 2015. The film is screened in different cities in the world like Paris, New York, London, Washington DC, Berkeley, Stanford University, Toronto, Montreal, Arizona, UCLA University, Chicago, San Francisco, etc. and was broadcast by BBC Persian TV in March 2017
- Etre pionnier dans la foie Baháʼíe (as director and editor)
- Take one (BARDASHTE YEK)/(as director and editor)/ short web documentaries about the followers of Baháʼí faith in France 2011-2012

=== Film acting ===
- 1100 A SHORT FILM /Shabnam Tolouei

=== Radio programs in Persian language ===
- Podcasts for Aasoo Org since 2019
- Tasvir 2006-2007 for Payamedoost radio
- Beresad be daste to 2008/ Payamedoost radio
- Sahba and me (pavaraghihaye mano sahba) 2009/ Payamedoost radio
- Album 2012-2013 /Payamedoost Radio

=== Songs ===
- Dance! as singer, produced by Majid Kazemi
- A Girl, as singer, produced by Ares Band and Rasool Sadri
- Unripe Apple, as singer, actor and video director, music produced by Majid Kazemi, video produced by UnitedVoiceSE

=== Other presentations ===
Shabnam Tolouei holds live programs, interviewing specialists in the field of psychology and social sciences since 2019. She has been hosting official ceremonies in France and the US since 2015. She has her online acting workshop and weekly theater courses for Persian speaking students since 2021.
