= Aymeline Valade =

French model and actress (born 1984)

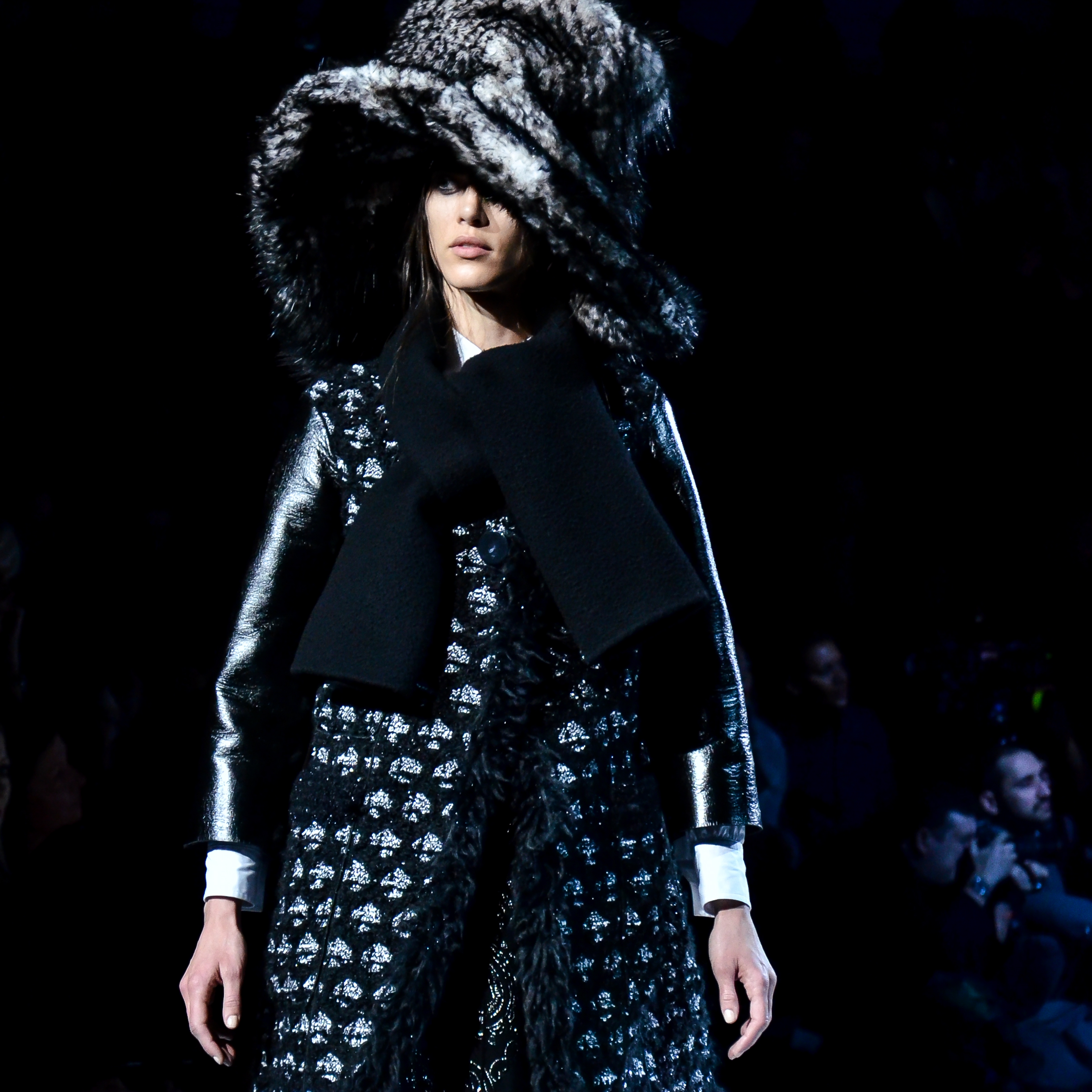
- Born: 17 October 1984 (age 41); Montpellier, Hérault, France
- Occupations: Model; Actress
- Years active: 2005–present
- Known for: Saint Laurent
- Modeling information
- Height: 178 cm (5 ft 10 in)
- Hair color: Light brown
- Eye color: Blue
- Agency: VIVA Model Management (Paris, London, Barcelona); Women Management (Milan); Mega Model Agency (Hamburg)

Aymeline Valade (born 17 October 1984) is a French supermodel and actress.

== Early life ==
Born in Montpellier, Valade grew up in Lyon, Paris and Nice. Valade learned to read at the age of 11 and learned how to skate. Valade was first noticed by an agent at 15 while skating in Nice. However, she decided not to try modeling and instead studied journalism and communication.

At age 22, she decided to go to Paris and started her career as a model. Her fashion debut was at Balenciaga Spring/Summer 2011.

== Career ==
As a model, Valade has participated in more than 200 fashion shows, including Chanel, Chloé, Dolce & Gabbana, Emilio Pucci, Louis Vuitton, Marc Jacobs, Marni and Versace.

In 2014, Valade played Betty Catroux in Saint Laurent.

In 2023, Valade became the face of Ferragamo's Holiday campaign.

== Filmography ==
Year	Title	Role	Director	Notes
2023	La Notte Viene Con Te	The Call-Girl	Leonardo De La Fuente	Short
2022	Aymeline	Herself	Noah Lee	Short
2017	Valerian and the City of a Thousand Planets	Emperor Haban-Limaï	Luc Besson	Emperor Haban-Limaï
2017	Call My Agent !	Herself	Antoine Garceau	TV series (1 episode)
2015	I Want Your Love	Herself	Nick Knight	Tom Ford promotional video with song music by Lady Gaga & Nile Rodgers
2015	Two Friends	La femme station-service	Louis Garrel	Cameo
2014	Saint Laurent	Betty Catroux	Bertrand Bonello	
2013	The Return	Herself	Karl Lagerfeld	Short
2006	Sous le soleil	Emilie	Alain Smitti	TV series (1 episode)
2005	Riviera	La fille jalouse	Anne Villacèque	Bit part
