= Yves Saint Laurent (film) =

2014 film by Jalil Lespert

- Theatrical release poster
- Directed by: Jalil Lespert
- Screenplay by: Marie-Pierre Huster; Jacques Fieschi; Jalil Lespert
- Based on: Yves Saint Laurent by Laurence Benaïm
- Produced by: Wassim Béji; Yannick Bolloré
- Starring: Pierre Niney; Guillaume Gallienne; Charlotte Le Bon; Laura Smet; Marie de Villepin; Nikolai Kinski; Ruben Alves; Astrid Whettnall; Marianne Basler; Adeline D'Hermy; Xavier Lafitte; Jean-Édouard Bodziak; Alexandre Steiger; Michèle Garcia; Olivier Pajot; Anne Alvaro
- Cinematography: Thomas Hardmeier
- Edited by: François Gédigier
- Music by: Ibrahim Maalouf
- Production companies: WY Productions; SND Films; Cinéfrance 1888; Hérodiade; uMedia
- Distributed by: SND Films
- Release date: 8 January 2014
- Running time: 105 minutes
- Country: France
- Languages: French; English; Russian; Arabic; Japanese
- Budget: €12 million
- Box office: $21 million

Yves Saint Laurent is a 2014 French biographical drama film directed by Jalil Lespert and co-written with Jacques Fieschi, Jérémie Guez, and Marie-Pierre Huster. The film is based on the life of Yves Saint Laurent from 1958. The film stars Pierre Niney, Guillaume Gallienne, Charlotte Le Bon, Laura Smet, Marie de Villepin, Xavier Lafitte, and Nikolai Kinski.

The film opened the Panorama Special section of the 64th Berlin International Film Festival at the renovated Zoo Palast, with director, cast, and Pierre Bergé in attendance. The film received seven nominations at the 40th César Awards, winning Best Actor for Pierre Niney.

== Premise ==
Yves Saint Laurent and Pierre Bergé promote the French fashion industry and stay friends against all odds.

== Cast ==
- Pierre Niney as Yves Saint Laurent
- Guillaume Gallienne as Pierre Bergé
- Charlotte Le Bon as Victoire Doutreleau
- Laura Smet as Loulou de la Falaise
- Marie de Villepin as Betty Catroux
- Nikolai Kinski as Karl Lagerfeld
- Xavier Lafitte as Jacques de Bascher
- Ruben Alves as Fernando Sánchez
- Marianne Basler as Lucienne Saint-Laurent
- Astrid Whettnall as Yvonne De Peyerimhoff
- Anne Alvaro as Marie-Louise Bousquet
- Michèle Garcia as Raymonde Zehnacker
- Patrice Thibaud as Christian Dior
- Adeline D'Hermy as Anne-Marie Munoz
- Alexandre Steiger as Jean-Pierre Debord
- Jean-Édouard Bodziak as Bernard Buffet
- Fabienne Chaudat as Dame Dior

== Production ==
In March 2013, The Weinstein Company acquired the rights to the film to distribute in the United States, while Entertainment One holds U.K., Australian and Benelux distribution rights, including Canadian distribution rights.

Lespert called Niney and over a drink a beer he told the actor, "I want to tell one of the most beautiful love stories and creation stories of our century. It’s the story of Yves Saint Laurent, I want you to play Yves Saint Laurent"; as Niney didn’t know about his character he undertook research and realised that "he was a really beautiful, complex, iconic and mysterious character". He added that the "character was too beautiful to be true, I didn’t want to miss anything. I knew I needed time to refine it, spend time in his skin before being on the set and, on the set, not doing imitation but being really free with the character". He had three coaches for five months, a stylist, someone to help with the sketches, and made a point of meeting Saint Laurent's best friends - in particular Betty Catroux, who helped in recounting everything "drugs, partying, sex" that happened behind closed doors.

Niney commented that he faced three challenges: that he had "to play a manic depressive", that he aged in the film "from around 18 to 46 years old" and lastly "not to lose the link between all the faces of the character. He is changing so much from the little boy at the beginning of the movie, then the hippies in the 70s with the long beard and the long hair and then older again".

Lespert chose to shoot using real locations and clothes – using dresses out of the cold rooms and museums and Saint Laurent's own real pen, draft, desk, and walking stick.

=== Filming ===
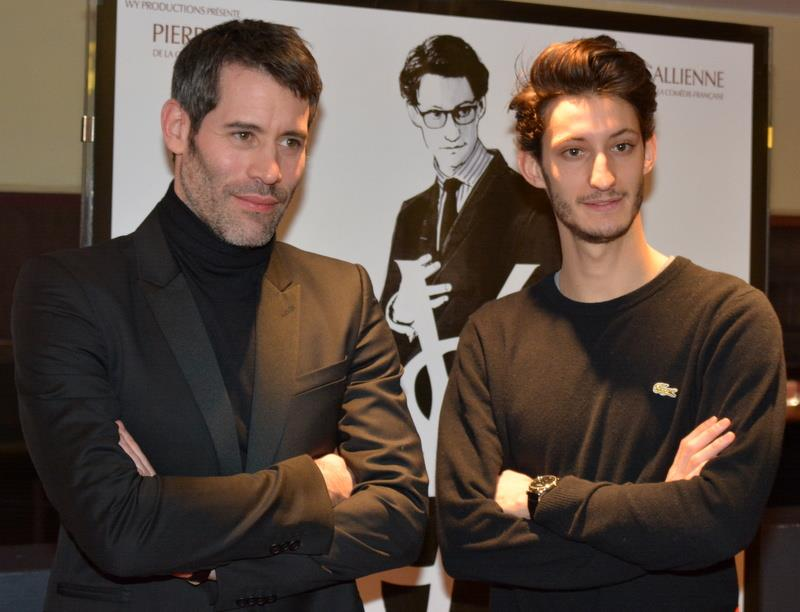
Director Jalil Lespert and lead actor Pierre Niney at the film's premiere in Paris

Principal photography began in June 2013. Part of the filming was done with Bergé, who sent "out models on the runway for a reconstitution of Saint Laurent's famous Opéra Ballets Russes collection of 1976, which was filmed at the fashions show's original venue, the Westin hotel (formerly known as the InterContinental.)" Bergé's foundation loaned the film "77 vintage outfits from its archives and allowed Lespert to film certain scenes at its headquarters on Avenue Marceau in Paris." Bergé "praised Lespert's film—based largely on a Laurence Benaïm biography of Saint Laurent and Bergé's reminiscences in his book Letters to Yves—for showing the designer's demons." Bergé said "...there are details I don't like, but that is of no importance whatsoever. You have to take the movie as it is—as a whole."

== Reception ==
Yves Saint Laurent received mixed reviews. On film aggregation website Rotten Tomatoes, it holds a rating of 45%, with an average score of 5.3/10, based on reviews from 65 critics. The site's consensus reads "While it boasts its share of fine performances, Yves Saint Laurent is also disappointingly bland and formulaic – especially given its subject's dazzling reputation." On another website, Metacritic, it has a score of 51/100 (indicating "mixed or average"), based on reviews from 25 critics.

Guy Lodge from Variety stated in 2014, "considerably less innovative than its human subject", "disappointingly by-the-numbers treatment" and "awkwardly structured".
