= Saint Laurent (film) =

2014 film by Bertrand Bonello

- Theatrical release poster
- Directed by: Bertrand Bonello
- Written by: Bertrand Bonello; Thomas Bidegain
- Produced by: Éric Altmayer; Nicolas Altmayer
- Starring: Gaspard Ulliel; Jérémie Renier; Louis Garrel; Léa Seydoux; Amira Casar; Aymeline Valade; Helmut Berger
- Cinematography: Josée Deshaies
- Edited by: Fabrice Rouaud
- Music by: Bertrand Bonello
- Production companies: Mandarin Cinéma; EuropaCorp; Orange Studio; Arte France Cinéma; Scope Pictures; Belgacom
- Distributed by: EuropaCorp Distribution
- Release dates: 17 May 2014 (Cannes); 24 September 2014 (France)
- Running time: 150 minutes
- Country: France
- Languages: French; English
- Budget: €8.7 million
- Box office: $2.4 million

Saint Laurent is a 2014 French biographical drama film co-written and directed by Bertrand Bonello, and starring Gaspard Ulliel as Yves Saint Laurent, Jérémie Renier as Pierre Bergé, and Louis Garrel as Jacques de Bascher. The supporting cast features Léa Seydoux, Amira Casar, Aymeline Valade, and Helmut Berger. The film centers on Saint Laurent's life from 1967 to 1976, during which time the famed fashion designer was at the peak of his career. The film competed for the Palme d'Or in the main competition section at the 2014 Cannes Film Festival and was released in France on 24 September 2014.

It was selected as the French entry for the Best Foreign Language Film at the 87th Academy Awards, but was not nominated. In January 2015, Saint Laurent received ten nominations at the 40th César Awards, including Best Film, Best Director, Best Actor, and Best Supporting Actor. It also received five nominations at the 20th Lumière Awards, winning Best Actor for Gaspard Ulliel.

== Plot ==
The film tells the story of fashion designer Yves Saint Laurent at the peak of his career between 1967 and 1976. The film starts with Saint Laurent alone and depressed in a hotel room apparently after a night of partying in Paris nightclubs. He is placing a call to a newspaper journalist to grant a tell-all interview which he had previously declined.

In the mid-1960s, Saint Laurent emerges as a leading voice in French fashion. His business begins to flourish and grow internationally. Less well known about his private life is his love of the Paris nightlife, and the clubs and homes of the rich and avant-garde. Saint Laurent enjoys the nightlife and the endless hours of champagne, pot, and drugs which seem to surround him at every turn. During one evening, he sees an attractive model, Betty Catroux, at a nightclub and approaches her about becoming a model for his fashion house. She turns him down saying that she is under contract with Chanel. Saint Laurent is persistent and keeps repeating his requests, while continuing to flatter her good looks. As the evening progresses, the two begin dancing together on the discotheque floor, and then start to mingle having drinks together. Later that week, Betty is seen in Saint Laurent's studio modeling his new designs for him while he creates his new fashions, and Saint Laurent celebrates having recruited one of Chanel's top model for his own fashion house.

Saint Laurent's success continues and he forms a long-term same-sex relationship with his business manager, Pierre Bergé, which is profitable to both men financially and in their personal emotional lives. Saint Laurent's use of alcohol and drugs seems to continue and to grow along with his international success as a fashion designer. On one night out of partying, a young male operative named Jacques de Bascher spies out Saint Laurent and approaches him with plainly presented romantic and sexual intentions. Saint Laurent is captivated by his good looks and the two begin an intensely explicit affair. Their preferred mutual habits of enjoying the Paris nightlife and drug use seem to spiral them out of control into a tumultuous relationship. Saint Laurent's long-term affair with Pierre at this fashion house in put on hold as Saint Laurent continues his new romantic affair with Jacques.

When Saint Laurent wakes up one morning in his hotel room, seemingly alone and dejected, he calls the newspaper journalist whom he had previously declined to interview with, and now present his own sensational tell-all version of his sexual proclivities and his penchant for the Paris nightlife. When his office and Pierre later learn that the newspaper is planning to proceed with the tell-all interview, they react harshly and threaten legal action for defamation and libel against the newspaper if they go ahead with publication. They state that the telephone interview was a prank by someone unknown to Saint Laurent and that printing the interview would only cause the newspaper embarrassment to their own reputation as journalists, as well as years in court defending themselves against a costly lawsuit for libel.

The film moves forward in time, showing Saint Laurent in old age living in his opulent Paris apartments surrounded by fine art and expensive fetishist possessions in his collection of exotic leopard skins and other wildlife shown on display throughout his flat. Saint Laurent dies in old age having become one of the most accomplished Paris fashion designers of the 20th century.

== Cast ==
- Gaspard Ulliel as Yves Saint Laurent
  - Helmut Berger as Yves Saint Laurent in 1989
- Jérémie Renier as Pierre Bergé
- Louis Garrel as Jacques de Bascher
- Léa Seydoux as Loulou de la Falaise
- Aymeline Valade as Betty Catroux
- Amira Casar as Anne-Marie Munoz
- Micha Lescot as Monsieur Jean-Pierre
- Valeria Bruni Tedeschi as Madame Duzer
- Jasmine Trinca as Talitha Getty
- Valérie Donzelli as Renée
- Dominique Sanda as Lucienne Saint Laurent
- Brady Corbet as David
- Bertrand Bonello as a Libération journalist
- Thomas Bidegain as a Libération journalist

== Production ==
Principal photography began on 30 September 2013 in Paris and Marrakesh.

== Release ==
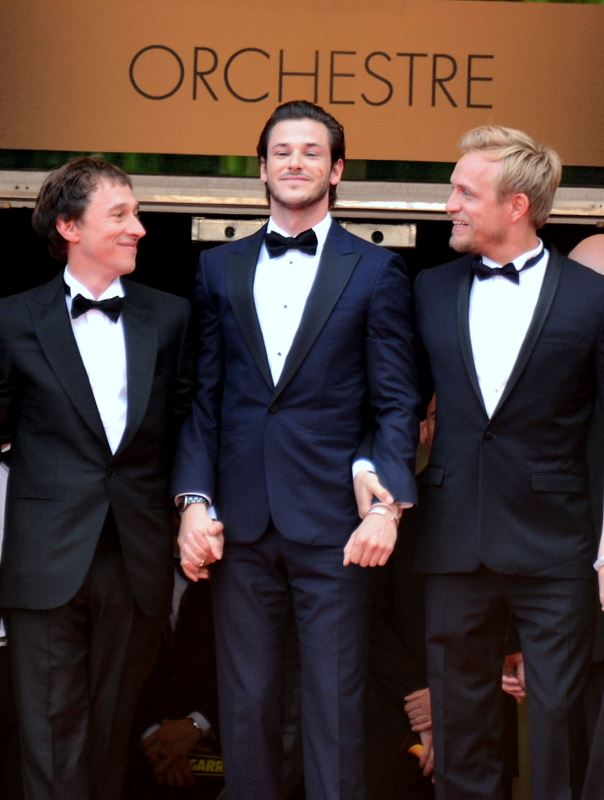
Bertrand Bonello, Gaspard Ulliel, and Jérémie Renier promoting the film at the 2014 Cannes Film Festival

The film was originally scheduled to be released in France on 14 May 2014. In January 2014, the release was pushed back to 1 October 2014. The release date was later changed to 24 September 2014.

In May 2014, Sony Pictures Classics acquired the North American rights at the 2014 Cannes Film Festival, where the film premiered in competition. The film was also screened at the 52nd New York Film Festival in September 2014.

In May 2015, the film opened in four theaters in New York City and Los Angeles to a $36,136 opening weekend.

== Reception ==
=== Critical response ===
On the review aggregator website Rotten Tomatoes, the film holds an approval rating of 63% based on 86 reviews, with an average rating of 5.9/10. The website's critics consensus reads, "A well-intentioned but frustratingly diffuse biopic, Saint Laurent proves an ironically poor fit for a look at the life of a fashion icon." Metacritic, which uses a weighted average, assigned the film a score of 52 out of 100, based on 29 critics, indicating "mixed or average" reviews.

Susan Wloszczyna of RogerEbert.com gave the film 2.5 out of 4 stars, writing, "If you come away remembering anything from this 150-minute movie as it overstays its welcome, it will be individual scenes rather than the overall effect, for that is where Bonello shines." A. O. Scott of The New York Times described it as "a compulsively detailed swirl of moods and impressions, intent on capturing the contradictions of the man and his times."

=== Accolades ===
Award	Category	Recipient(s)	Result	Ref(s)
Cannes Film Festival	Palme d'Or	Saint Laurent	Nominated	
César Awards	Best Film	Saint Laurent	Nominated	
César Awards	Best Director	Bertrand Bonello	Nominated	
César Awards	Best Actor	Gaspard Ulliel	Nominated	
César Awards	Best Supporting Actor	Louis Garrel	Nominated	
César Awards	Best Supporting Actor	Jérémie Renier	Nominated	
César Awards	Best Production Design	Katia Wyszkop	Nominated	
César Awards	Best Sound	Nicolas Cantin, Nicolas Moreau, Jean-Pierre Laforce	Nominated	
César Awards	Best Cinematography	Josée Deshaies	Nominated	
César Awards	Best Editing	Fabrice Rouaud	Nominated	
César Awards	Best Costume Design	Anaïs Romand	Won	
Globes de Cristal Award	Best Actor	Gaspard Ulliel	Nominated	
Louis Delluc Prize	Best Film	Saint Laurent	Nominated	
Lumière Awards	Best Film	Saint Laurent	Nominated	
Lumière Awards	Best Director	Bertrand Bonello	Nominated	
Lumière Awards	Best Actor	Gaspard Ulliel	Won	
Lumière Awards	Best Screenplay	Thomas Bidegain and Bertrand Bonello	Nominated	
Lumière Awards	Best Cinematography	Josée Deshaies	Nominated	
Magritte Awards	Best Supporting Actor	Jérémie Renier	Won	
Satellite Awards	Best Costume Design	Anaïs Romand	Nominated	
International Cinephile Society Awards	Best Actor	Gaspard Ulliel	Won	
International Cinephile Society Awards	Best Supporting Actor	Helmut Berger	Nominated	
International Cinephile Society Awards	Best Production Design	Katia Wyszkop	Nominated	

== See also ==
- List of submissions to the 87th Academy Awards for Best Foreign Language Film
- List of French submissions for the Academy Award for Best Foreign Language Film
