= Yves Saint Laurent (designer) =

French fashion designer (1936–2008)

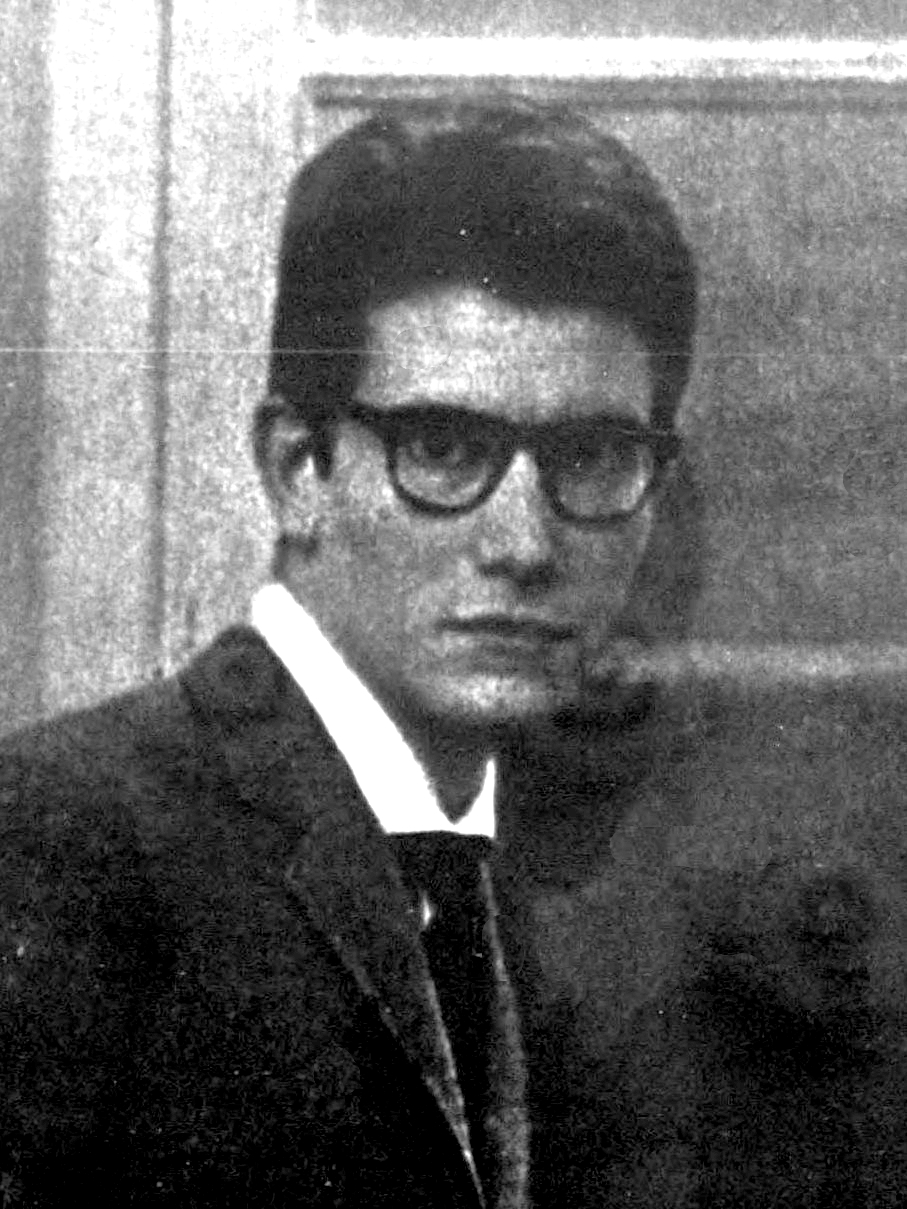
- Saint Laurent in 1961
- Born: 1 August 1936; Oran, Algeria
- Died: 1 June 2008 (aged 71); Paris, France
- Resting place: Jardin Majorelle, Marrakesh, Morocco
- Education: École de la chambre syndicale de la couture parisienne
- Known for: Fashion design
- Partner: Pierre Bergé
- Awards: Grand officier de la Légion d'honneur 2007; CFDA International Fashion Award 1982; Oscar de la mode 1985; CFDA Geoffrey Beene Lifetime Achievement Award 1999

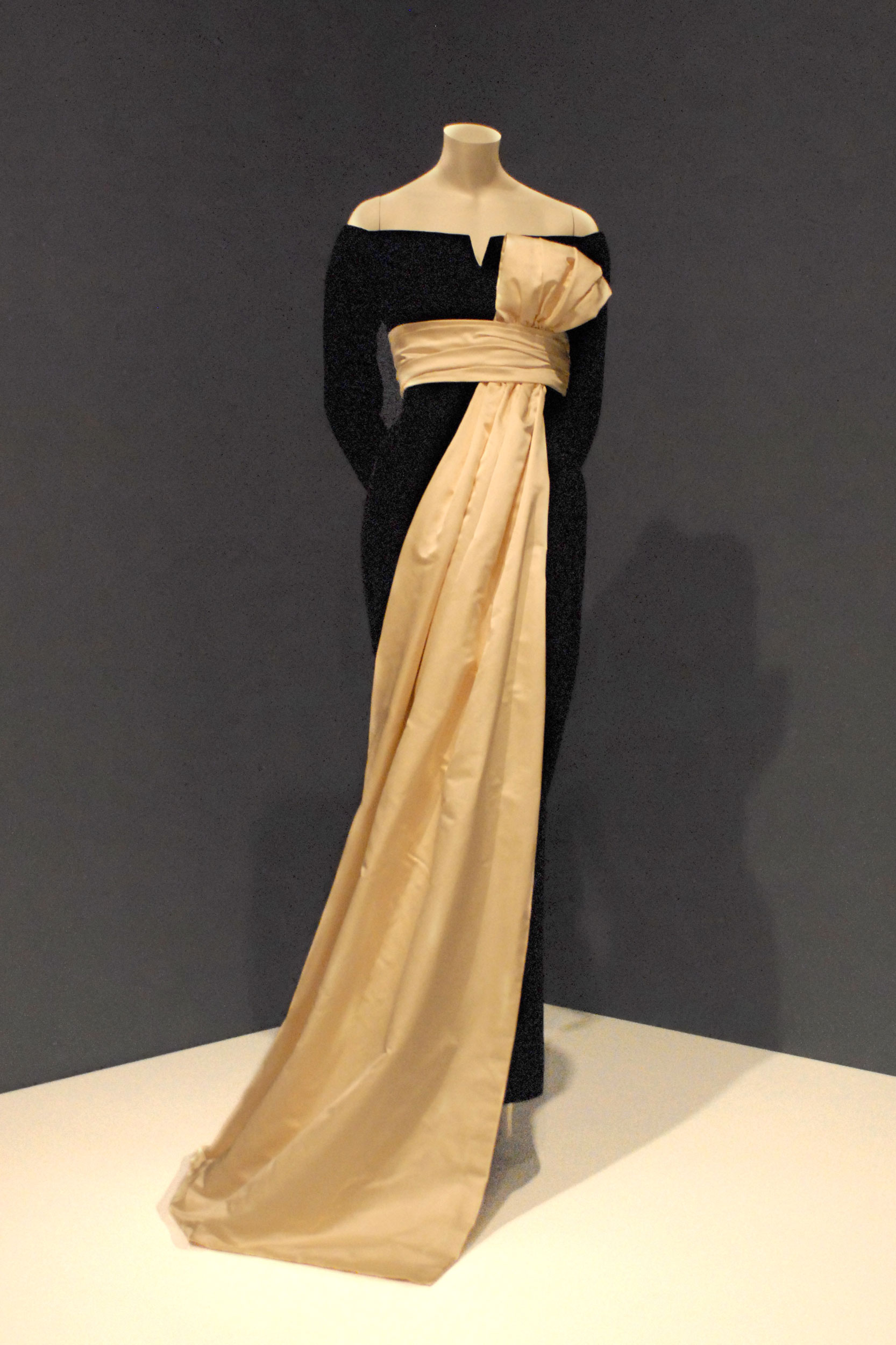
Saint Laurent's First Gown for Christian Dior, 1956

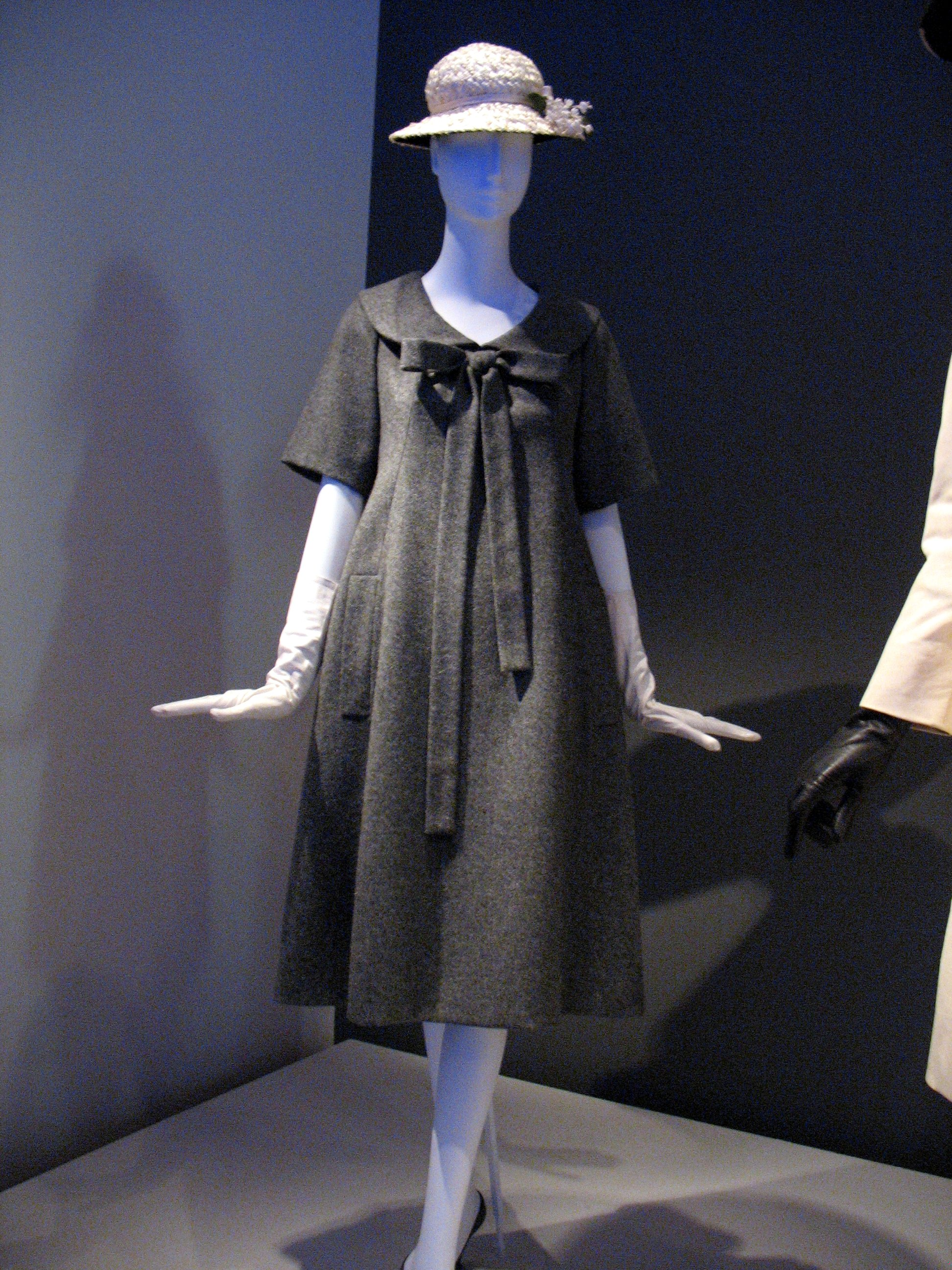
The Trapeze Dress, 1958

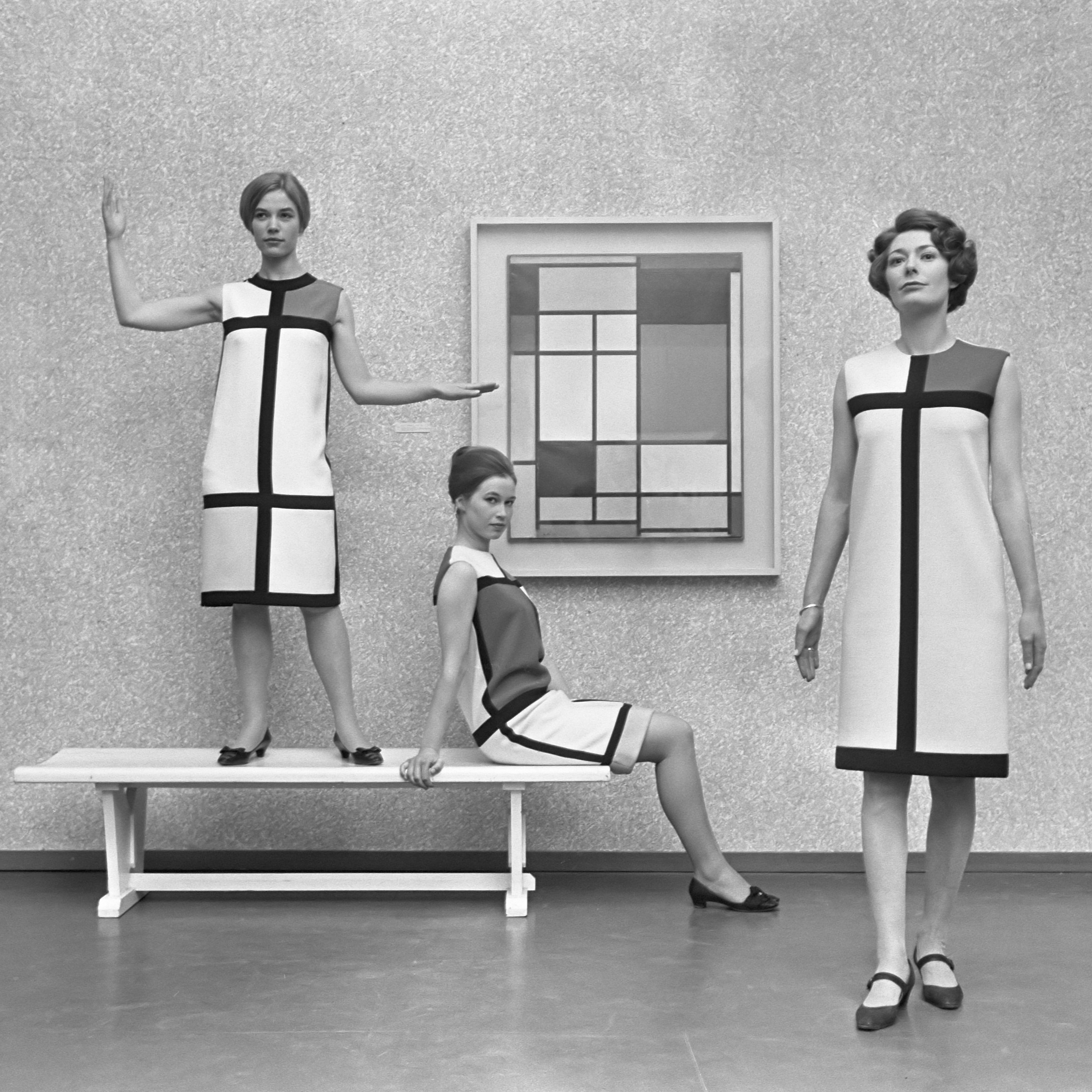
1965 Mondrian dresses

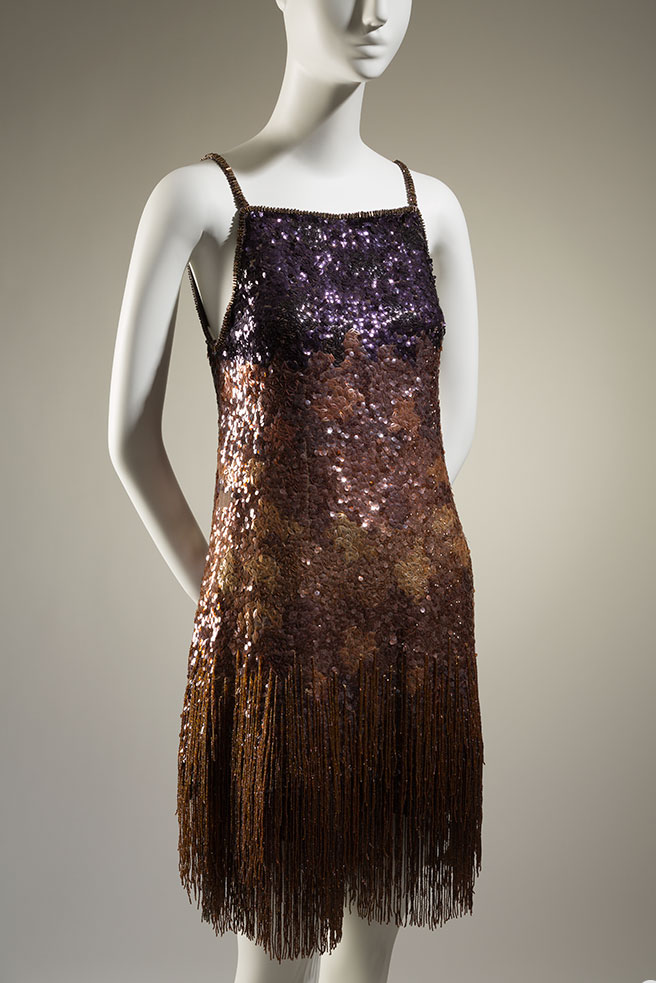
1969 Beaded Evening Dress

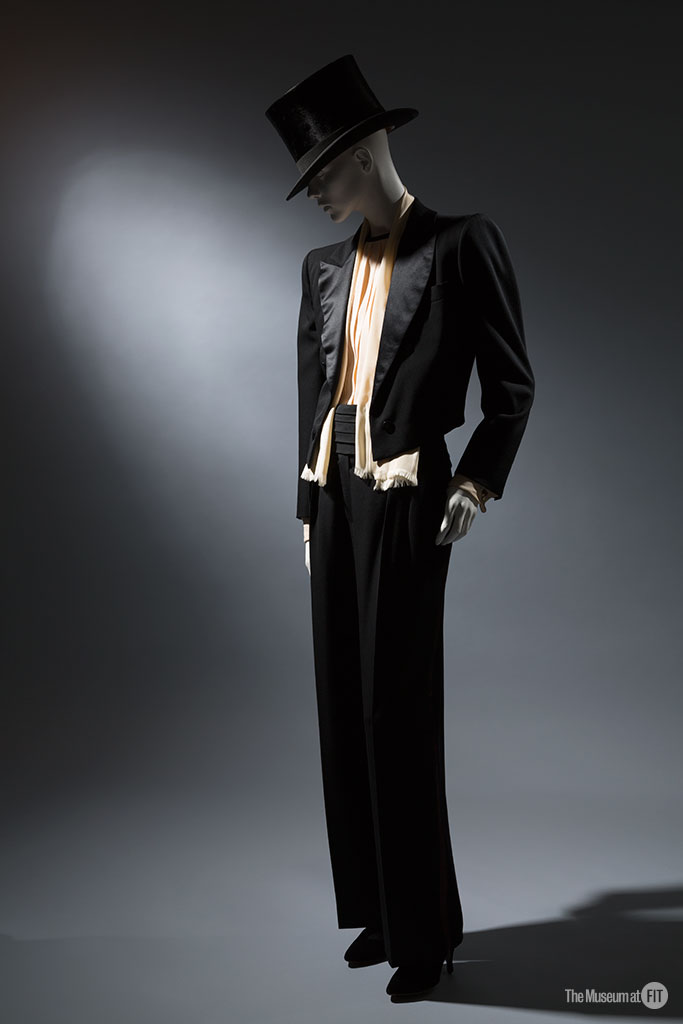
"Le Smoking" Tuxedo 1966, from the estate of Tina Chow

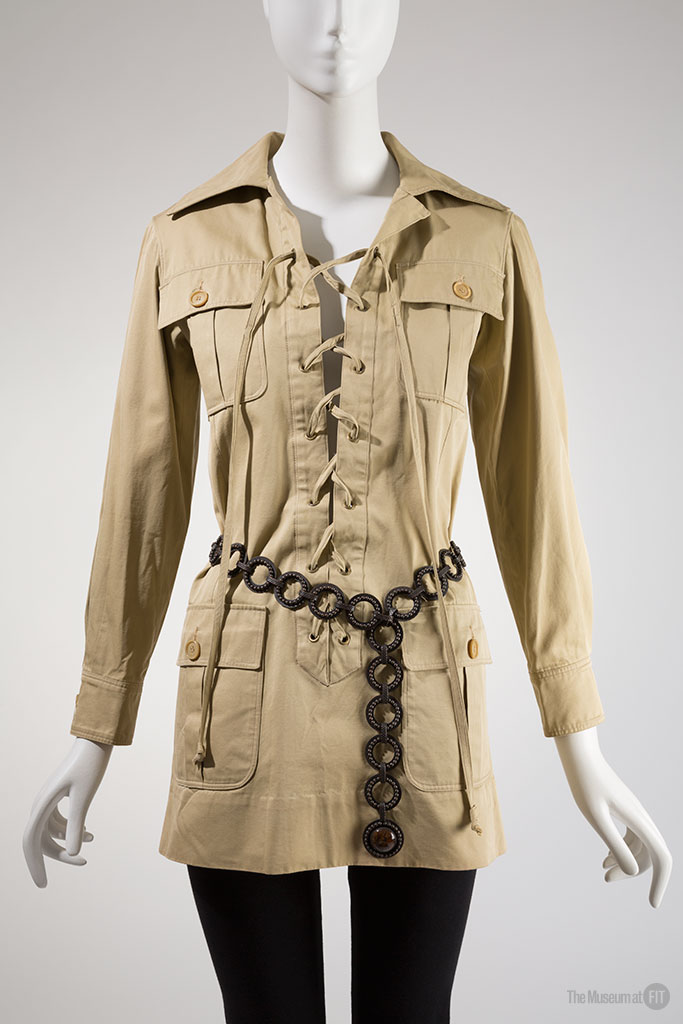
1968 "Safari" Jacket

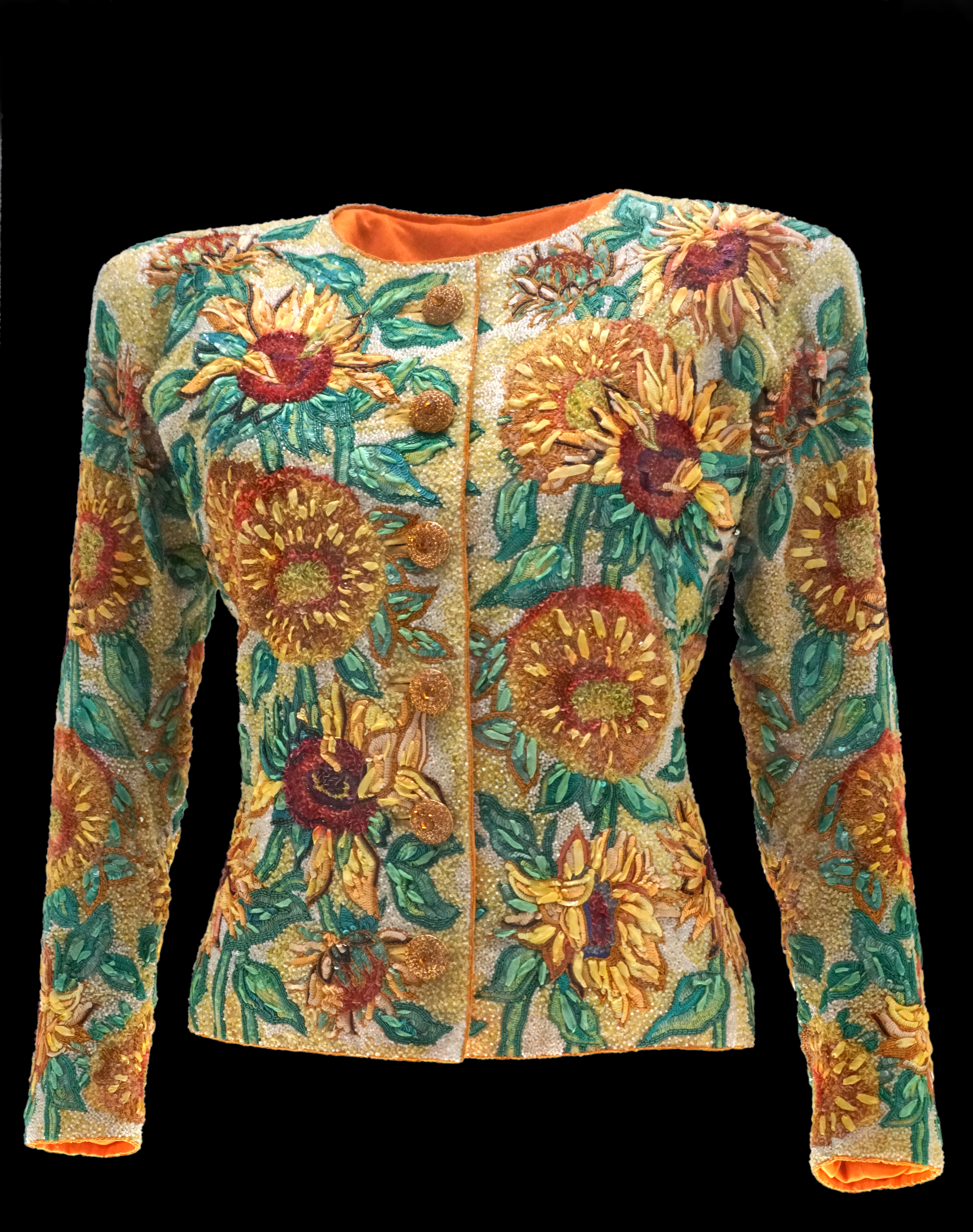
1988 "Homage to Vincent Van Gogh" jacket, embroidered by Lesage

Yves Henri Donat Mathieu-Saint-Laurent (1 August 1936 – 1 June 2008), better known as Yves Saint Laurent (/ˌiːv ˌsæ̃ lɔːˈrɒ̃/, also UK: /- lɒ-/, US: /- loʊ-/; French: [iv sɛ̃ lɔʁɑ̃]), was a French fashion designer who founded his eponymous fashion label in 1962. He was the last of the grand couturiers and is regarded as one of the foremost designers of the 20th century.

Saint Laurent received numerous distinctions for his work, including the International Fashion Award from the Council of Fashion Designers of America in 1982. In 1983, he became the first living fashion designer to be honored with a solo exhibition at the Metropolitan Museum of Art. In 2007, he was elevated to the rank of Grand officier de la Légion d'honneur.

== Early life and education ==
Yves Henri Donat Mathieu-Saint-Laurent was born on 1 August 1936, in Oran, Algeria, the eldest of three children of French (Pieds-Noirs) parents, Charles and Lucienne Andrée Mathieu-Saint-Laurent. His family was wealthy; Charles ran an insurance company and owned a chain of movie theatres. Yves grew up, with his sisters Michèle and Brigitte, in a villa in town, spending summers at the nearby resort of Trouville. He attended a strict Catholic school, where he was bullied and beaten by classmates for being effeminate. After seeing a play for which Christian Bérard had designed the sets and costumes, he began doing the same, creating miniature theaters and designing costumes for the local dance school. By age 13, he was transcribing and illustrating books; in 1949 and 1950, he wrote two children's books. He had always been preoccupied with fashion; as early as age three, he would become upset if he didn't like what his mother was wearing. In 1953 and 1954, inspired by fashion magazines and the models Bettina Graziani and Suzy Parker, he created 11 paper dolls and 500 garments and accessories for them.

In 1953, age 17, Saint Laurent submitted three sketches to a contest for young fashion designers organized by the International Wool Secretariat in Paris; he won third prize in the dress category. The following year, he competed again and won first prize. He met Vogue France editor Michel de Brunhoff, who encouraged him to enroll at École de la chambre syndicale de la couture parisienne. In 1955, he graduated at the top of his class. de Brunhoff looked at his sketches and saw that they were very similar to those of Christian Dior, but he knew that they were original. He arranged for Dior and Saint Laurent to meet on June 20, 1955; Dior hired him on the spot.

== Career ==
=== The House of Dior (1955–1960) ===
Saint Laurent spent his first year at the House of Dior designing accessories and submitting sketches, with Dior accepting an increasing number. "Dior fascinated me," Saint Laurent later recalled. "I couldn't speak in front of him. He taught me the basis of my art. Whatever was to happen next, I never forgot the years I spent at his side."

With the death of Dior in 1957, Saint Laurent, at age 21, became the head designer of the House of Dior, the most influential and profitable fashion house in the world. The simple, flaring lines of his first collection for Dior, called the "Trapeze" line, introduced a wedge-shaped silhouette, which was a variation on Dior's A line. Dresses in the collection featured a narrow shoulder that flared gently to a hem, widening from a small head and shoulders to a full pleated or stiffened hem that just covered the knee. In his second collection for Dior, presented for fall 1958, Saint Laurent lowered hemlines by three to five inches, which some critics and buyers considered a major misstep. Soon after, Marc Bohan was hired to assist Saint Laurent, and the spring 1959 Dior collection brought lengths back to the knee in a well-received collection inspired by the 1930s, noted for its suits and sailor collars, and for making the common middy blouse high-fashion. Following the critical success of his debut "Trapeze" collection in 1958, Saint Laurent achieved widespread celebrity as a leading representative of a new post-war cultural generation. That same year, The New York Times designated him one of France's "Fabulous Five" young cultural icons alongside couturier peers and artists, grouping him with painter Bernard Buffet, novelist Françoise Sagan, actress Brigitte Bardot, and filmmaker Roger Vadim.

Saint Laurent's fall 1959 collection focused on a skirt shape that bloused, or "pouffed", over a narrow band to hit at mid-knee for day wear and flared below the knee to the floor for evening dresses. At least one skirt of similar shape had appeared at Dior for fall of 1955, and skirts of this form had been shown by Simonetta in 1957 and 1958, but Saint Laurent's versions were criticized for being too short and too restrictive, and were called "hobble" skirts. The silhouette fit trends of the time, also conveyed by Simonetta and Patrick de Barentzen, which included very high collars, jeweled chokers, India-inspired evening wear and 12-inch chignons. Saint Laurent's spring 1960 Dior collection was more sedate, with tailored suits of full smocks over narrow skirts. His fall 1960 collection was his most controversial; dresses were narrow waistless columns with balloon skirts that ended at the top of the knee, which was scandalously short for the time. The inspiration for this look was the bohemian dress of young intellectuals and artists; other garments were inspired by bikers' black leather jackets, remade in mink-trimmed glossy crocodile, with velvet palazzo pants. This Rive Gauche 'Beat Look' included black leather suits and coats, knitted caps and high turtleneck collars, all inappropriate for the mature haute couture client. Saint Laurent failed to court buyers and press and the collection was his last for Dior.

In August 1960, during the Algerian War, Saint Laurent was called for his compulsory military service. He was in the ranks for 19 days before the stress of hazing by fellow soldiers led to him being admitted to a military hospital. There he received news that he had been fired from Dior and replaced by Marc Bohan. This exacerbated Saint Laurent's nervous condition, and he was transferred to Val-de-Grâce military hospital, where he was given psychoactive drugs and subjected to electroshock therapy; he would later trace this as the beginning of his mental problems and addictions. His lover, the art dealer Pierre Bergé, arranged for his release and took him home to recover. Saint Laurent sued Dior for breach of contract and won the equivalent of $135,000. US. With that, and an investment from the American businessman J. Mack Robinson and the cosmetics company Charles of the Ritz, among others, the pair was able to establish Saint Laurent's own house, Yves Saint Laurent, or YSL.

=== The YSL years ===
While Bergé, as YSL General Director, dealt with a law suit from Dior over the fact that 25 senior Dior staff had left to join YSL, Saint Laurent worked on his spring 1962 collection which was presented at the new atelier at 30 bis rue Spontini. This collection, of crisp, youthful garments, included pea coats, tweed suits in unusual color combinations, pear-shaped draped skirts, and the lingerie-inspired "brassière dress". Everything was wearable and elegant and the collection was snapped up by buyers. Saint Laurent's second collection, for fall 1962, was celebrated as his best to date. It featured India-inspired evening dress in rich, mink-trimmed satin and a mostly dark, rich color palette. Raja coats and pull-over tubular dresses or barrel skirts, and wide-sleeved satin fishermen's smocks, were paired with turbans and dark stockings and elaborate jewellery. Fashion writers ranked the collection with those of Givenchy and Balenciaga; Saint Laurent was now at the pinnacle of Paris couture.

In the 1960s, Saint Laurent introduced or contributed to fashion trends such as the beatnik look (1962), pea coats (1962), smock tops (1962-63), thigh-high boots (1963, via his chosen shoe designer Roger Vivier), the Le Smoking women's tuxedo suit (1966), platform shoes (1967, courtesy of Roger Vivier), and safari jackets for men and women (1967).

Throughout the 1960s, Saint Laurent followed the international youth culture taking shape, a tendency already evident in his fall 1960 Dior collection. Like designers and others of the period, he kept an eye on the pace-setting streets of London and also on the hippie movement emanating from the US. He responded to the spare precision of André Courrèges's groundbreaking 1964 and '65 Space Age designs with the now-famous stark, geometric shift dresses of his 1965 Mondrian collection but faltered a bit with the slightly passé Pop Art dresses in his autumn 1966 line.

In September 1966, Saint Laurent presented a full prêt-à-porter (ready-to-wear) line; after Dior's massive success with ready-to-wear in the late 1940s, all fashion houses followed. This line was presented at YSL's first Rive Gauche boutique at 21 rue de Tournon. An early customer was Catherine Deneuve, for whom Saint Laurent later designed costumes in films including Belle de Jour (1967), Heartbeat (1968), and Mississippi Mermaid (1969).

The revolutionary societal movements of the time transformed Saint Laurent's thinking and he began to base his work more on what women were actually wearing than on abstract ideas in his head. A number of his designs were inspired by women's lives in the sociopolitical climate of the time, particularly the trousers he showed in 1968 after witnessing the epochal French uprisings of that year. Saint Laurent is often said to have been the main designer responsible for making women wearing pants more widely acceptable, after André Courrèges made the first strides in that direction in 1964.

Also more acceptable in the late 1960s was nudity. Saint Laurent had initially been appalled at Rudi Gernreich's topless swimsuits of 1964, but in 1966 he showed A-line minidresses of transparent fabric separated by strategically placed horizontal bands of Space Age silver sequins. By 1968, he was showing fully transparent tops as nudity became more common in high fashion and on stage and screen, and sheer blouses would remain a mainstay of his showings for the next ten years, diminishing to only one or two presented in each collection after the vogue for nudity waned by the mid-1970s.

The social transformations of the late 1960s also influenced how Saint Laurent himself dressed, as he wore more relaxed clothes reflecting the era's youth movements and let his hair grow. His new personal wardrobe led to him presenting his first men's ready-to-wear collection in 1969.

In September 1968, Saint Laurent opened the first Rive Gauche store in the United States on Madison Avenue in Manhattan. While in New York, he attended the exhibition of his costume sketches for ballet and theatrical productions at the Wright Hepburn Webster Gallery. During this trip Saint Laurent and his entourage were denied entry to Trader Vic's restaurant because the women were wearing pants.

In 1971, he posed for a natural-looking nude photograph as part of the advertising campaign for his Pour Homme men's fragrance.

During the 1970s, Saint Laurent came to be considered the most prominent designer in the world, adapting his designs to modern women's needs. Though Karl Lagerfeld and Jean Muir occasionally approached him in critical appraisal and popularity, Saint Laurent remained the strongest influence on fashion throughout the decade, an era when the societal advances of the 1960s required designers to defer to the public's demands for practicality and comfort. Even in his sometimes lavish Russian peasant collections of the middle of the decade, the clothes themselves remained comfortable and wearable.

His controversial spring 1971 collection was inspired by 1940s fashion. Some felt it romanticized the German occupation of France during World War II, which he did not experience, while others felt it brought back the unattractive utilitarianism of the time. The French newspaper France Soir called the spring 1971 collection "Une grande farce!"

His spring 1971 couture collection marked other changes. Now that the liberatory trends of the 1960s and early '70s had become established, with women released from constricting undergarments and free to wear trousers in all settings and men also free to be more casual in their dress, advances aided in no small part by Saint Laurent, he shed some of the less appealing aspects of the youth culture of that period, particularly after losing a couple of young friends to the drug experimentation of the time. While still exhibiting the pervasive relaxed, casual look, by 1972, he had begun to cut his hair and shave again and discarded the well-worn jeans and shoelessness.

Saint Laurent had nurtured his ready-to-wear to the extent that it now eclipsed the haute couture in prominence. In 1971, amidst heavy criticism of his 1940s-themed collection, he threatened to end his couture services entirely. Instead, Saint Laurent and a few others declared in early 1972 that they would now show their couture pieces with their prêt-á-porter, but soon Saint Laurent began to worry publicly that the craftsmanship of the couture might be lost, as well as the livelihoods of those who depended on him, and he decided to carry on holding separate couture presentations.

While the prêt-à-porter line became extremely popular with the public and eventually earned many times more for Saint Laurent and Bergé than the haute couture line, Saint Laurent's decision to continue producing haute couture lines resulted in some landmark collections as well during the 1970s, most famously the fall 1976 Russian Peasant collection, which brought the popular peasant silhouette of the time to a peak of exotic luxury, but also his spring 1978 Broadway Suit presentation, which inspired the fashion industry to move toward wide, padded shoulders. However, Saint Laurent, whose health had been precarious for years, became erratic under the pressure of designing two haute couture and two prêt-à-porter collections every year.

In 1976, Saint Laurent and Bergé ended their romantic relationship but remained business partners. Saint Laurent increasingly turned to alcohol and drugs. At some shows, he could barely walk down the runway at the end of the show, and he had to be supported by models.

Saint Laurent is credited with initiating in 1978 the prominently shoulder-padded styles that would characterize the 1980s. He then relied on a restricted set of looks based largely on big-shouldered jackets and narrow skirts and trousers that wouldn't vary much for a decade, resulting in some fashion writers bemoaning the loss of his former inventiveness and others welcoming the familiarity. Where in the 1960s and '70s his work had reflected the democratizing trends of the time, during the 1980s his work conformed more to the tastes of the wealthy as social inequality increased in society. His broad-shouldered wardrobe basics now seemed geared more to the ladies-who-lunch set than the liberated, casual young women he had been inspired by in the earlier 1970s, and his work was now often grouped with that of Givenchy, Valentino, Oscar de la Renta, and similar designers. He was noted in the early 1980s for his short, slim, sleek black leather skirts, with versions in metallic gold leather receiving raves from socialites in 1981. After helping bring ready-to-wear to mass acceptance earlier in his career and nearly abandoning haute couture in the early 1970s, during the 1980s, with the nouveaux riches in ascendance and demanding showpieces, he refocused on his couture lines, to the extent that observers felt that his prêt-á-porter was being neglected. He was one of the last designers to give up big shoulder pads at the end of the eighties.

After a show in New York City, which featured US$100,000 jeweled casual jackets only days after the "Black Monday" stock market crash in 1987, he turned over the responsibility of the prêt-à-porter line to his assistants. In 1993, the Yves Saint Laurent business was sold to Sanofi. He became increasingly reclusive, but continued to design the couture collection until he retired 2002.

=== Muses ===
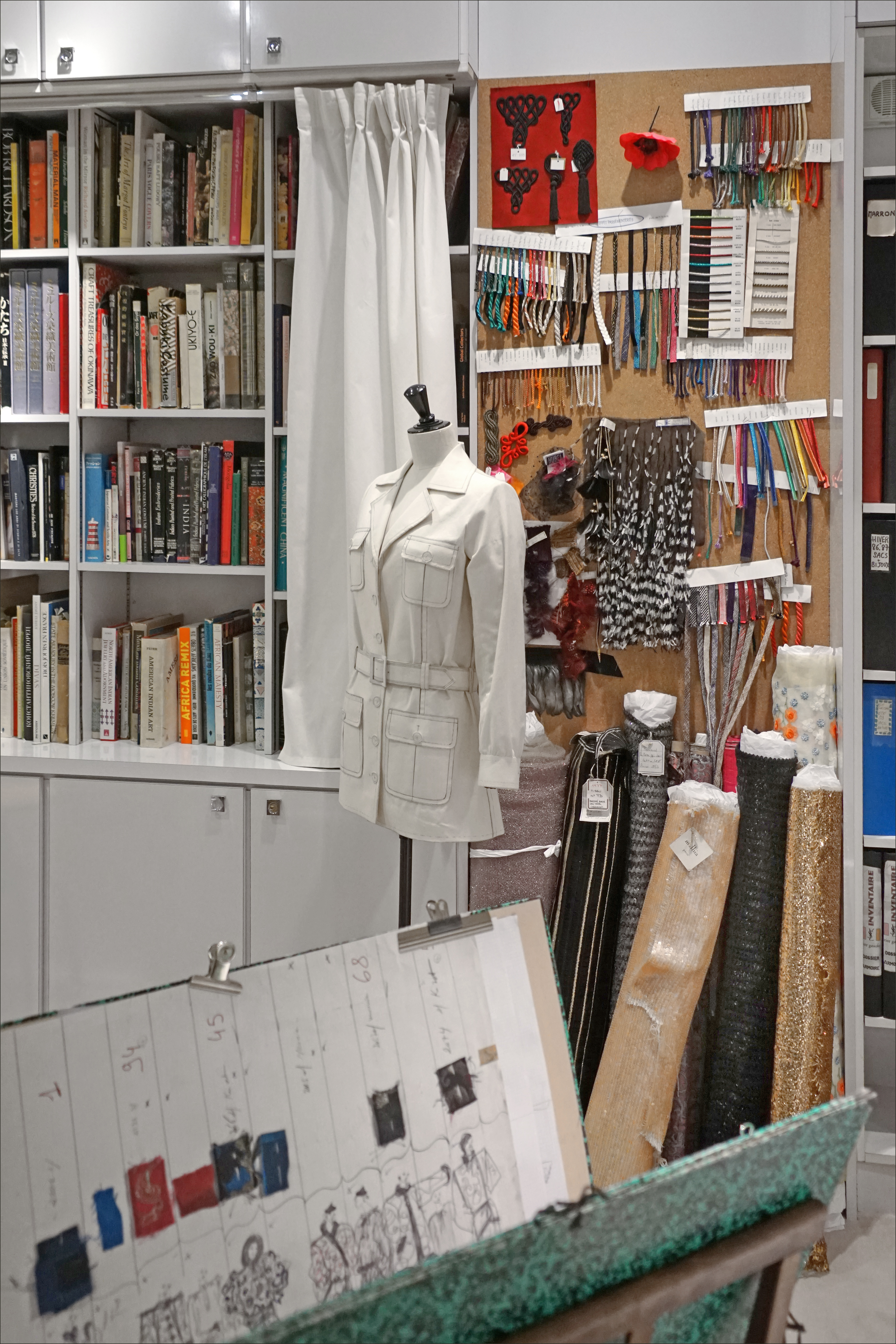
Saint Laurent's studio, with a toile for a Safari jacket

A favorite among his female clientele, Saint Laurent had a number of muses who inspired his work. Among them were French model Victoire Doutreleau, who opened his first fashion show in 1962; Loulou de la Falaise, daughter of a French marquis and an Anglo-Irish model, who later became a jewelry designer for the brand; Betty Catroux, the half-Brazilian daughter of an American diplomat, whom Saint Laurent considered his "twin sister"; and Italian model Marina Schiano, who later managed YSL boutiques in North America.

Other notable muses included French actress Catherine Deneuve; French model Danielle Luquet de Saint Germain, and American-French artist Niki de Saint Phalle, both of whom inspired the Le Smoking suit; and Warhol superstar Donna Jordan, who inspired his spring 1971 collection.

He also worked closely with Mounia, a model from Martinique who frequently appeared as the bride in his fashion shows; Kenyan model Khadija Adam Ismail; Lucie de la Falaise, a Welsh-French model and niece of Loulou, who served as the bride in his shows from 1990 to 1994; and French model Laetitia Casta, who assumed the same role from 1998 to 2001.

Additional muses included jewelry designer Paloma Picasso; Dutch actress Talitha Getty; American socialite Nan Kempner, who was later named an ambassador for the brand; and French model Nicole Dorier, who became director of his runway shows and later served as the "memory" of the house when it became a museum.

== Death ==
Saint Laurent died on 1 June 2008 of brain cancer at his residence in Paris. According to The New York Times, a few days prior, he and Bergé had been joined in a Civil union known as a Pacte civil de solidarité (PACS) in France. When Saint Laurent was diagnosed as terminal, with only one or two weeks left to live, Bergé and the doctor mutually decided that it would be better for him not to know of his impending death. Bergé said, "I have the belief that Yves would not have been strong enough to accept that."

He was given a Catholic funeral at Église Saint-Roch in Paris. The funeral attendees included the former Empress of Iran Farah Pahlavi, Bernadette Chirac, Catherine Deneuve, and President Nicolas Sarkozy and his wife, Carla Bruni.

His body was cremated, and his ashes were scattered in Marrakesh, Morocco, in the Majorelle Garden, a residence and botanical garden that he owned with Bergé and often visited to find inspiration and refuge. Bergé said at the funeral service (in French): "But I also know that I will never forget what I owe you and that one day I will join you under the Moroccan palms."

== Personal life ==
Saint Laurent met Pierre Bergé at dinner with Marie-Louise Bousquet in 1958. They soon became a couple, and together they co-founded the Yves Saint Laurent Couture House in 1961. They remained close friends and business partners after their amicable breakup in 1976.

Chilean heiress Clara Saint became a key figure within Saint Laurent's close social circle in the mid-1960s. She initially formed a friendship with Saint Laurent and Pierre Bergé and, in 1968, became press officer for the Rive Gauche ready-to-wear line. Saint is credited with introducing them to Russian ballet dancer Rudolf Nureyev, her then-boyfriend Thadée Klossowski de Rola, and French designer Paloma Picasso, thereby expanding their social network. She also played a pivotal role in shaping Saint Laurent's personal life, notably suggesting Marrakech as a holiday destination. The trip proved deeply significant for the designer, reconnecting him with the sensory impressions of his childhood in North Africa.

In 1967, Éditions Tchou published a book by Saint Laurent, La Vilaine Lulu (The Villain Lulu), a collection of comic strips featuring a cruelly mischievous little girl named Lulu whom the designer had been sketching since 1956, when he had been inspired by a costume worn by one of Dior's colleagues. The child engages in pranks ranging from abusing hospital patients to defiling André Courrèges's pristine white salon with black paint.

While in New York for the opening of the Rive Gauche boutique in 1968, Saint Laurent began a friendship with American Pop artist Andy Warhol. When Warhol visited him in Marrakech for Easter in 1972, Saint Laurent commissioned a portrait, and Warhol later traveled to Paris to photograph him for the work. During a visit to New York in November 1972, Saint Laurent saw the portrait and remarked, "The colors are marvelous — orange, red, green, and pink." In February 1974, he hosted a party in honor of Warhol to celebrate the artist's solo exhibitions at the Musée Galliera and Galerie Ileana Sonnabend in Paris. Warhol's partner, Jed Johnson, later decorated Bergé's New York pied-à-terre at The Pierre in 1978 and designed the Yves Saint Laurent Enterprises offices in New York in 1979.

In 1973, Saint Laurent began a six-month affair with Karl Lagerfeld's companion Jacques de Bascher. Bergé ended their liaison in 1974, accusing de Bascher and Lagerfeld of being responsible for Saint Laurent's mental health issues and his increasing interest in hard drugs and sadomasochism.

Saint Laurent was considered one of Paris's "jet set," moving within an international circle of celebrities and cultural figures. He frequently socialized at prominent nightclubs in France and New York City, including Club Sept, Regine's, Studio 54, and Le Palace, and was known for a lifestyle marked by heavy drinking and regular cocaine use.

Saint Laurent had a lifelong affection for dogs. "I am, as they say, a 'dog' person," he once remarked. Over the years, he kept a chihuahua named Hazel and a succession of French Bulldogs, each named Moujik, which became enduring fixtures in his life and work.

=== Homes ===
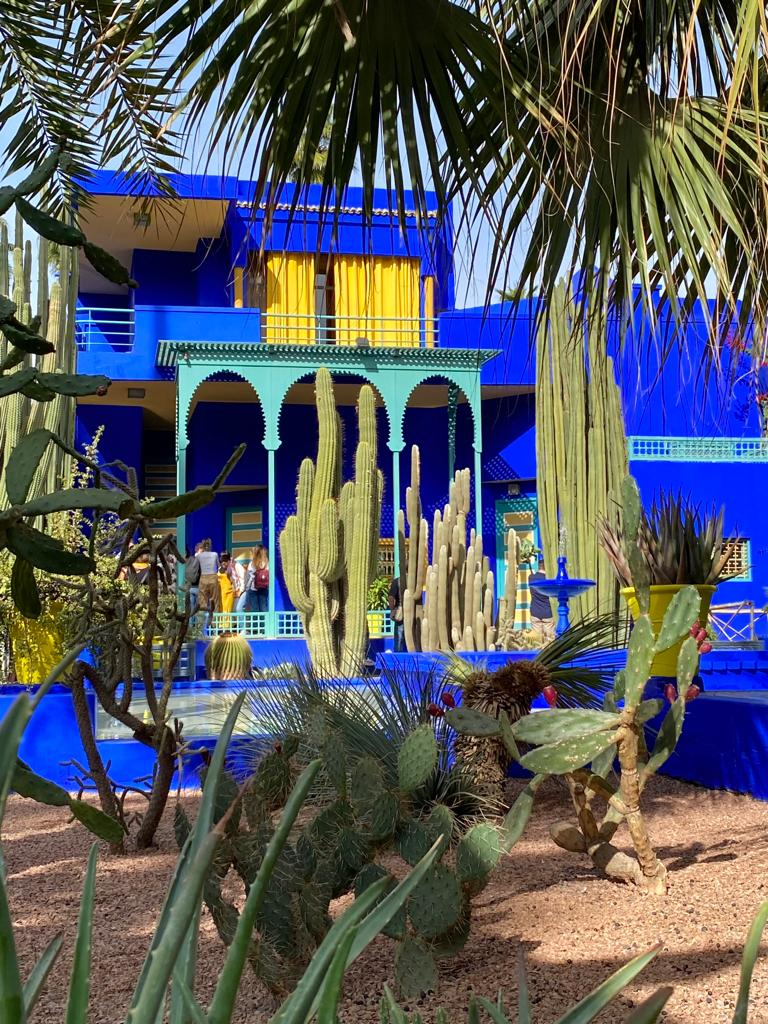
Majorelle Garden in Marrakesh

The duplex at 55 Rue de Babylone on the Left Bank of Paris, which Saint Laurent and Bergé purchased in 1970, was highlighted in the May 1972 issue of British Vogue. French architect Jean-Michel Frank designed the apartment's interior in the 1920s in the Art Deco style. Saint Laurent hired French interior designer Jacques Grange to decorate the apartment, which featured vases by Jean Dunand, stools by Pierre Legrain, a red lacquer-framed stool by Gustave Miklos, an armchair by Eileen Gray, and sheep chairs by Claude and François-Xavier Lalanne. Saint Laurent was so pleased with Grange’s work that he subsequently entrusted him with the decoration of all his homes.

Saint Laurent and Bergé made their first trip to Marrakech in 1966, which marked the start of a lifelong passion for Moroccan culture. Saint Laurent once stated, "Everything was black before Marrakech." "I learned color from this city, and I embraced its light, its bold blends, and its passionate inventions." For several years to come, Saint Laurent and Bergé would return and purchase various properties in Morocco. They acquired Dar Es Saada in 1974, Villa Oasis 45 and Majorelle Garden in 1980, and Villa Mabrouka in 1997.

In 1983, Saint Laurent and Bergé bought a neo-gothic villa, Château Gabriel in Benerville-sur-Mer, near Deauville, France. Saint Laurent was a great admirer of Marcel Proust who had been a frequent guest of Gaston Gallimard, one of the previous owners of the villa. He had each bedroom named after the characters in Marcel Proust's À la recherche du temps perdu (Remembrance of Things Past).

=== Collection ===
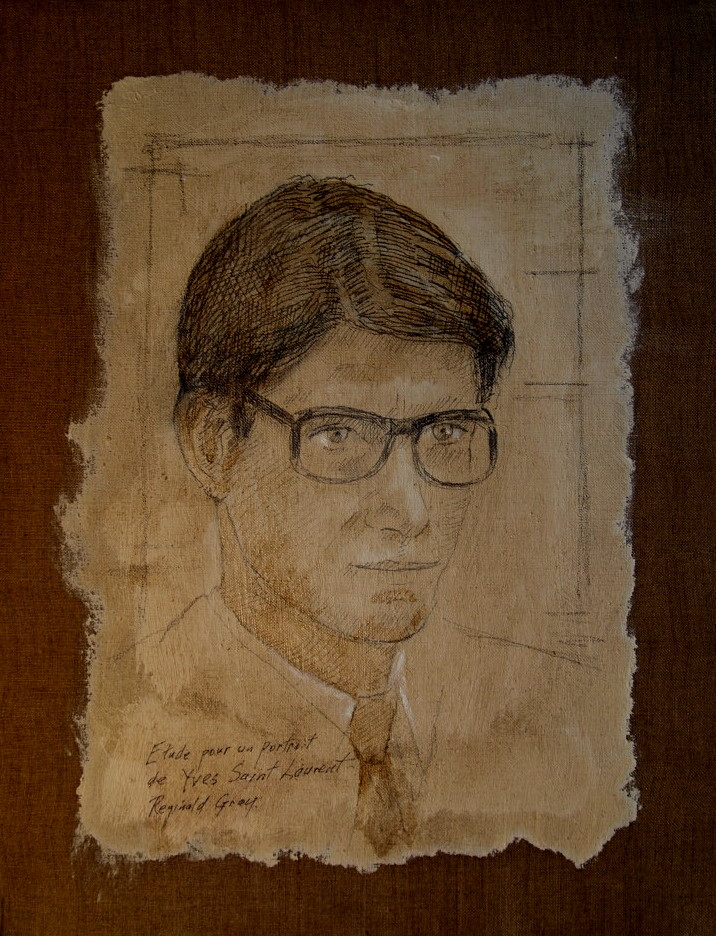
Study of Yves Saint Laurent by Reginald Gray, 1976

In February 2009, an auction of 733 items from Saint Laurent and Bergé's collection was held by Christie's at the Grand Palais, ranging from paintings by Picasso to ancient Egyptian sculptures. The proceeds went to HIV and AIDS research.

Before the sale commenced, the Chinese government tried to stop the sale of two of twelve bronze statue heads taken from the Old Summer Palace in China during the Second Opium War. A French judge dismissed the claim and the sculptures, heads of a rabbit and a rat, sold for €15,745,000. However, the anonymous buyer revealed himself to be Cai Mingchao, a representative of the PRC's National Treasures Fund, and claimed that he would not pay for them on "moral and patriotic grounds". The heads remained in Bergé's possession until acquired by François Pinault, owner of a number of luxury brands including Yves Saint Laurent. He then donated them to China in a ceremony on 29 June 2013.

On the first day of the sale, Henri Matisse's painting Les coucous, tapis bleu et rose broke the previous world record set in 2007 for a Matisse work and sold for 32 million euros. The record-breaking sale realized 342.5 million euros (£307 million). The subsequent auction, 17–20 November, included 1,185 items from the couple's Normandy villa. While not as impressive as the first auction, it featured the designer's last Mercedes-Benz car and his Hermès luggage.

== Accolades and legacy ==
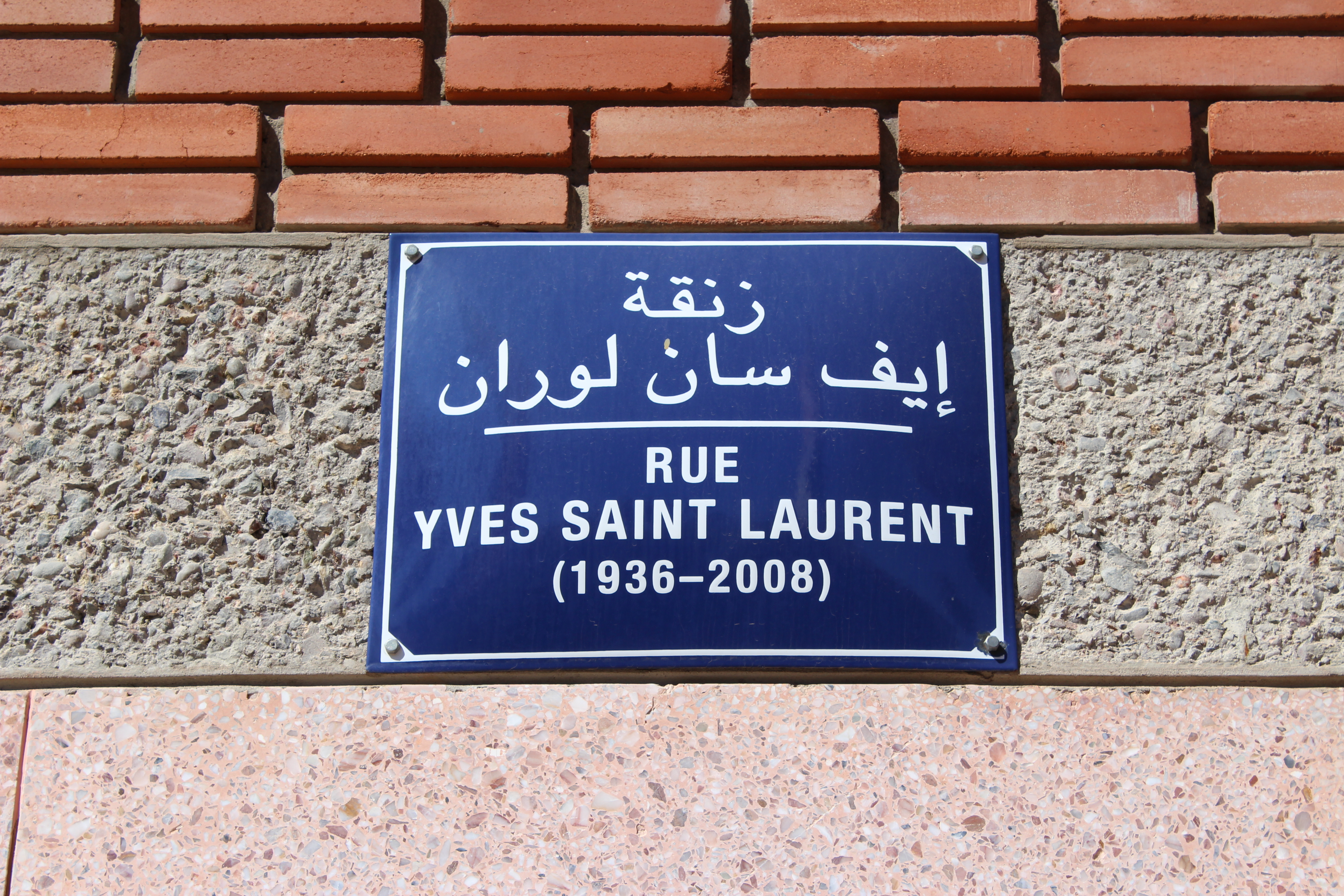
Rue Yves Saint Laurent in Marrakesh

In 1982, Saint Laurent received the International Fashion Award from the Council of Fashion Designers of America.

In 1983, Saint Laurent became the first living fashion designer to be honored by the Metropolitan Museum of Art with a solo exhibition.

In 1985, Saint Laurent was awarded an Oscar de la mode for his 'contribution to the history of fashion' at The Oscars of Fashion event in Paris.

In 1999, Saint Laurent received the Geoffrey Beene Lifetime Achievement Award at the CFDA Fashion Awards.

In 2001, Saint Laurent was awarded the rank of Commander of the Légion d'Honneur by French President Jacques Chirac.

In 2007, Saint Laurent was awarded the rank of Grand officier de la Légion d'honneur by French President Nicolas Sarkozy.

In 2004, Saint Laurent created a foundation with Bergé in Paris to trace the history of the house of YSL, complete with 15,000 objects and 5,000 pieces of clothing.

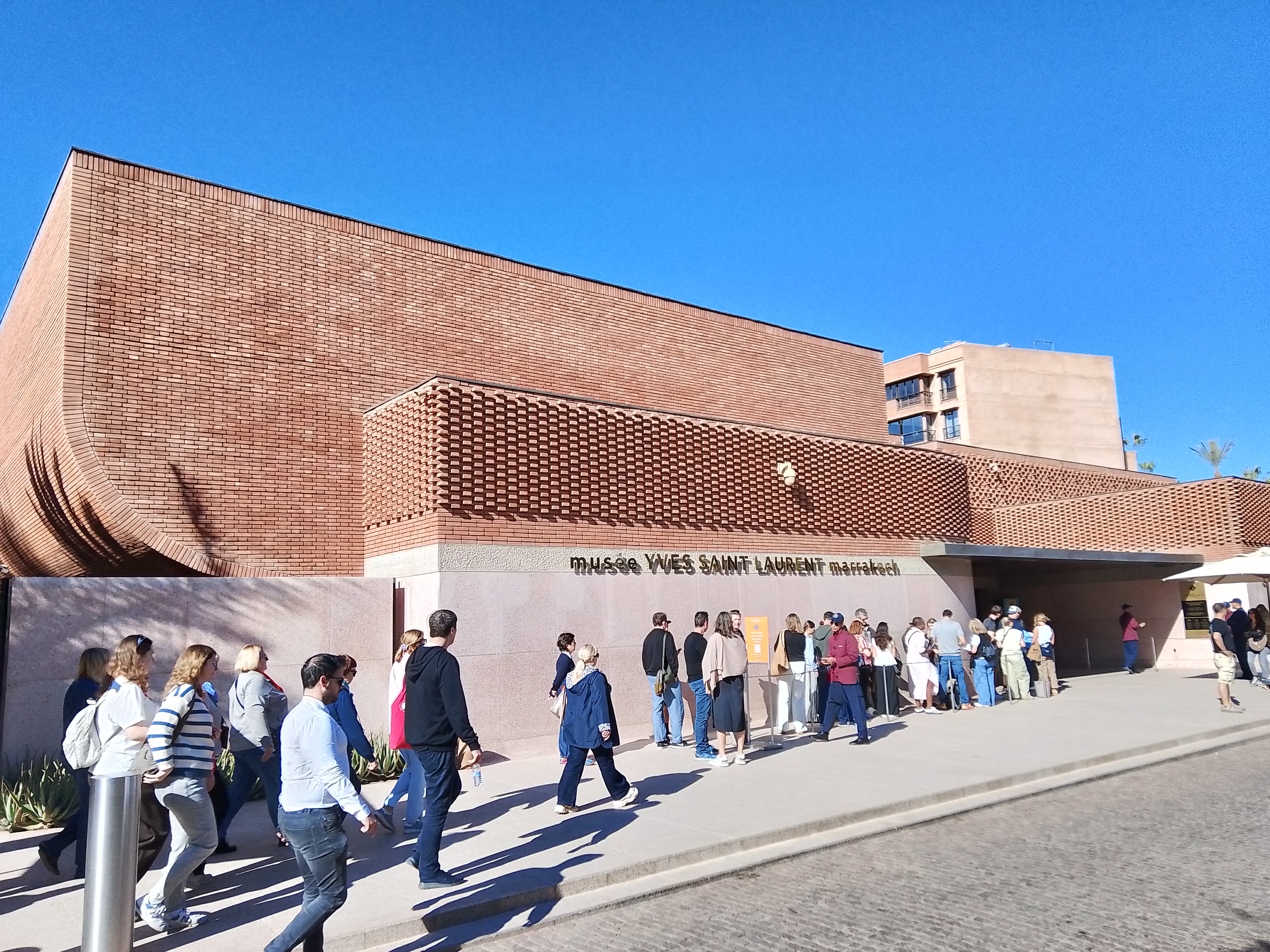
YSL museum in Marrakesh

In 2009, Forbes rated Saint Laurent the top-earning dead celebrity.

In 2010, the street in front of the Majorelle Garden in Marrakesh was renamed the Rue Yves Saint Laurent in his honor.

In 2022, the "Yves Saint Laurent Aux Musées" exhibition was held simultaneously at six Parisian cultural institutions: the Centre Pompidou, the Musée d'Art Moderne de Paris, the Musée du Louvre, the Musée d’Orsay, the Musée National Picasso–Paris, and the Musée Yves Saint Laurent Paris, demonstrating the enduring legacy of his work and his lifelong fascination with art. This exhibition highlighted his connections to various art forms and his ability to blend fashion with artistic expression.

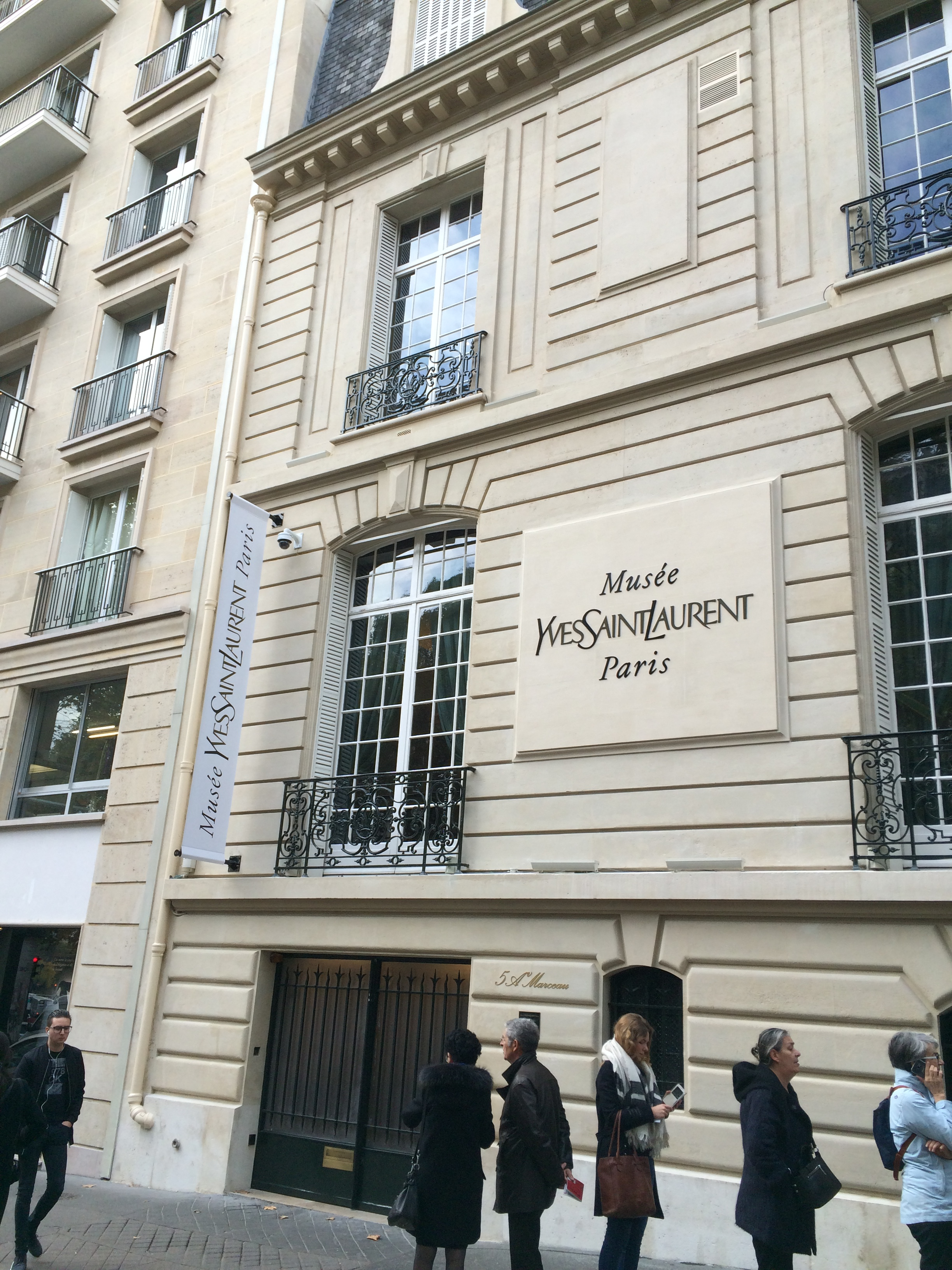
Musée Yves Saint Laurent in Paris

=== Museums ===
The Yves Saint Laurent Museum in Paris, housed in the old Fondation Pierre Bergé-Yves Saint Laurent, opened its doors in 2017. Through a continuously updated collection display, the museum chronicles his career. The exhibition space was renovated by stage designer Nathalie Crinière and interior designer Jacques Grange.

The Yves Saint Laurent Museum in Marrakesh, also opened in 2017. Pierre Bergé personally chose the thousands of pieces of apparel and haute couture accessories housed in the 43,000-square-foot structure, which was created by the Paris-based studio Studio KO.

Saint Laurent's childhood home in Oran, Algeria, where he lived until the age of 18, was purchased by the Oran entrepreneur Mohamed Affane. He transformed it into a museum, Résidence Yves Saint Laurent Oran, which opened in 2022. The period furniture was recovered and around 400 sketches by Yves Saint-Laurent are exhibited, along with childhood photos of the designer.

== In popular culture ==
=== Films ===
- 2002: David Teboul's Yves Saint Laurent: His Life and Times
- 2002: Yves Saint Laurent: 5 Avenue Marceau 75116 Paris
- 2009: Tout Terriblement
- 2010: Pierre Thoretton's L'Amour fou
- 2014: Yves Saint Laurent by Pierre Niney
- 2014: Saint Laurent by Gaspard Ulliel
- 2019: Yves Saint Laurent: The Last Collections

=== Television ===
- 1965: Appeared on 24 October as a "mystery guest" on the American television game show What's My Line?
- 2024: Becoming Karl Lagerfeld by Arnaud Valois

== Gallery ==
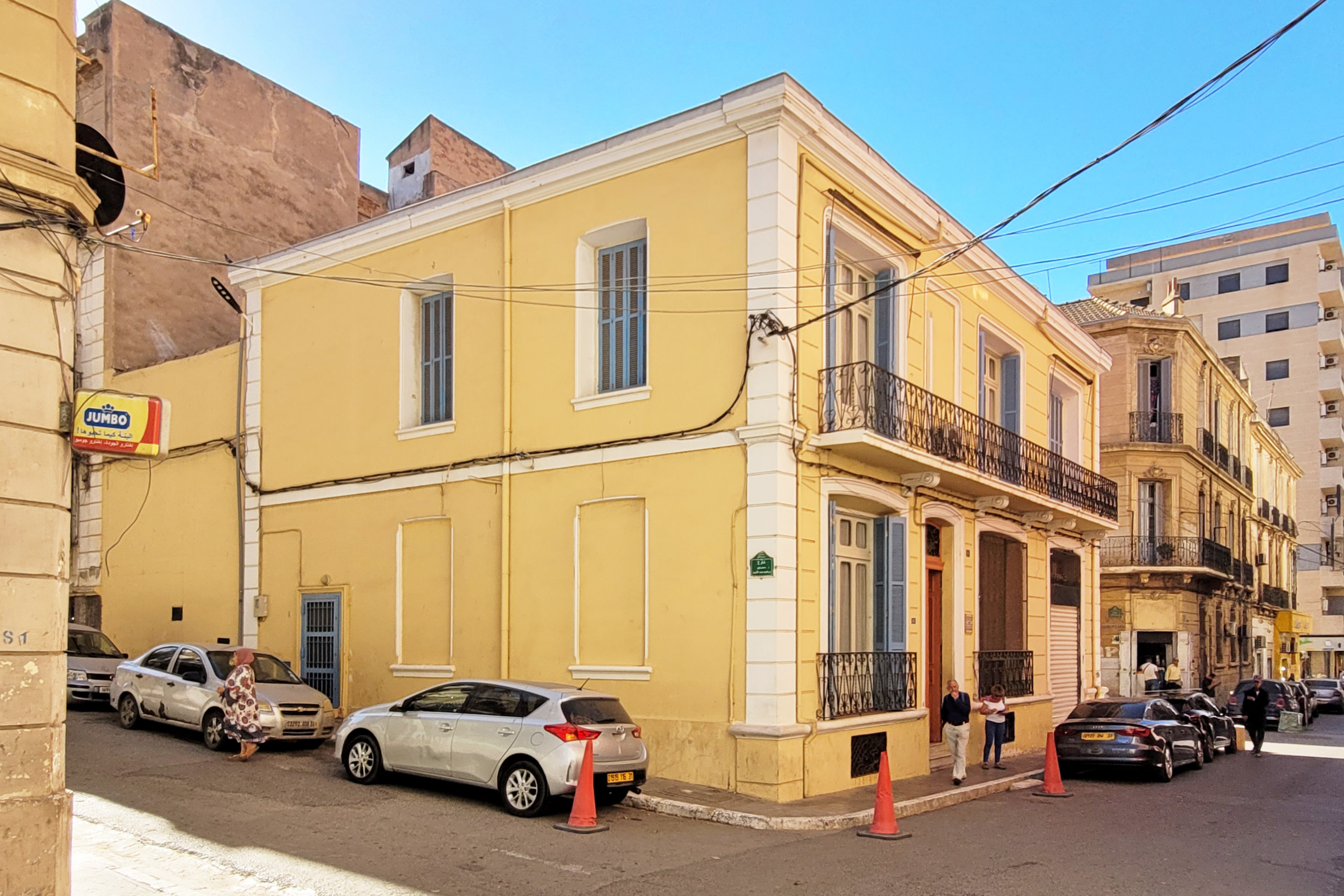
Saint Laurent's Childhood Home, Oran

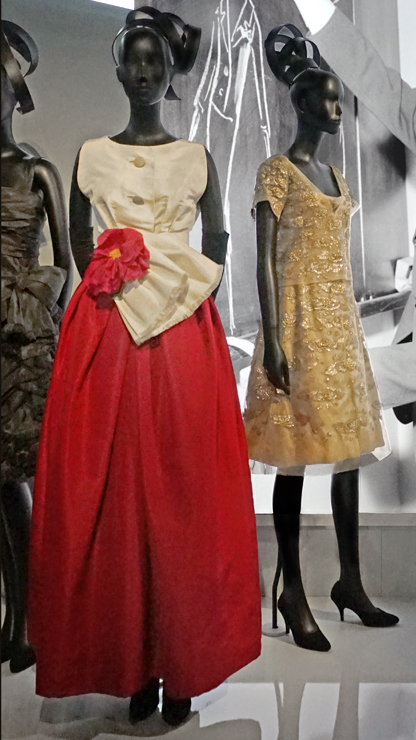
Two Dresses, 1958

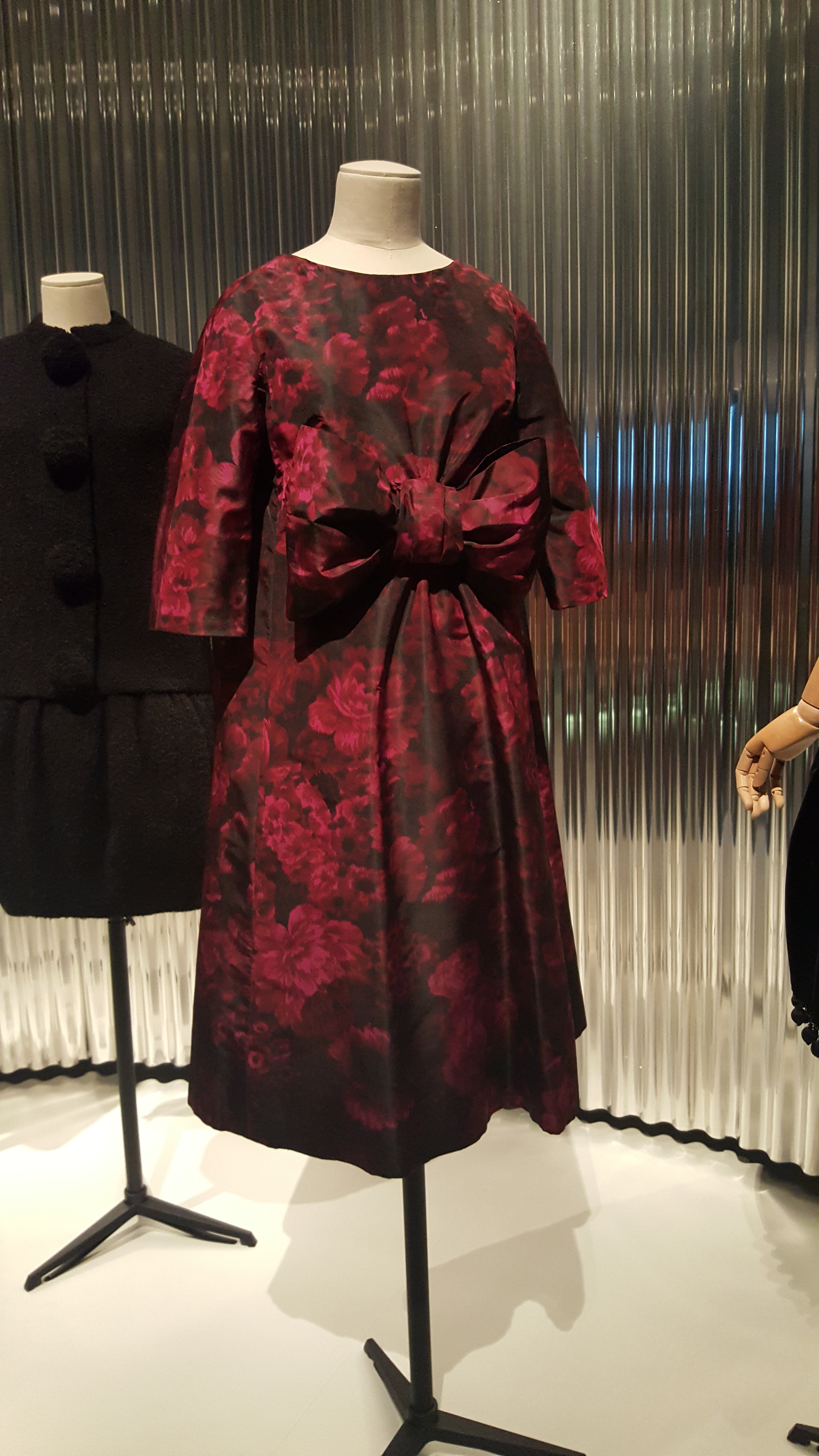
Faille Smock Dress, 1958

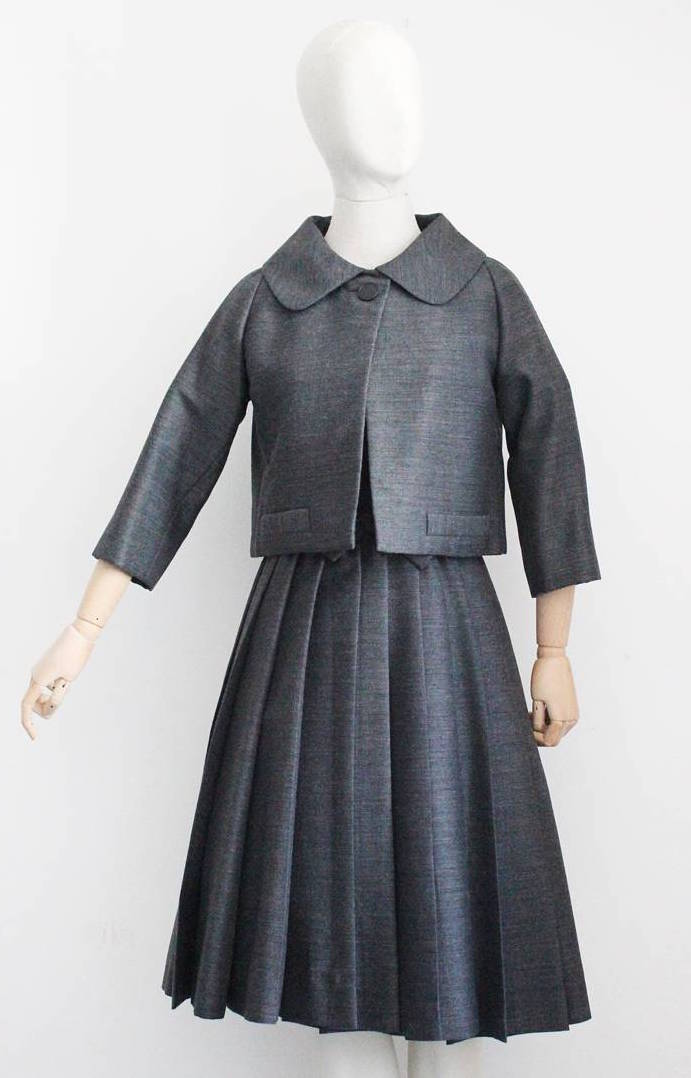
The "Zou Zou" Suit, 1958

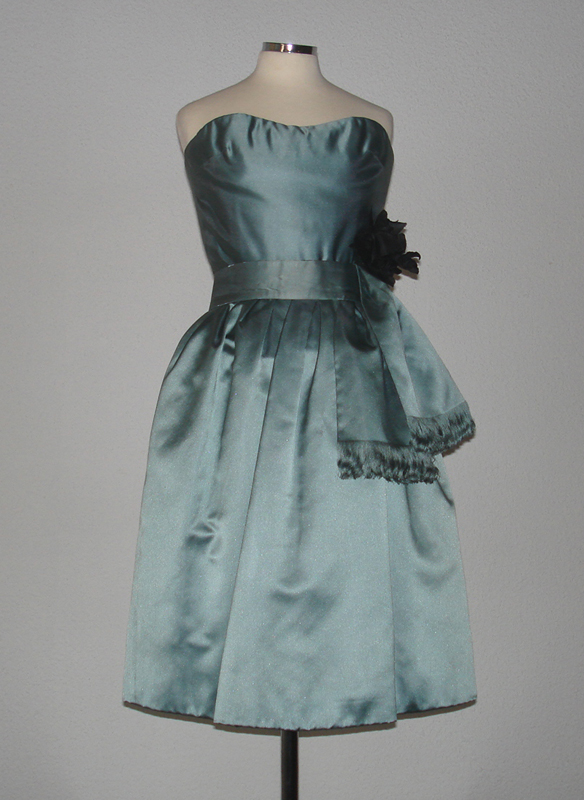
Satin Cocktail Dress for Dior, 1959

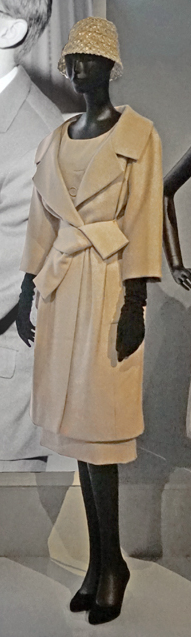
Cashmere Ensemble for Dior, 1959

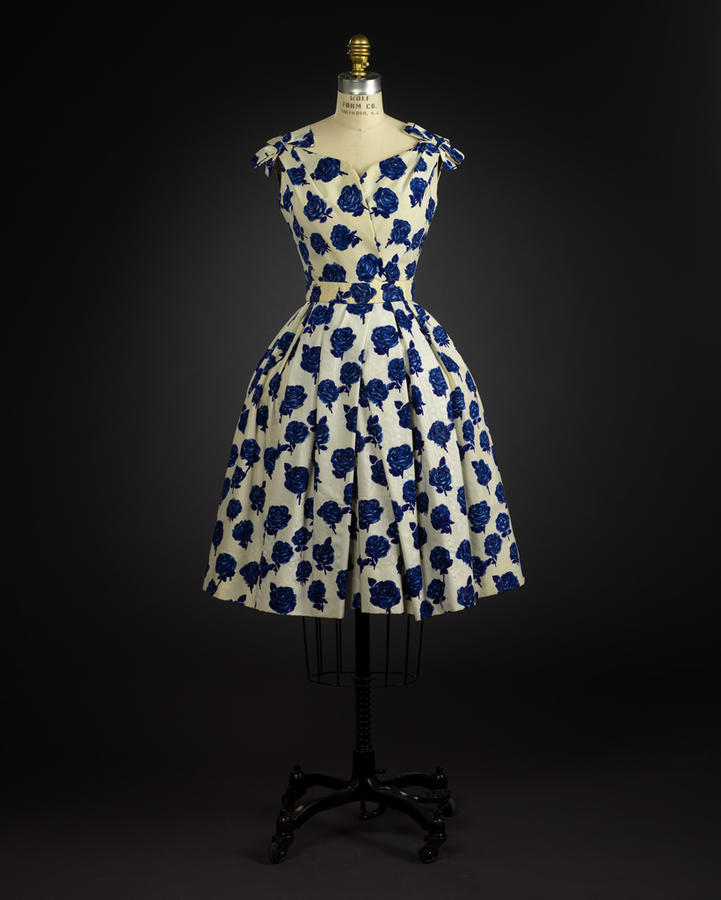
Cotton Cocktail Dress for Dior, 1960

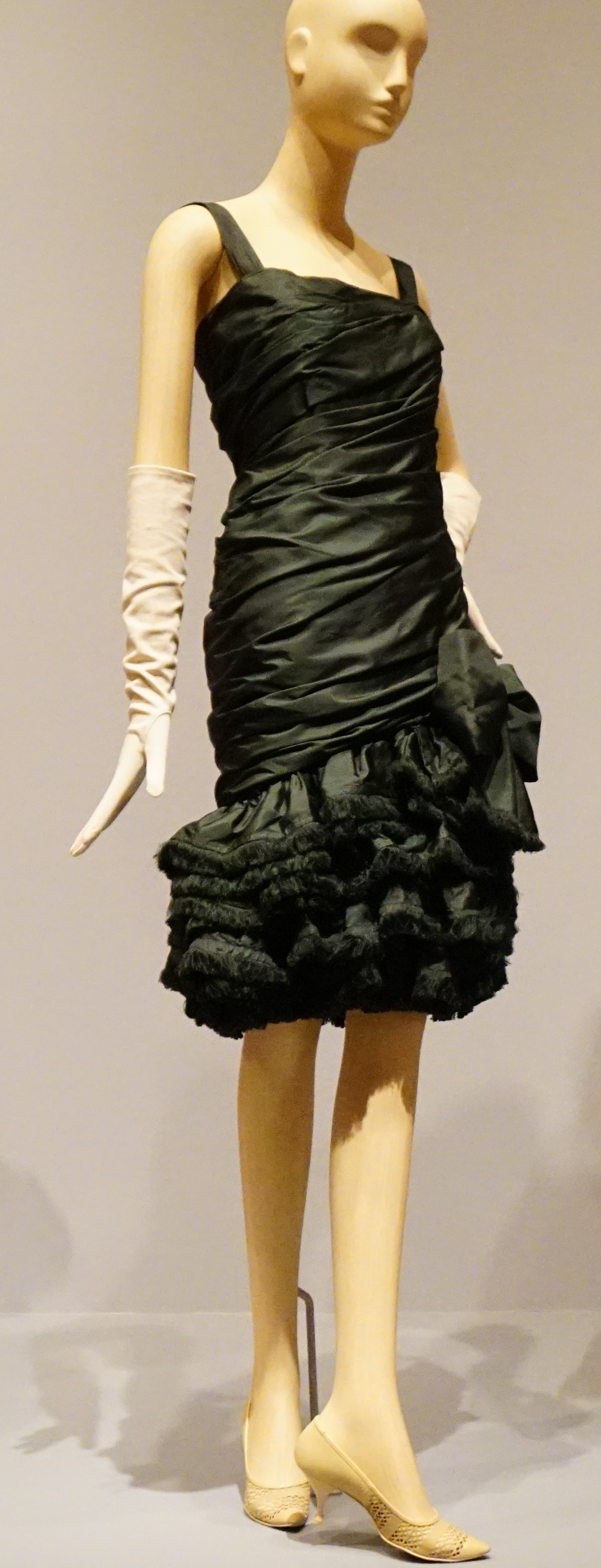
Taffeta Cocktail Dress for Dior, 1960

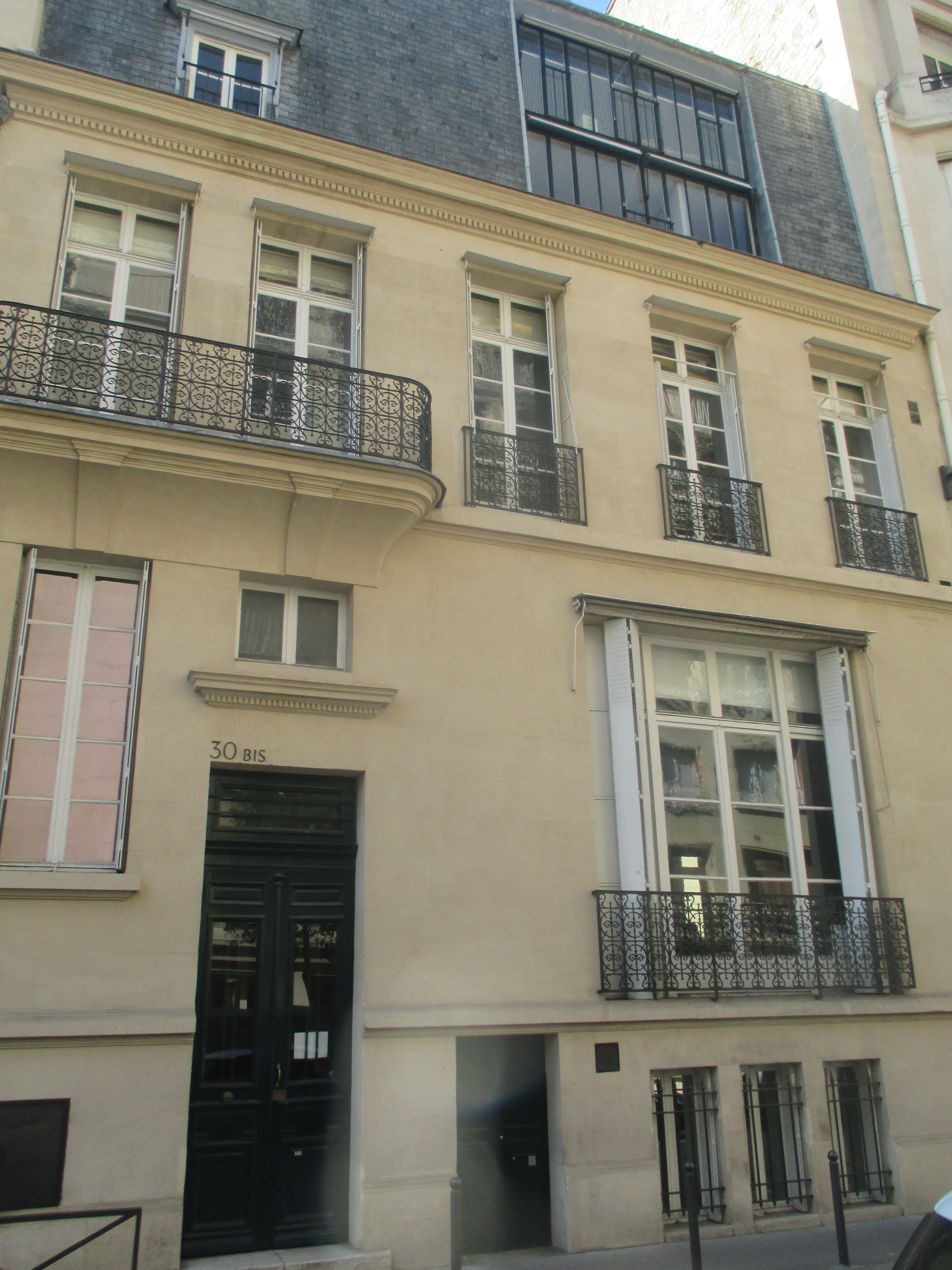
The first House of Yves Saint Laurent on rue Spontini, 1962

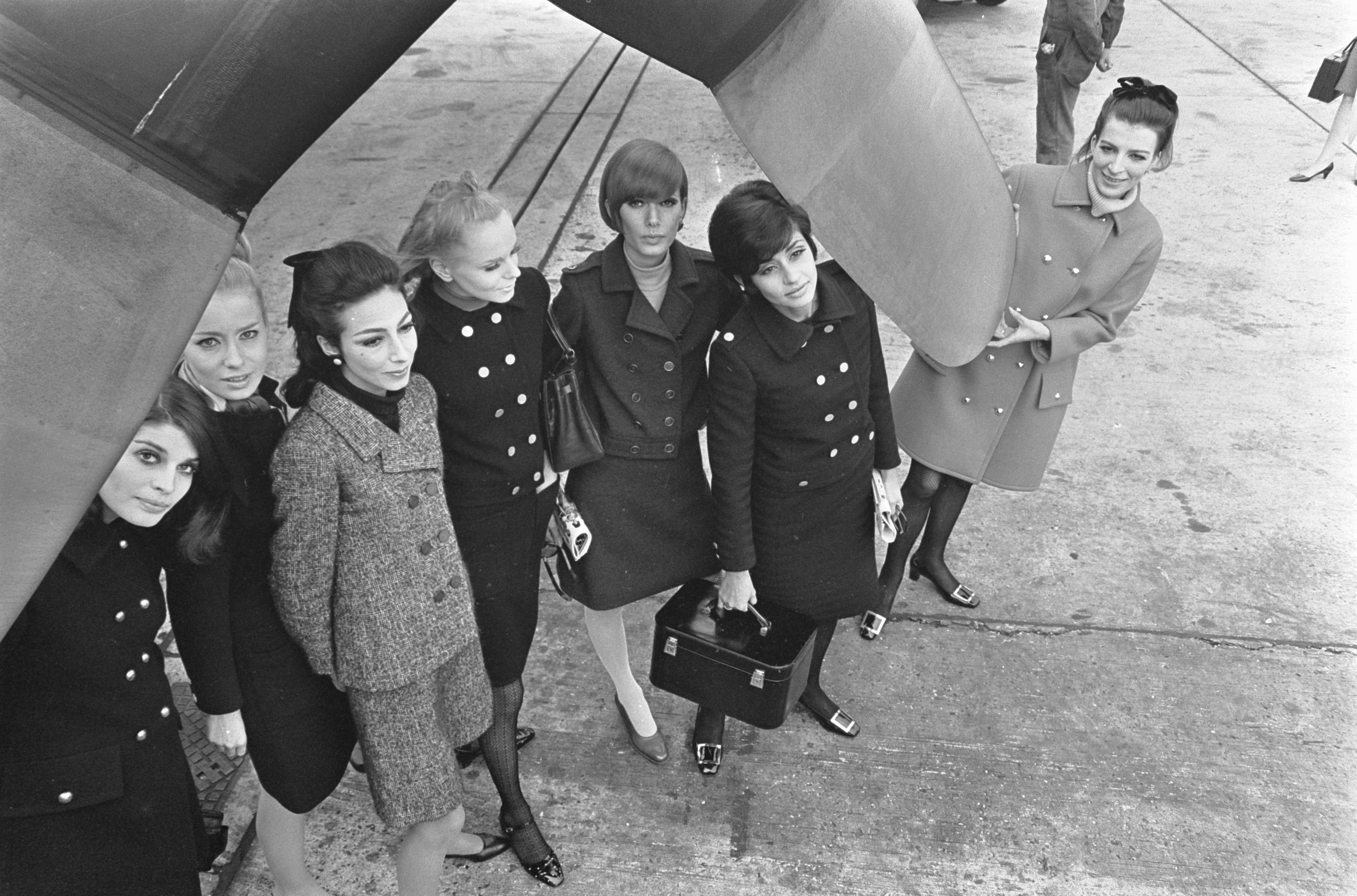
YSL Tweed Suits and Pea Coats, 1962

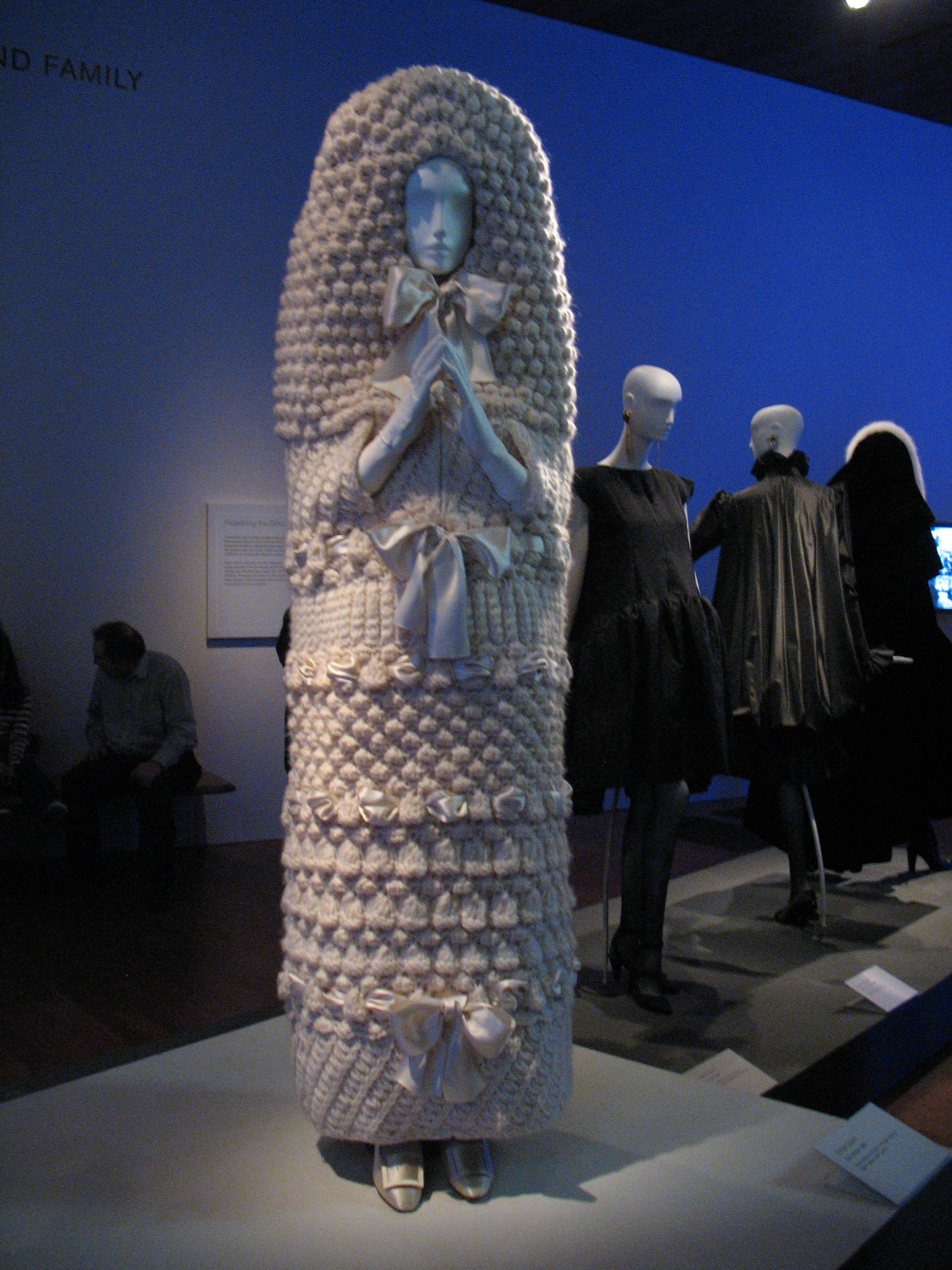
Knitted Wedding Dress, 1965

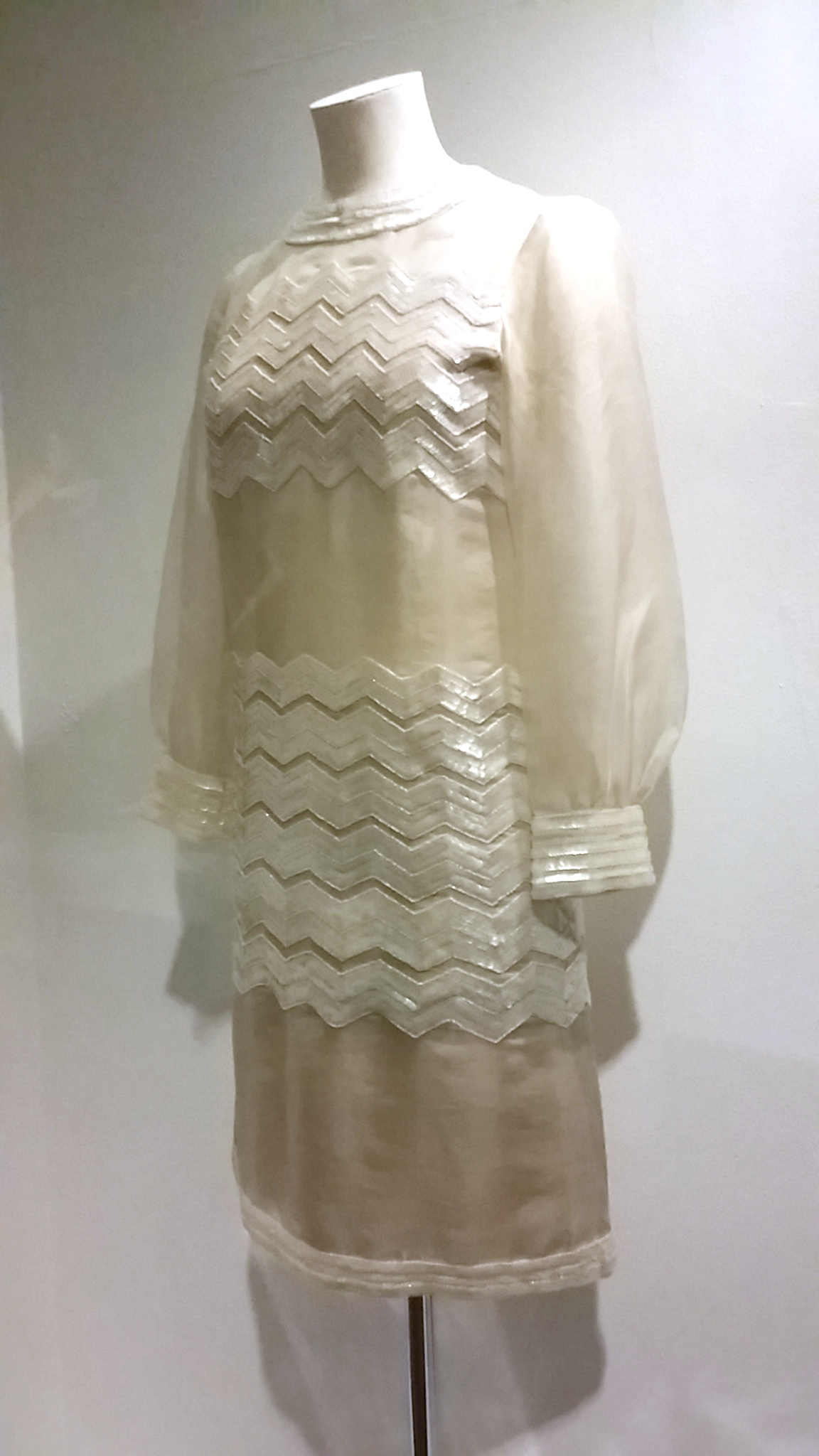
Sheer Embroidered Cocktail Dress, 1968

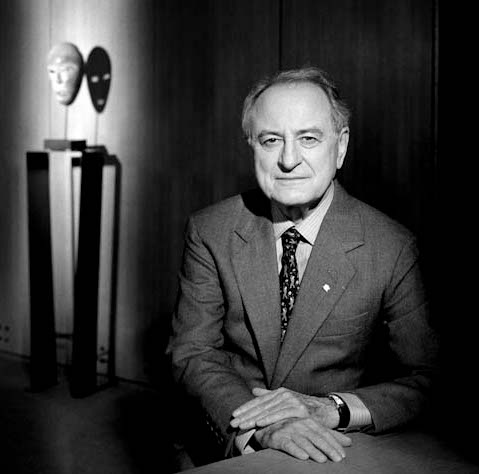
Pierre Bergé in 1998
