= Becoming Karl Lagerfeld =

- Genre: Biographical drama
- Created by: Isaure Pisani-Ferry; Jennifer Have; Raphaëlle Bacqué
- Starring: Daniel Brühl; Théodore Pellerin; Arnaud Valois; Alex Lutz; Agnès Jaoui; Sunnyi Melles
- Original language: French
- No. of seasons: 1
- No. of episodes: 6

Production
- Executive producers: Isabelle Degeorges; Arnaud de Crémiers; Jérôme Salle
- Production company: Gaumont Television

Original release
- Network: Star (Disney+)
- Release: June 7, 2024

Becoming Karl Lagerfeld is a French television series created by Isaure Pisani-Ferry, Jennifer Have, and Raphaëlle Bacqué. It stars Daniel Brühl as Karl Lagerfeld. Filming began in early March 2023 in France, Monaco, and Italy. The six-episode series was released on Disney+'s Star hub on June 7, 2024.

== Plot ==
The series follows the rise of Karl Lagerfeld through the world of haute couture in 1970s Paris, telling the story of both his career in high fashion and personal relationships.

== Cast ==
- Daniel Brühl as Karl Lagerfeld
- Théodore Pellerin as Jacques de Bascher
- Arnaud Valois as Yves Saint Laurent
- Alex Lutz as Pierre Bergé
- Agnès Jaoui as Gaby Aghion
- Sunnyi Melles as Marlene Dietrich
- Théodora Breux as Anita Briey
- Jeanne Damas as Paloma Picasso
- Claire Laffut as Loulou de la Falaise
- Paul Spera as Andy Warhol
- Carmen Giardina as Anna Piaggi
- Féodor Atkine as Antony de Bascher
- Caroline Archambault as Armelle de Bascher
- Victoire Du Bois as Anne de Bascher
- Lisa Kreuzer as Elisabeth Lagerfeld
- Anouk Féral as Rosemarie Le Gallais
- Julia Faure as Francine Crescent
- Clara Bretheau as Diane de Beauvau-Craon
- Geoffrey Carlassare as Geoffrey le majordome
- Stefano Di Zazzo as Gianni

== Production ==
In March 2023, it was announced that a television series around the life and career of famed fashion designer Karl Lagerfeld, was in production for the streaming service Disney+, with Daniel Brühl starring as the titular character. Also joining the cast were Théodore Pellerin as Jacques de Bascher, Arnaud Valois as Yves Saint Laurent, Alex Lutz as Pierre Bergé, Agnès Jaoui as Gaby Aghion, and Sunnyi Melles as Marlene Dietrich. Jérôme Salle would direct the episodes one, two, and six, while Audrey Estrougo would be directing the other three episodes.

=== Filming ===
Principal photography began in early March 2023, in France, Monaco, and Italy.

== Release ==
The six-episode series was released on Disney+'s Star hub on June 7, 2024.

== Reception ==
On the review aggregator website Rotten Tomatoes, the series holds a critics’ approval rating of 75% based on 16 reviews.

Leila Latif of The Guardian awarded the series four stars out of five, saying “This biopic of one of fashion’s most distinctive icons is a visual feast”.

On NPR, John Powers wrote, "Becoming Karl Lagerfeld feels urgent and alive — like a present day story that happens to be set in the past."
