= Claire Laffut =

Belgian singer-songwriter (born 1994)

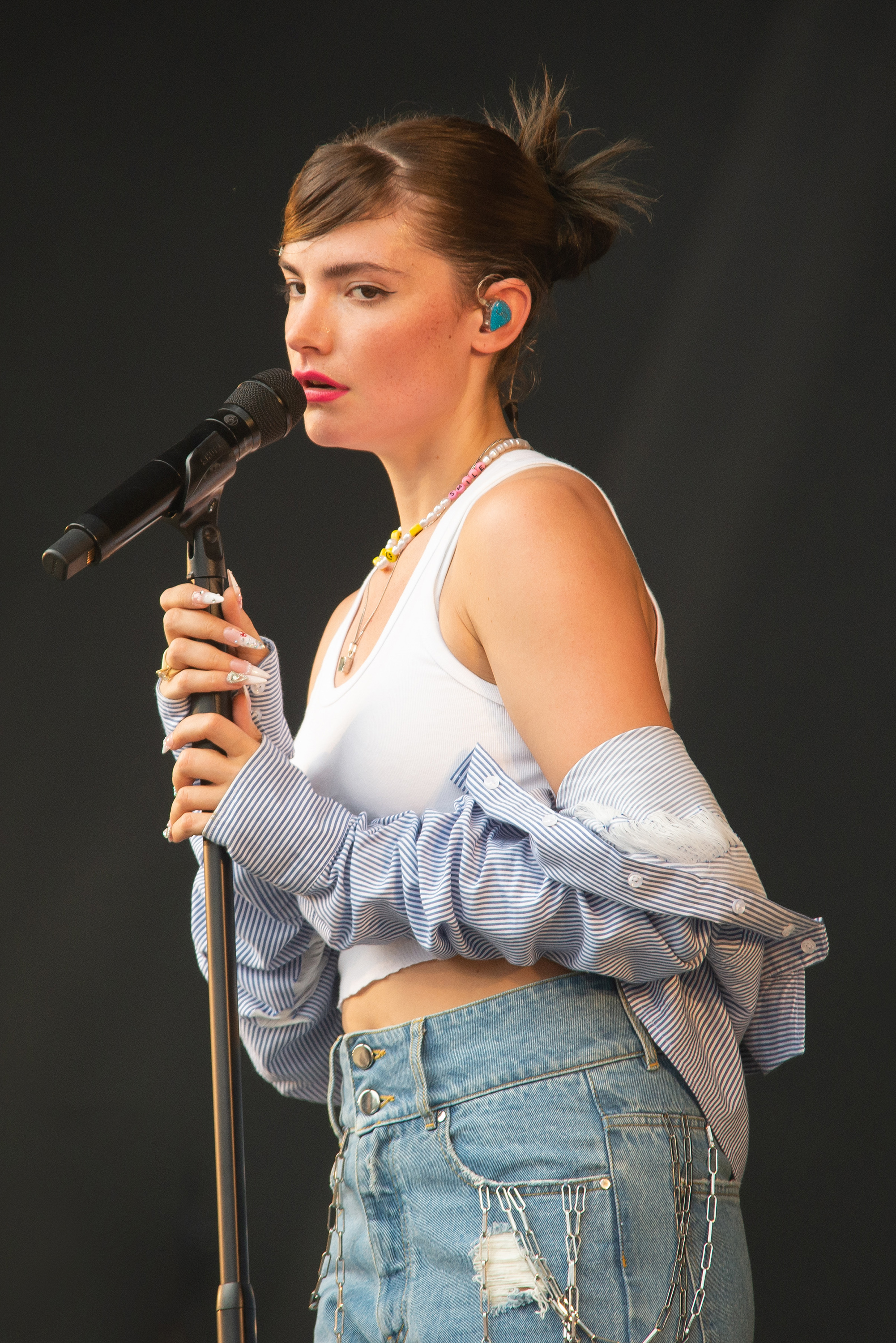
- Laffut at the Papillons de Nuit festival (2022)
- Born: 21 June 1994 (age 32); Namur, Belgium
- Occupations: Singer; songwriter; model; actress
- Years active: 2018–present
- Modelling information
- Height: 1.69 m (5 ft 6 1/2 in)
- Hair colour: Brown
- Eye colour: Hazel
- Agency: Ford Models (Europe); Dominique Models (Brussels)
- Musical career
- Genre: French pop
- Instrument: Vocals
- Labels: Green United Music; Decca
- Website: clairelaffut.tumblr.com

Claire Laffut (French: [klɛʁ lafy]; born 21 June 1994) is a Belgian singer-songwriter, artist, and model. Born in Namur, she was featured on the cover of Elle Belgium in December 2013. She released her first album, Bleu, in September 2021.

== Life and career ==
=== 1994–2012: Early life ===
Claire Laffut was born on 21 June 1994 in Namur, Belgium to Annick and Frédéric Laffut. She has a twin brother, Corentin. Growing up she tried many different activities such as classical dance, piano and drawing. At age 15/16 she joined dance school but she injured her ankle and decided to take up drawing.

=== 2013–2018: LACLAIRE and career beginnings ===
In October 2013, LACLAIRE skin art was launched, which was owned and created by Laffut. It was a company that designed and made temporary tattoos.

She was featured on the cover of Elle Belgique in December 2013. Also at this time she signed with Ford Models (Europe).

In 2015 whilst visiting a friend (photographer, Charlotte Ambramow) in Paris, France, she decided to stay and move to the city.

She was one of the faces of Chanel's Gabrielle campaign for their new perfume (Gabrielle Chanel) in 2018.

She released the E.P. "Mojo" in November 2019. The EP features four tracks (Vérité, Mojo, Gare du Nord, La fessée).

=== 2019–present: Bleu and Becoming Karl Lagerfeld ===
She talked about her first album in late 2019 and that it would be released in 2020 and each song would be connected to a work of art designed by Laffut.

In 2020 she moved back to Belgium and along with this because of the COVID-19 pandemic her debut album was delayed.

On 3 September 2021, her first album Bleu was released it was influenced by Latin and Afro rhythms and inspired by the colour blue and her youth. Later in the year she performed for Valentino x Boiler Room.

In March 2023, it was announced that Laffut would be playing British fashion designer Loulou de la Falaise in the Disney+ series Becoming Karl Lagerfeld about the rise of Karl Lagerfeld in the 1970s. Also in 2023 she released a furniture collection in collaboration NV Gallery.

Laffut was on the cover of Belgian L'Officiel in 2024.

== Artistry ==
Laffut has citied many different influences for her art, music and life such as singers Avril Lavigne, Burna Boy, Kali Uchis, Jorja Smith, Lizzy Mercer Descloux and close friend/collaborator Yseult. Electronic music producer Mort Garson. Her father was also a major influence on her music taste introducing her to music and going shopping at flea markets and looking for records with Laffut when she was younger he introduced her to the techno genre and singers Claude François and Fela Kuti. He also introduced her to Nigerian drummer Tony Allen who she recorded a song with which was never released. She has also been influenced by artist Henri Rousseau in her works more specifically his paintings of jungles and the painting La Charmeuse de Serpents.

== Discography ==
Albums
Title	Details
Bleu	Released: 3 September 2021; Label: Decca Records France; Formats: CD, LP, streaming; Peaked at #46 on the Ultratop albums charts

Extended Plays
Title	Details
"Mojo"	Released: 9 November 2018; Label: Decca Records France; Formats: CD, LP, streaming

List of singles, with year released, selected chart positions and album name shown
Title	Year	Peak Chart Positions	Album
Title	Year	Belgium	Album
"Vérité"	2018	—	Bleu
"Nudes (feat. Yseult)"	2019	17	Bleu
"Étrange Mélange"	2020	—	Bleu
"Hiroshima"	2021	—	Bleu

== Filmography ==
=== Film ===
Year	Title	Role	Notes	Ref.
2017	On l'appelait Ruby (Ruby is Dead)	Margot Monnier		
2017	Off Ice	Manon	Short film	
2017	Poke	Zoé	Short film	
2019	Égo-Système	Valentine	Short film	

=== Television ===
Year	Title	Role	Notes	Ref.
2024	Becoming Karl Lagerfeld	Loulou de la Falaise		

=== Music videos ===
Year	Title	Artist(s)	Director(s)	Ref.
2017	Mini Girls	Tatum Rush	Mathieu Cacheux	
2018	Vérite	Herself	Jamie-James Medina	
2018	Mojo	Herself	The Bardos	
2018	Gare du Nord	Herself	Alexandre Brisa	
2019	Nudes	Herself	Jean-Charles Charavin	
2021	Hiroshima	Herself	Partizan	

== Awards and nominations ==
Award	Year	Category	Nominee(s)	Result
Shark Awards	2018	Best Colour Grading	Vérité (Music Video)	Nominated
D6bels Music Awards	2019	French solo artist	Herself	Nominated
D6bels Music Awards	2019	French song		Nominated
D6bels Music Awards	2020	Female solo artist	Herself	Nominated
D6bels Music Awards	2020	French song		Nominated

== Tours ==
=== Headlining ===
- Mojo Tour (2018)
- Summer Tour 2019 (2019)
- Bleu Tour (2021)
- Summer Tour 2022 (2022)
