= Jacques de Bascher =

French dandy (1951–1989)

- de Bascher, photographed by Alex Chatelain, c. 1970s
- Born: Jacques de Bascher; 8 July 1951; Saigon, French Indochina
- Died: 3 September 1989 (aged 38); Garches, Hauts-de-Seine, France
- Other name: Jako
- Known for: Socialite
- Partner: Karl Lagerfeld (1972–1989)

Jacques de Bascher (8 July 1951 – 3 September 1989) was a French dandy and socialite best known for being Karl Lagerfeld's longtime partner. A member of Paris's jet set, de Bascher was also briefly the lover of Yves Saint Laurent.

== Biography ==
=== Early life and education ===
Jacques de Bascher was born on 8 July 1951, the son of Antony de Bascher (1909–1975), governor of the province of Cholon in Vietnam and an executive of Shell's insurance department on his return to France in 1955. Bascher's mother, Armelle Petit, is descended from a line of landowners in Limousin. He had a younger brother named Xavier, two older sisters, Anne and Elisabeth, and an older brother named Gonzalve. He spent his childhood in a bourgeois Catholic family, between an apartment in Neuilly-sur-Seine on boulevard Commandant-Charcot, which overlooks the Bois de Boulogne and the Chateau Berrière near Nantes.

Jacques de Bascher studied at the small high school Pasteur, then high school Janson de Sailly, and finally high school Charlemagne. At fifteen, he befriended Bertrand, a teacher at a Paris lycée, who was ten years older than him. Bertrand was French, gay, refined—an admirer of Oscar Wilde. He lived in a small maid's room atop a building in the 16th arrondissement of Paris, often visited by curious schoolboys drawn to his worldly charm. de Bascher was fascinated by Bertrand, who wrote letters in Latin and drove a Jaguar, sometimes picking him up from school in it. In March 1967, Bertrand introduced him to another student, Renaud de Beaugourdon, and that Easter, he took the two boys on a cultural trip to England. Both boys were shocked when Bertrand declared his intention to be married, and their friendship came to an end.

In 1969, Jacques de Bascher enrolled in the University of Nanterre to study law, but he left within a year and enlisted in the French Navy. He started his service on the ship Orage, which was sailing to Martinique and Papeete. He became some sort of reporter, writing a ship's newsletter and airing music and interviews on the ship's radio. He served a month's imprisonment at the Arue camp in Tahiti for provocative behavior and misbehaving with his mates. After just nine months in the navy, he was sent back to France. During this service, he befriended a lot of people, including Philippe Heurtault, who became his photographer in later years.

When he returned to Paris, he attended the Panthéon-Assas University for a few months and became a steward for Air France in 1972, but it was high-society clubs that attracted him. According to Gilles Martin-Chauffier, for fifteen years, Jacques de Bascher "evolved like a snake in the grass" between the gardens of the Tuileries, the five-stars, the Parisian backrooms, the Palace, the rue Sainte-Anne, (Club Sept), the Blue Hand in Montreuil, the castle of his family and the big festivals of the fashion world.

=== Relationship with Lagerfeld ===
In 1972, Jacques de Bascher first met Karl Lagerfeld at the gay club Le Nuage at the age of twenty-one. A few months later, after he resigned from Air France, he moved to a small studio that Lagerfeld paid for him on rue du Dragon, a few minutes from Lagerfeld's place; they never lived together but were in a relationship until the death of Bascher in 1989, from AIDS. Lagerfeld claimed their relationship was platonic and non-sexual. Lagerfeld told French journalist Marie Ottavi:

I infinitely loved that boy but I had no physical contact with him...Of course, I was seduced by his physical charm...

Karl Lagerfeld appreciated Bascher's vast literary culture, impertinence, aristocratic appearance, and his manner of dressing. Kenzo Takada hired Jacques' brother Xavier de Bascher to be his general manager. They usually spent their time in gay nightclubs, like "Le 7".

In 1973, Yves Saint Laurent, at the time still companion of Pierre Bergé, fell in love with Jacques de Bascher. While Lagerfeld pretended he didn't notice, Yves Saint Laurent and Jacques de Bascher had an unbalanced and destructive relationship. Bergé threatened de Bascher, who put an end to this affair six months later in 1974.

During these years, Jacques de Bascher, who did not work and was supported by Lagerfeld, fell into risky sexual practices, and eventually drugs and alcohol put him into a paranoid state. Sex was a huge part of de Bascher's life. He had relationships with both men and women. He was known for organizing orgies and an infamous BDSM party named "Black Moratorium", which was funded by Lagerfeld.

=== Last years and death ===
Jacques de Bascher discovered that he was HIV positive in 1984. At the end of his life, he cut himself off from everyone, unable to bear his physical decline. He died of AIDS at Raymond Poincaré University Hospital in 1989, watched over by Karl Lagerfeld, who had an extra bed installed by his bedside.

== In pop culture ==
- He was portrayed by Xavier Lafitte in the 2014 film Yves Saint Laurent.
- He was portrayed by Louis Garrel in the 2014 film Saint Laurent.
- He was portrayed by Théodore Pellerin in the 2024 TV series Becoming Karl Lagerfeld.

== See also ==
- Dandyism within France
