= Le Smoking =

Women's tuxedo suit

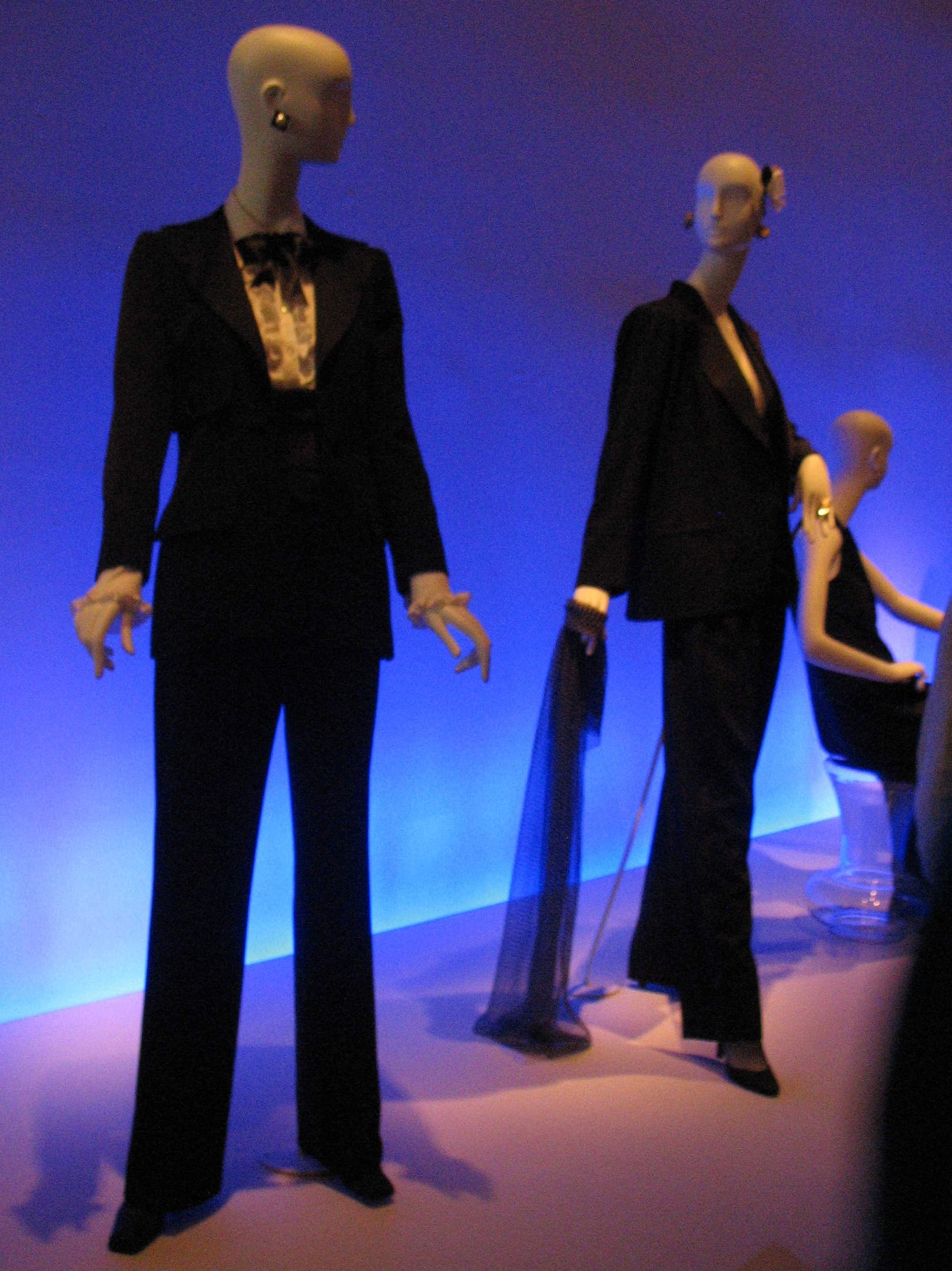
Examples of Le Smoking in a De Young Museum exhibit.

Le Smoking is a women's tuxedo suit created in 1966 by couturier Yves Saint Laurent. The first suit of its kind to earn attention in the fashion world and in popular culture, it was influenced by the androgynous personal style of Saint Laurent model and muse Danielle Luquet de Saint Germain, as well as the evening dress of artist Niki de Saint-Phalle. The designer took bits and pieces from both men's suits and women's clothing, and combined it with new ideas. As the tuxedo was designed for females, it was different from the normal male tuxedo. The collar was more feminine, as the shape and curve were more subtle. The waistline of the blouse was narrowed to show the body shape, and the pants were adjusted to help elongate the leg.

It pioneered long, minimalist, androgynous styles for women, as well as the use of power suits and the pantsuit in modern-day society. Fashion photography echoes the influence of this suit in shoots that feature androgynous models with slicked-back hair in a "masculine" three-piece suit, a style that was first popularised in photographs by Helmut Newton. It was notably modelled by singer Françoise Hardy, who was a muse to the designer. Saint Laurent was seen by many as having empowered women by giving them the option to wear clothes that were normally worn by men with influence and power.

This suit has continued to influence fashion designers' collections through the 2000s.

In French and many other languages, the pseudo-anglicism smoking refers to tuxedo/black tie clothing. It is a false friend deriving from the Victorian fashion of the smoking jacket.
