= Betty Catroux =

Brazilian-born French former model (born 1945)

Betty Catroux (born Betty Saint in 1945) is a Brazilian-born French former Chanel model. She has been cited as a muse by both Yves Saint Laurent and Tom Ford.

== Early life ==
She was born in Brazil in 1945, the only child of Carmen Saint, a Brazil-born French socialite, and Elim O'Shaughnessy (1907–1966), an American diplomat. The first four years of her life were spent in Brazil before her mother ended a short marriage with a Brazilian man and took her to Paris. She had an easy childhood due to her privileged upbringing.

She did not know who her father was until the age of 12, when she discovered that her mother's "friend" was very similar to her in features. She asked her mother about the peculiar situation, to which Carmen confirmed her thoughts.

Betty had a rough start in her late teens to early adult years, when she relied on drugs and alcohol to have a good time. She and Yves Saint Laurent, a long-time friend and partner in most activities, were notorious for drugs and partying.

== Modeling career ==
Betty Catroux began her modeling career in the early sixties at the age of 17. Her first employer was Coco Chanel who has been a big fashion name in Paris for decades. It only lasted for two years before she left, claiming, "I hated it, so I decided to take some pictures just to earn money to pay for my own Chez Regine glasses ." She then met Yves Saint Laurent in 1967 who became her sidekick. She inspired him and his fashion work until his death in 2008, but she had never actually worked for him. She just wanted to have fun. The two were inseparable, spending the majority of their free time together. They had a friendly relationship until his death. Reminiscing on their friendship, Catroux said: "I had a fairytale life with him."

Catroux was a big name in the fashion world, despite her dislike for the industry. Yves Saint Laurent has called her his twin sister and referred to her as his female incarnation. Tom Ford was so inspired by her that he dedicated his debut YSL Rive Gauche collection to her. When asked about her fashion sense, Catroux said that she has "dressed the same way practically since I was born. I don't dress as a woman. I'm not interested in fashion at all."

Catroux is famed for her long white-blond hair, lanky 6-foot body, gaunt features, and androgynous appearance. She has never much cared about her style, adopting an effortless, neither feminine nor masculine appearance. Fashion had always been gifted to her through her friendships. Saint Laurent's Le Smoking tuxedo for women, which was revolutionary in the world of style, made its debut on her. She has been in the spotlight wearing Yves Saint Laurent many times.

== Personal life ==
Relationships with Loulou de la Falaise and Pierre Berge were also significant, as they were both figures in Catroux and Saint Laurent's lives. La Falaise was another of YSL's major muses. Quite the opposite of Catroux, she balanced out the light and the dark, "like a Devil and an Angel."

Berge and Catroux had a different type of relationship, as he had Saint Laurent's best interest in mind. Because Pierre and Yves were partners, it took her [Betty] about 30 years to convince him that, despite appearances, she was not, and never would be, a bad influence on Yves. The two were quite close, even after Saint Laurent's death. He was like a father figure, keeping Catroux out of trouble.

In 1968, Betty Saint married French interior decorator François Catroux, a grandson of General Georges Catroux. The couple had two daughters: Maxime, a book editor at Flammarion, and Daphné, who is married to Count Charles-Antoine Morand. Her relationships with Daphne and Maxime were easy going and unconventional, according to Daphne. She told an interviewer that she was never like a mother, more like a friend. Yet both daughters know she and Francois love them.

When not in Paris, François and Betty lived together at Les Ramades, a 16th-century stone house in the Lourmarins region of Provence, on 10 lush acres, which they bought in 1990. They lived with their two cats Mic and Mac, and did not often have visitors, according to Francois. He died in November 2020.

In an interview she said, "I did not have any activity, I am a person fully supported, maintained all my life. I do not work, I am a very exceptional case. I was so spoiled, without having any obligation except moral obviously. The only things I did were nice and fun."
