= List of botanical gardens in Morocco =

Botanical gardens in Morocco have collections consisting entirely of Morocco native and endemic species; most have a collection that include plants from around the world. There are botanical gardens and arboreta in all states and territories of Morocco, most are administered by local governments, some are privately owned.

- Majorelle Garden, Marrakesh
- Rabat Botanical Garden, Rabat
