= YSL =

YSL may refer to:

== Fashion ==
- Yves Saint Laurent (fashion house), by fashion designer Yves Saint Laurent
- Yves Saint Laurent (designer) (1936–2008), French fashion designer

== Music ==
- YSL Records (Young Stoner Life Records), a United States hip hop record label
  - YSL Records racketeering trial, a criminal case involving YSL records

== Politics ==
- Young Socialist League, former British organisation
- Young Socialist League, last incarnation of the youth wing of the historical Communist Party of Australia
- Young Socialist League, later Socialist Youth League (United States)

== Other uses ==
- Saint-Léonard Aerodrome (IATA airport code: YSL), New Brunswick, Canada
- Yankee Stadium Legacy, a baseball card set
- Yarrow Shipbuilders Limited, a former UK firm
- YSL Residences (Yonge Street Living Residences), Toronto, Ontario, Canada; a skyscraper
- Yolŋu Sign Language
- Yugoslav Second League, football league in Yugoslavia
- Yugoslav Sign Language (ISO 639 code: ysl)
- YSL, a brand of Japan Tobacco

== See also ==
- Yves Saint Laurent (disambiguation)
