= Yves Saint Laurent =

Yves Saint Laurent may refer to:

- Yves Saint Laurent (designer) (1936–2008), French fashion designer
- Yves Saint Laurent (fashion house), a luxury fashion house founded in 1961 by Yves Saint Laurent and his partner, Pierre Bergé
- Yves Saint Laurent (film), a 2014 film
- Yves Saint Laurent Museum in Marrakesh, Morocco

== See also ==
- Saint Laurent (film), a 2014 film about Yves Saint Laurent
- Saint Laurent (disambiguation)
- Yves (disambiguation)
- YSL (disambiguation)
