= Musée Yves Saint Laurent Paris =

Fashion museum in Paris, France

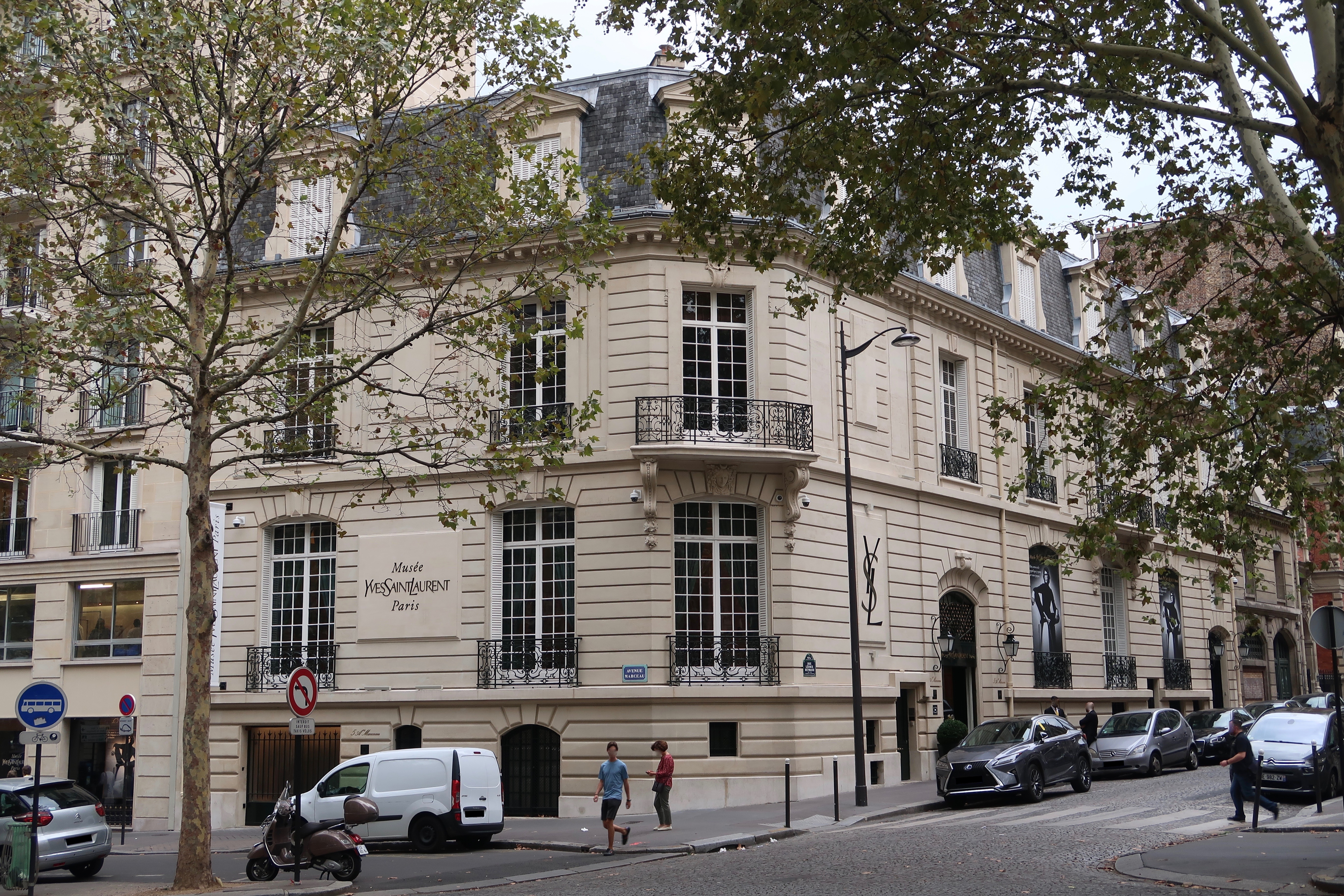
- Museum exterior, 2018.

- Location within Paris
- Established: 3 October 2017
- Location: 5 Avenue Marceau, 16th arrondissement, Paris, France
- Coordinates: 48.865619°N 2.299603°E
- Type: Fashion museum
- Collection size: More than 5,000 garments and 15,000 accessories
- Owner: Fondation Pierre Bergé – Yves Saint Laurent
- Website: museeyslparis.com

Musée Yves Saint Laurent Paris is a fashion museum in Paris, dedicated to fashion designer Yves Saint Laurent. The museum opened on 3 October 2017 at 5 Avenue Marceau in the 16th arrondissement of Paris, in the historic mansion that housed Saint Laurent's haute couture salon from 1974 to 2002.

== History ==
Fondation Pierre Bergé – Yves Saint Laurent established the museum to preserve and display the couturier's work. It opened weeks after the death of Pierre Bergé, Saint Laurent's longtime partner in life and business. A sister museum, the Yves Saint Laurent Museum in Marrakesh, opened on 19 October 2017.

The museum closed 5 May 2025 for renovation and expansion. It will reopen in autumn 2027.

== Collection ==
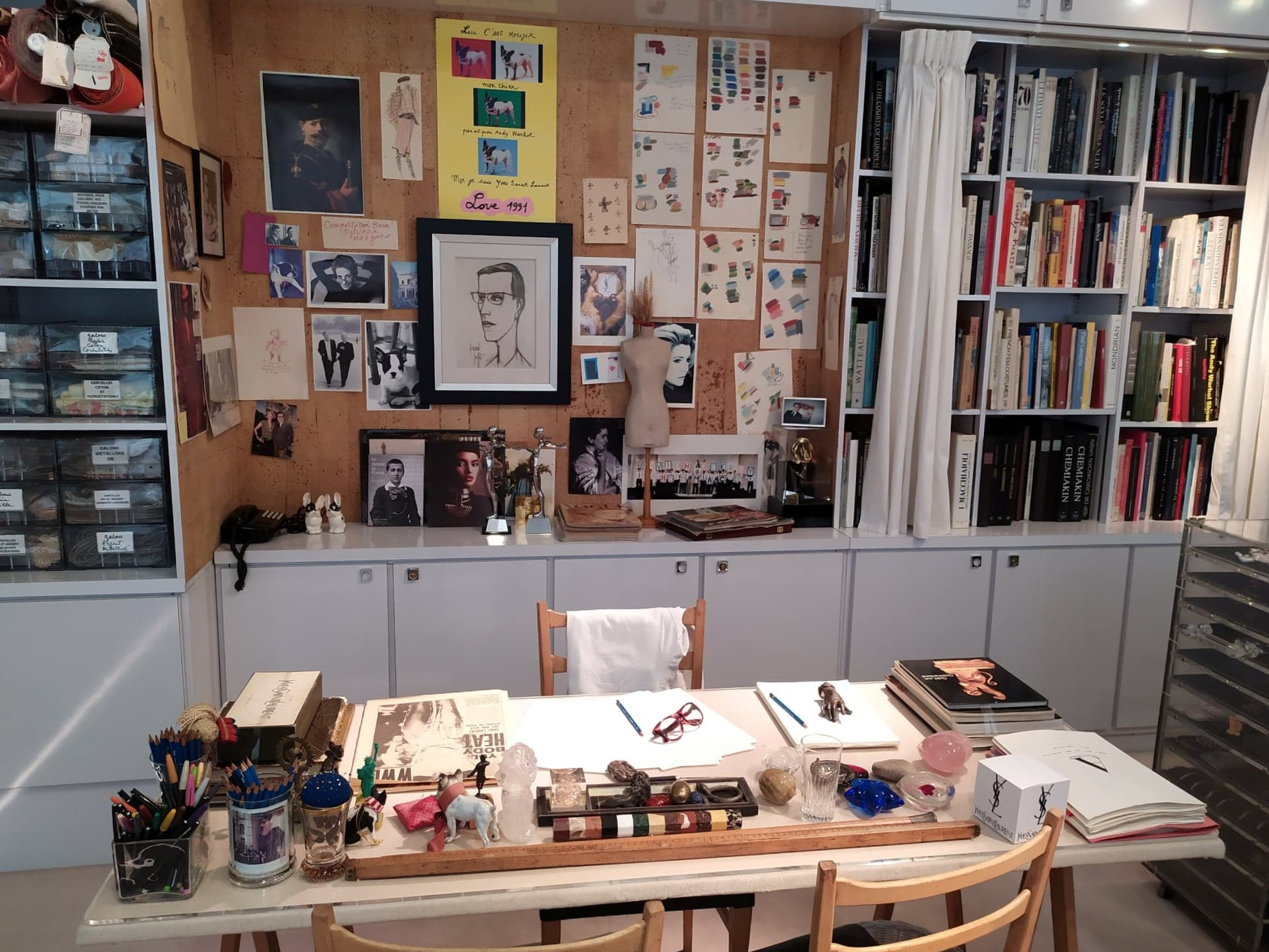
Saint Laurent's preserved studio, where he conceived his collections from 1974 to 2002. A drawing by Bernard Buffet and a photograph of Catherine Deneuve hang on the wall.

The collection includes more than 5,000 haute couture garments and 15,000 accessories from Saint Laurent's 40-year career, along with thousands of sketches, photographs, and archival materials. The 450-square-metre (4,800 sq ft) exhibition space hosts rotating thematic exhibitions.

== See also ==
- Yves Saint Laurent Museum in Marrakesh
- Yves Saint Laurent (fashion house)
