= Yankee Stadium (disambiguation) =

Yankee Stadium can refer to:

- Yankee Stadium, the New York Yankees' current ballpark, opened in 2009
- Yankee Stadium (1923), the New York Yankees' former ballpark, opened in 1923
- 161st Street – Yankee Stadium (New York City Subway), the subway station complex consisting of:
  - 161st Street – Yankee Stadium (IRT Jerome Avenue Line), serving the 4 train
  - 161st Street – Yankee Stadium (IND Concourse Line), serving the B and D trains
- Yankees – East 153rd Street (Metro-North station) on the Hudson line
- Yankee Stadium Legacy, the baseball card compilation
