= Yves Saint Laurent Museum in Marrakesh =

Museum dedicated to the fashion designer Yves Saint Laurent

Yves Saint Laurent Museum in Marrakech
- متحف إيف سان لوران بمراكش; Musée Yves Saint Laurent de Marrakech

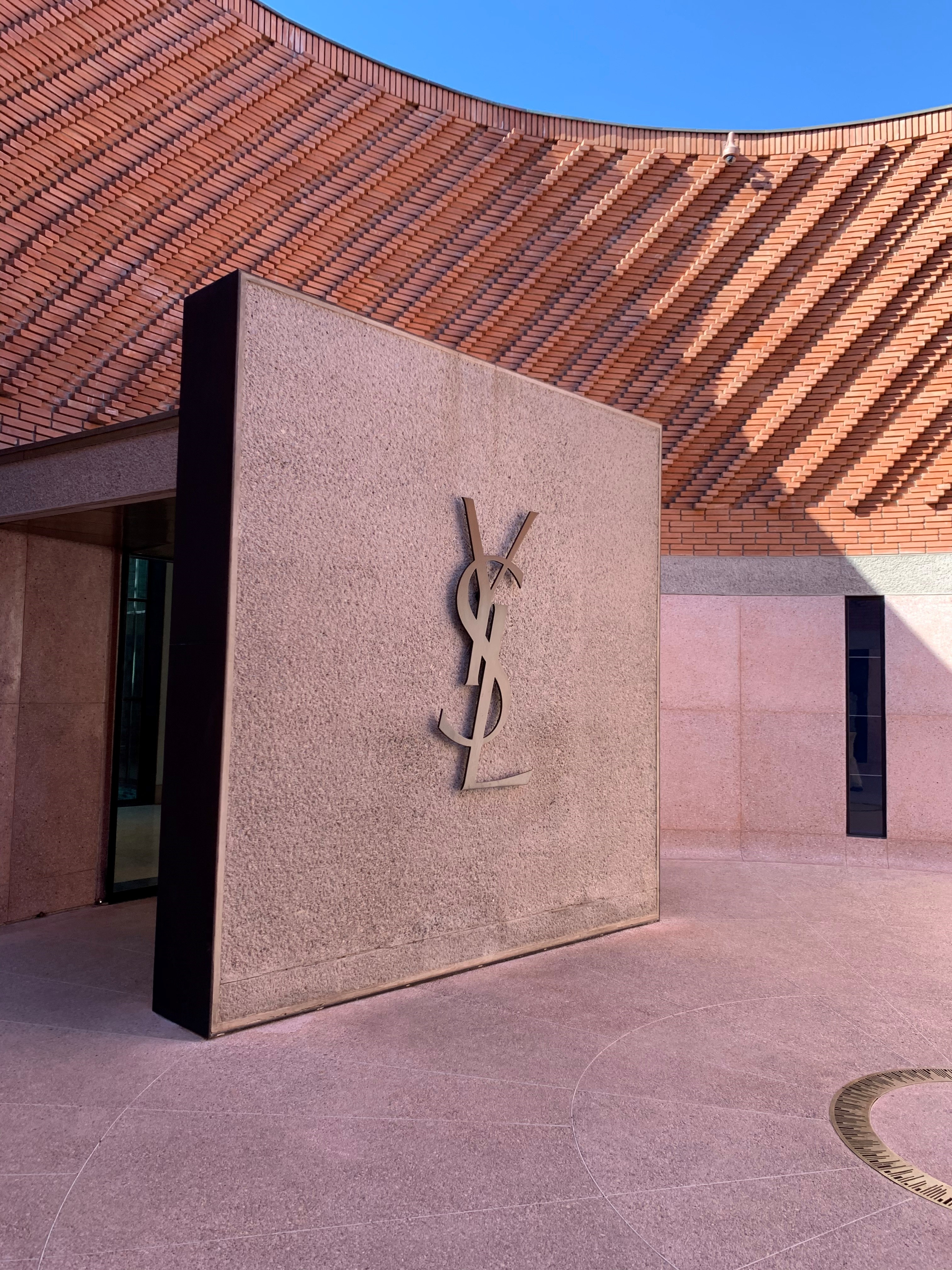
- Interior courtyard
- Established: 19 October 2017
- Location: Yves Saint Laurent Street, Marrakesh, Morocco
- Coordinates: 31°38′34.037″N 8°0′11.308″W
- Architect: Studio KO
- Website: museeyslmarrakech.com/en/

The Yves Saint Laurent Museum in Marrakech (Arabic: متحف إيف سان لوران بمراكش, French: Musée Yves Saint Laurent de Marrakech, stylized mYSLm) is a museum dedicated to the fashion designer Yves Saint Laurent located in Marrakesh, Morocco.

== History ==
Two museums have been established to display the works of Yves Saint Laurent and the collection of the Pierre Bergé - Yves Saint Laurent Foundation: one in Marrakesh and the other at the historic headquarters of the Yves Saint Laurent fashion house in Paris. According to Pierre Bergé, the designer's business partner and onetime life partner, "it was natural to build a museum dedicated to the work of Yves Saint Laurent in Morocco, as he—even in the colors and the forms of his clothing—owes so much to the country." The opening of both museums was organized in 2017.

The museum in Marrakesh was notably financed by an auction of Moroccan works of art, held in the city by Pierre Bergé September 2015.

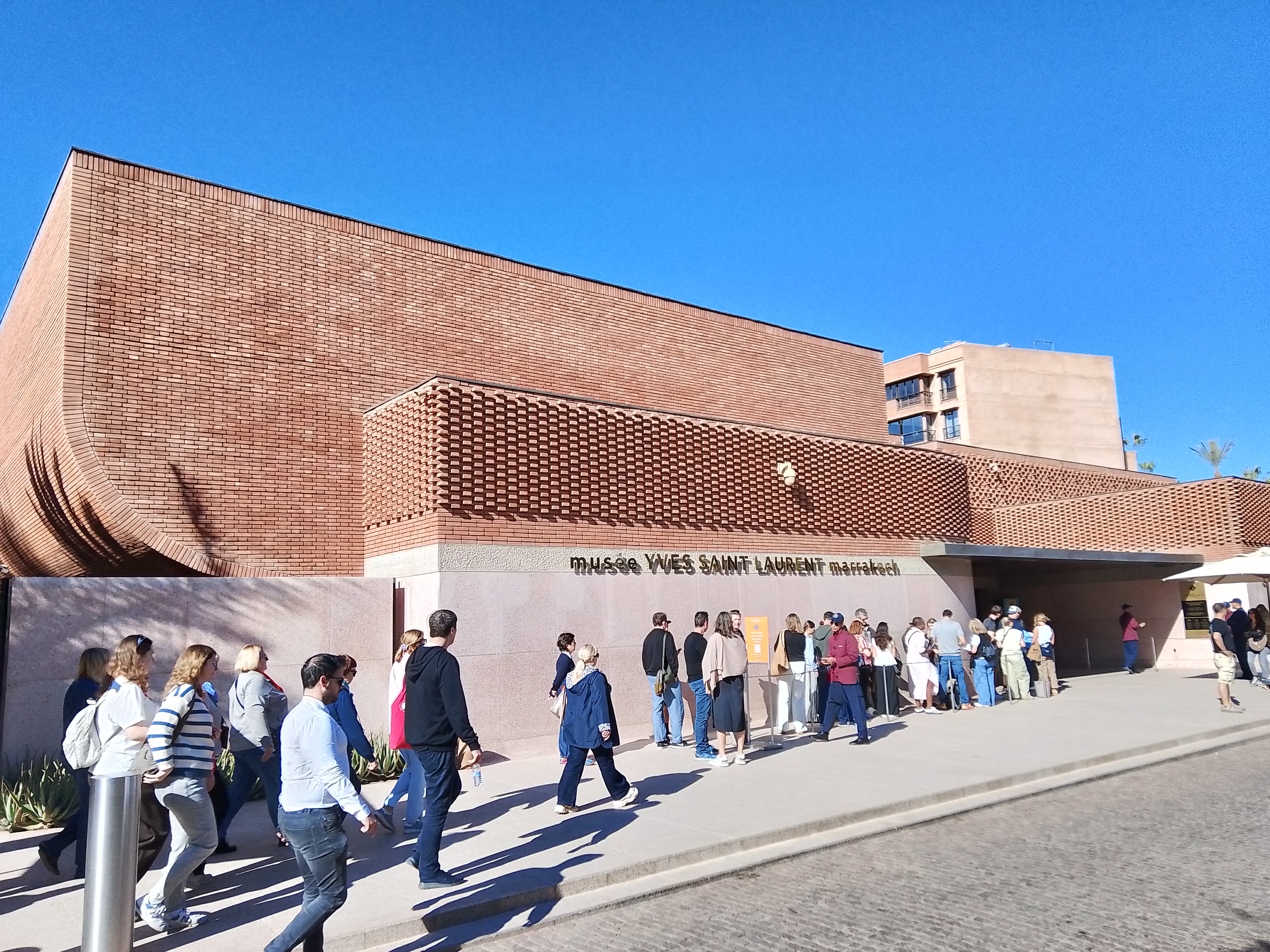
YSL museum by studio ko

It was inaugurated October 2017 and opened to the public 19 October 2017. In January 2018, the museum received the best new public building award at the 2018 Design Awards of the British international design magazine Wallpaper.

== Location ==
This Marrakesh museum is located on a street that had already been named after the designer, Yves Saint Laurent Street, near Majorelle Garden—Saint Laurent's residence in Morocco, transformed since his death into a garden, a Berber Art Museum, and an exhibition space that received more than 700,000 visitors per year.

== Description ==
The museum covers an area of 4,000 m^{2} (43,000 sq ft). It was designed by Studio KO and built by the Moroccan subsidiary of Bouygues.

It includes an exhibition hall featuring the work of Yves Saint Laurent, with photos, videos, sketches, 30,000 accessories, and over 7,000 garments from Saint Laurent's personal collections. Another hall is dedicated to Jacques Majorelle, there are temporary exhibition halls, and holds an auditorium with 130 seats. It also has a gift shop and book store, a café-restaurant with a patio, and a research library with over 5,000 volumes including Andalusi works dating back to the 12th century as well as books on botany, Amazigh art, and the work of Yves Saint Laurent.

From the exterior, the earth-colored building takes the form of an assemblage of cubes and curves, dressed in a lace of bricks evoking weaves of fabric. The materials are terra cotta, concrete, and terrazzo, with colors allowing the building to blend in with its surroundings. The earth bricks were made from Moroccan earth and produced locally. The terrazzo in front and on the ground floor is an aggregate of stone and local marbles.

Art historian Björn Dahlström, a former director of the Berber Art Museum, edited the book Berber Women of Morocco, which was published in conjunction with the 2014/15 exhibition of the same name and shown in Paris, Manama and Rabat. Apart from numerous photographs of Berber women's jewellery, dress and carpets in the museum's collection, the book presents articles about the traditional culture of Berber women in Morocco.

== See also ==
- Musée Yves Saint Laurent Paris
