= Jacques Majorelle =

French painter (1886–1962)

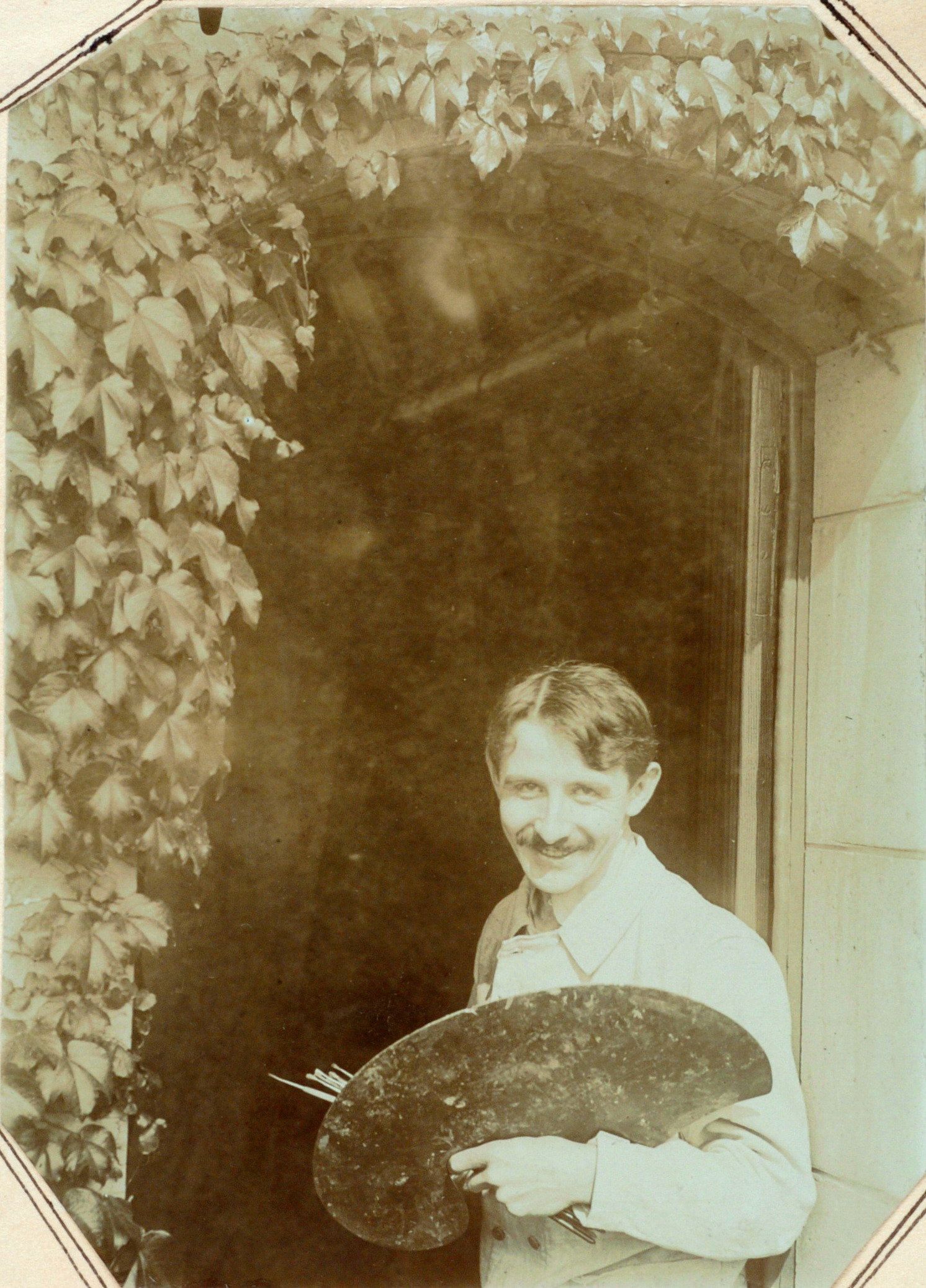
- Born: 7 March 1886; Nancy, France
- Died: 14 October 1962 (aged 76); Paris, France
- Known for: Painting
- Notable work: Majorelle Garden; Majorelle Blue
- Movement: Orientalist, Modernist

Jacques Majorelle (7 March 1886 – 14 October 1962), son of the celebrated Art Nouveau furniture designer Louis Majorelle, was a French painter. He studied at the École des Beaux-Arts in Nancy in 1901 and later at the Académie Julian in Paris with Schommer and Royer. Majorelle became a noted Orientalist painter, but is most remembered for constructing the villa and gardens that now carries his name, the Majorelle Garden in Marrakesh.

== Life and career ==
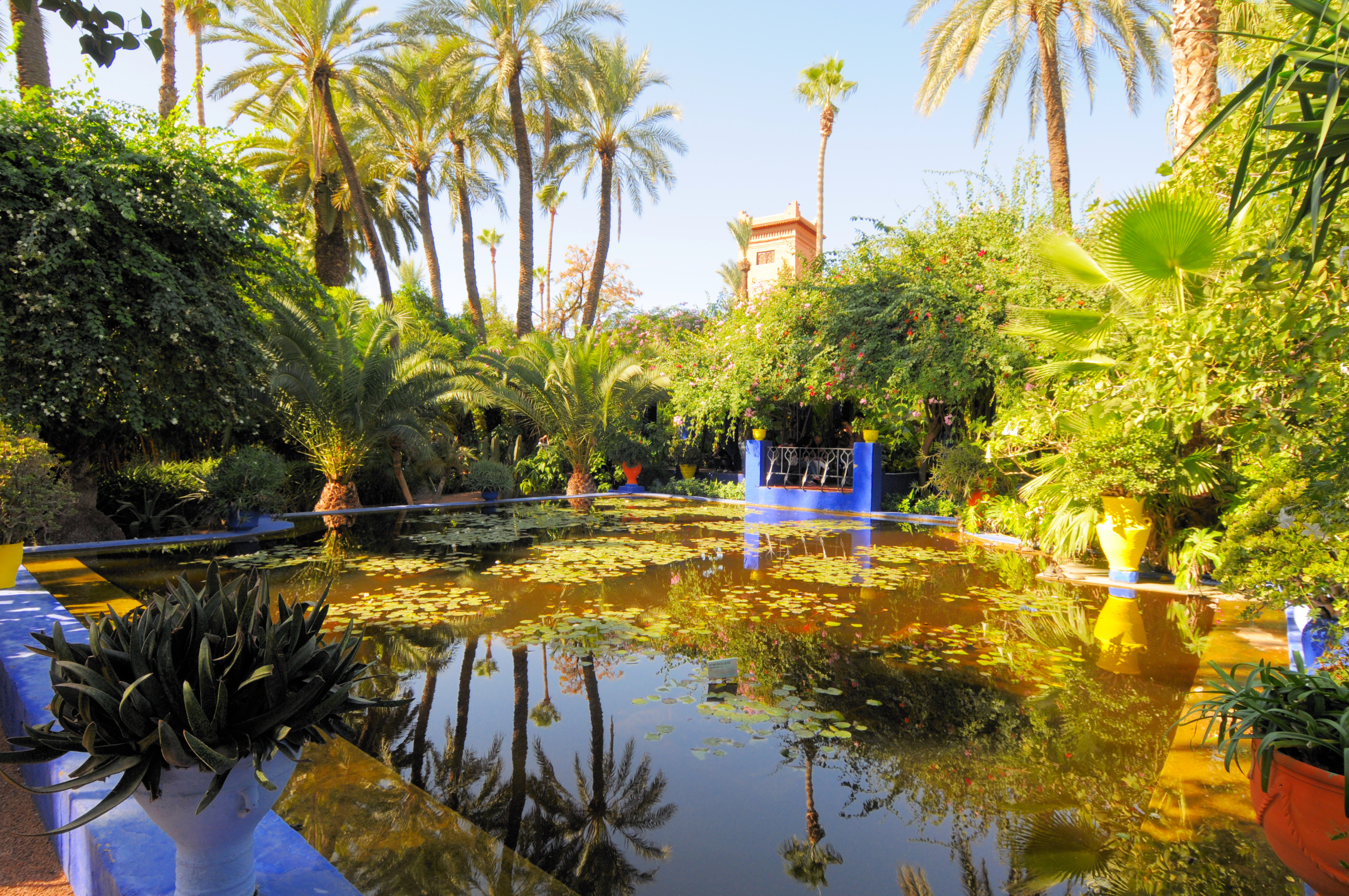
Majorelle Garden

Jacques Majorelle was born in 1886 in Nancy, France. He was the son of a celebrated furniture designer, Louis Majorelle. Jacques' childhood was spent among the draftsmen, cabinetmakers and marquetry inlayers from his father's workshops at a time when the Art Nouveau movement was in its ascendancy. Initially, his father encouraged the young Jacques to study architecture, but after three years he decided to take up his lifelong passion, painting.

Majorelle received his art education at the École des Beaux-Arts in Nancy in 1901 and later at the Académie Julian in Paris with Schommer and Royer. He first exhibited at the Salon de Beaux Artes in 1908. In around 1917 he travelled to Morocco to recover from heart problems and after a short period spent in Casablanca, he visited Marrakesh, where he fell in love with the vibrant colours and quality of light he found there. Initially, he used Marrakech as a base for trips to Spain, Italy and other parts of North Africa, including Egypt. Eventually, however, he settled in Marrakech permanently.

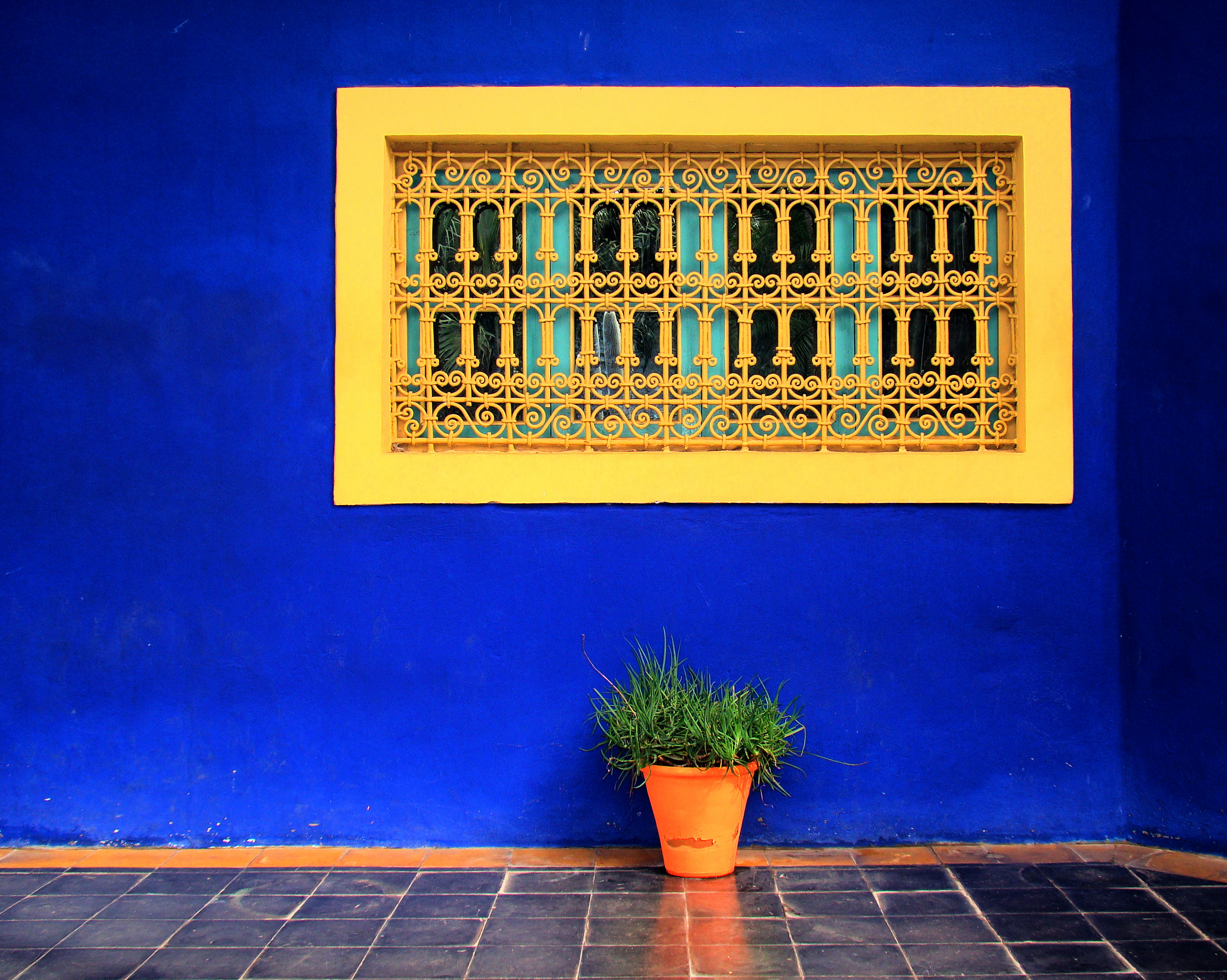
An example of Majorelle Blue from his house in Majorelle Garden in Marrakech, Morocco

He drew inspiration for his paintings from his trips and from Marrakesh itself. His paintings include many street scenes, souks and kasbahs as well as portraits of local inhabitants. He opened a handicrafts workshop in Marrakech and also designed posters to promote travel to Morocco. His work was profoundly affected by his voyage to Morocco and Marrakesh. He introduced a more coloured vision, bathed in light where the drawing disappears and the image emerges from large spots of colour laid flat. It seemed as if he had discovered the sun in these countries. His style exhibited more freedom and spontaneity.

In 1919, he married Andrée Longueville and the pair lived in an apartment near the Jemâa el-Fna Square (then at the palace of Pasha Ben Daoud). In 1923, Jacques Majorelle bought a four-acre plot, situated on the border of a palm grove in Marrakech and began planting a luxuriant garden which would become known as the Jardins Majorelle or Majorelle Garden. Initially, he built a house in the Mooroccan style, but in 1931 he commissioned the architect, Paul Sinoir, to design a Cubist villa within the grounds. In 1937, he painted the villa in a special shade of the blue which Majorelle had developed after being inspired by the blue tiles prevalent in southern Morocco. This colour was used extensively in Majorelle's house and garden, and now carries his name; Majorelle Blue. He gradually purchased additional land, extending his holding by almost 10 acres. He continued to work on the garden for almost forty years and it is said to be his finest work.

The garden proved costly to run, and in 1947 Majorelle opened the garden to the public with an admission fee designed to defray the cost of maintenance. He sold the house and land in the 1950s, after which it fell into disrepair. It was rediscovered in the 1980s, by designers Yves Saint-Laurent and Pierre Bergé who set about restoring it and saving it. Yves Saint-Laurent and Pierre Bergé, who were keen art collectors, also began acquiring paintings by Majorelle. Yves Saint Laurent died in 2008 and his ashes were scattered in the gardens.

Majorelle was sent to France for medical treatment in 1962 following a car accident, and died in Paris later that year of complications from his injuries. He is buried in Nancy, the place of his birth, alongside his father.

== Legacy ==
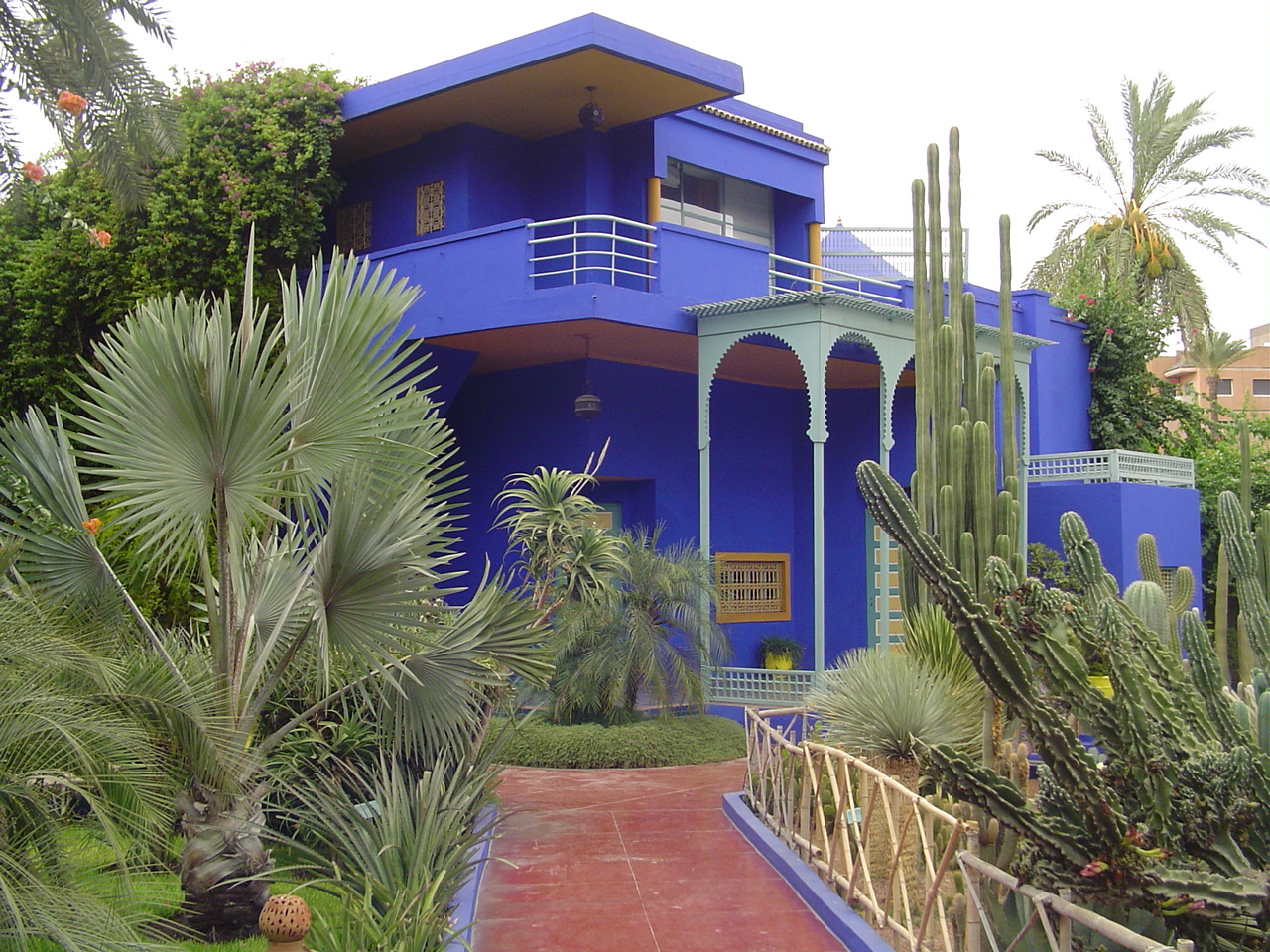
Artist's blue villa in the Majorelle Garden

His life and work have been subject of a book, namely:

- Marcilhac, F., La Vie et l'oeuvre de Jacques Majorelle, [volume 7 in the series, Les Orientalistes], Paris, ACR edition, 1988

== Work ==
Majorelle is recognised as one of the early modernist Orientalists. During his lifetime, many of Majorelle's paintings were sold to private buyers and remain in private collections. Some of his early works can be found in museums around his birthplace such as the Musee de l'Ecole de Nancy. Examples of his later work can be seen in the Mamounia Hotel, Marrakesh, the French Consulate of Marrakech, and in the Villa at the Majorelle Gardens.

=== Publications ===
- Road Trip Diary of a Painter in the Atlas and the Anti-Atlas, 1922

=== Select list of paintings ===
- Souk el Khérais n.d. (Shafik Gabr Private Collection)
- Souq El Khémis, n.d.
- Souk à Marrakech n.d.
- Souk Couvert, n.d.
- Scène de souk, Marrakech n.d.
- Le Marché aux Dattes, n.d.
- Kasbah Tagoundaft, 1922
- La Kasbah Rouge n.d.
- Les Kasbahs de l'Atlas, n.d.
- Kasbah Ouarzazate, n.d.
- Marchandes de Pastèques et d'Oranges Tanger, n.d.
- Effet de Clari-Obscur dans le Souk à Marrakech n.d.
- Aït ben Addou, 1929
- Portrait d'Egyptien, n.d.
- Danseuses marocaines à Télouet, n.d.
- Les Couvertures Noires, Marrakech, n.d.
- Dans les Palmeraies, n.d.
- Vue des Souks, n.d.
- Fête Maroc, n.d.
- Un Coin de Souk à Marrakech, n.d.
- Place à Marrakech, n.d.
- Scène de Village à Marg en Egypte, n.d.
- Marché à Macenta, Guinée, 1952
- Le souk de Marrakech, 1957
- Mere et enfant d'Afrique Noire

== See also ==
- List of Orientalist artists
- Orientalism
- Villa Majorelle
