= Majorelle Blue =

Shade of blue trademarked by French artist Jacques Majorelle

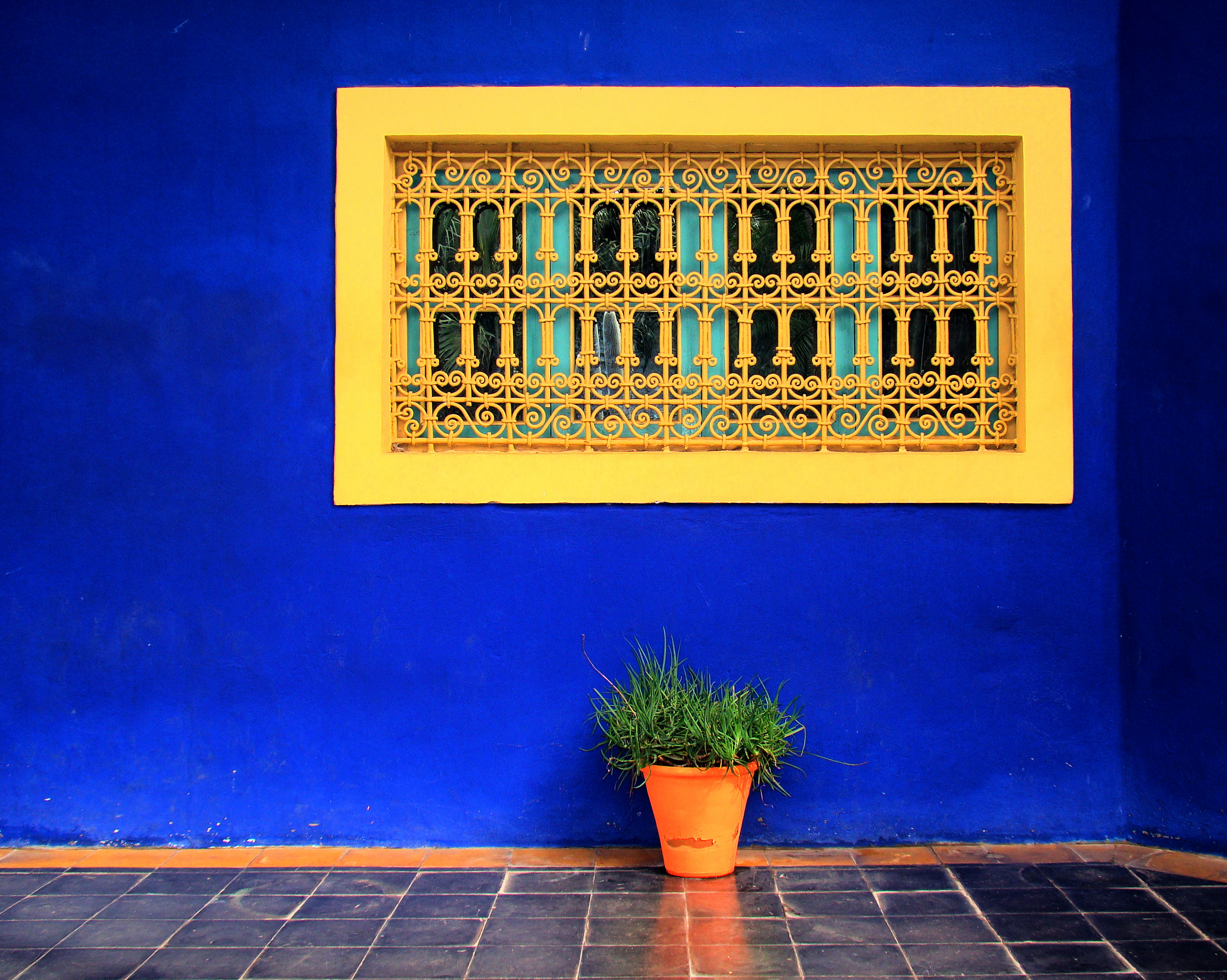
Majorelle Garden, Marrakesh

Majorelle Blue is a clear, intense, fresh shade of deep blue.

In 1924, the French artist Jacques Majorelle constructed his largest artwork, the Majorelle Garden in Marrakesh, Morocco, and painted the garden walls, fountains, features and villa this very intense shade of blue, for which he trademarked the name Majorelle Blue. He had noticed the colour in Moroccan tiles, in Berber burnouses, and around the windows of buildings such as kasbahs and native adobe homes.

== See also ==
Majorelle Blue
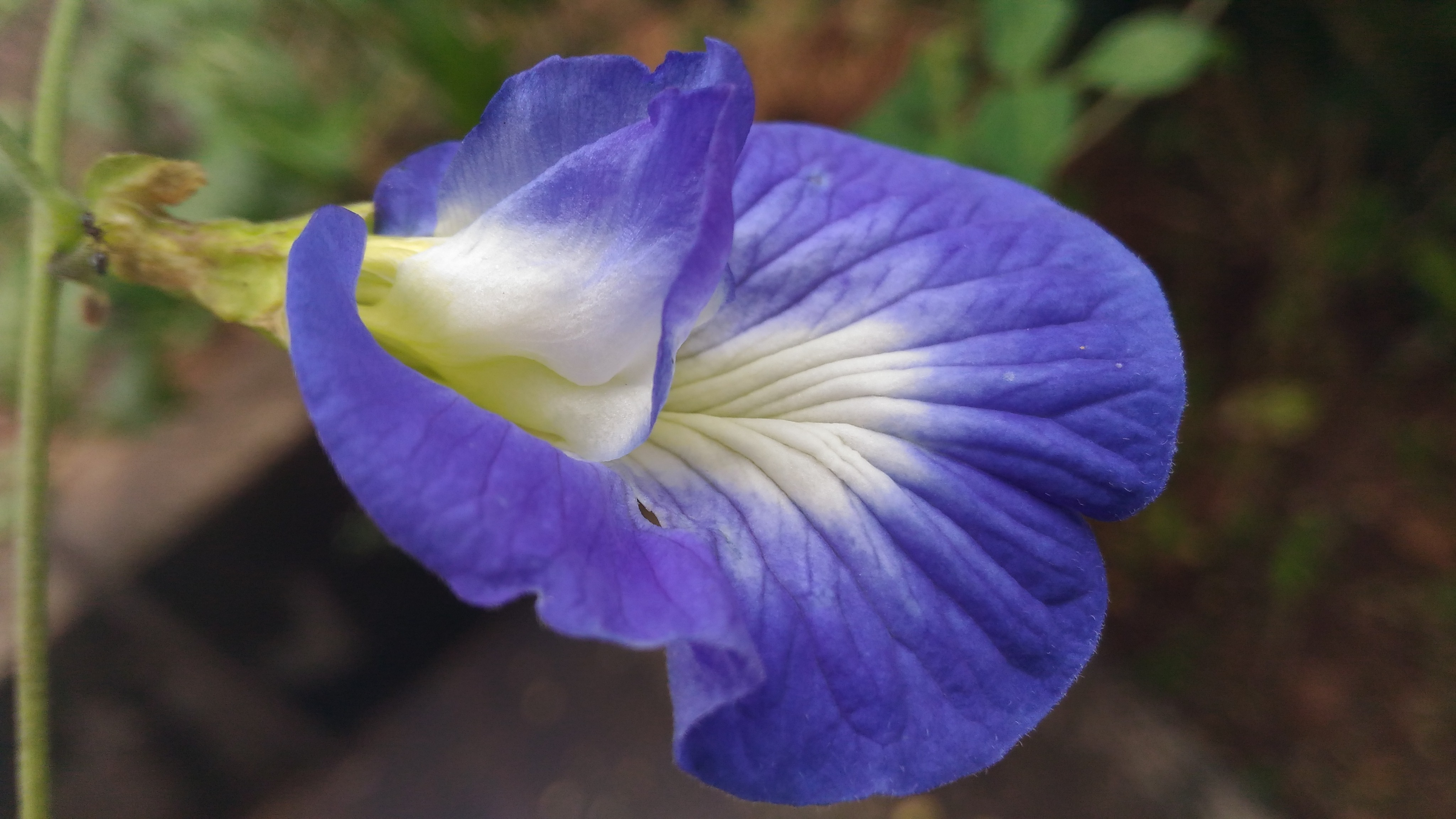
- Clitoria ternatea flower with Majorelle Blue coloration

Color coordinates
- Hex triplet: #6050DC
- sRGB^{B} (r, g, b): (96, 80, 220)
- HSV (h, s, v): (247°, 64%, 86%)
- CIELCh_{uv} (L, C, h): (43, 106, 268°)
- Source: ColorHexa
- B: Normalized to [0–255] (byte)

- List of colours
