= Majorelle Garden =

- Jardin Majorelle
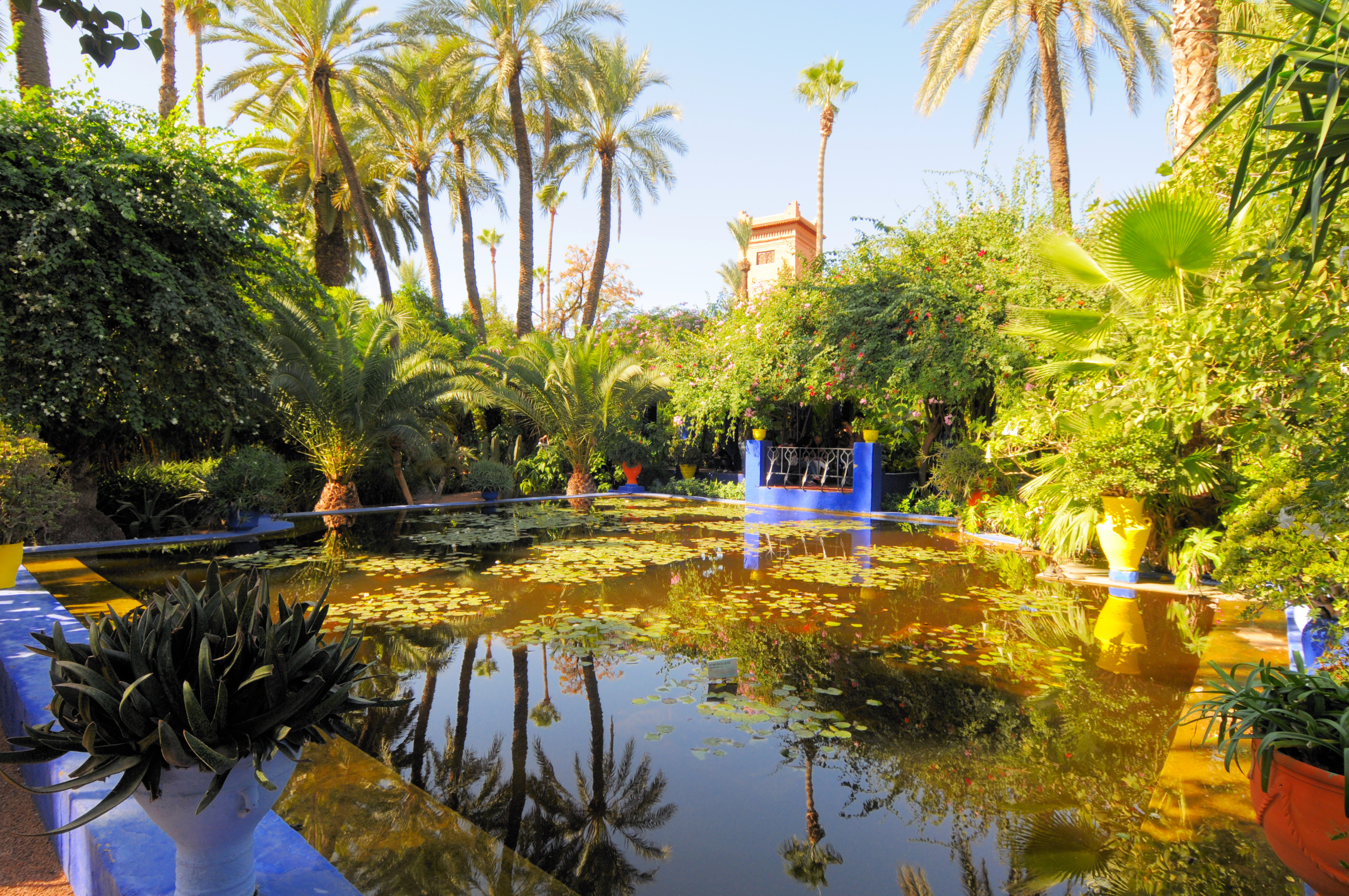
- Majorelle Garden
- Established: 1923
- Location: Rue Yves Saint Laurent, Gueliz, 40090 Marrakesh, Morocco
- Coordinates: 31°38′34″N 8°00′11″W
- Type: Art museum, garden
- Key holdings: Berber Museum, Musée Yves Saint Laurent
- Collections: Berber art, Islamic art, Haute couture
- Founder: Jacques Majorelle
- Website: www.jardinmajorelle.com/en/

The Majorelle Garden (French: Jardin Majorelle; Arabic: حديقة ماجوريل, romanized: hadiqat mmajuril; Berber languages: ⵓⵔⵜⵉ ⵎⴰⵊⵓⵔⵉⵍ, romanized: urti majuril) is a one-hectare (two-acre) botanical garden and artist's landscape garden in Marrakesh, Morocco. It was created by the French Orientalist artist Jacques Majorelle over almost forty years, starting in 1923, and features a Cubist villa designed by French architect Paul Sinoir in the 1930s. The property was the residence of the artist and his wife from 1923 until their divorce in the 1950s.

In the 1980s, the property was purchased by the fashion designer Yves Saint-Laurent and his business manager Pierre Bergé who worked to restore it. Today, the garden and villa complex is open to the public. The villa houses the Berber Museum and in 2017 the Yves Saint Laurent Museum opened nearby.

== History ==
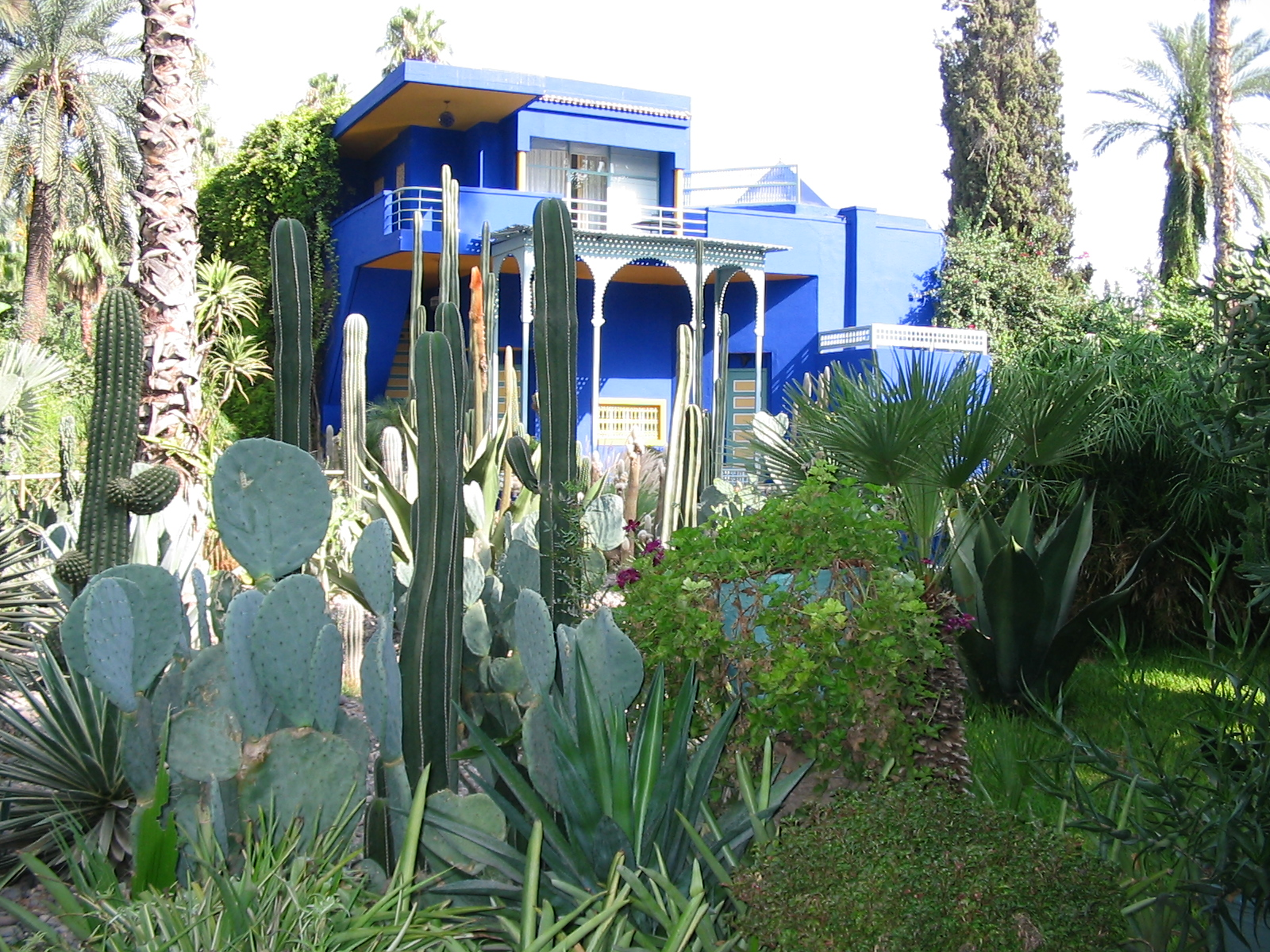
Majorelle Garden's cactus collection, with Villa in the background

The Majorelle Garden was designed by the French artist, Jacques Majorelle (1886–1962), son of the Art Nouveau ébéniste (cabinet-maker) of Nancy, Louis Majorelle. As a young aspiring painter, Jacques Majorelle was sent to Morocco in around 1917 to convalesce from a serious medical condition. After spending a short time in Casablanca, he travelled to Marrakech and like many of his contemporaries, fell in love with the vibrant colours and street life he found there. After travelling around North Africa and the Mediterranean, he eventually decided to settle permanently in Marrakech.

During his lifetime, Majorelle earned a reputation as a celebrated Orientalist painter. The special shade of bold cobalt blue, inspired by the coloured tiles he had seen around Marrakech and in Berber burnouses, was used extensively in the garden and its buildings and is named after him, bleu Majorelle—Majorelle Blue. Prior to his death, Majorelle patented the colour which carries his name.

In 1923, just four years after his marriage to Andrée Longueville, Majorelle purchased a four-acre plot, situated on the border of a palm grove in Marrakech and built a house in the Mooroccan style. In 1931, he commissioned the architect, Paul Sinoir, to design a Cubist villa for the property. Gradually, he purchased additional land, extending his holding by some 10 acres. In the grounds around the residence, Majorelle began planting a luxuriant garden which would become known as the Jardins Majorelle (Majorelle Garden). The garden became his life's work and he devoted himself to developing it for almost forty years.

The garden proved costly to run and in 1947, Majorelle opened the garden to the public with an admission fee designed to defray the cost of maintenance. At times, he sold off parcels of land to fund the growing garden. Following his divorce in the 1950s, Majorelle was forced to sell the house and land. After this, the garden was neglected and fell into disrepair. The garden and villa were rediscovered in the 1980s, by fashion designers, Yves Saint-Laurent and Pierre Bergé who set about restoring it and saving it. The pair owned the villa until 2008. After Yves Saint Laurent died in 2008 his ashes were scattered in the Majorelle Garden.

Since 2010, the property has been owned by the Foundation Pierre Bergé – Yves Saint Laurent, a French not-for-profit organisation and since 2011 has been managed by the Foundation Jardin Majorelle, a recognized non-profit organization in Marrakech. Pierre Bergé was the director of the Garden's Foundation until his death in September, 2017.

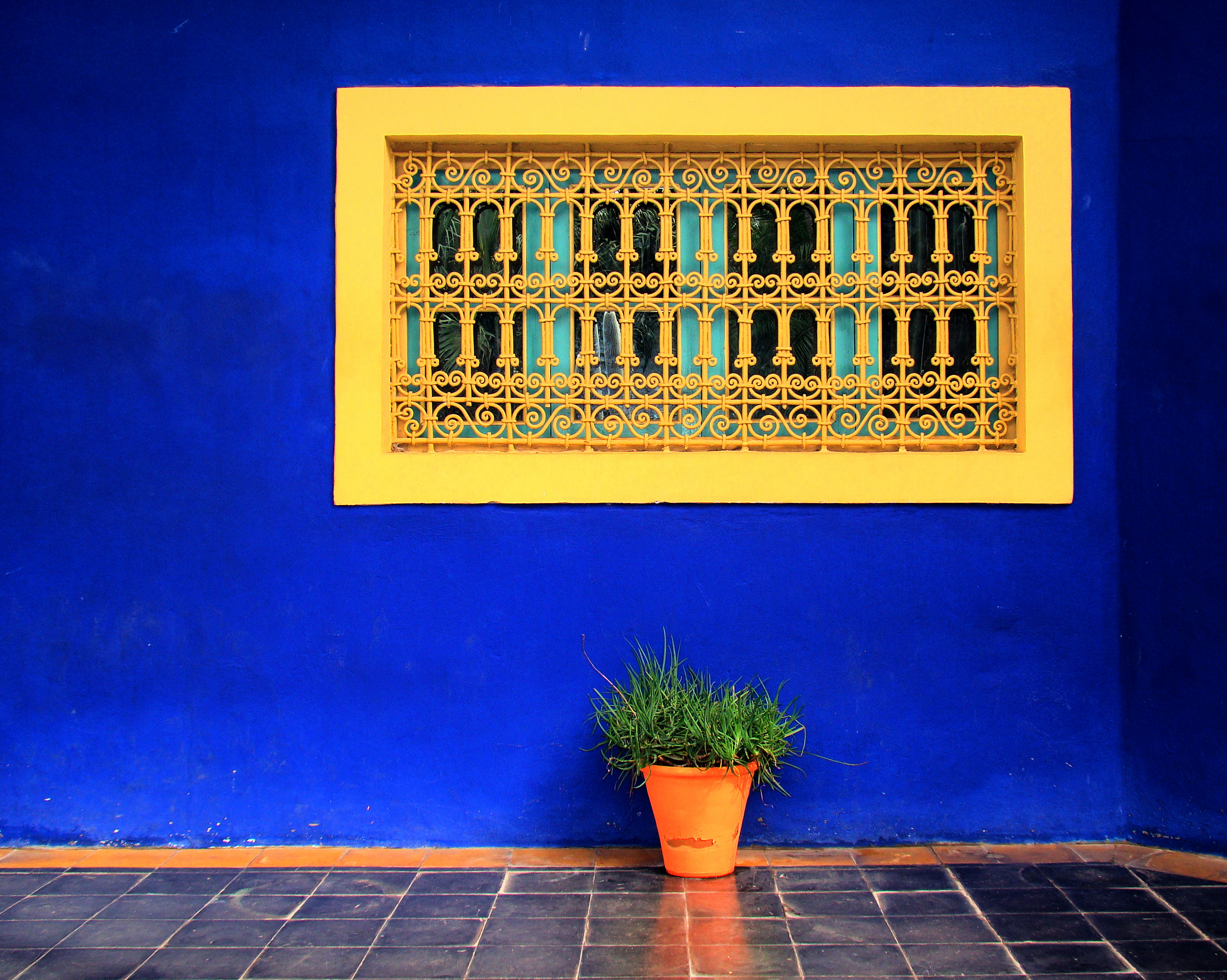
An example of Majorelle Blue from the house in the garden

== Gardens and museums ==
The gardens and buildings form a complex, where specific buildings are dedicated to various museums and exhibits of interest to visitors. The gardens, which cover two and half acres, are open to the public daily and house an important collection of cacti and sculptures.

Majorelle's former studio workshop previously housed the Islamic Art Museum of Marrakech, featuring a collection of North African textiles from Saint-Laurent's personal collection as well as ceramics and jewelry. Since 2011, however, the villa is now home to the Berber Museum (Musée Pierre Bergé des Arts Berbères), exhibiting objects of Amazigh (Berber) culture. The villa also holds a collection of Majorelle's paintings.

Development of the garden complex is ongoing. Profits from the gardens are used to fund new projects. In October 2017, the Yves Saint Laurent Museum was opened to the public as a tribute to the designer's legacy and his links with Marrakech. The gardens are a major tourist drawcard in Marrakech, attracting more than 700,000 visitors annually. The garden hosts more than 15 bird species that are endemic to North Africa. It has many fountains, and a notable collection of cacti.

== Gallery ==
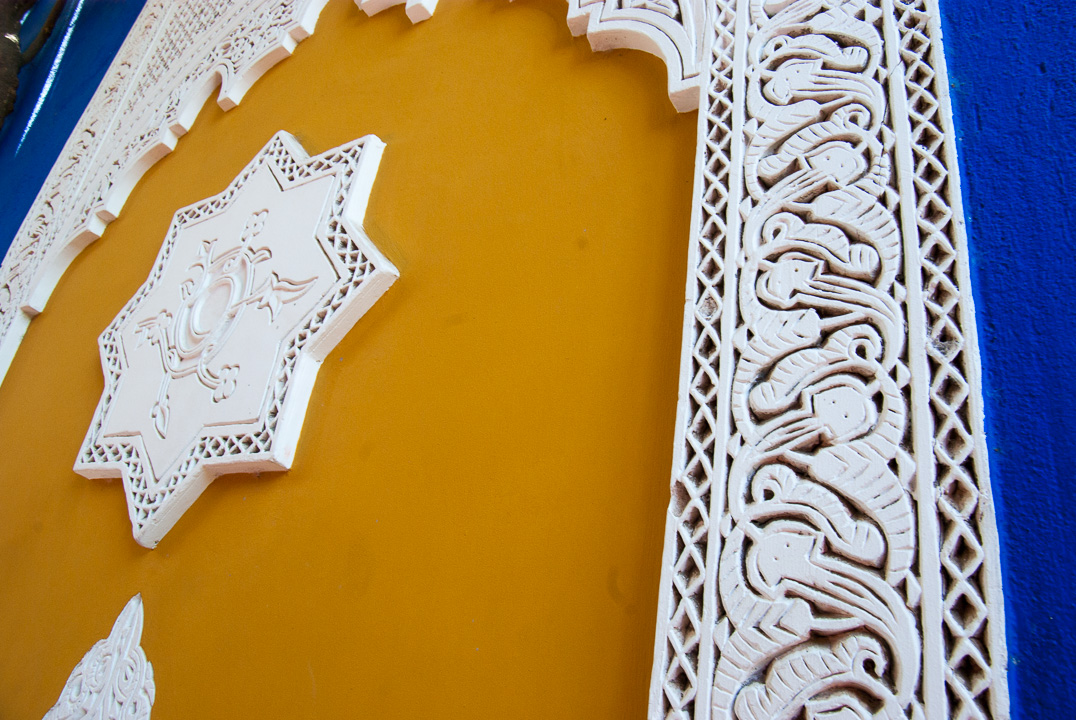

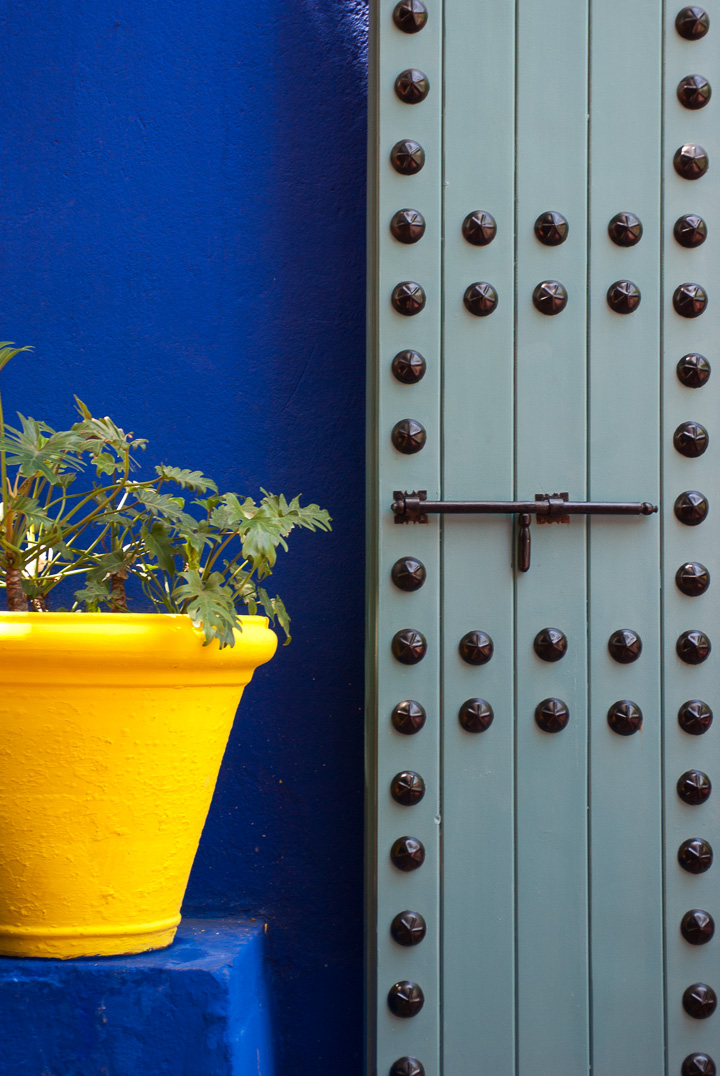

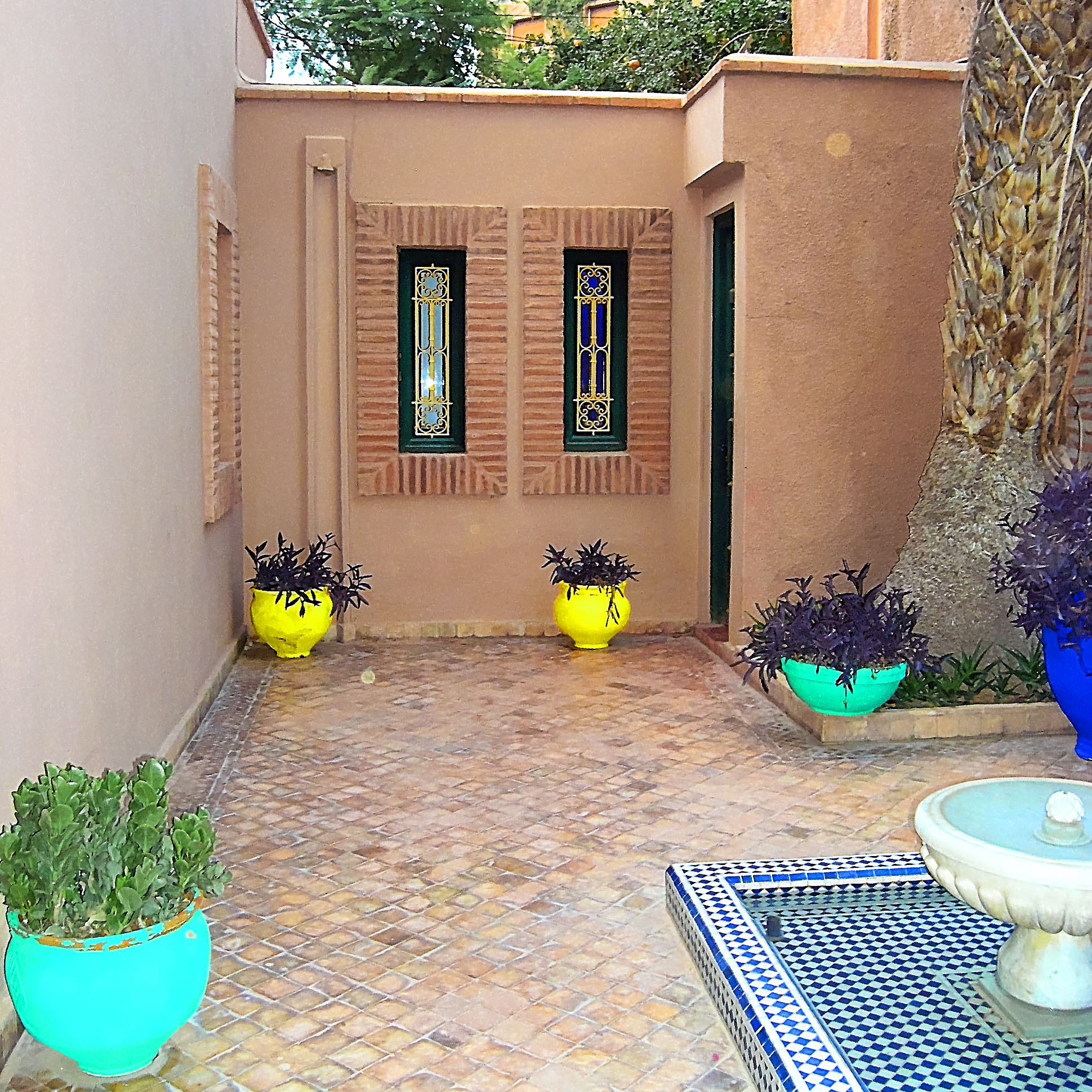

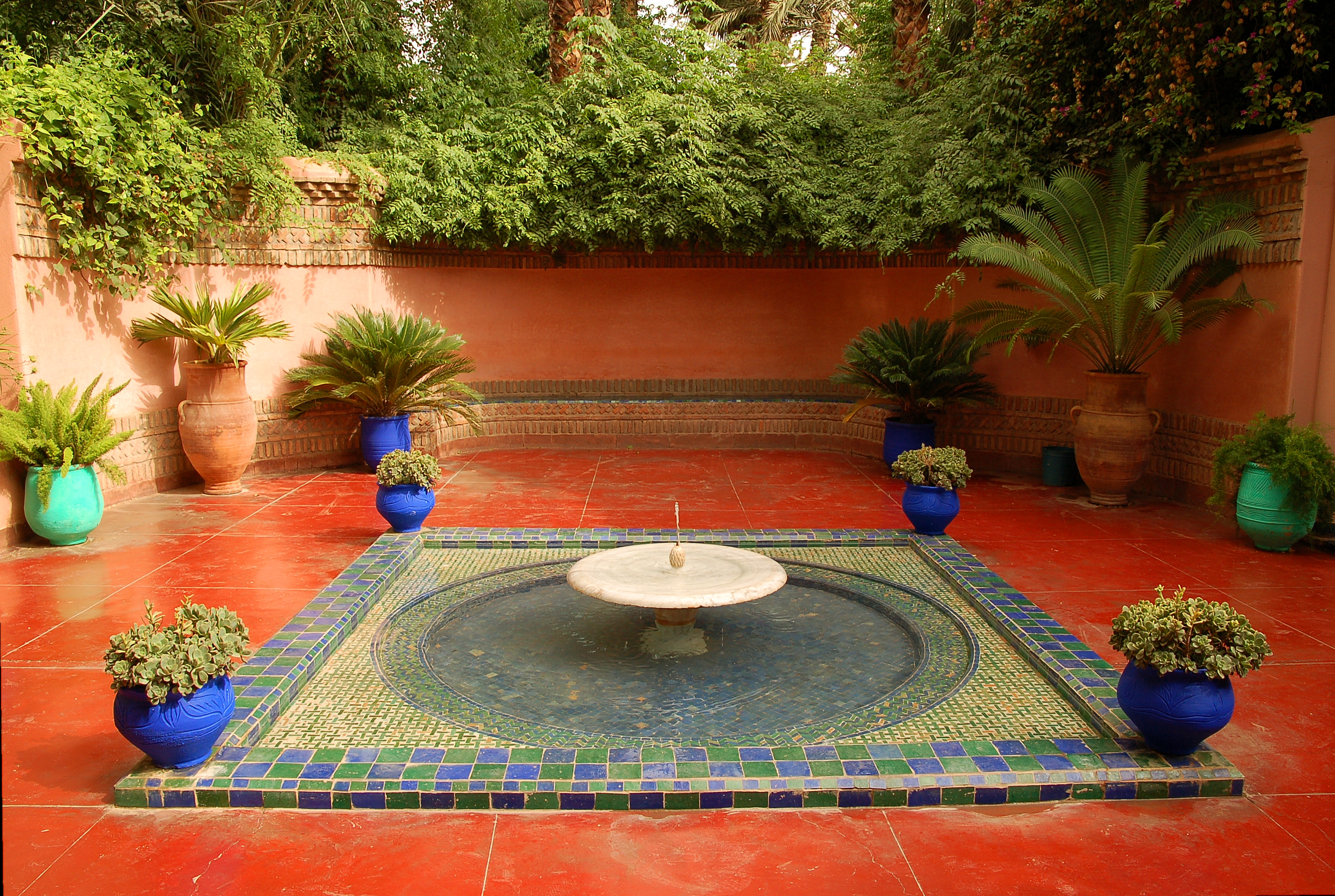

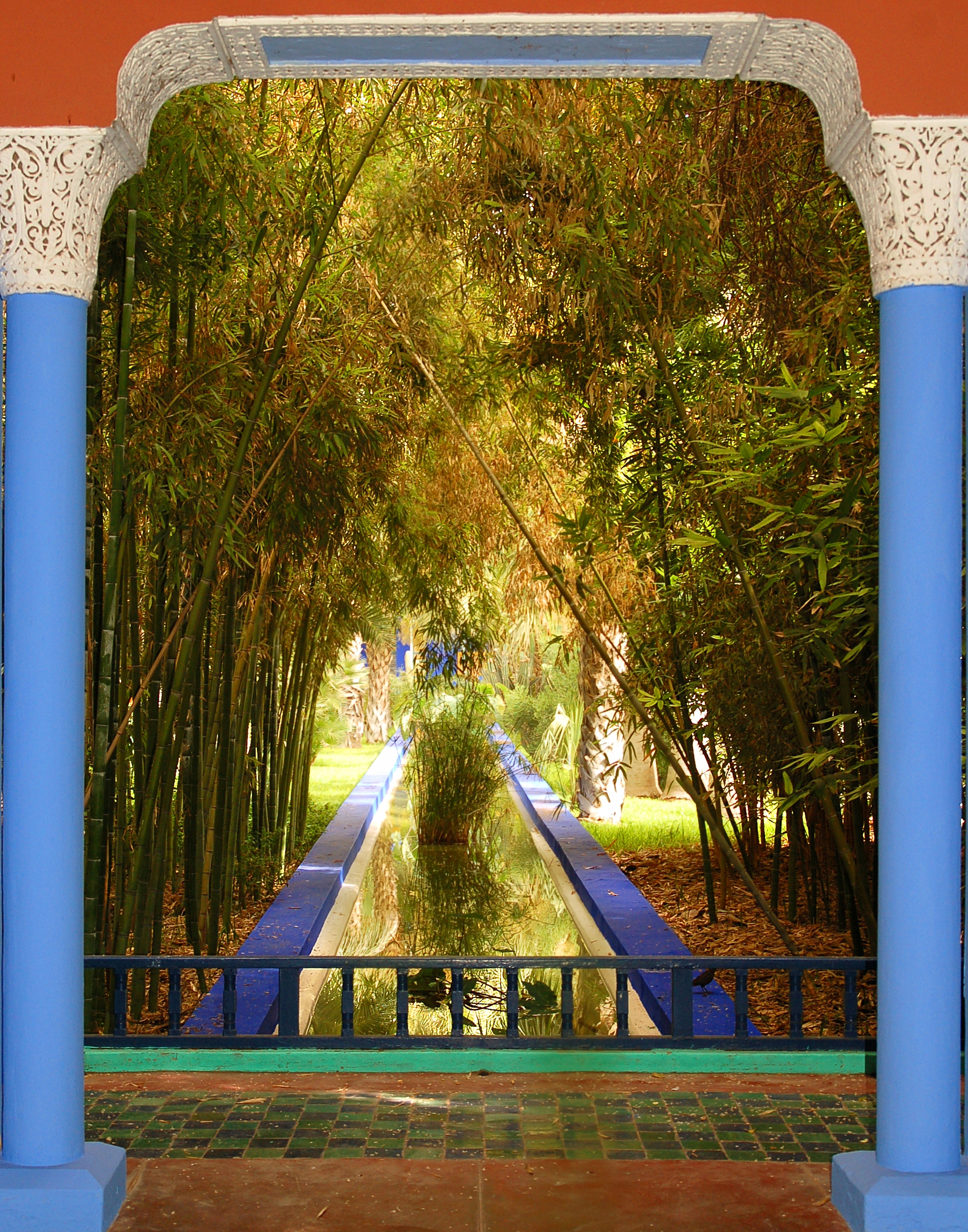

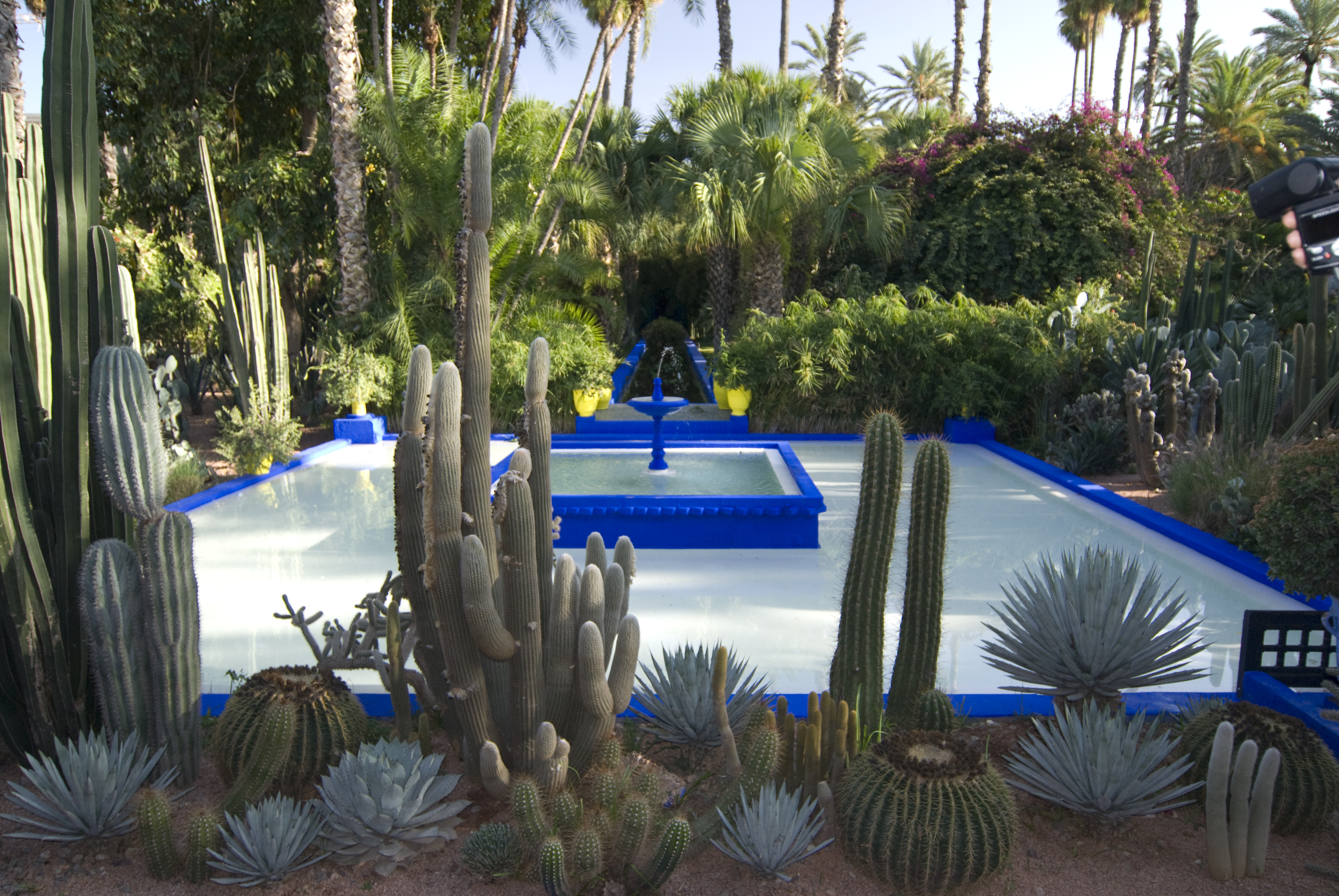

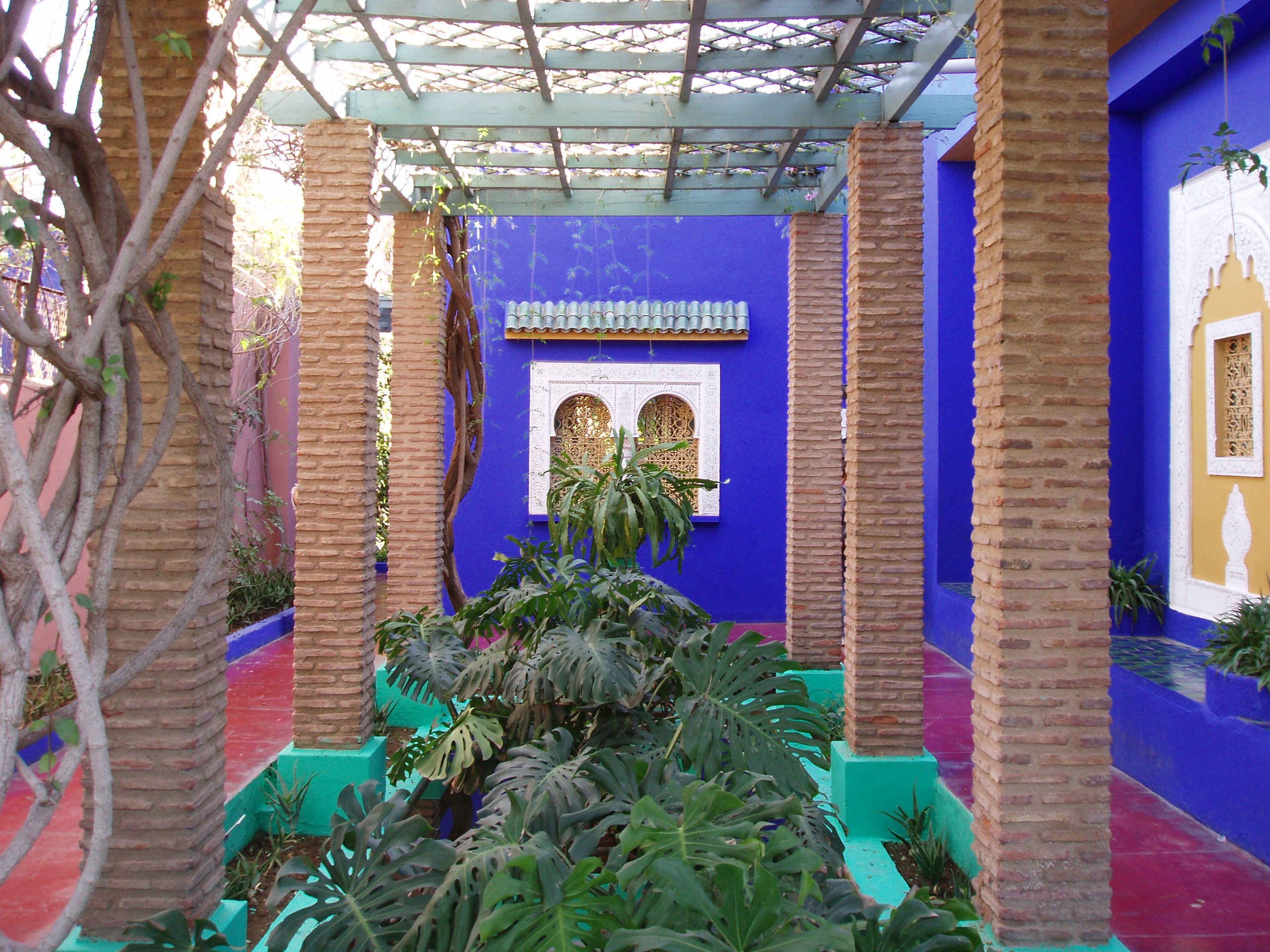

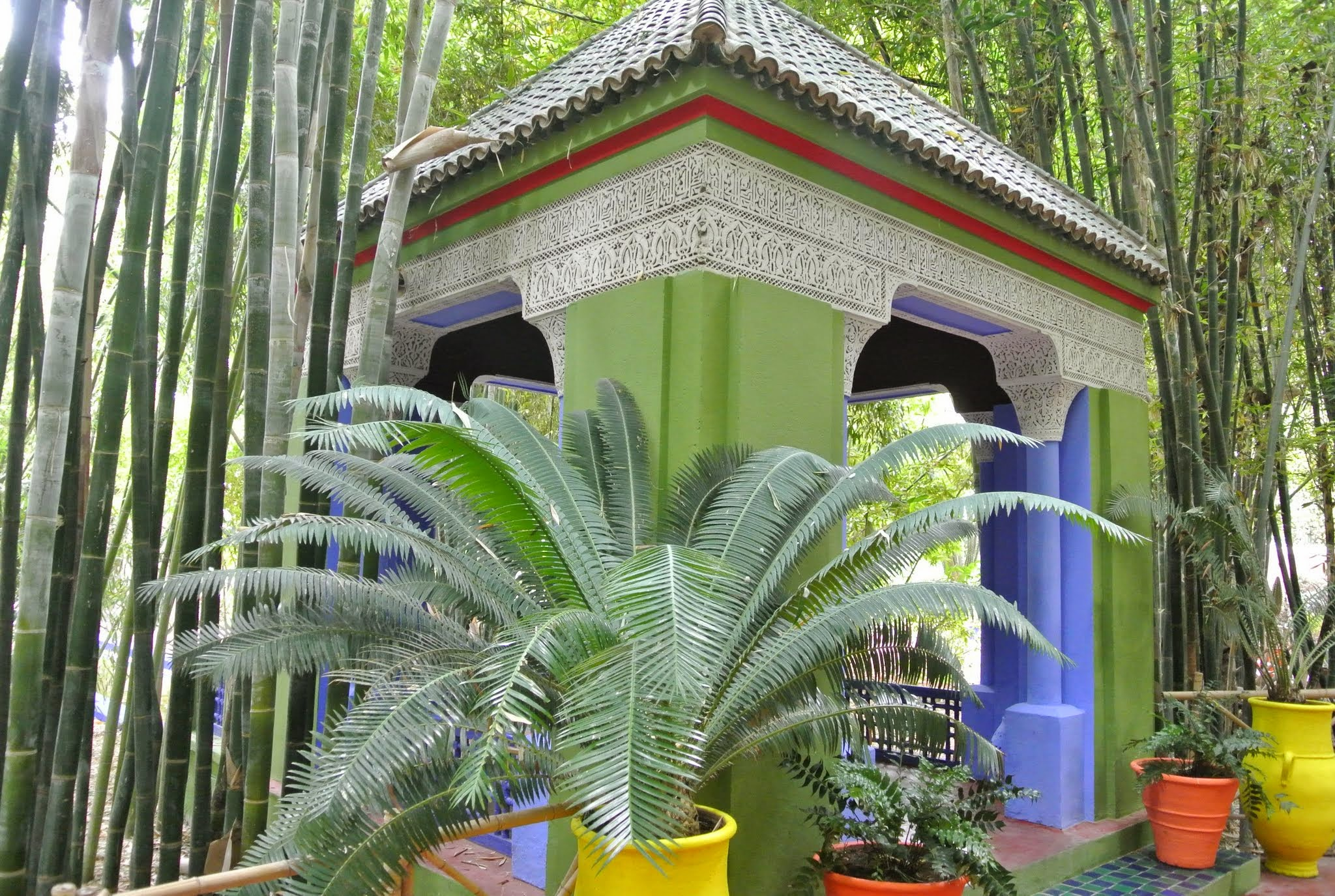

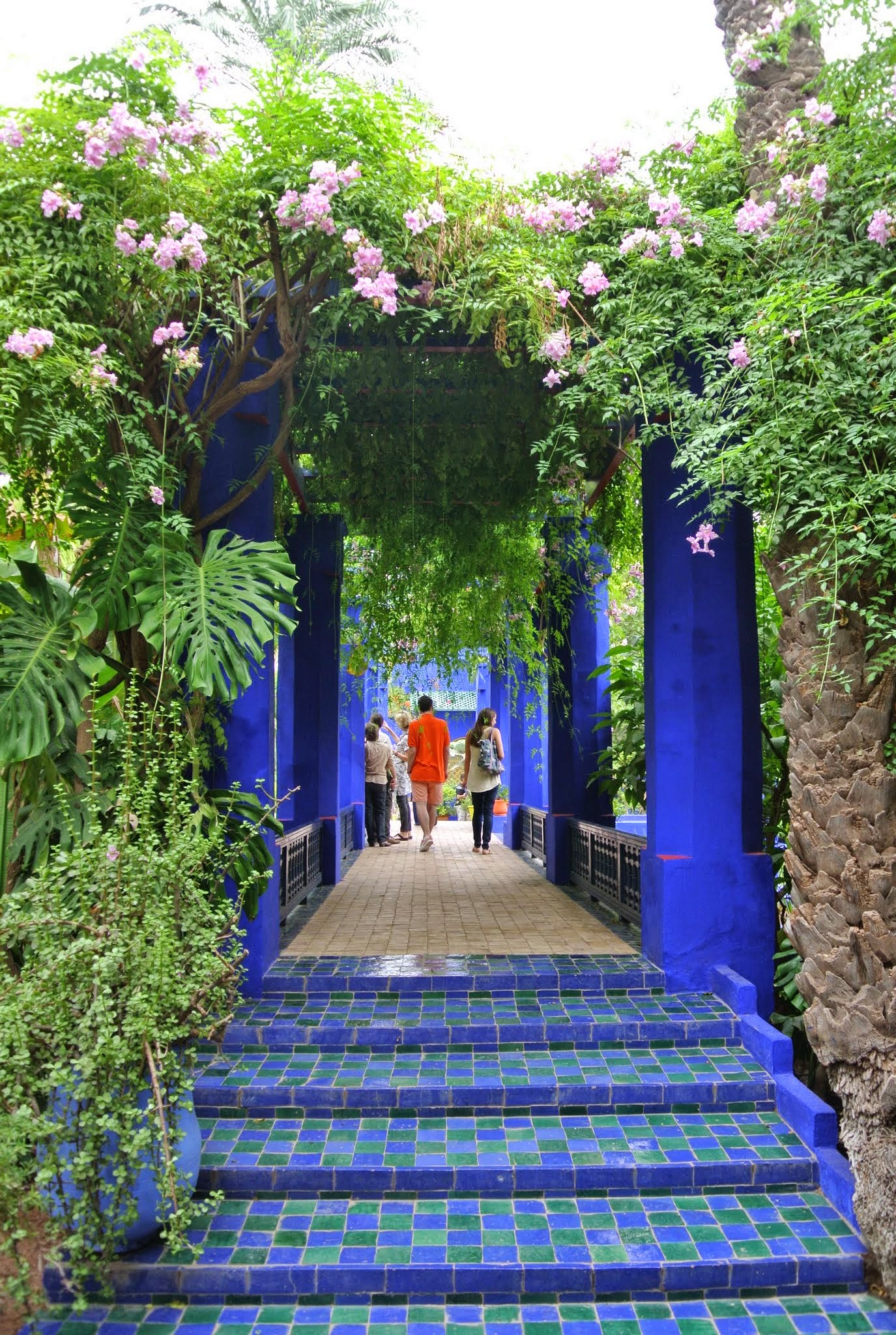

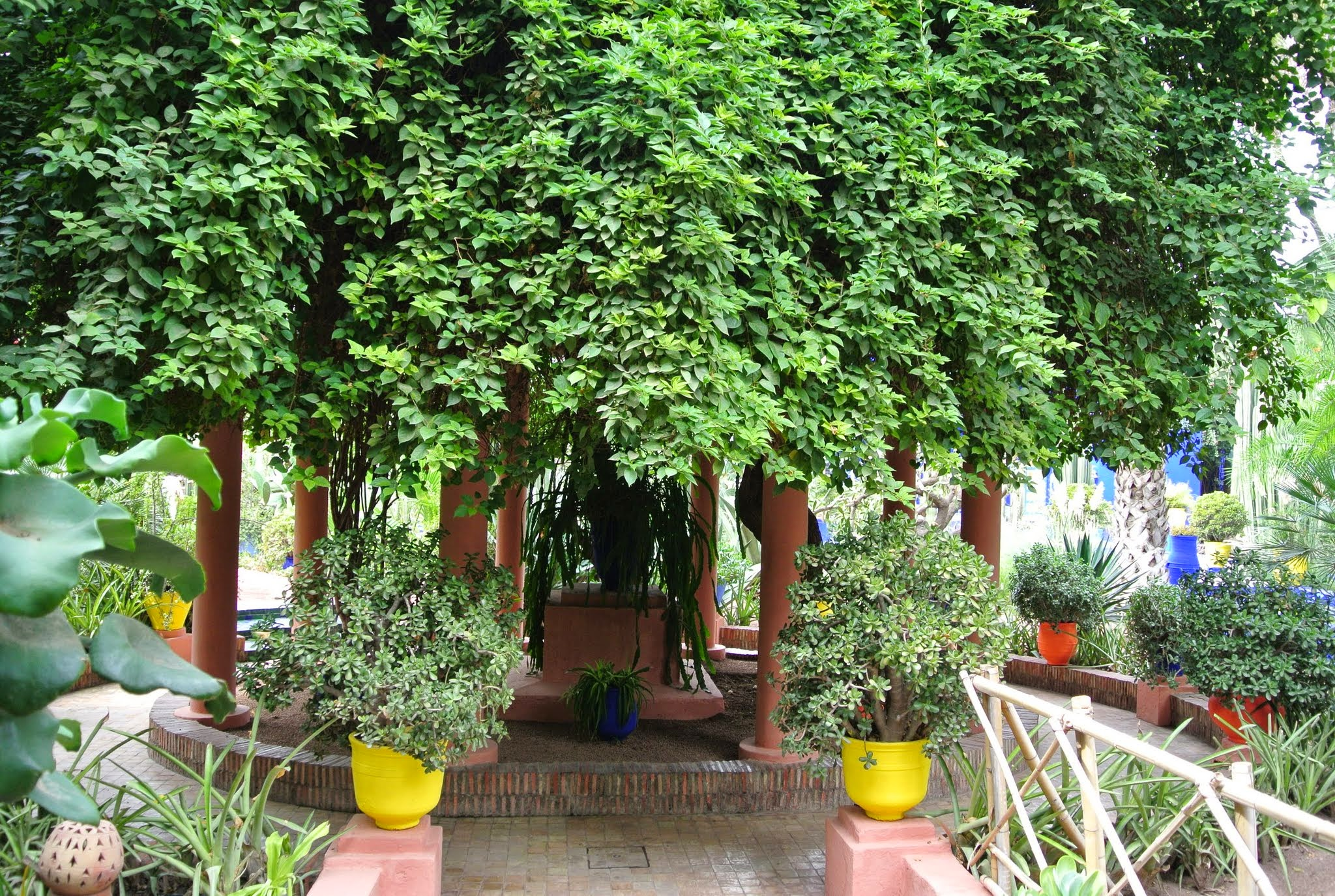
