= Yankee Stadium Legacy =

Set of trading cards

- Type: Trading cards
- Company: Upper Deck
- Country: United States
- Availability: 2008–2008
- Features: New York Yankees players Sports events at Yankee Stadium

The Yankee Stadium Legacy set is a 6,752-card compilation chronicling every single game the New York Yankees ever played at the original Yankee Stadium since April 18, 1923. The card set was manufactured by Upper Deck and made its official debut by being randomly inserted into packs of Upper Deck's 2008 Series 1 Baseball.

As part of a promotion related to the set, the first five collectors who completed the set of all 6,661 cards inserted into 2008 Upper Deck Baseball products, were to travel to New York during the 2009 New York Yankees season to attend a game at the new Yankee Stadium and meet Yankee Captain, Derek Jeter. The Yankee Stadium Legacy cards representing the 2008 New York Yankees season appeared in 2009 Upper Deck Series One Baseball packs in February 2009. They put an end to the Yankee Stadium Legacy promotion. The five contest winners would receive the 82 cards representing the final season at Yankee Stadium.

Tommy Baxter, a 36-year-old from Little Rock, Arkansas, was the first collector to put together Upper Deck's Yankee Stadium Legacy (YSL) Collection. Baxter was a Cubs fan. Baxter's accomplishment was commemorated with a card in 2009 Upper Deck Series One Baseball.

== Notable events ==
Some of the cards in the set commemorate some of the most famous sporting events that have taken place at Yankee Stadium. Some of these events include:

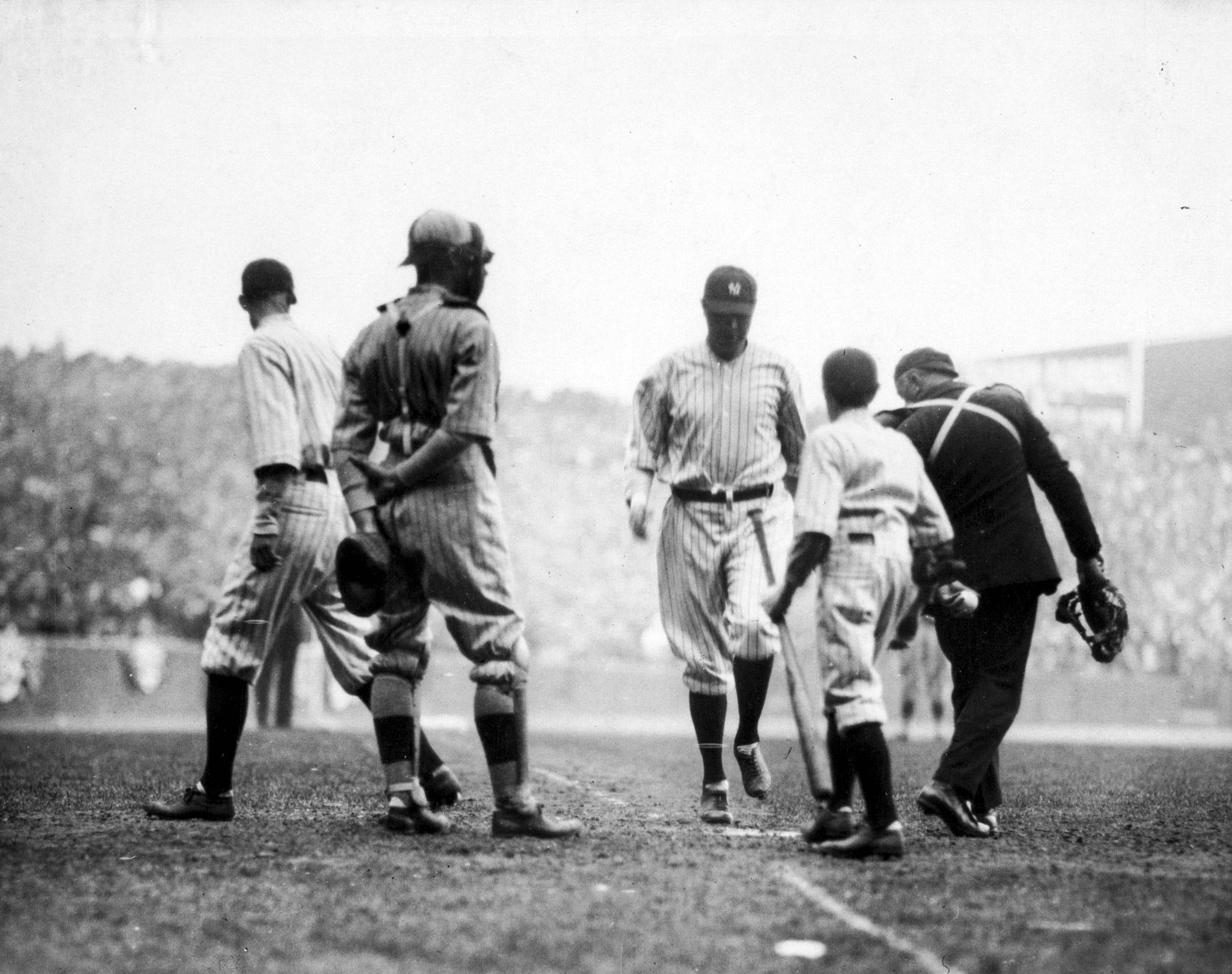
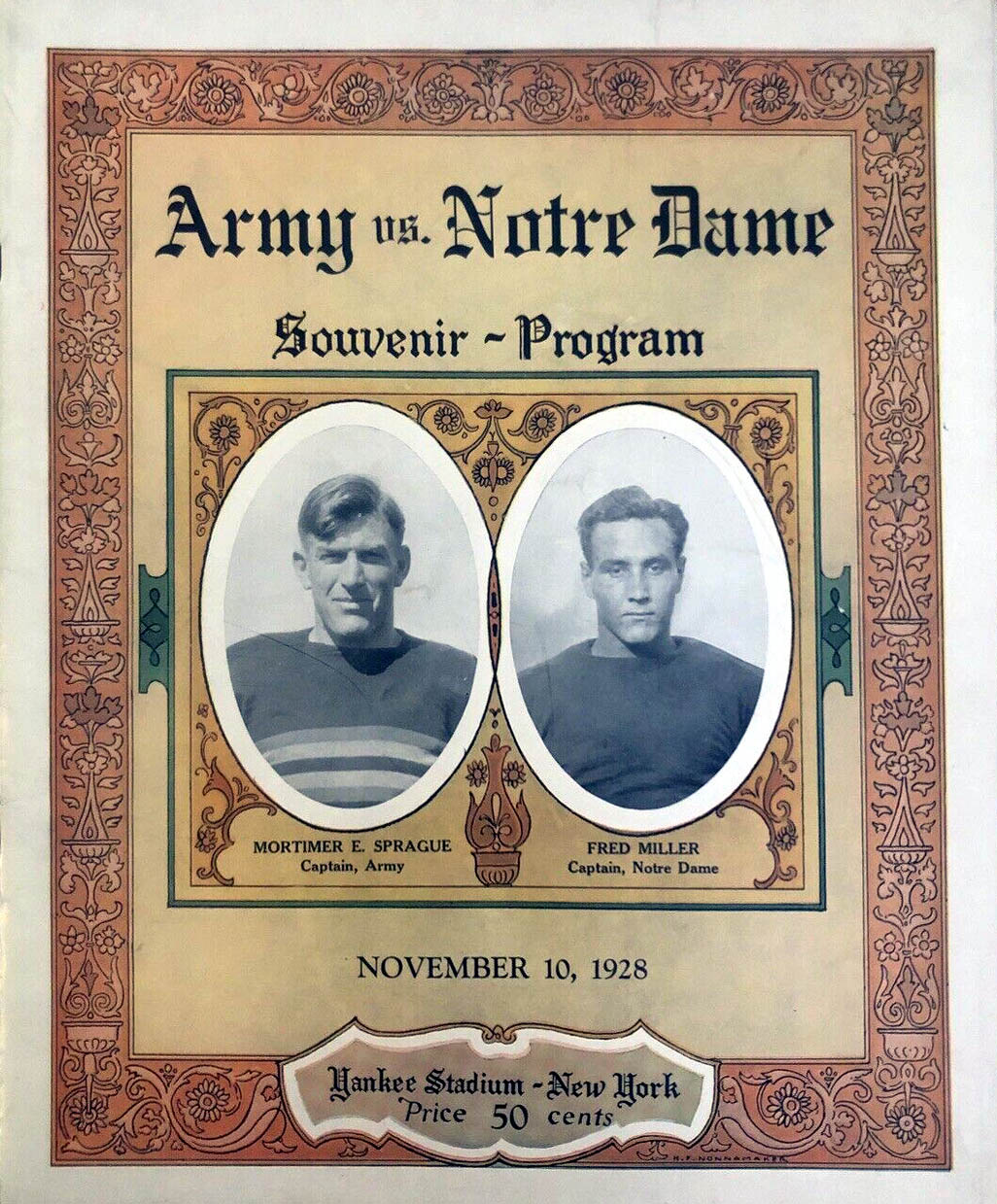
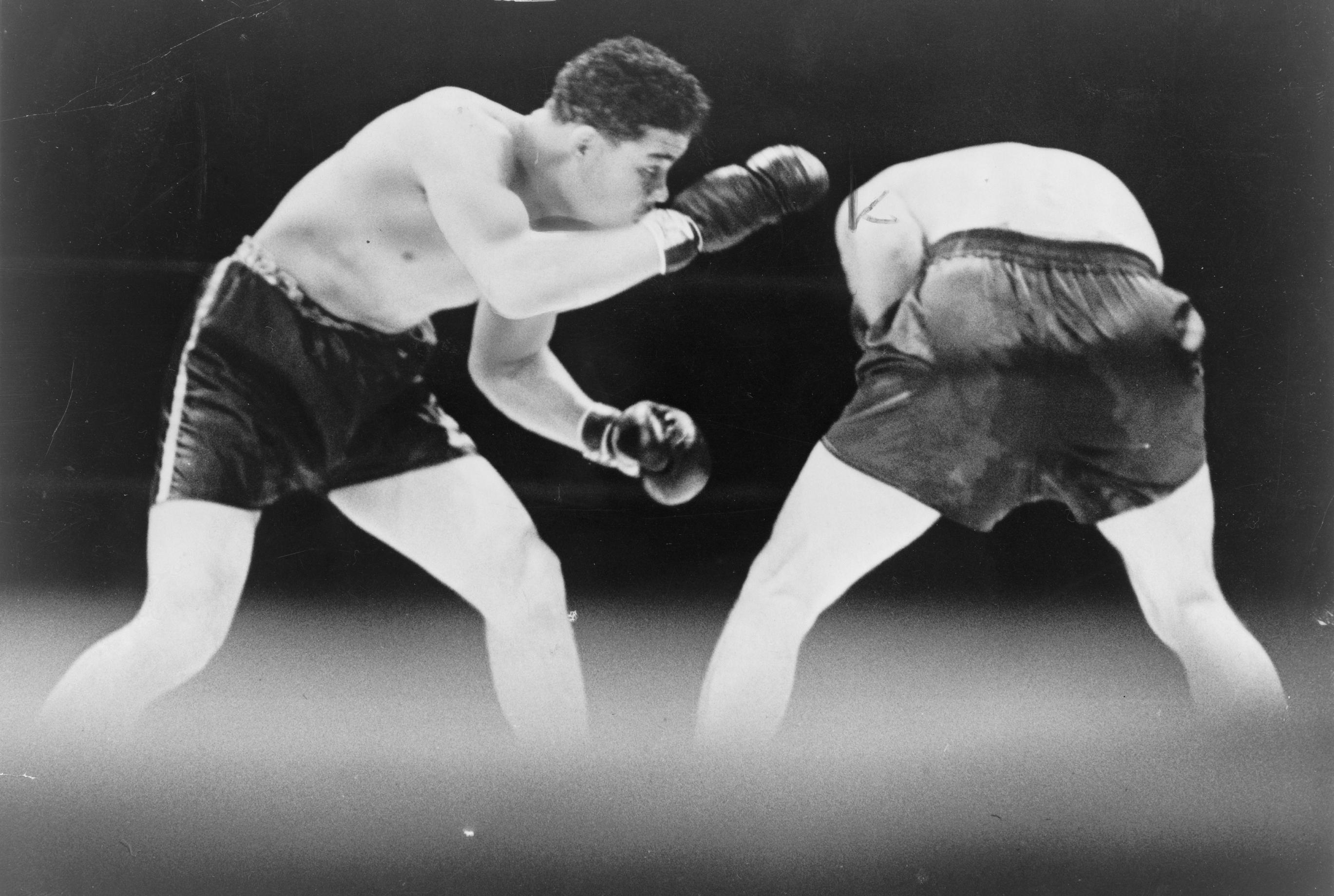
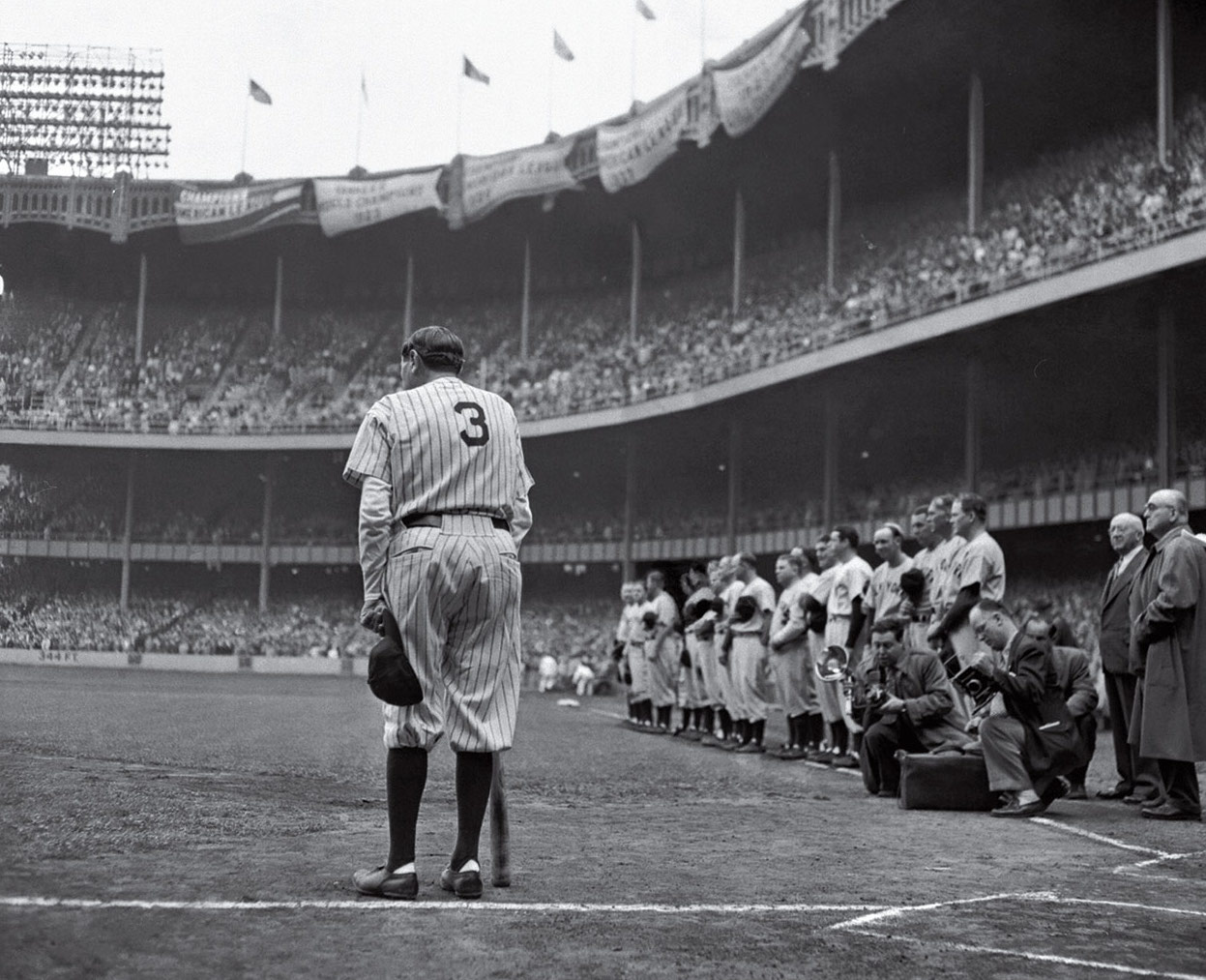
Some memorable sports moments at Yankee Stadium that were part of the set (above): Babe Ruth's first home run at Yankee Stadium (1923); Army v Notre Dame (1928); (below): Joe Louis vs Max Schmeling (1936), and Babe Ruth's last visit to Yankee Stadium (1948)

Card #	Event	Date
1	Babe Ruth first game at Yankee Stadium opening (Note: Opened in 1923, the old Yankee Stadium hosted games until 2008, being then demolished.)	Apr 18, 1923
473HM	Notre Dame vs. Army college football: "Win one for the Gipper" speech (Note: This refers to the speech by Notre Dame coach Knute Rockne at halftime of the 1928 game v Army. Rockne tried to inspire his players telling them the tragic story of George Gipp (died in 1920 at 25), considered the greatest player ever at ND. Notre Dame won 12–6.)	Nov 10, 1928
	Lou Gehrig's "Luckiest man alive" speech (Note: On July 4, 1939, Gehrig delivered what has been called "baseball's Gettysburg Address" to a sold-out crowd at Yankee Stadium. During his speech, Gehrig considered himself "the luckiest man on the face of the earth".)	Jul 4, 1939
1288HM	1939 Major League Baseball All-Star Game	Jul 11, 1939
	Babe Ruth's final visit to Yankee Stadium" (Note: That day, the Yankees scheduled the stadium's 25th. anniversary and the retirement of Ruth's #3. A sick and tired Ruth attended the ceremony, dressed in his uniform with the number 3 on the back. He died two months later.)	Jun 13, 1948
	Joe Louis vs. Max Schmeling heavyweight title bout (Note: It was a two-fight series that came to embody the broader political and social conflict of the time. As the most significant African American athlete of his age and the most successful black fighter since Jack Johnson, Louis was a focal point for African American pride in the 1930s. Moreover, as a contest between representatives of the United States and Nazi Germany during the 1930s, the fights came to symbolize the struggle between democracy and fascism.)	Jun 19, 1936
2835HM	1958 NFL Championship Game (New York Giants v Baltimore Colts) (Note: The game (won by the Colts 23–17) has since become widely known as "The Greatest Game Ever Played". Its legendary status in the pantheon of historic NFL games was again confirmed by a nationwide poll of 66 media members in 2019, who voted it the best game in the league's first 100 years.)	Dec 28, 1958
2946	1960 MLB All-Star Game (2nd.)	Jul 13, 1960
3073	Roger Maris breaks Babe Ruth's home run record	Oct 1, 1961
4131 HM	Muhammad Ali's title defense against Ken Norton (Note: Ali won.)	Sep 28, 1976
	Reggie Jackson's three home runs in Game 6 of the 1977 World Series	Oct 18, 1977
	Pine Tar Incident (Note: This was a controversial incident in 1983 during an American League baseball game played between the Kansas City Royals and New York Yankees. With his team trailing 4–3 in the top half of the ninth inning and two out, George Brett hit a two-run home run to give his team the lead; however, Yankees manager Billy Martin, who had noticed a large amount of pine tar on Brett's bat, requested that the umpires inspect his bat. The umpires ruled that the amount on the bat exceeded that allowed by rule, nullified Brett's home run, and called him out. As Brett was the third out in the ninth inning with the home team in the lead, the game ended with a Yankees win. Nevertheless, the Royals protested the game, upheld by American League president Lee MacPhail, who ordered that the game be continued from the point of Brett's home run. The game was resumed 25 days later on August 18, and officially ended with the Royals winning 5–4.)	Jul 24, 1983

== Guinness Record ==
According to a January 2008 Upper Deck press release, Guinness World Records would certify Yankee Stadium Legacy as the largest baseball card set ever produced, once all the cards are released.

However, the 1998 Topps TEK set contained 90 different player cards, that were each available in 90 different variations, for a total of 8,100 different cards which some collectors consider to be an even larger complete set.

== Distribution ==
The various sets where the Yankee Stadium Legacy cards were inserted into were: Spectrum; Piece of History; SPx; Upper Deck Series Two; SP Legendary Cuts (Hobby-only); SP Authentic; UDx; and UD Masterpieces. Upper Deck started the website www.OwnTheLegacy.com so that collectors could find out more about the Yankee Stadium Legacy set. Alphanumeric codes found on the backs of Yankee Stadium Legacy cards can be entered at the site, and collectors will can use the site to manage their collections online, and track their collections against other collectors via a leader board.

The cards commemorating the 2008 New York Yankees season were featured in Series 1 of 2009 Upper Deck baseball. Two of the more notable cards include YSL-AG (commemorating the 2008 Major League Baseball All-Star Game) and card YSL-6742 featuring Andy Pettite commemorating the final game at Yankee Stadium).
