= Pierre Bergé =

French businessman (1930–2017)

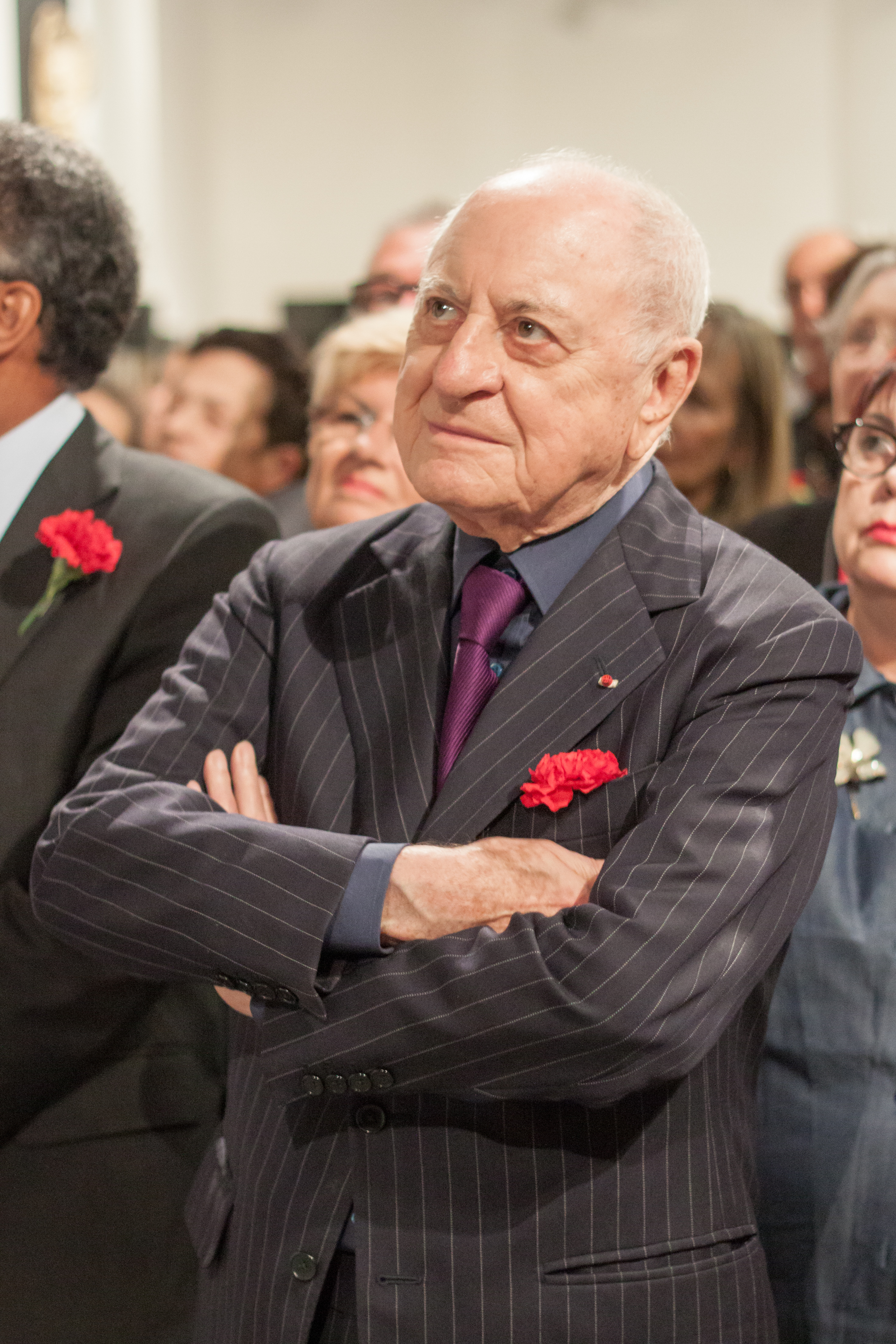
- Bergé in 2012
- Born: Pierre Vital Georges Bergé; 14 November 1930; Saint-Pierre-d'Oléron, France
- Died: 8 September 2017 (aged 86); Saint-Rémy-de-Provence, France
- Occupation: Businessman
- Spouse: Madison Cox (m. 2017)
- Partner(s): Bernard Buffet; Yves Saint Laurent

Pierre Vital Georges Bergé (French pronunciation: [pjɛʁ vital ʒɔʁʒ bɛʁʒe]; 14 November 1930 – 8 September 2017) was a French industrialist and patron. He co-founded the fashion label Yves Saint Laurent (YSL), and was a longtime business partner—and onetime partner—of its namesake designer.

== Early life and education ==
Bergé was born in Saint-Pierre-d'Oléron, on the Oléron Island, Poitou-Charentes, on 14 November 1930. His mother, Christiane, was a progressive teacher, who used the Montessori method. His father worked for the tax office. Bergé attended the Lycée Eugène Fromentin in La Rochelle, and, later, went to Paris. On the day of his arrival, as he was walking on the Champs-Élysées, French poet Jacques Prévert landed on him following a fall from his apartment window.

At the age of 18 in La Rochelle, I decided to leave my family. The day I arrived in Paris, I went for a walk on the Champs-Elysées when suddenly I saw a man go through a French window, fall through the air, grab at a store sign and crash at my feet. He was bleeding profusely. An ambulance arrived and took him to Marmottan hospital. The next day, I discovered in the newspapers that it had been Jacques Prévert. I have always considered it an omen that the same day I got to Paris, a poet fell on my head.

— Pierre Bergé

== Career ==
During his early years in Paris, Bergé met both Albert Camus and Sartre through his involvement in leftist organisations, including editing a short-lived leftist magazine.

Bergé also befriended and dated the young French artist Bernard Buffet, and helped facilitate Buffet's success.

=== Yves Saint Laurent ===
Bergé met Yves Saint Laurent in 1958. They became romantically involved and together launched Yves Saint Laurent Couture House in 1961. The couple split amicably in 1976 and remained lifelong friends and business partners.

In 1992, Bergé sold shares of the fashion house just before the company released a poor economic report. In 1996, this action was deemed to be insider trading and he was sentenced to a fine of one million Francs.

Bergé acted as CEO of Yves Saint Laurent Haute Couture until it closed in 2002. Highly protective of and invested in the reputation and legacy of Saint Laurent Couture, Bergé was known as the "Dean of Yves Saint Laurent".

After the close of the Couture house, Bergé became president of the Pierre Bergé–Yves Saint Laurent Foundation.

Bergé published a book, Lettres à Yves, in 2010 which was translated into English with the title, Yves Saint Laurent: A Moroccan Passion, in September 2014. On 2 November 2010, he bought a stake in Le Monde newspaper, along with investors Matthieu Pigasse and Xavier Niel.

In the same year he was profiled in Pierre Thoretton's documentary film L'Amour fou, which centred on his auctioning of Saint-Laurent's art collection.

== Illness and death ==
In November 2009, Bergé revealed he was suffering from myopathy.

Bergé died of myopathy on 8 September 2017 in Saint-Rémy-de-Provence at the age of 86.

== Personal life ==
=== Relationships ===
Bergé lived with his lover Bernard Buffet from 1950 to 1958. In 1958, they had a falling out over Bergé's new friendship with fashion designer Yves Saint Laurent.

Bergé had an on-and-off relationship with model Victoire Doutreleau for three years in the 1960s.

Bergé and Saint Laurent ended their romantic relationship in 1976 but remained business partners. According to The New York Times, a few days before Saint Laurent died in 2008, he and Bergé were joined in a same-sex civil union known as a pacte civil de solidarité (PACS) in France. When Saint Laurent was diagnosed with brain cancer, Bergé and the doctor mutually decided that it would be better for him not to know of his impending death. Bergé said, "I have the belief that Yves would not have been strong enough to accept that." During Bergé's eulogy of Saint Laurent, he reflected on their lifetime of memories, saying: "I remember your first collection under your name and the tears at the end. Then the years passed. Oh, how they passed quickly. The divorce was inevitable but the love never stopped."

On 31 March 2017, Bergé married Madison Cox, a landscape architect and gardener, in Paris.

=== Political views ===
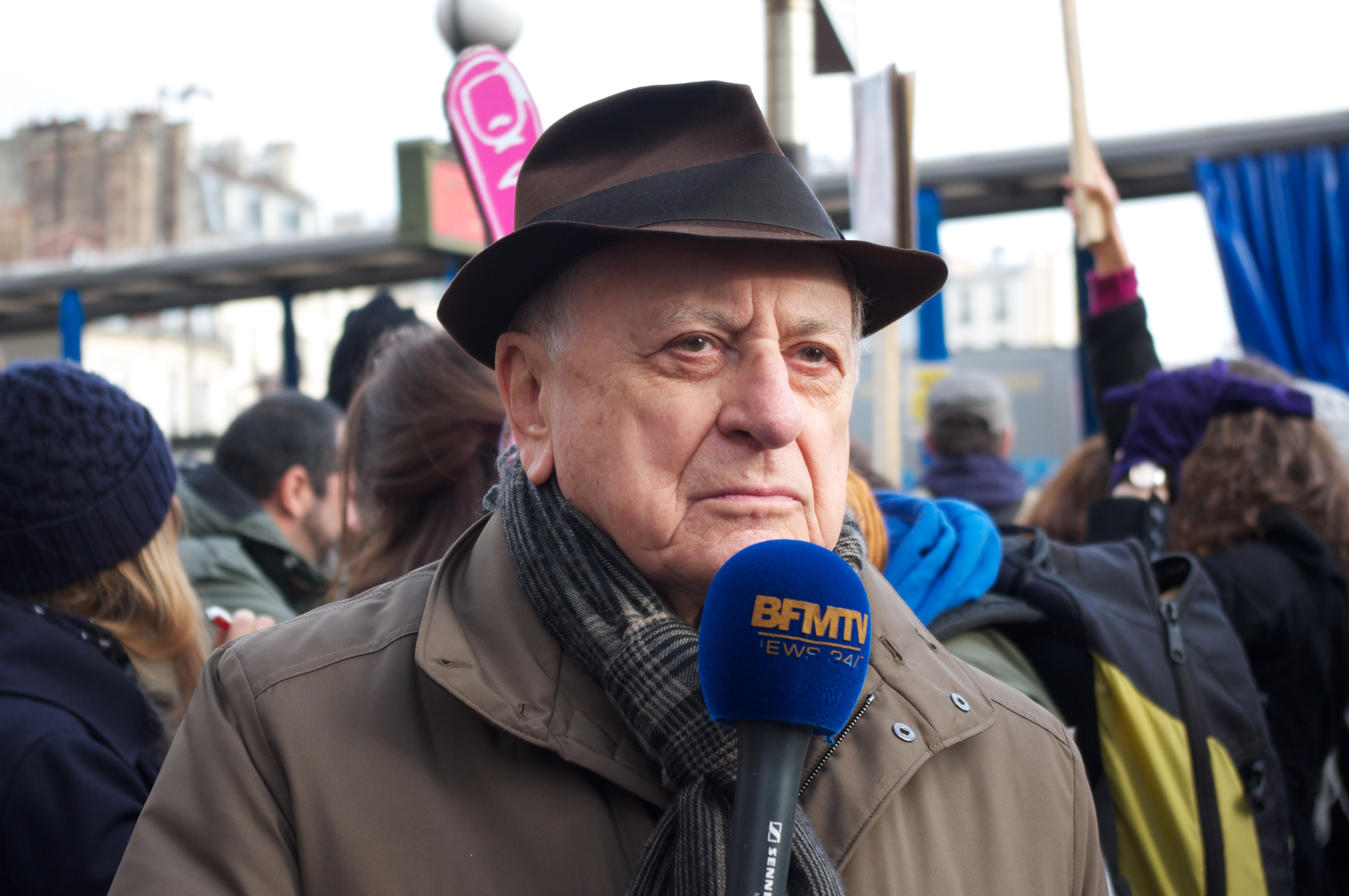
Bergé at a marriage equality rally in 2012

Bergé has been described as a social liberal and a political conservative. He voted for Valéry Giscard d’Estaing in the 1970s.

In 1988, Bergé launched the French magazine Globe, which supported the candidacy of François Mitterrand for the presidential election. Bergé participated in all the campaign rallies of François Mitterrand (contrary to 1981, when he did not vote for Mitterrand).

A supporter of gay rights, he supported the association against AIDS, Act Up-Paris, and assumed ownership of the magazine Têtu. He was also one of the shareholders of Pink TV, before withdrawing. In 1994, he participated with Line Renaud in the creation of the AIDS association Sidaction, and he became its president in 1996 until his death.

In 2007, he supported the candidacy of Ségolène Royal. On a more general basis, he has been considered to be her sponsor. For example, after late 2008, when she was no longer heading the French socialist party and he was paying for the rental of her political office located between the French Senate and House of Representants until this arrangement ceased on 3 March 2011.

=== Philanthropy and cultural interests ===
Bergé later served as President of the association of the friends of Institut François-Mitterrand. In 1993, he helped to launch the magazine Globe Hebdo.

A longtime fan and patron of opera, Mitterrand appointed Bergé president of Opéra Bastille on 31 August 1988. He retired from the post in 1994, becoming honorary president of the Paris National Opera. He was president of the Médiathèque Musicale Mahler, a non-profit library with extensive collections relating to 19th and 20th century music. He was president of the Comité Jean Cocteau, and the owner of the moral rights of all of Jean Cocteau's works.

Bergé's philanthropic patronages have included UNESCO. In July 1992, Bergé was appointed a UNESCO Goodwill Ambassador.

Bergé also set up the museum of Berber art in Marrakesh, Morocco, which holds a collection of Berber objects originating from many different parts of Morocco, from the Rif to the Sahara.

=== Controversy ===
He triggered a controversy by accusing the Téléthon en France of "parasitising the generosity of French people in a populist manner", of not using donations immediately and making real estate investments. The French Association against Myopathies (AFM), which organises the charitable program, denied Bergé's accusations. Following the repeated attacks by the businessman, the AFM filed a complaint for defamation in February 2010. On 28 June 2013, the 17th Chamber of the Paris Criminal Court sentenced him to a €1,500 fine.

On 16 March 2013, on Twitter, Bergé retweeted the following message: "If a bomb explodes on the Champs Elysees because of the "#laManifPourTous", I won't be the one crying." This retweet triggered strong reactions because, according to the "Manif pour tous" organisation, it is an incitement to acts of terrorism. In June, he appeared on the TV show Le Petit Journal, and mentioned this episode, declaring that he was "non-violent".

During the debate on same-sex marriage, Bergé supported the idea of gestational surrogacy and controversially said "rent her womb for a child or lease her arms to work in a factory, what's the difference?", provoking an outcry by same-sex marriage supporters who go against such positions.

In September 2013, Bergé declared he was in favor of the removal of all Christian holidays in France.

In March 2016, Bergé expressed his position on "modest fashion" in an interview with French Radio Station Europe 1, saying, "I am scandalized. Creators should have nothing to do with Islamic fashion. Designers are there to make women more beautiful, to give them their freedom, not to collaborate with this dictatorship which imposes this abominable thing by which we hide women and make them live a hidden life... In one way they are complicit, and all this to make money. Principles should come before money."

=== Collections ===
The art collection of Yves Saint Laurent and Bergé was put up for sale by the latter in February 2009, with two of twelve bronze statue heads looted from the Old Summer Palace in China during the Second Opium War among them. When China requested the return of these statues, Bergé refused and declared "I am prepared to offer this bronze head to the Chinese straight away. All they have to do is to declare they are going to apply human rights, give the Tibetans back their freedom and agree to accept the Dalai Lama on their territory." Bergé's self-admitted "political blackmail" was received with criticism in China. After Chinese art collector, businessman, and advisor to the PRC's National Treasures Fund, Cai Mingchao placed the winning bid and refused to pay on "moral and patriotic grounds," Bergé decided to retain ownership of them. Later on in a ceremony on 29 June 2013, François Pinault (CEO Kering) returned the artifacts to the Chinese National Museum, Beijing.

During the filming of Yves Saint Laurent in 2014, the Fondation Pierre Bergé — Yves Saint Laurent, which holds 7,000 vintage outfits from its archives, played an active role in providing authentic material and fashion of Saint Laurent.

== Awards ==
Bergé was recognized with the Order of Orange-Nassau, Officer of the Ordre National du Mérite, Commandeur des Arts et des Lettres, and Legion of Honor.

== See also ==
- Majorelle Garden
