= Alex Hafner =

Austrian actor

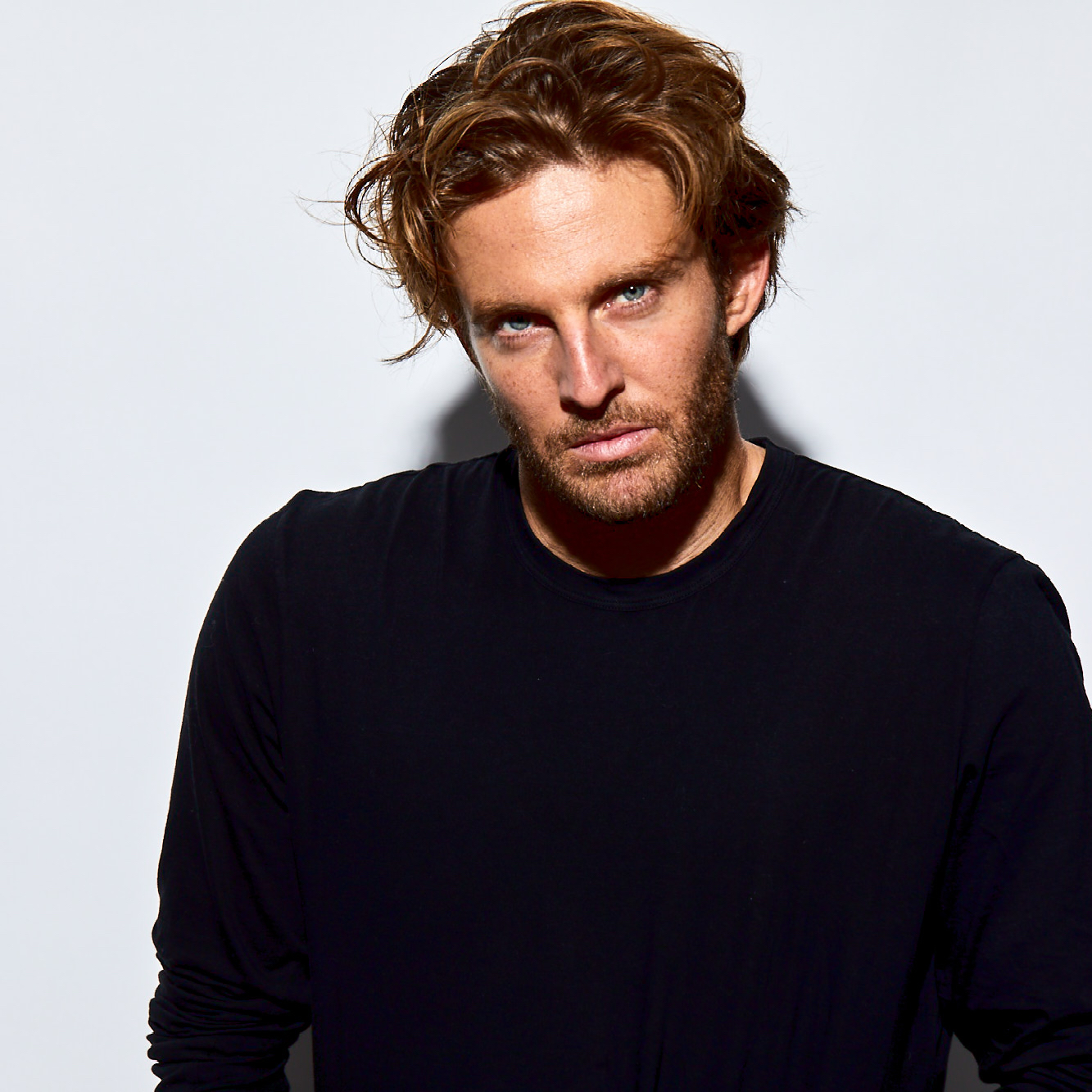
- 2021 by Cuco Cuervo & Cosmopolitan
- Born: 30 April 1989 (age 37); Vienna, Austria
- Occupations: Actor, producer
- Years active: 2012–present

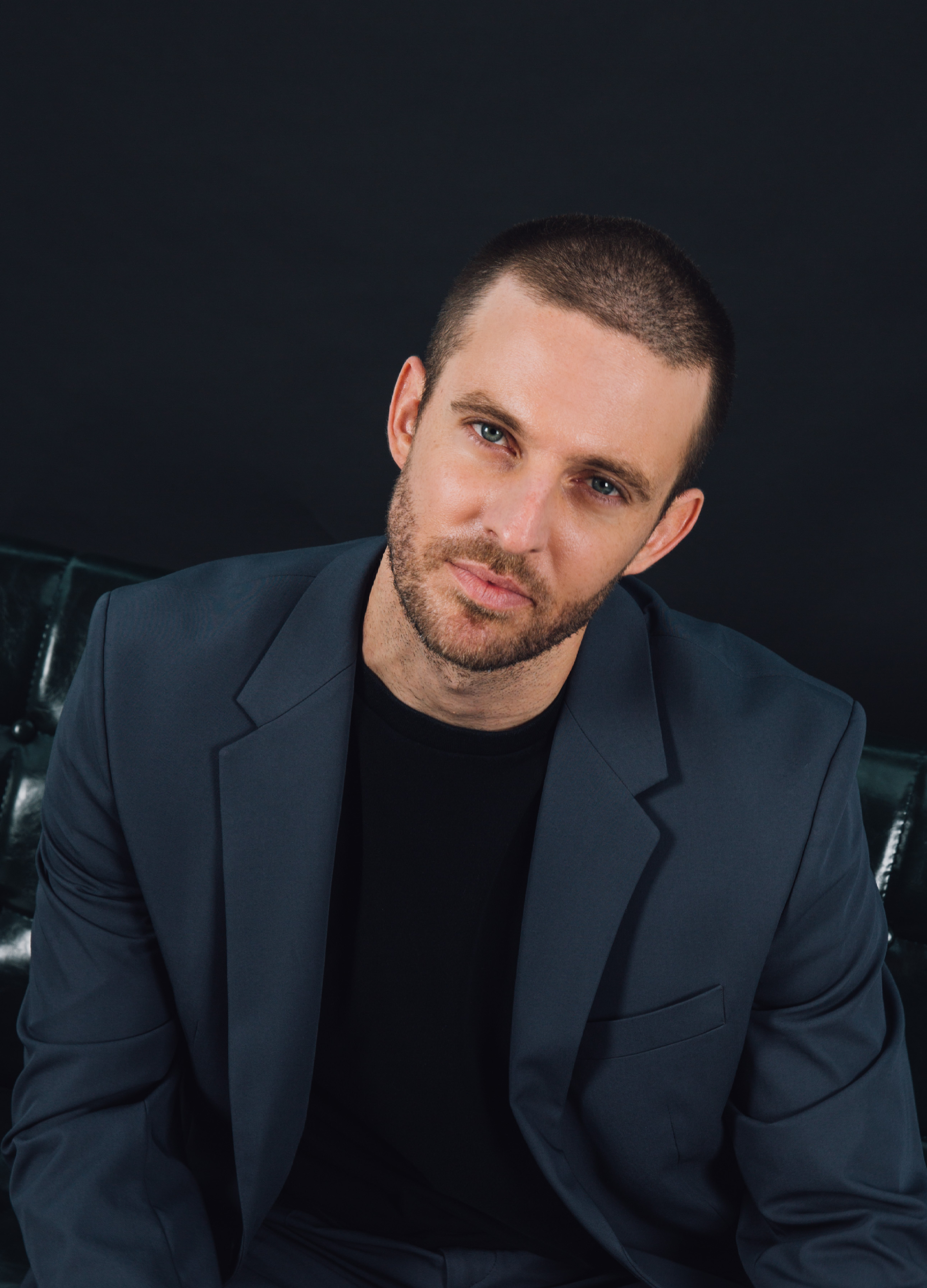
2022, Seoul - photo by Jinny Park

Alex Hafner (born 30 April 1989, Vienna, Austria) is an international film and television actor. His Spanish father is an engineer, his Italian mother an economist. He also has a sister, Sofía. During his childhood his family moved between Madrid, Vienna and Singapore before moving to California to attend school in Beverly Hills. Alex holds a master's degree from USC. Brought up in a fully multilingual home, he speaks fluent German, Spanish, English, and French.

== Career ==
Alex debuted in Daniel Calparsoro's Invader (Spanish title Invasor) starring Alberto Amann, Antonio de la Torre, Karra Elejalde and Inma Cuesta. He then worked on, most notably, The Counselor directed by Ridley Scott with Michael Fassbender, Javier Bardem, Cameron Diaz, Penélope Cruz, and Brad Pitt. He also played alongside Matthew Fox, Jeffrey Donovan, and Clara Lago in Miguel Angel Vivas thriller Extinction.

In 2015, he joined Charlotte LeBon, Tom Hughes, and Oona Chaplin in Mateo Gil's Project Lazarus, set to release late 2016. He also played on Gabriella Cowperthwaite's Megan Leavey, with Kate Mara. He stars in "The Visit" segment of ManiacTales, which will premier in Sitges 2016.

Alex frequently plays as Judith Becker's (Cristina Castaño) love interest Trevor Simmons on the hit Spanish sitcom La Que Se Avecina.

In 2016, Alex was cast in Submergence, directed by Wim Wenders, starring James McAvoy and Alicia Vikander based on the novel written by J.M. Legard.

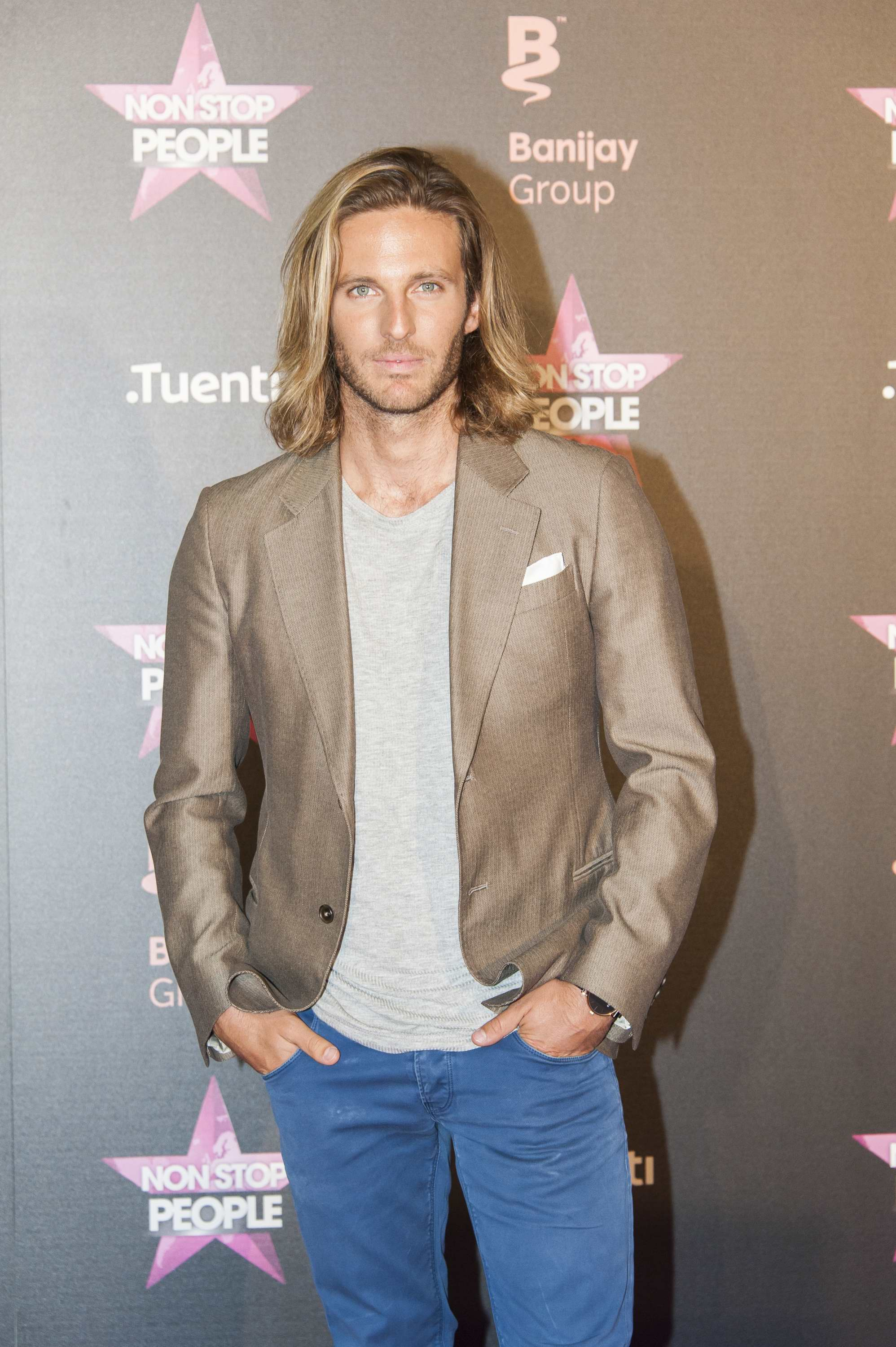
Nonstop People 2015

In 2017, Alex was cast in Megan Leavey, directed by Gabriella Cowperthwaite, with Kate Mara, Tom Felton, Common, and Edie Falco.

In the Spanish market, Alex appears in the Netflix rom-com A Pesar de Todo, alongside Blanca Suarez, Belen Cuesta, Macarena Garcia & Amaia Salamanca; as well as the Movistar+ miniseries Instinto, alongside Mario Casas. He has since then joined the regular cast for the final season of the Netflix hit drama Cable Girls, where he plays a journalist.

In 2019, Alex also was cast as the co-lead in the horror thriller Let It Snow alongside Ivanna Sakhno and Tinatin Dalakshvali, distributed by Lionsgate.

In 2020, he joined BBC One's The Mallorca Files (season 2) as part of the regular cast. Alex was designated as Cosmopolitan Magazine's (Spain) "Cosmo Man" for the month of February.

== Personal life ==
Alex Hafner actively collaborates with Greenpeace and Proactiva Open Arms spearheaded by Javier Bardem and Penelope Cruz.

In 2018, Hafner was spotted on vacation with co-star Cristina Castaño.

== Filmography ==
Filmography
| Year | Title |
|---|---|
| 2012 | Invasor |
| 2013 | The Counselor |
| 2014 | Killing Frisco |
| 2015 | Extinction |
| 2016 | Realive |
| 2017 | Maniac Tales |
| 2017 | Submergence |
| 2017 | Megan Leavey |
| 2018 | Try |
| 2019 | Despite Everything |
| 2020 | Let It Snow |

Television
| Year | Title | Role | Network | Notes |
|---|---|---|---|---|
| 2013 | Boomerang Kids | Ron Gillis | Youtube Red | 3 episodes |
| 2013 | The Avatars | | Disney, RTVE | Episode "Over the STAGE" |
| 2014 - 2016 | La Que Se Avecina | Trevor Simmons | Mediaset, Telecinco, Amazon Prime | 5 episodes, (Seasons 7–9) |
| 2016 | Palabras: La Bienvenida | Nico | RTVE 2 | |
| 2019 | Instinto | Brian | Movistar, Canal+ | 1 episode |
| 2020 | Cable Girls | James Lancaster | Netflix | 6 episodes (Final season) |
| 2020–Present | The Mallorca Files | Robert Herrero | BBC One | 10 episodes (Season 2) |
| 2021 | Parot | El Nuevo | Amazon Studios | 4 episodes |
| 2022 | Vampire Academy | James | Peacock, Universal Television | 5 episodes |
| 2025 | When the Stars Gossip | Santiago Gonzalez | tvN, Netflix | |
