= Federico Díaz =

Federico Díaz may refer to:

- Federico Díaz (artist), Czech-Argentine visual artist
- Federico Díaz (footballer), Argentine goalkeeper
- Federico Diaz (Six Feet Under), a character on the TV series Six Feet Under
