= James Bartley =

Whaler alleged to survive being swallowed whole

James Bartley (1870–1909) is the central figure in a late nineteenth-century story according to which he was swallowed whole by a sperm whale. He was found still living days later in the stomach of the whale, which was dead from harpooning.

The story first appeared in anonymous form in American newspapers. The anonymous article appeared in the St. Louis Globe Democrat of Saint Louis, Missouri, then the note appeared in other newspapers with the title "A Modern Jonah" or something similar in multiple newspapers.

The story was later reprinted in international newspapers, such as the Yarmouth Mercury in England, Great Yarmouth, on August 22, 1891, under headlines like "Man in a Whale's Stomach" and "Rescue of a Modern Jonah".

== Story ==
The story, as reported, is that during a whaling expedition off the Falkland Islands, Bartley’s boat was attacked by a whale, and he was said to have ended up in the whale’s mouth. The story claimed that he survived and was discovered in the whale’s stomach by his crewmates when they, not knowing he was inside, caught and began skinning the whale, because the hot weather otherwise would have rotted the whale meat. It was said that Bartley was inside the whale for 15 hours, that his skin had been bleached by the gastric juices, and that he was blind the rest of his life. In some accounts, however, he was supposed to have returned to work within three weeks. He died 18 years later and his tombstone in Gloucester says "James Bartley – a modern day Jonah."

In 1896, an article titled "A Modern Jonah Proves his Story" was published in the New York World; it quoted a brief portion of this story, as told by Rev. William Justin Harsha, along with some initial observations. This was followed about a week later by another article that briefly summarised some responses from readers, followed by a third article by William L. Stone, who related a similar story involving a massive "man-eating shark".

The French scientist De Parville published a report of the alleged incident in the Paris Journal des Débats in 1914.

== Investigations ==
More recently, the facts were carefully investigated by historian Edward B. Davis, who pointed out many inconsistencies. The ship in the story is The Star of the East. While a British ship by the same name existed and sailed during the time in which the incident allegedly occurred and could have been near the Falklands at the right time, the relevant Star of the East was not a whaling vessel and its crew list did not include a James Bartley. Moreover, Mrs. John Killam, the wife of the Captain, wrote a letter stating that "there is not one word of truth in the whale story. I was with my husband all the years he was in the Star of the East. There was never a man lost overboard while my husband was in her. The sailor has told a great sea yarn." Davis suggested that the story may have been inspired by the "Gorleston whale", a 30-foot (9.1 m) rorqual killed near Great Yarmouth shortly before in June 1891 that generated a lot of publicity.

While the veracity of the story is in question, it is physically possible for a sperm whale to swallow a human whole, as they are known to swallow giant squid whole. However, the person would likely not survive the conditions within its stomach. Like ruminants, the sperm whale has a four-chambered stomach. The first secretes no gastric juices and has very thick muscular walls to crush the food (since whales cannot chew) and resist the claw and sucker attacks of swallowed squid. The second chamber is larger and is where digestion takes place.

== Cultural references ==
George Orwell refers to this incident (twice) in his 1939 novel Coming Up for Air (though not in his 1940 essay "Inside the Whale"). Julian Barnes references the event in his novel A History of the World in 10½ Chapters, as did Arthur C. Clarke's novel Childhood's End and J. M. Ledgard in his novel Submergence, the latter albeit using a different name, John More, for the swallowed victim. Clive Cussler also refers to the James Bartley story in his novel Medusa. James Bartley was also mentioned in the 1965 "Jonah and the Whale" episode of the Voyage to the Bottom of the Sea television series.

== See also ==
- Jonah
