= Let It Snow (2020 film) =

2020 film by Stanislav Kapralov

- Ukrainian theatrical release poster
- Directed by: Stanislav Kapralov
- Written by: Stanislav Kapralov; Omri Rose
- Produced by: Serge Lavrenyuk
- Starring: Ivanna Sakhno; Alex Hafner; Tinatin Dalakishvili
- Cinematography: Yevgeny Usanov
- Edited by: Rafa Garcia; Evgeny Krasulya
- Music by: Alex Chorny
- Production companies: Solar Media Entertainment; FishCorb Films; Laurel Digital Media
- Distributed by: Volga Ukraine (Ukraine); Grindstone Entertainment Group (United States)
- Release dates: 26 August 2020 (Molodist); 22 September 2020 (United States); 28 January 2021 (Ukraine)
- Countries: Ukraine; United States; Spain
- Language: English
- Box office: $129,887

Let It Snow (Ukrainian: «Пік страху», lit. 'Peak of Fear') is a 2020 horror thriller film co-written and directed by Stanislav Kapralov. It stars Ivanna Sakhno, Alex Hafner and Tinatin Dalakishvili.

The film premiered at the 49th Molodist International Film Festival in Kyiv on 26 August 2020. It was released in the United States on 22 September 2020 by Grindstone Entertainment Group and in Ukraine on 28 January 2021 by Volga Ukraine.

== Plot ==
In 2017, in Gudauri, Georgia, a young girl, Katie, is on a famous ski run known as the Black Ridge preparing for her descent in bad visibility when a snowboarder, not seeing her, violently knocks her down. The snowboarder, a man, and his female companion, thinking the child to be dead, quickly abandon her and continue down the mountain.

Three years later, at Christmas time, American snowboarders Mia and her boyfriend Max arrive at the Georgia Ski Hotel in Gudauri intent on snowboarding down the Black Ridge. At the resort, everyone warns them to stay away from the ridge, where multiple snowboarders have gone missing or dead. But Max will not be deterred, even after he and Mia encounter a recovery team the following morning that has brought a dead snowboarder down from the ridge.

Max bribes a reluctant helicopter pilot to airlift himself and Mia to the ridge, where Max intends to propose to Mia. The snowboard run down the ridge starts promisingly enough until a thick fog separates Max and Mia. While trying to get her bearings, Mia is knocked unconscious by a hooded figure on a snowmobile. When she wakes up, she tries to reach Max on a walkie-talkie and on a cell phone but is unsuccessful. Searching for Max, she follows the snowmobile’s tracks until she spots Max in the distance between two incongruous rows of red roses stuck into the snow. She calls out to Max, who doesn’t answer. As Mia gets closer, she realizes that Max is bound, gagged and tied to the back of a snowmobile, whose driver takes off, dragging Max away.

Mia again follows the tracks until she catches up with the snowmobile driver, who sets off a charge, causing an avalanche that buries Mia. The snowmobile driver then tries to kill Mia by stabbing at her with a knife through the snow but manages only to slightly wound her arm. Sometime later, a stranger pulls Mia up from beneath the snow and transports her back to his cabin where he dresses her wound and provides her with food, drink, and a place to sleep.

When Mia wakes up the next morning, she is alone. After not finding her rescuer anywhere in or around the cabin, she finds a snowmobile. Taking a ring of keys from the cabin, she tries unsuccessfully to start it only for the hooded snowmobiler to appear and dangle the correct key in front of her. The hooded snowmobiler takes off with the key, leaving Mia to continue her pursuit on foot.

Mia eventually passes out from exhaustion. When she wakes up, she hears two rescuers nearby complaining about having to work on Christmas, but she is too weak to reach out to them before they leave without spotting her. She resumes her search on foot until she comes upon a tent where she finds one of Max’s gloves. Entering the tent, she sees a shrine dedicated to Katie, the little girl who was killed in the prologue. She also sees the stranger who helped her, semi-conscious and hanging by his arms from ropes. He weakly urges her to run, but it is too late. The hooded snowmobiler has snuck up behind her. Mia runs away and continues her search.

At the edge of a steep ridge, she believes she sees Max again, but this time it’s Max’s corpse, encased within a bloody snowman, with his arm outstretched holding the case containing the engagement ring, which Mia puts on her finger. Completely delusional at this point, Mia embraces the snowman and talks to it as if it were the live Max. Mia says, “Let’s go home,” and, embracing the snowman, dives off the edge to the bottom of the ridge far below. The hooded snowmobiler, revealed in a voiceover to be the mother of Katie, observes this and leaves, having accomplished her “mission.” In an end-credits scene, Mia is revealed to have survived the fall, bruised, bloody, and beaten but intact. She stands up and lets out a long, angry scream.

== Cast ==
- Ivanna Sakhno as Mia
- Alex Hafner as Max
- Tinatin Dalakishvili as Lali

== Production ==
Let It Snow is a co-production of Ukraine, the United States and Spain. The film was shot in Gudauri, Georgia, in 2019.

== Release ==
Let It Snow premiered in the Special Events section of the 49th Molodist International Film Festival in Kyiv on 26 August 2020. In June 2020, Grindstone Entertainment Group acquired North American distribution rights to the film. It was released on DVD, digital platforms and video on demand in the United States on 22 September 2020. In Ukraine, the film was released in theaters on 28 January 2021 by Volga Ukraine.

== Critical reception ==
About the film, John Squires of Bloody Disgusting remarked, "Most everything about Let It Snow is under-cooked, from the relationship between Mia and Max [its protagonists] to the larger mythology that the two find themselves tangled in."
