= Arctic Heart =

- Theatrical release poster
- Le Secret des banquises
- Directed by: Marie Madinier
- Written by: Marie Madinier
- Produced by: Kristina Larsen
- Starring: Guillaume Canet; Charlotte Le Bon
- Cinematography: Pascal Marti
- Edited by: Guerric Catala
- Music by: Stephen Warbeck
- Production companies: Les Films du Lendemain; Entre Chien et Loup
- Distributed by: Mars Films
- Release dates: 9 June 2016 (Cabourg); 22 June 2016 (France)
- Running time: 81 minutes
- Country: France
- Language: French
- Budget: $5.5 million
- Box office: $64.000

Arctic Heart (French: Le Secret des banquises) is a 2016 French romantic comedy film written and directed by Marie Madinier. It stars Guillaume Canet and Charlotte Le Bon.

== Plot ==
Professor Quignard and his team of researchers have been studying "PPM", an immunizing protein produced by penguins, for a Nobel Prize research project. Christophine, a shy and young PhD student who is secretly in love with Quignard, decides to inject herself with the penguin genome, in an attempt to advance the professor's research and to get closer to him. Amidst all the experiments she wants him more and more, whereas the professor is always concerned about the results of his experiments. It breaks her heart that even after all she has done for him, he is so indifferent towards her but she decides to keep her feelings to herself. The results finally lead him to his goals, and he is selected to win the Nobel Prize, but Christophine realises that her body is changing and reacting to the experiments, and she decides to stay alone, closing herself to everything. When the professor finds out, he tries every possible way to save her but he has no option left other than sending her to Antarctica to live with penguins. The professor then injects himself with the same drug that Christophine took and goes and lives with her in Antarctica, after having grasped his feelings for her.

== Cast ==
- Guillaume Canet as Quignard
- Charlotte Le Bon as Christophine
- Anne Le Ny as Nadine
- Patrick d'Assumçao as Philippe
- Damien Chapelle as Siegfried

== Distribution ==
The film is available in the United States and in the Netherlands on Netflix.
