= Realive =

- Theatrical release poster with the Spanish title Proyecto Lázaro
- Directed by: Mateo Gil
- Written by: Mateo Gil
- Produced by: Marina Fuentes Arredonda; Ibon Cormenzana; Ignasi Estapé; Jofre Farré; Genevieve Lemal; Sandra Tapia; Jérôme Vidal
- Starring: Tom Hughes; Charlotte Le Bon; Oona Chaplin
- Cinematography: Pau Esteve Birba
- Edited by: Guillermo de la Cal
- Music by: Lucas Vidal
- Production companies: Arcadia Motion Pictures; Achaman Films AIE; Canal+ España; Noodles Production; Scope Pictures; Televisión Española
- Distributed by: Filmax (Spain); Syfy Films (North America)
- Release date: 23 July 2016 (Fantasia International Film Festival)
- Running time: 112 minutes
- Countries: Belgium; Spain; France
- Language: English

Realive (Spanish: Proyecto Lázaro) is a 2016 Belgian-Spanish-French English-language science fiction drama film written and directed by Mateo Gil.

== Plot ==
A man with a terminal illness has his body frozen in cryostasis and becomes the first man to be resuscitated from cryonics seventy years later in the year 2084. His on-and-off-again girlfriend is by his side as he commits suicide in order to be cryopreserved. Being an accomplished artist with a design firm under his wing, he cannot stand the randomness of his throat cancer and decides to "go" under his own volition and control. After his "resurrection" under project "Lazarus", by a company with its own agenda, he starts to question mortality and matters of soul, as well as life as a transition of matter and energy. After realizing that he only valued his own life under the threat of his imminent death, unable to cope with his new life, he decides to commit suicide. Alas, the film ends with the realization that is something he's not allowed to do.

== Cast ==
- Tom Hughes as Marc Jarvis
- Charlotte Le Bon as Elizabeth
- Oona Chaplin as Naomi
- Barry Ward as Dr. West
- Julio Perillán as Dr. Serra
- Rafael Cebrián as Jeffrey
- Bruno Sevilla as Charles
- Daniel Horvath as Surgeon
- Alex Hafner as The Elderly Hornball
- Godeliv Van den Brandt as Sigourney
- Melina Matthews as Technician
- Nikol Kollars as Dr. Gethers
- Angelo Olivier as Marc's Father
- Yone Sosa as Lizard boy
- Maarten Swaan as Alex
- Alexandra Szucs as Sandy
- Johanna Wallmeier as Rebecca
- Josh Gorroño Chapman as Boy 1

== Production ==
Filming took place in Tenerife, Canary Islands (Spain).

== Reception ==
Film critic Dennis Harvey of Variety.com wrote that "Gil demonstrates a graceful assurance orchestrating Realive's design and technical elements" but felt that the film was ultimately "emotionally antiseptic".
