= Ibelin (upcoming film) =

- Directed by: Morten Tyldum
- Screenplay by: Ilaria Bernardini; Hossein Amini
- Based on: Musings of Life by Mats Steen
- Produced by: Philippe Rousselet; Fabrice Gianfermi; Morten Tyldum; Guri Neby; Jérôme Seydoux
- Starring: Charlie Plummer; Toni Collette; Stephen Graham; Maisy Stella; Isabela Merced; Kirby Howell-Baptiste; Ivanna Sakhno; John Bradley; Bill Nighy
- Cinematography: Óscar Faura
- Production companies: Vendôme Pictures; Pathé; Neby-Tyldum AS
- Countries: United States; France
- Language: English

Ibelin is an upcoming biographical drama film directed by Morten Tyldum. Based on the life of disabled Norwegian gamer Mats Steen, the film will star Charlie Plummer, Toni Collette, Stephen Graham, Maisy Stella, Isabela Merced, Kirby Howell-Baptiste, Ivanna Sakhno, John Bradley, and Bill Nighy.

== Premise ==
After the passing of Mats Steen, his parents soon discover that he had left a huge impact on World of Warcraft.

== Cast ==
- Charlie Plummer as Mats Steen
- Toni Collette as Trude Steen, Mats's mother
- Stephen Graham as Robert Steen, Mats's father
- Maisy Stella as Mia Steen, Mats's younger sister
- Isabela Merced
- Bill Nighy
- Kirby Howell-Baptiste
- Ivanna Sakhno
- John Bradley
- Ekow Quartey
- Clodagh Bhalla
- Jax James

== Production ==
In 2022, it was announced that Vendôme Pictures would be producing a film based on the life of Mats Steen, known as Ibelin in the popular MMO game, World of Warcraft. Morten Tyldum was set to direct, while Kyle Killen was set to write the script.

In November 2025, Charlie Plummer, Toni Collette, Stephen Graham, Maisy Stella, Isabela Merced, and Anthony Hopkins joined the cast, with Ilaria Bernardini and Hossein Amini having written the current script. In April 2026, Bill Nighy joined the cast to replace Hopkins; Kirby Howell-Baptiste, Ivanna Sakhno, and John Bradley were also added to the cast, as filming began in Norway. Óscar Faura served as the cinematographer.
