= Bastille Day (2016 film) =

2016 film by James Watkins

- Theatrical release poster
- Directed by: James Watkins
- Written by: Andrew Baldwin; James Watkins
- Produced by: Bard Dorros; Fabrice Gianfermi; Steve Golin; David Kanter; Philippe Rousselet
- Starring: Idris Elba; Richard Madden; Charlotte Le Bon; Kelly Reilly; Eriq Ebouaney; José Garcia
- Cinematography: Tim Maurice-Jones
- Edited by: Jon Harris
- Music by: Alex Heffes
- Production companies: Anonymous Content; Vendôme Pictures; StudioCanal; TF1 Films Production
- Distributed by: StudioCanal (France, Luxembourg); High Top Releasing (United States)
- Release dates: 22 April 2016 (United Kingdom); 13 July 2016 (France); 18 November 2016 (United States)
- Running time: 92 minutes
- Countries: France; United States; United Kingdom
- Languages: English; French
- Budget: $4 million
- Box office: $14.9 million

Bastille Day (released as The Take in North America and on international home release) is a 2016 action thriller film co-written and directed by James Watkins. It is a French, British and American venture produced by Anonymous Content, Vendôme Pictures, TF1 Films Production and StudioCanal. The film stars Idris Elba, Richard Madden, Charlotte Le Bon, Eriq Ebouaney and José Garcia. The film was released in the United Kingdom on 22 April 2016 and 13 July 2016 in France, and on 18 November 2016 in the United States.

== Plot ==
On the eve of Bastille Day in Paris, American drifter and pickpocket Michael Mason steals a woman's handbag, not knowing that it contains explosives. After taking the cash and her cell phone from the bag, he discards it, caught unwittingly on CCTV as he does so. The bag then detonates and kills four people. Upon being captured by CIA agent Sean Briar, who is being reprimanded for irresponsible conduct on the job, Mason protests that he is not a terrorist and tells Briar that the bag contained a cellphone owned by a woman named Zoé. The bomb was set up by a group of corrupt policemen, all of them members in the French special police RAPID unit led by Rafi Bertrand, who intend to pull a robbery at the Bank of France. Zoé was told to plant the bomb at the office of the French Nationalist Party (as part of a diversion for the heist), but after seeing the night cleaning crew arrive, she was unwilling to kill innocents and so abandoned the plan. Zoé's boyfriend Jean, one of the conspirators, allows her to escape, realising that his compatriots will kill her.

The group tracks Zoé's phone to Briar's and Mason's location. Briar engages the conspirators, who pin him down, while Mason escapes. Bertrand's team proceeds to plant fake evidence at a mosque and stir up a nationwide uproar among its Islamic population, using agitating hashtags on the Internet. Chased by the French authorities and Bertrand's forces, Mason is picked up by Briar, who has come to believe his story and intends to clear the case with his help, even against the orders of his superiors. They track Zoé to the hideout of her friend Paul and his motorcycle gang, but the gang firebombs their car to cover their escape. Appropriating another car, they track Paul down to the bar where he works, and Mason instigates a brawl, during which he steals Paul's identity card.

Mason and Briar use the card to find out Paul's address, where Zoé is hiding, and manage to gain her cooperation. Zoé leads them to Jean's apartment, where they find his body and an ID and badge identifying him as a police officer. Briar informs his colleague, Karen Dacre, who confers with her French contact, DGSI Director Victor Gamieux, about taking Mason and Zoé into protective custody. However, Gamieux, actually the mastermind of the heist conspiracy, kills Dacre after obtaining the information he needs and sends a pick-up team consisting of his henchmen. Briar, Mason and Zoé manage to pick up clues about the men's true allegiance and fight their way out of the deathtrap. Now realising Gamieux's hand in the game, the three head toward the Bank of France.

When a crowd of protestors masses at the front of the bank – as the conspirators have intended – Gamieux assigns Bertrand's RAPID team to the building to provide interior security, thus facilitating the digital robbery of its entire monetary reserves (half a billion euros). Upon arriving at the bank, Briar disguises himself as a RAPID officer and manages to gain access to the building before he is found out. Hearing of his predicament over their stolen police van's radio, Zoé and Mason start a riot among the protestors, who storm the bank and overpower the RAPID officers closing in on Briar. Briar subsequently infiltrates the vault and engages Bertrand and his remaining henchman. Bertrand escapes with the mini-USB external hard drive on which the money has been downloaded, but Briar contacts Mason, who steals the flash drive from Bertrand. Upon noticing the theft, Bertrand takes Zoé hostage. Gamieux, trying to salvage his plan, commands a squad of policemen to shoot and kill Bertrand, and Mason escapes with the flash drive. Zoé survives.

Sometime later, Mason, working with Briar and French law enforcement, meets with Gamieux on the pretense of trading the flash drive for a passport and a ride out of the country, leading to the latter's arrest.

== Cast ==
- Idris Elba as Sean Briar, a CIA agent
- Richard Madden as Michael Mason, an American pickpocket living in Paris
- Charlotte Le Bon as Zoé Naville, an anti-fascist protestor
- Kelly Reilly as Karen Dacre, a senior CIA agent
- José Garcia as Victor Gamieux, the director of the DGSI
- Thierry Godard as Bertrand Rafi, a corrupt commander in the French National Police RAPID Unit
- Anatol Yusef as Tom Luddy, leader of the CIA surveillance unit in Paris
- Eriq Ebouaney as Baba, Mason's black market contact for stolen goods
- Arieh Worthalter as Jean (Pascal Fibbert)
- Stéphane Caillard as Beatrice

== Production ==
On 17 April 2012, Pierre Morel signed on to direct. Morel would later be replaced by Morten Tyldum, in his international debut. Ben Affleck has been attached to star, but dropped out due to a scheduling conflict, with Tyldum leaving for The Imitation Game. On 7 August 2013, Baran bo Odar became the new director, although he would also leave shortly after. On 11 November 2013, Idris Elba joined the cast of the film. On 2 October 2014, Richard Madden joined the cast. On 18 May 2014, Focus Features acquired the rights to distribute the film in North America, now with James Watkins as director. Principal photography began on 13 October 2014 in Paris, and ended on 17 December 2014.

== Release ==
In the United Kingdom, StudioCanal scheduled the film to be released on 19 February 2016. However, following the terrorist attacks in Paris in November 2015, the film was delayed. Bastille Day was released simultaneously in the United Kingdom, Ireland and Sweden on 22 April 2016. In France, the film was released on 13 July 2016 to coincide with the dates in the story. Following the 2016 Nice truck attack, Studiocanal pulled the film from theatres on 17 July 2016, citing it as a "sign of respect for the victims and their families."

== Reception ==
On Rotten Tomatoes, the film holds an approval rating of 48% based on 80 reviews, with an average rating of 5.2/10. The site's critical consensus reads, "Bastille Day proves Idris Elba is an action hero in waiting – specifically, waiting for a script that deserves his talents." On Metacritic, the film has a weighted average score of 48 out of 100, based on 16 critics, indicating "mixed or average reviews".
