= Ivanna Sakhno =

Ukrainian actress (born 1997)

- Іванна Сахно
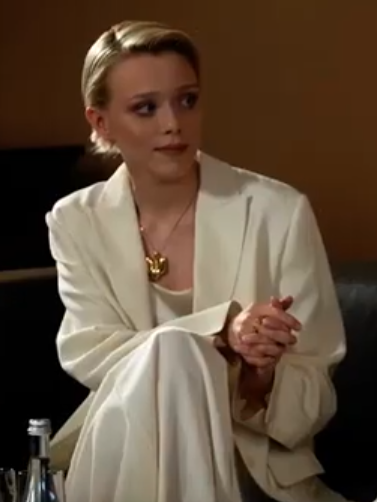
- Sakhno in 2023
- Born: Ivanna Anatoliyivna Sakhno; 14 November 1997 (age 28); Kyiv, Ukraine
- Citizenship: Ukraine; United States
- Occupations: Actress, activist
- Years active: 2005–present

Ivanna Anatoliyivna Sakhno (Ukrainian: Іванна Анатоліївна Сахно,; born 14 November 1997) is a Ukrainian actress and activist. She is known for her roles as Cadet Viktoriya in the science fiction monster film Pacific Rim Uprising (2018), the hitwoman Nadedja in the 2018 action comedy film The Spy Who Dumped Me, and Shin Hati in 2023's Ahsoka television series. She had already achieved certain prominence in Ukraine after appearing in 2005 in the first ever Ukrainian-language sitcom, Lesia + Roma, and the 2013 biopic Ivan the Powerful.

== Early life ==
Ivanna Sakhno was born in Kyiv, Ukraine, on 14 November 1997 to a family of local filmmakers. Her parents are Halyna Kuvivchak-Sakhno, a director, and Anatolii Sakhno, a cinematographer.

Her dream of acting started in 2004 when she watched the film Amélie. At the age of 13, Ivanna Sakhno left Ukraine to study English in Vancouver. It was there she was discovered by Janet Hirshenson and Jane Jenkins at a casting workshop. Sakhno moved to the United States in 2013, settling in Hollywood to pursue an acting career. While there she studied at Beverly Hills High School and later at the Lee Strasberg Theatre and Film Institute, working with Ivana Chubbuck.

== Career ==
Sakhno's first television appearance was in the 2005 series Lesya + Roma (a Ukrainian adaptation of the successful Canadian sitcom Un gars, une fille) and her debut feature film role was as "Milka" in the 2013 biopic film, Ivan the Powerful.

Her first major Hollywood role was in Thomas Dunn's 2016 thriller film The Body Tree. She followed this with roles in two big budget 2018 releases, Pacific Rim Uprising and The Spy Who Dumped Me.

In 2019, Sakhno was a member of the jury of the International Competition Program of the 10th Odesa International Film Festival. In August 2020, she was a member of the jury of the 49th Molodist Film Festival.

In 2020, she made her first appearance in an American television series when she performed opposite Zoë Kravitz in the Hulu series High Fidelity. In the same year she starred in the thriller film Let it Snow, directed by Ukrainian filmmaker Stanislav Kapralov. She also appeared in the 2022 French limited series La jeune fille et la nuit (The Reunion).

In November 2021, she was cast in the Disney+ series Ahsoka, which is part of the Star Wars franchise.

== Activism ==
At the 2015 Cannes Film Festival, Sakhno expressed her support for Ukrainian political prisoners held by Russian authorities.

Following the Russian invasion of Ukraine on 24 February 2022, Sakhno publicly condemned Russia's actions and supported her country. In February 2023, she spoke at The Lincoln Memorial in Washington D.C. in support of Ukraine. In April, Sakhno discussed the Russo-Ukrainian War on Morning Joe and how Americans can help affected Ukrainians. She also was a participant in the Artists for Ukraine fundraising event showcasing Ukrainian art to benefit Ukrainian children displaced by the war. She became an Ambassador of Ukraine's official fundraising platform United24 in the Education and Science direction in May.

Sakhno avoids playing Russian characters. During the COVID-19 lockdowns period, she broke a contract with Netflix that would have required her to portray a person with a Soviet Russian background.

== Filmography ==
=== Film ===
| Year | Title | Role | Notes | Ref. |
|---|---|---|---|---|
| 2013 | Ivan the Powerful | Mills | Ukrainian film | |
| 2016 | The Body Tree | Helen | | |
| 2017 | Can't Take It Back | Morgan Rose | | |
| 2018 | Pacific Rim Uprising | Cadet Viktoriya | | |
| 2018 | The Spy Who Dumped Me | Nadedja | | |
| 2020 | Let It Snow | Mia | | |
| 2025 | M3GAN 2.0 | Amelia | | |
| TBA | Ibelin | TBA | Filming | |

=== Television ===
| Year | Title | Role | Notes | Ref. |
|---|---|---|---|---|
| 2005 | Lesya + Roma | | | |
| 2006 | Zhenskie slyozy | | Television film | |
| 2008 | Uchitel muzyki | Sasha | Television film | |
| 2008 | Muzhchina dlya zhizni, ili Na brak ne pretenduyu | Jen'ka | Television film | |
| 2009 | Kontrakt | | Television film | |
| 2009 | Veskoe osnovanie dlya ubiystva | 12 Year Old Sasha | Miniseries | |
| 2011 | Babye leto | Masha | | |
| 2013 | Frodya | | Miniseries | |
| 2016 | Chornyi Tsvetok | Young Lera | Miniseries | |
| 2020 | High Fidelity | Kat Monroe | 2 episodes | |
| 2022 | La jeune fille et la nuit (The Reunion) | Vinca Rockwell / Pauline | Miniseries | |
| 2023–present | Star Wars: Ahsoka | Shin Hati | Main role | |
| 2025 | The Mighty Nein | Astrid (voice) | Guest star | |

=== Music videos ===
| Year | Title | Artist | Role(s) | Ref. |
|---|---|---|---|---|
| 2016 | Bang Bang | Green Day | Bank Robber | Revolution Radio |
| 2023 | Eat Your Young | Hozier | The Woman | |
