= Charlotte Le Bon =

Canadian actress and director (born 1986)

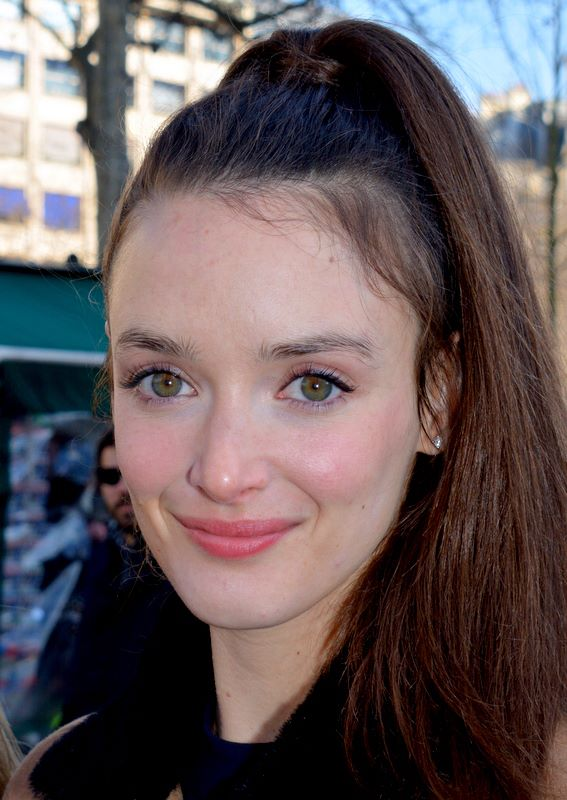
- Le Bon in 2015
- Born: 4 September 1986 (age 40); Montreal, Quebec, Canada
- Occupations: Actress, model, television presenter
- Years active: 2007–present
- Website: lebonlebon.com

Charlotte Le Bon (French pronunciation: [ʃaʁlɔt lə bɔ̃]; born 4 September 1986) is a Canadian actress and director based in Paris. She is known for her work in the Canal+ talk show Le Grand Journal, and the films Yves Saint Laurent, The Hundred-Foot Journey, and The Walk.

Falcon Lake, her feature film directorial debut, premiered in the Directors' Fortnight program at the 2022 Cannes Film Festival. It also screened at the 2022 Toronto International Film Festival. For her work on Falcon Lake, Le Bon won the award for Emerging Canadian Director at the 2022 Vancouver International Film Festival.

== Early life ==
Le Bon was born in 1986 in Montreal, to Brigitte Paquette and Richard Le Bon. Her mother and her stepfather, Frank Schorpion, are both actors. After studying visual arts, she began modelling at 16 years old and left Canada when she was 19 to model overseas.

== Career ==
After spending brief periods in Tokyo and New York City, she eventually settled in Paris in 2010. She never enjoyed modelling, however, saying that "I was a model for eight years and really hated it." She then started doing ads for brands such as Si Lolita, Carte Noire and Garnier Fructis.

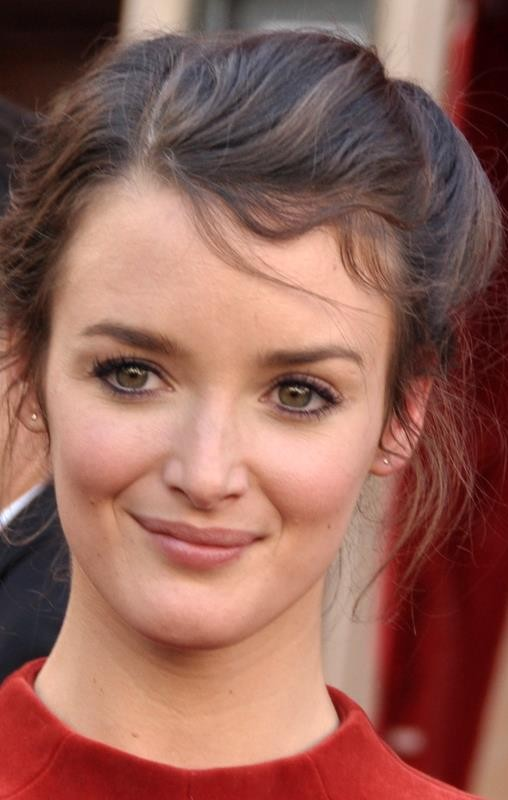
Le Bon in 2012

Soon after, Le Bon was cast as "Miss Météo" on Le Grand Journal, a news- and pop culture-based talk show on the French television channel Canal+, where she did daily weather reports in the form of comedy skits she wrote herself. Although the network wanted her back for a second season, she declined their offer in favour of embarking on a movie career.

Le Bon's first film role was in the 2012 French comedy Asterix and Obelix: God Save Britannia. In 2013, she appeared in Mood Indigo and The Marchers, and in 2014 she starred as Yves Saint Laurent's muse Victoire Doutreleau in the biographical film Yves Saint Laurent, earning a nomination for a César Award.

Le Bon's first role in an English-language film was in The Hundred-Foot Journey (2014), a romantic comedy directed by Lasse Hallström in which she plays a chef-in-training at an upscale French restaurant alongside Helen Mirren.

Le Bon was cast with Joseph Gordon-Levitt in The Walk, a film directed by Robert Zemeckis and based on Philippe Petit's famous tightrope walk in 1974, released in 2015. In 2015, she dubbed the voice of Joy in both the European French and Canadian French dubs of the Pixar film Inside Out.

In 2016, she appeared in six films. The Promise matched her with Christian Bale and Oscar Isaac in a story based on events that occurred during the Armenian Genocide. She also played in the science fiction film Realive, the World War II film Anthropoid, and the action movie Bastille Day with Idris Elba. She also maintained her profile in France by starring in two French films, Arctic Heart and Iris (where she reunited with director Jalil Lespert).

Le Bon made her directorial debut with the short film Judith Hotel, which premiered at the 2018 Cannes Film Festival. Her feature film directorial debut Falcon Lake, adapted from the graphic novel Une sœur by Bastien Vivès, premiered in the Director's Fortnight program at the 2022 Cannes Film Festival. It also screened at the 2022 Toronto International Film Festival. For her work on Falcon Lake, LeBon won the award for Emerging Canadian Director at the 2022 Vancouver International Film Festival.

Trained in the field of visual arts, Le Bon has actively pursued a parallel career as an illustrator and street artist. She began as an artist for Spank, an online magazine founded by her on-air colleague at Canal+ Raphaël Cioffi, who hired her to do drawings to accompany certain articles. As part of the 2011 commemoration of the 30th anniversary of the March for Equality and Against Racism, she collaborated with French artist JR in organizing the Inside Out Project, in which 2500 black & white portraits were posted in Lyon in December 2013. She subsequently maintained a sporadic involvement in street art by creating works that allow audience interaction, such as moons on strings that can be unhooked by passers-by (on the streets of Paris and in New York City's Rikers Island prison).

In September 2016, she confirmed her return to illustrating with an exhibit called "One Bedroom Hotel on the Moon" at Anne-Dominique Toussaint's Galerie Cinéma in Paris. In an interview with The New York Times, she explained that this exhibit symbolizes the merging of melancholy and hope: "the expression of a poetic isolation".

== Personal life ==
Le Bon is bilingual in French and English, and lives in Paris.

== Filmography ==
=== Film ===
| Year | Title | Role | Notes |
|---|---|---|---|
| 2012 | Asterix and Obelix: God Save Britannia | Ophélia | |
| 2012 | The Stroller Strategy | Marie Deville | |
| 2013 | Mood Indigo | Isis | |
| 2013 | The Big Bad Wolf | Natacha | |
| 2013 | The Marchers | Claire | |
| 2014 | Yves Saint Laurent | Victoire Doutreleau | Nominated—César Award for Best Supporting Actress |
| 2014 | Nice and Easy | Anna | |
| 2014 | The Hundred-Foot Journey | Marguerite | |
| 2015 | Inside Out | Joy (Joie) | Voice role (French and Canadian French dub) |
| 2015 | The Walk | Annie | |
| 2016 | Arctic Heart | Christophine | |
| 2016 | Bastille Day | Zoe Naville | known as The Take in North America and the UK |
| 2016 | Anthropoid | Marie Kovárníková | |
| 2016 | The Promise | Anna Khesarian | |
| 2016 | Iris | Claudia / Iris | |
| 2016 | Realive | Elizabeth | |
| 2019 | Berlin, I Love You | Rose | |
| 2021 | Warning | Charlotte | |
| 2022 | Fresh | Ann | |
| 2024 | Inside Out 2 | Joy (Joie) | Voice role (French and Canadian French dub) |
| 2024 | Niki | Niki de Saint Phalle | |
| 2026 | Full Phil | Lucie | |

Key
| † | Denotes films that have not yet been released |

=== Film (as director) ===
| Year | Title | Notes |
|---|---|---|
| 2022 | Falcon Lake | Also screenwriter |

=== Television ===
| Year | Title | Role | Notes |
|---|---|---|---|
| 2010–2011 | Le Grand Journal | Herself, weather girl | Nightly news show |
| 2012 | Le Petit Journal | | 2 episodes |
| 2013 | Le Débarquement | | 1 episode |
| 2013–2015 | Hubert & Takako | Takako | Voice |
| 2019 | Cheyenne et Lola | Lola | Title role |
| 2022 | Happily Married | Grazia | 6 episodes |
| 2025 | The White Lotus | Chloe | |

=== Music videos ===
- "Desencuentro" (2017), by Residente
