= Giraffe (novel) =

Scottish novel

- Book cover
- Author: J.M. Ledgard
- Language: English
- Genre: Genre fiction
- Published: 2006
- ISBN: 978-1594200991

Giraffe is a debut novel by Scottish writer J.M. Ledgard.

== Plot summary ==
Giraffe is based on a true Czechoslovak story, which Ledgard discovered while working as a journalist in the Czech Republic for The Economist in 2001. In 1975, on the eve of May Day, Czechoslovak secret police dressed in chemical warfare suits sealed off the zoo in the Czech town of Dvůr Králové nad Labem and orchestrated the slaying of the zoo's entire population of forty-nine giraffes – the largest captive herd in the world. No reason for the action was ever given, and discussion of the incident was suppressed. It remains a state secret in the Czech Republic. Ledgard recounts the story of the giraffes from their capture in Africa to their deaths far away in the Eastern Bloc.

== Reception ==
Giraffe was published in 2006 by Penguin Press in the United States, Jonathan Cape in Britain, and Héloïse d'Ormesson in France. Czech, Dutch, and English-language paperback editions appeared in 2007. While some reviewers found Giraffe stilted and sombre, the majority praised it as a masterpiece. The novel was named a 2006 Book of the Year by the Library Journal, and as a novel of the year by newspapers on both sides of the Atlantic.

The Library Journal found Giraffe to be "a profoundly affecting novel that will wake you up and break your heart." The reviewer for the United Kingdom'sThe Independent described it as a "superb novel, filled with compassion, yet never sentimental." The Chicago Tribune critic likened Giraffe to T. S. Eliot's The Waste Land, while the review in the Atlanta Journal-Constitution thought Ledgard's prose closer to that of Italo Calvino. Other reviews drew comparison with the German writer, W. G. Sebald. The reviewer from The Plain Dealer argued that Giraffe is "a potent, disturbing dream, as if Radiohead's 'Idioteque' had mixed with something by Haruki Murakami." The New York Times critic was "continually reminded of Harold Bloom's remark about all great books being strange."

According to one of the novel's publishers, Penguin Press, "Giraffe marks the debut of an unforgettable talent.... At once vivid and unearthly, Giraffe is a meditation on suffering, on the strangeness of vertical creatures, and on the inhabitants of a middling totalitarian state, sleepwalking through the ‘communist moment’."

== Sources ==
- Penguin Books Summer 2007 catalog, accessed 4 February 2007
- Review by Karen Long in The Plain Dealer (Cleveland, Ohio)
- Review by Nicholas Royle in The Independent
- The tragic story of the disappearing giraffes by David Vaughan at Radio Prague
- Review in Modern Mask
- Penguin Reading Guide
