= List of exhibitions by Federico Díaz =

This list of selected exhibitions by Federico Díaz includes both group and solo exhibitions.

== Group exhibitions ==
- 1992
  - Festival International de la Video et des Arts Electroniques, Locarno Lago Maggiore, Switzerland
  - N.E.C., Videofestival, Tokyo, Japan
- 1993
  - International Contemporary Art Forum, ARCO, Madrid, Spain (February 1993)
  - Alexander-Dorner-Kreis, Kubus, Hannover, Germany:10 Jahre Festival Video, Gran Canaria, Spain
- 1994
  - Landesgalerie im O.Ö. Landesmuseum Francisco Carolinum, Austria Tabakwerke, Linz, Austria: Netz Europa 9. 9.–16. 10. / ISBN 3-901112-05-7
  - Munich, Germany: Europa 94, Junge Europäische Kunst in München 10. 9.–20. 10.
  - Galerie hlavního města Prahy, Dům U Kamenného zvonu, Prague, CZ: Zvon ’94. Bienále mladého umění 17.12.1994–8.2.1995. / ISBN 80-7010-032-X
- 1995
  - Výstavní síň Mánes, Prague, CZ: Zkušební provoz / Test Run. Má umění mladé? / Does art have young ones? 25.4.–17.5.1995 / ISBN 80-85433-26-5
  - Národní galerie v Praze, Valdštejnská jízdárna, Prague, CZ: Orbis Fictus. Nová média v současném umění 30. 11. 1995–1. 1. 1996.
  - Moravské zemské muzeum, Brno, CZ: Hi-tech / Umění Kunstmuseum Düsseldorf im Ehrenhof, Düsseldorf, Germany, Kunstakademie
- 1996
  - Richterova vila, Prague, CZ: Respekt – Vzpomínky na budoucnost 19. 6.–7. 7. 1996.
  - Dům umění města Brna, Brno, CZ: Hi-tech / Umění 17.10.–30.10.
- 1997
  - Starý královský palác, gotické podlaží, Prague, CZ: Cena Jindřicha Chalupeckého pro rok 1997 – Veronika Bromová, Jiří Černický, Federico Díaz, Roman Franta, Jiří Příhoda 21. 11.–14. 12.
- 1998
  - Galerie hlavního města Prahy, Dům U Zlatého prstenu, Prague, CZ: Současné umění: Contemporary Collection – Czech Art in the ’90s (1998–2000) / . ISBN 80-7010-061-3
  - Hall des Chars Laiterie, Strasbourg, France: Lanterne magique, artistes tcheques et nouvelles technologies 25. 9.–25. 10.
  - Passage de Retz, Paris, France: L’Art du Monde 98 29. 4.–13. 6.
- 1999
  - Výstavní síň Mánes, Prague, CZ: Neplánované spojení. Stipendisté Nadace Jana a Milan Jelínek 1990–1998 18. 2.–12. 3. 1999 / ISBN 80-239-5438-5
  - Galerie Rudolfinum, Prague, CZ: Crossings 24. 6.–12. 9.
- 2000
  - Národní galerie v Praze, Palác Kinských, Prague, CZ: Konec světa? / The End of the World? 26. 5.–19. 11. 2000 / ISBN 80-7035-210-8
  - Pražský hrad, Prague, CZ: ENTERmultimediale 31. 5.–3. 6.
  - Dům umění ve Zlíně, Zlín, CZ: II. Zlínský salon mladých 1. 6.–15. 10. / ISBN 80-85052-35-0
  - Galerie hlavního města Prahy, Městská knihovna, Prague, CZ: Aktuální nekonečno / Actual Infinity 27.9.–30.12.2000 / ISBN 978-80-7010-067-7
  - Národní galerie, Sbírka moderního a současného umění, Veletržní palác, Prague, CZ, Proměny řádu: chaos a řád > 8. 9.–6. 11.
- 2001
  - PAC a Triennale di Milano, Milan, Italy: Milano Europa 2000 19. 5.–16. 9. 2001 / . ISBN 88-435-7898-7
  - Moravská galerie v Brně, Pražákův palác, Brno, CZ: Možná sdělení 16. 10.–30. 12. 2001 / ISBN 80-7027-111-6
  - Divadlo Archa (et al.), Prague, CZ: Datatransfer, festival kyberkultury 12. 11.–24. 11. 2001.
- 2002
  - Musée des Beaux-Arts de Nancy, Nancy, France: Corps et traces dans la création tchèque 1962–2002, 9. 9.–18. 11. 2002/ ISBN 2-85025-832-6
  - Dům umění města Brna, Brno, CZ: Cena J. Chalupeckého, finále: Markéta Baňková, Federico Díaz, Lenka Klodová, Markéta Othová 18. 10. 2002–5. 1. 2003.
  - Espace EDF Electra, Paris, France: Lanterna Magika: nouvelles technologies dans l’art tchèque du XXe siècle 26. 10. 2002–19. 1. 2003/ ISBN 80-86217-36-1
- 2003
  - České muzeum výtvarných umění, Prague, CZ: ...o technice.../...about technology... 2. 7.–14. 9. 2003/ ISBN 80-7056-104-1
  - Landesmuseum Bonn, Galerie der Stadt Remscheid, Bonn, Germany: Aus Liebe. Die Generation der 90er Jahre in Prag 27. 9.–30. 11
  - Moravská galerie v Brně, Uměleckoprůmyslové muzeum a Místodržitelský palác, Brno, CZ: Ejhle světlo 17. 10. 2003–29. 2.
  - Museo de Bellas Artes, Buenos Aires, Argentina, Arte i Cybernetica,1.10- 1.11.
- 2004
  - Jízdárna Pražského hradu, Prague, CZ: Ejhle světlo 26. 3.–6. 6. 2004/. ISBN 80-7027-118-3; 80-86217-61-2
  - Galerie kritiků, Prague, CZ: V mezičase / In time between 7. 4.–7. 5
  - Galerie kritiků, Prague, CZ: Vision, Prague/Tokyo 10. 8.–12. 9.
  - Gallery Vision, Gallery Toki, Tokyo, Japan: Vision, Prague/Tokyo (podzim 2004)
  - ZKM (Zentrum für Kunst und Medientechnologie), Karlsruhe, Germany: Die Algorithmische Revolution 31. 10. 2004–6. 1. 2008.
  - Galerie Futura, Prague, CZ: Objectually Speaking 10. 12. 2004–6. 2.2005
- 2005
  - Sumida River Hall, Tokyo and Aichi, Japan: EXPO 2005 25. 3.–25. 9.
  - Museum Kampa, Prague, CZ: Com.bi.nacion: Science meets Art 4. 7.–4. 9. 2005/ ISBN 80-239-5316-8
  - Ars Electronica 2005, Linz, Austria: Hybrid – Living in paradox 1. 9.–6. 9. 2005/ ISBN 3-7757-1659-9
  - Museum Kampa, Prague, CZ: Turbulence 14. 11. 2005–1. 1. 2006.
  - ZKM (Zentrum für Kunst und Medientechnologie), Karlsruhe, Germany: Lichtkunst aus Kunstlicht 19. 11. 2005–6. 8. 2006.
- 2007
  - City Gallery Prague / Galerie Hlavního Města Prahy, Prague, Space for intuition/Prostor pro intuici > 17. 10. 2007–2. 12. 2007
- 2008
  - Futura, Karlin Studios, Prague, Intro 518 Now 69 Now Now 180 Bonus Q >

5. 6. - 29. 5. 2008

- 2009
  - Mori Art museum, Tokyo, JP, Ropongi Art Night > 28.3.- 29.3. 2009
  - DOX Centre for Contemporary Art, Prague, My Europe > 07.10 – 18.11 2009
  - DOX Centre for Contemporary Art, Prague, 14 S - Fourteen artists, fourteen themes > 23. 5. - 16. 8. 2009
- 2010
  - Expo 2010, Shanghai, China > 1.5-30.10.2010
- 2011
  - 54th Venice Biennale, Venezia, IT, Federico Díaz : Outside Itself >4.6 -30.9.2011/ ISBN 978-88-8158-822-0
  - Galerie Zdeněk Sklenář, Prague, CZ, Krajiná, Karel Malich Federico Díaz Evžen Šimera Jan Martinec, Jonáš Strouhal > 27. 7. - 15. 10. 2011
- 2012
  - Biennial of Art and Technology 06, Itau Cultural, São Paulo, BR, Emoção Art.ficial [Art.ficial Emotion] 30.5. – 29.6.
- 2015
  - Pori Art Museum, Pori, Finland, KAREL MALICH & FEDERICO DÍAZ, 06.02.2015 - 24.05.2015

== Solo exhibitions ==
- 1997
  - Galerie hlavního města Prahy, Staroměstská radnice, Prague, CZ: Tacuzcanzcan > 29. 5.–20. 7.
- 1998
  - Galerie Václava Špály, Prague, CZ > Bolb 30. 9.–1. 11.
- 1998
  - Royal Institute of British Architects (RIBA), London, GB: Introsphere E AREA > 3. 3.–31. 3.
- 2000
  - Národní galerie, Veletržní palác – Malá dvorana, Prague, CZ: Federico Díaz: E-mpact >13. 12. 2000–18. 2..2001
- 2002
  - Moravská galerie v Brně, Uměleckoprůmyslové muzeum, Brno, CZ: Mnemeg > 15. 11.–15. 12.
- 2005
  - ICA (Institute of Contemporary Arts), London, GB: Sembion > 28. 2. - 6. 3.
- 2006
  - Galerie Zdeněk Sklenář, Prague, CZ, Fluid F1 > 15. 2.–1. 4.
- 2007
  - Galerie Zdeněk Sklenář, Prague, CZ, Resonance >16. 7.–31. 8.
- 2008
  - Miami Art Basel, Art Positions, PS1/ MoMA, Miami, US : Federico Diaz / Ultra, radio WPS1 MoMA > 3.-8.12.2008/ ISBN 978-88-8158-721-6
- 2009
  - Frederieke Taylor Gallery, New York City, US, Adhesion > 15.9 – 17.10 2009
  - Galerie Zdenek Sklenar, Prague, CZ, Federico Díaz: Adhesion / Survival Manual / Chapter > 1.1. - 1 4. 9. - 3. 10. 2009
- 2010
  - MASS MoCA/ Massachusetts Museum of Contemporary Art, North Adams, US, Federico Diaz : Geometric Death Frequency 141 > 23.10 2008 – 20. 4 2012/ ISBN 978-88-8158-793-3
- 2011
  - Galerie Zdenek Sklenar, Prague, CZ, Federico Diaz : Outside Itself > 23. 11. - 24. 12. 2011
- 2014
  - CAFA Museum, Beijing, China, Federico Diaz: You Welded the Ornament of the Times > November 2014
