= Federico Díaz (footballer) =

Argentine footballer (born 1992)

Personal information
- Full name: Federico Leonardo Díaz
- Date of birth: 14 April 1992 (age 34)
- Place of birth: Buenos Aires, Argentina
- Height: 1.85 m (6 ft 1 in)
- Position: Goalkeeper

Team information
- Current team: Deportivo Morón

Youth career
- 1996–2010: Los Andes

Senior career*
Years	Team	Apps	(Gls)
2010–2021	Los Andes	24	(0)
2015	→ Estudiantes BA (loan)	0	(0)
2021–2022	Sportivo Desamparados	14	(0)
2022–2024	Brown de Adrogué	6	(0)
2024–2025	Flandria	42	(0)
2025–2026	Sportivo Italiano	42	(0)
2026–	Deportivo Morón	0	(0)
- * Club domestic league appearances and goals as of 17:29, 27 April 2026 (UTC)

Federico Leonardo Díaz (born 14 April 1992) is an Argentine professional footballer who plays as a goalkeeper for Deportivo Morón.

== Career ==
Díaz's career began with Los Andes, a club he signed for in 1996. He was a professional from 2010 but didn't make an appearance in Primera B Metropolitana. In 2015, Díaz was loaned to Estudiantes. No league matches followed, though he did feature twice in the Copa Argentina versus Dock Sud and San Martín respectively. Having returned to Los Andes, his bow eventually arrived in Primera B Nacional in June 2017 against Flandria; he had been an unused substitute in that division fifty-four times before his debut. Díaz made a total of ten appearances during the 2016–17 campaign.

After a spell at Sportivo Desamparados in 2021, Díaz moved to Primera Nacional club Brown de Adrogué ahead of the 2022 season.

== Career statistics ==
As of 11 February 2019.

Club statistics
Club	Season	League			Cup		Continental		Other		Total	
Club	Season	Division	Apps	Goals	Apps	Goals	Apps	Goals	Apps	Goals	Apps	Goals
Los Andes	2010–11	Primera B Metropolitana	0	0	0	0	—		0	0	0	0
Los Andes	2011–12	Primera B Metropolitana	0	0	0	0	—		0	0	0	0
Los Andes	2012–13	Primera B Metropolitana	0	0	0	0	—		0	0	0	0
Los Andes	2013–14	Primera B Metropolitana	0	0	0	0	—		0	0	0	0
Los Andes	2014	Primera B Metropolitana	0	0	0	0	—		0	0	0	0
Los Andes	2015	Primera B Nacional	0	0	0	0	—		0	0	0	0
Los Andes	2016	Primera B Nacional	0	0	0	0	—		0	0	0	0
Los Andes	2016–17	Primera B Nacional	10	0	0	0	—		0	0	10	0
Los Andes	2017–18	Primera B Nacional	0	0	0	0	—		0	0	0	0
Los Andes	2018–19	Primera B Nacional	2	0	0	0	—		0	0	2	0
Los Andes	Total		12	0	0	0	—		0	0	12	0
Estudiantes (loan)	2015	Primera B Metropolitana	0	0	2	0	—		0	0	2	0
Career total			12	0	2	0	—		0	0	14	0
