= Submergence (novel) =

2013 novel by J. M. Ledgard

- First edition (UK)
- Author: J.M. Ledgard
- Language: English
- Genre: Contemporary fiction
- Published: 2011
- Publisher: Jonathan Cape
- Pages: 208
- ISBN: 978-0099555384

Submergence is the second novel by the Scottish novelist J.M. Ledgard. Alternately a love story, a spy story, and an exploration of the ocean, Submergence was published in 2011 by Jonathan Cape in the United Kingdom and in 2013 by Coffee House in America. There are numerous translations including in Spanish, Portuguese, Russian, Turkish, and Thai.

== Plot summary ==
Submergence tells the story of an Australian-French professor of biomathematics at Imperial College, Danielle Flinders, and a British MI6 spy, James More. They meet and fall in love at a hotel on a wild stretch of the Atlantic coast of France. The novel alternates between the hotel and Danielle's scientific expedition to the sea floor and James's captivity in Somalia. "Running separately and together, their stories become dramatic explorations of conditions far larger than their individual destinies—a meditation on our species and our planet at a time heavily shadowed by the prospect of extinction," said Philip Gourevitch in The New Yorker. Ledgard has said he wanted to show that "there is another world in our world - the 99% of the living space in our planet that is in the sea."

== Research ==
J.M. Ledgard spent time in al-Qaeda Shabab occupied areas of Somalia while researching the novel. On one trip, the Shabab were beheading enemies in the next town. Born in the Shetland Islands, Ledgard had a fascination with the ocean. He was a visiting fellow at the Woods Hole Oceanographic Institution and studied chemosynthetic life in the deep sea.

== Reception ==
The novel was received with acclaim, with The Irish Times saying it deserved to be one of the strongest contenders for the Booker Prize though ultimately it was not shortlisted. In the U.S. it was a New York Times Book of the Year, and a pick of the year by Publishers Weekly, Library Journal, NPR, Rainy Day, and others. Kathryn Schulz in New York said it was "the best novel I've read this year." The sci-fi writer Jeff Van Der Meer said Submergence "contained more interesting ideas about science and philosophy than any science-fiction novel I've read in the past decade."

The book was adapted into a 2017 film by director Wim Wenders. The film adaptation received generally unfavorable reviews and was a box office bomb.
