= J. M. Ledgard =

British born novelist (born 1968)

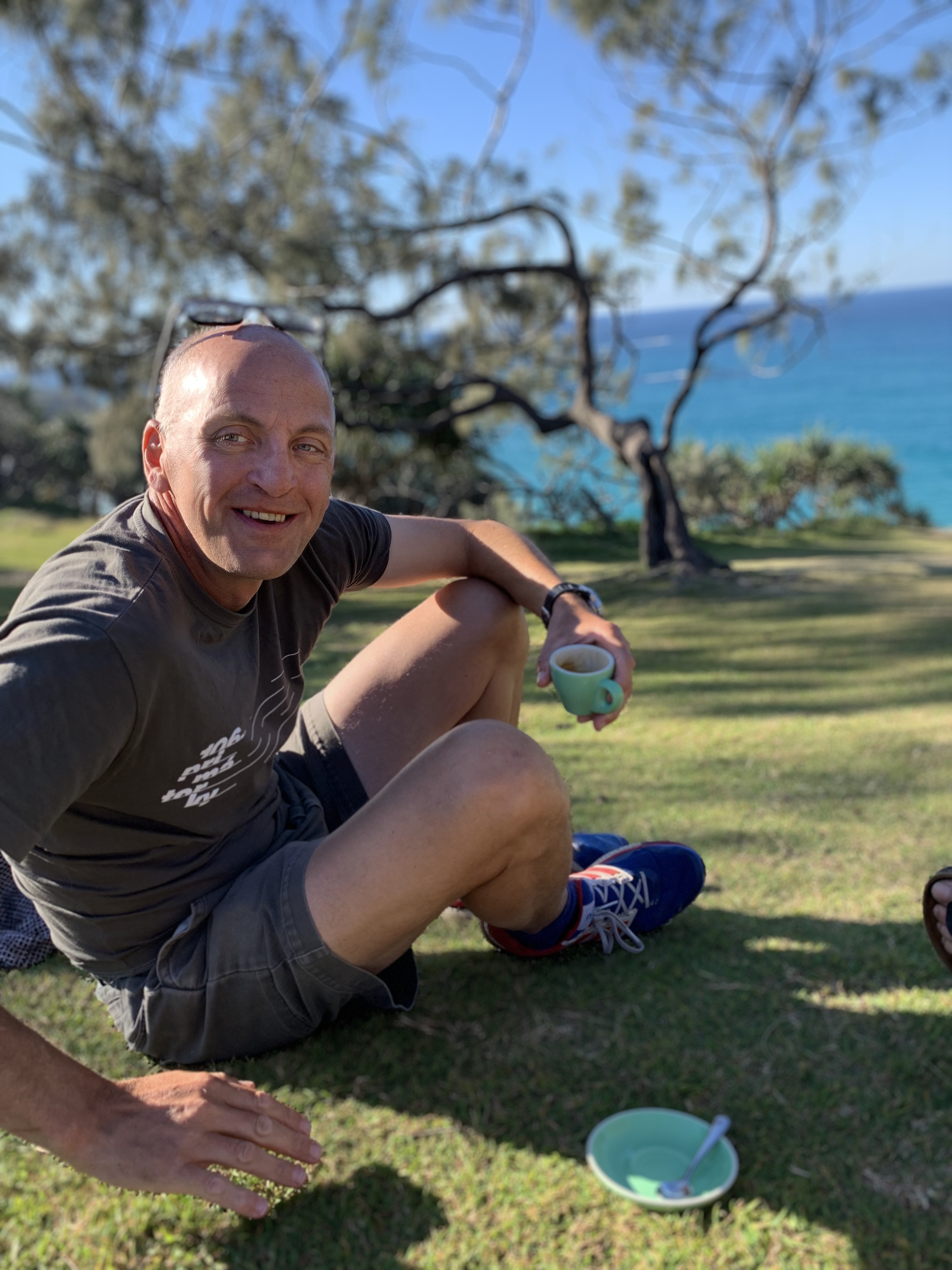
- Born: 1968 (age 57–58); Shetland Islands
- Occupations: Novelist, technologist, foreign and war correspondent
- Notable work: Giraffe (novel), Submergence (novel)

J. M. Ledgard (born 1968) is a British born novelist and an expert in advanced technology, nature, and risk in emerging markets. He also works with conceptual artists.

== Early life ==
Ledgard was born in the Shetland Islands, off the north coast of Scotland, in 1968.

== Career ==
=== Foreign and War Correspondent ===
After reporting on the Romanian revolution for The Scotsman as a student, he worked as a foreign political and war correspondent for two decades. He reported lead stories from 60 countries for The Economist, including stints in Asia, Latin America, Eastern Europe, and Africa. His emphasis was on security, natural resources, and macroeconomics. He reported on several conflicts and is a founder member of The Frontline Club. He was a contributing writer to 1843, The Economist's sister magazine. He writes occasional long pieces for The Atlantic and other publications.

=== Novelist ===
Ledgard is the author of two novels, Giraffe (2006) and Submergence (2013), which was made into a film in 2017 of the same name by Wim Wenders. His work has been compared to W.G. Sebald and John Le Carré. Submergence was a New York Times Book of the Year and a pick of the year by Publishers Weekly, Library Journal, NPR, and New York. Giraffe is considered a cult novel in the animal rights movement. A book of essays, Terra Firma, concerned Africa and technology.

=== Futurist ===
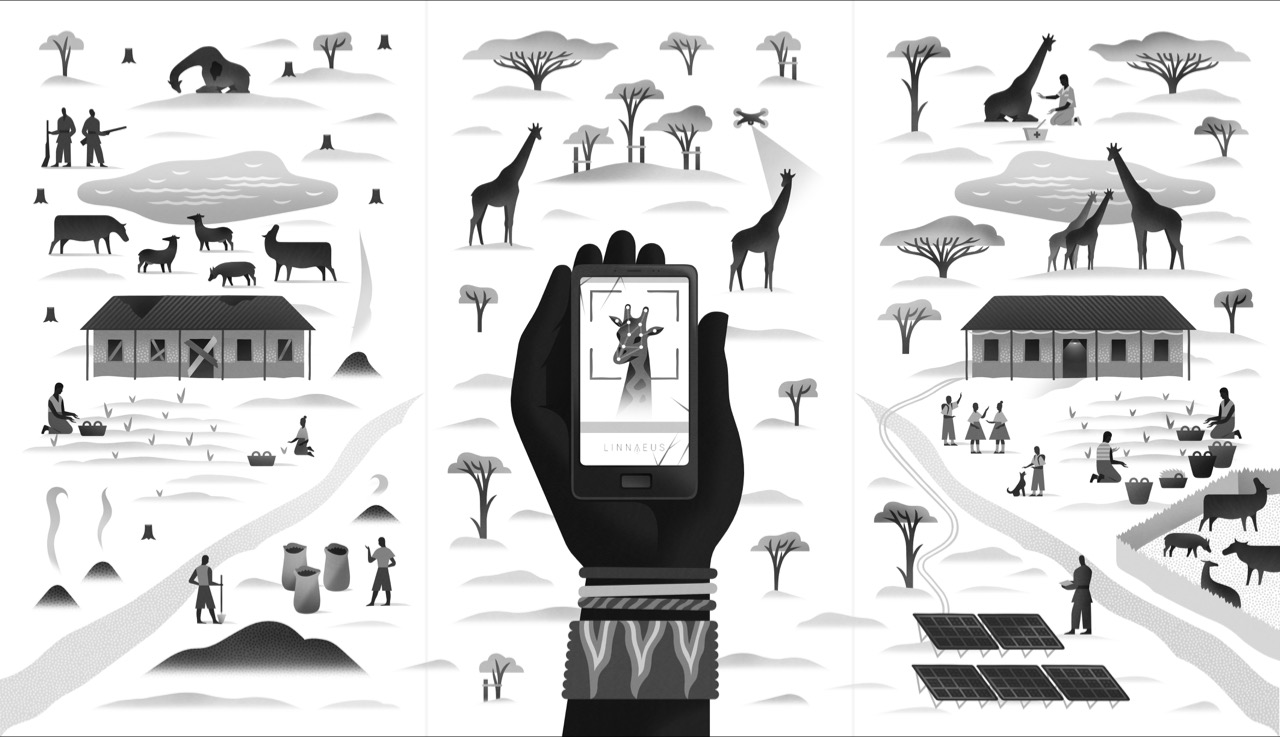
Linnaeus, a prototype for interspecies money transfer

He was a fellow and director at the École Polytechnique Fédérale de Lausanne since 2012, and has been involved in promoting super advanced technology in Africa. He works with leading artificial intelligence scientists and roboticists to improve outcomes in often very poor communities and for nature. He was an early proponent of drone technology. He invented the concept of blood delivery by drone, introducing the American startup Zipline into Rwanda. He advanced the idea of droneports across the tropics, realising together with the architect Lord Norman Foster a droneport prototype at the 2016 Venice Biennale. His cargo drone work has been taken up and scaled by the World Bank, the UN and commercial partners. He supports digital self-sovereignty and was involved in early mobile money. Since 2018, he has been focused on how artificial intelligence will perceive nature. He was a visiting professor in AI and Nature at the Czech Technical University. He is presently developing a prototype for interspecies money, by which rare non-human life forms may revalue themselves to improve their chance of survival. He is an early proponent of the interspecies, an attempt to better comprehend other species using new technologies. He is a fellow of the Linnean Society and was a visiting fellow at the Woods Hole Oceanographic Institution.

=== Art ===
He collaborates with major artists on nature based projects, including on the deep ocean and digital futures with Olafur Eliasson, on the interspecies with Tomas Saraceno, and Federico Diaz on nature based projects.
