= Victoire Doutreleau =

French former model (born 1934)

Victoire Doutreleau (nee Jeanne Devis, born 1934) is a French former model, who worked extensively for Christian Dior and Yves Saint Laurent.

== Early life ==
Doutreleau was born in 1934.

== Career ==
Doutreleau began working for Christian Dior in the early 1950s, aged 18, and he renamed her as Victoire Doutreleau. Richard Avedon reportedly said that she had "the most beautiful breasts in the world". In 1960, she joined YSL after Yves Saint Laurent started his own atelier.

In 2014, she published a memoir, Et Dior Créa Victoire (And Dior Created Victoire).

== Personal life ==
Doutreleau had a three-year relationship with Pierre Bergé. She was involved in an intense friendship with Yves Saint Laurent at the same time, and was "the only woman the designer considered marrying".
