= Federico Díaz (artist) =

Czech-Argentine artist (born 1971)

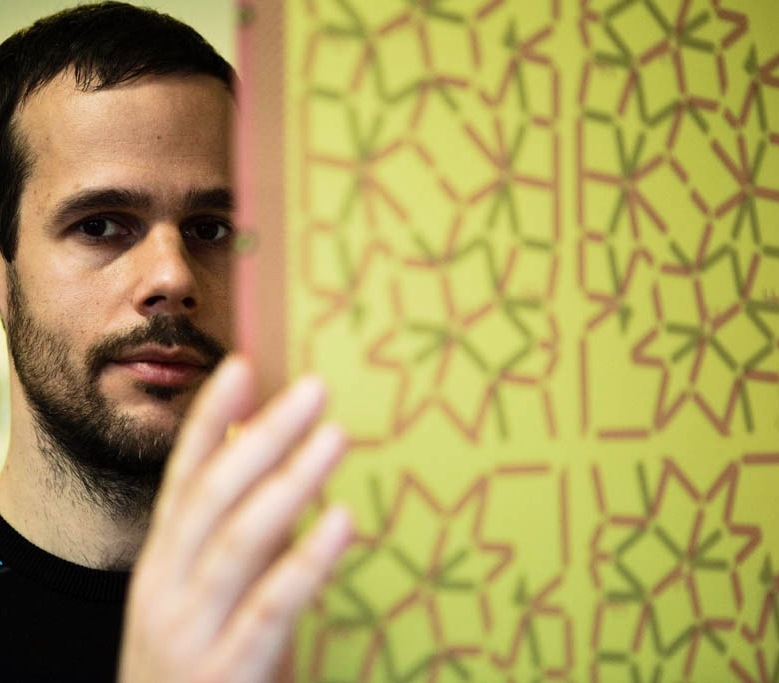
- Federico Díaz in 2010
- Born: 18 July 1971 (age 54)
- Education: Academy of Fine Arts, Prague
- Known for: Systems art, site-specific art, installation art, architecture, AI, robotic art
- Notable work: Outside Itself, Geometric Death Frequency-141, Sembion, Generatrix, Sakura, Big Light, Subtile Sacramento

Federico Díaz (born July 18, 1971) is a Czech-Argentine artist whose work incorporates media and technologies.

He lives and works in Prague, Czech Republic, and has exhibited internationally.

From 2007 to 2014, Díaz headed the Supermedia Studio at the Academy of Arts, Architecture and Design.

== Education and artistic career ==
Díaz graduated from the Academy of Fine Arts, Prague (1990–1997).

He was a lecturer at Masaryk University in Brno, where he helped establish the Digital Media specialization at the Faculty of Social Studies. In Prague, he founded the Supermedia Studio at the Academy of Arts, Architecture and Design (AAAD) with Rafani art group member David Kořínek.

Díaz's first solo exhibition was held at the City Gallery Prague in 1997, followed by later exhibitions in the Czech Republic at the Moravian Gallery in Brno, Mánes Exhibition Hall, Prague Castle Riding School, the National Gallery in Prague, and the Brno House of Arts.

He has also exhibited at the Institute of Contemporary Arts and the Royal Institute of British Architects in London, ZKM Center for Art and Media Karlsruhe (2004), Fondation Electricité de France in Paris (2003), Ars Electronica Festival in Linz (2005), and the Mori Art Museum in Tokyo (2005). His works were exhibited at MASS MoCA in North Adams, Massachusetts (2010) and the 54th Venice Biennial (2011). In 2017, he collaborated with the University of Cambridge. An SLS object from his "Resonance" project is part of the permanent collection at the FRAC Centre in Orleans, France.

Díaz’s installation ULTRA was featured at Art Basel Miami Beach as part of MoMA PS1’s programming.

== Robotics ==
In 1999, Federico Díaz began developing an autonomous anthropomorphic augmented structure called “Mnemeg” that responded to visitors in the gallery space. This was an early experiment with algorithms that informed subsequent works, including "Geometric Death Frequency-141" for MASS MoCA (2010) and "Outside Itself" for the Venice Biennale (2011).

Díaz presented findings from these projects at the conference Digital Handwerk at the Architekturforum Zurich, organized by ETH and the studio of Gramazio & Kohler, and later at the RobArch conference in Vienna.

Díaz’s project “LacrimAu” at Expo 2010 in Shanghai consisted of a glass cubicle containing a golden teardrop, designed to respond to a single visitor’s brainwaves.

In 2013, Díaz began experimenting with printing mechanisms as tools for creating algorithmic paintings based on audience movement patterns in the exhibition space. This technique was presented in the project "You Welded the Ornament of the Times" (2014) at the CAFA Museum in Beijing.

In 2015, “Eccentric Gravity” was a site-specific intervention at Prague’s Royal Belvedere Pavilion (also called Queen Anne's Summer Palace), curated by Jérôme Sans and Jen Kratochvil.

Díaz's long-term project "Big Light" has been presented at the Brno House of Arts (2016) and in collaboration with the University of Cambridge (2017).

== Awards ==
From 1996 to 2002, Díaz was a finalist for the Jindřich Chalupecký Award, granted to Czech artists under 35 years of age. In 2001, Díaz received a special award from the Nicola Trussardi Foundation for his work "Generatrix" at Milano Europe Futuro Presente. In 2007, Díaz received the Premio Internazionale Lorenzo il Magnifico for digital media at the Florence Biennale.

== Selected works and projects ==
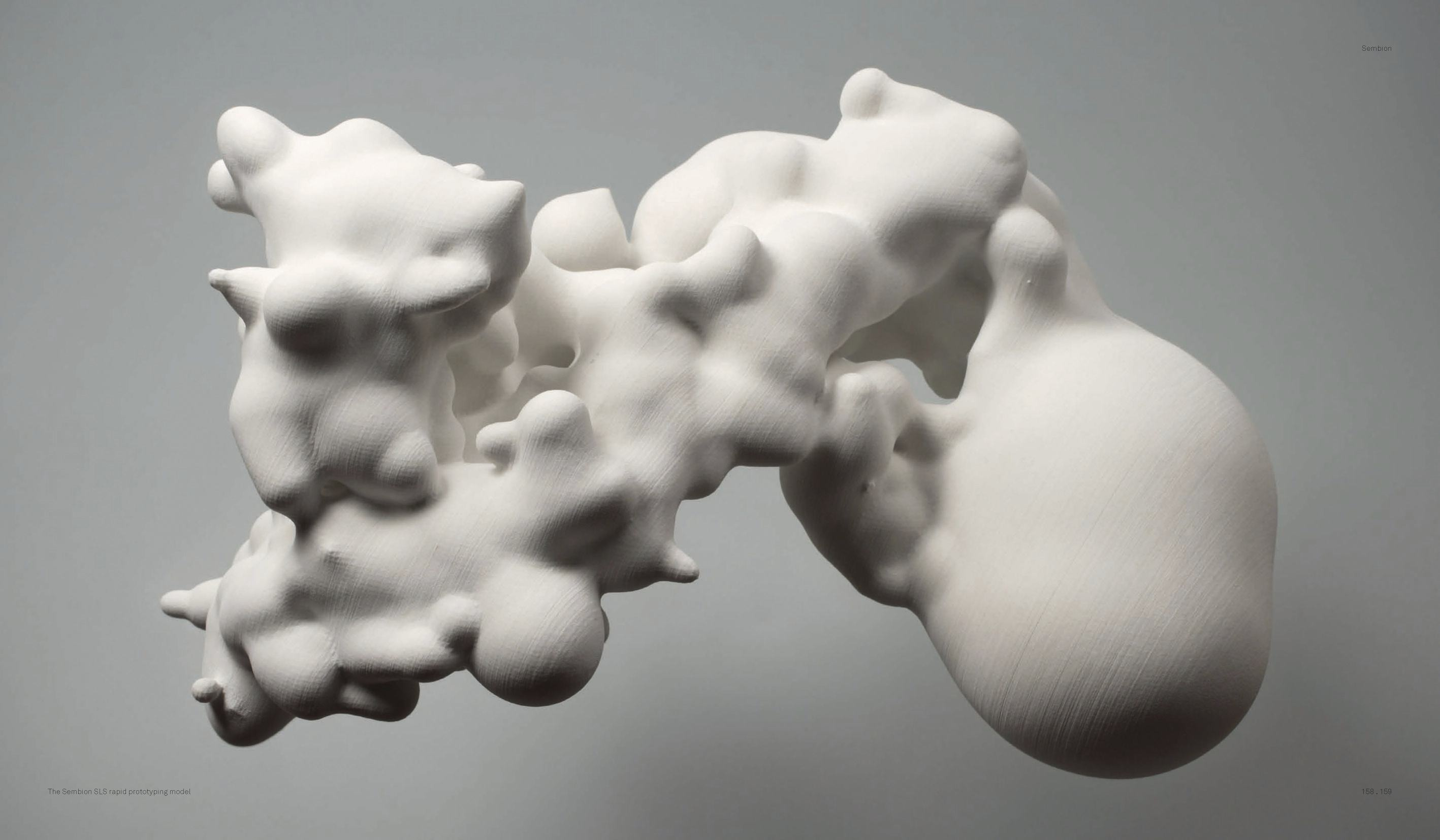
Sembion

Eccentric Gravity

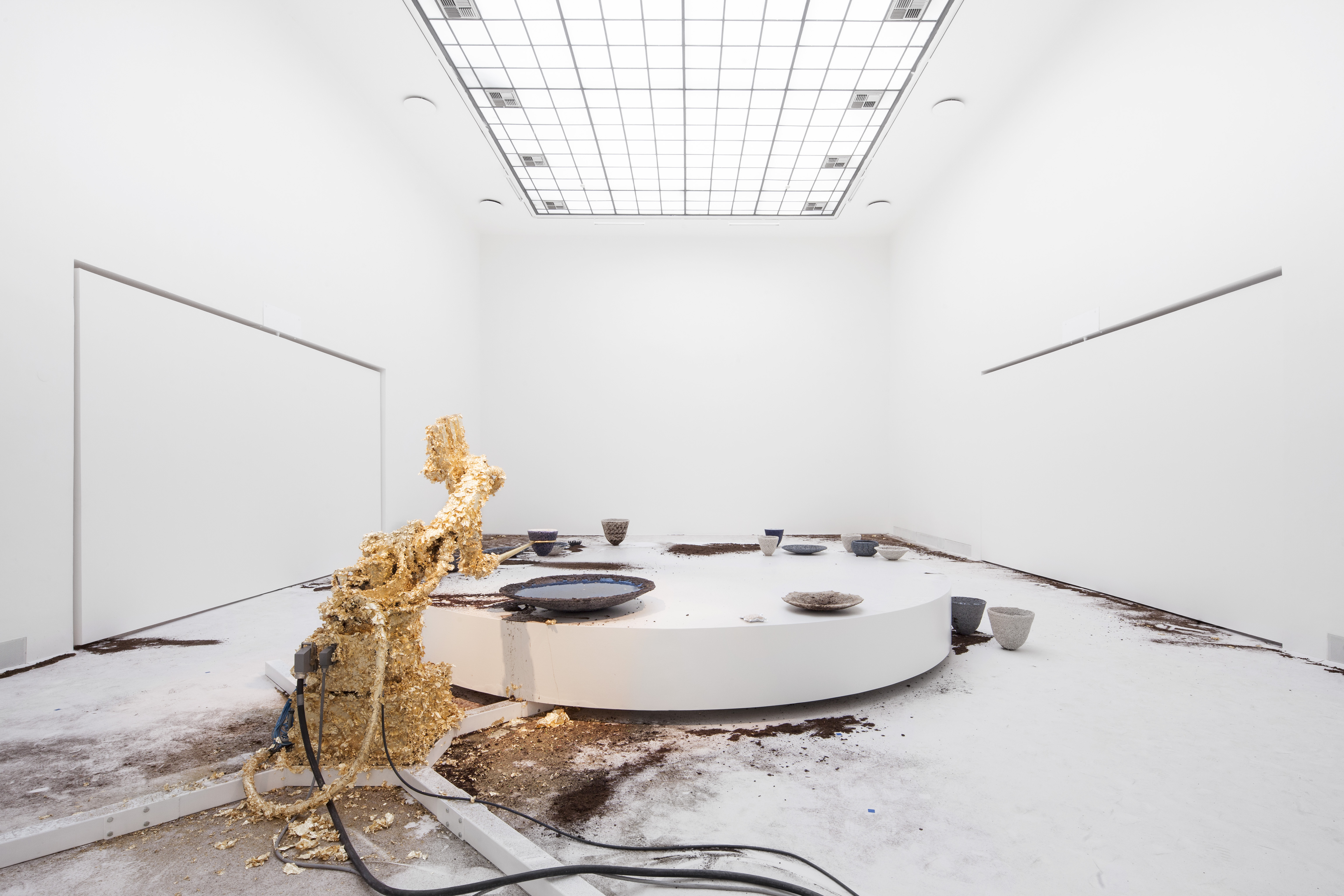
Big Light

- Dehibernation I, II (1993-1994) Exhibited at the Biennale of Young Art at City Gallery Prague in 1994 and at the Netz Europa exhibition in Linz, Austria.
- Spin (1994)
- Photon I, II (1996-1997)
- Empact (1998)
- Mnemeg (1999–2002)
- Generatrix (1999–2002)
- Sembion (2003–2004) Created in cooperation with the Research Centre at the Academy of Fine Arts in Prague and Jiří Ševčík, a Czech art theorist. The project has been presented at Die Algorithmische Revolution at the Center for Art and Media Karlsruhe, and the Institute of Contemporary Arts London.
- Sakura (2004–2005)
- Fluid F1 (2006)
- Efekt (2006)
- Resonance (2007)
- Ultra (2008)
- Adhesion (2009)
- LacrimAu (2010)
- Geometric Death Frequency-141 (2010) A site-specific installation for MASS MoCA in Massachusetts.
- You Welded the Ornament of the Times (2014) Walls in the CAFA Art Museum in Beijing serve as canvases; an automated plotter system layers traditional ink on the surface, creating a permanent record of the activity.
- Outside Itself (2011) created specifically for the Arsenale at the Venice Biennial 2011 as part of ILLUMInations.
- Eccentric Gravity (2015) utilizes the architectural features of Prague Castle's Belvedere Palace as the ground plan for a reflection on the building's history.
- Big Light (2016) The Brno House of Arts dedicated its historic International Style galleries to Díaz for an experimental laboratory and information centre.
- Big Light Space of Augmented Suggestion (2017)
- Subtile Sacramento (2017–2018)
- Big Light I'm Leaving the Body (2019)
- Eccentric Gravity: Heraldic (2015–2020)
- Aerial (Na Horu) (2018–2022), a monumental public sculpture in Prague, Czech Republic
- BOAR (2022) Part of the 12th Berlin Biennale for Contemporary Art. Commissioned by LAS. Site-specific robotic performance created with novelist and technologist, J.M. Ledgard. Utilized a SPOT, developed by Boston Dynamics, to imitate a wild boar through artificial intelligence.
- BIOTOPIA (2025) In conjunction with The Why Factory at the 19th International Architecture Exhibition of La Biennale di Venezia
