= Kyiv International Film Festival "Molodist" =

Annual film festival in Kyiv, Ukraine

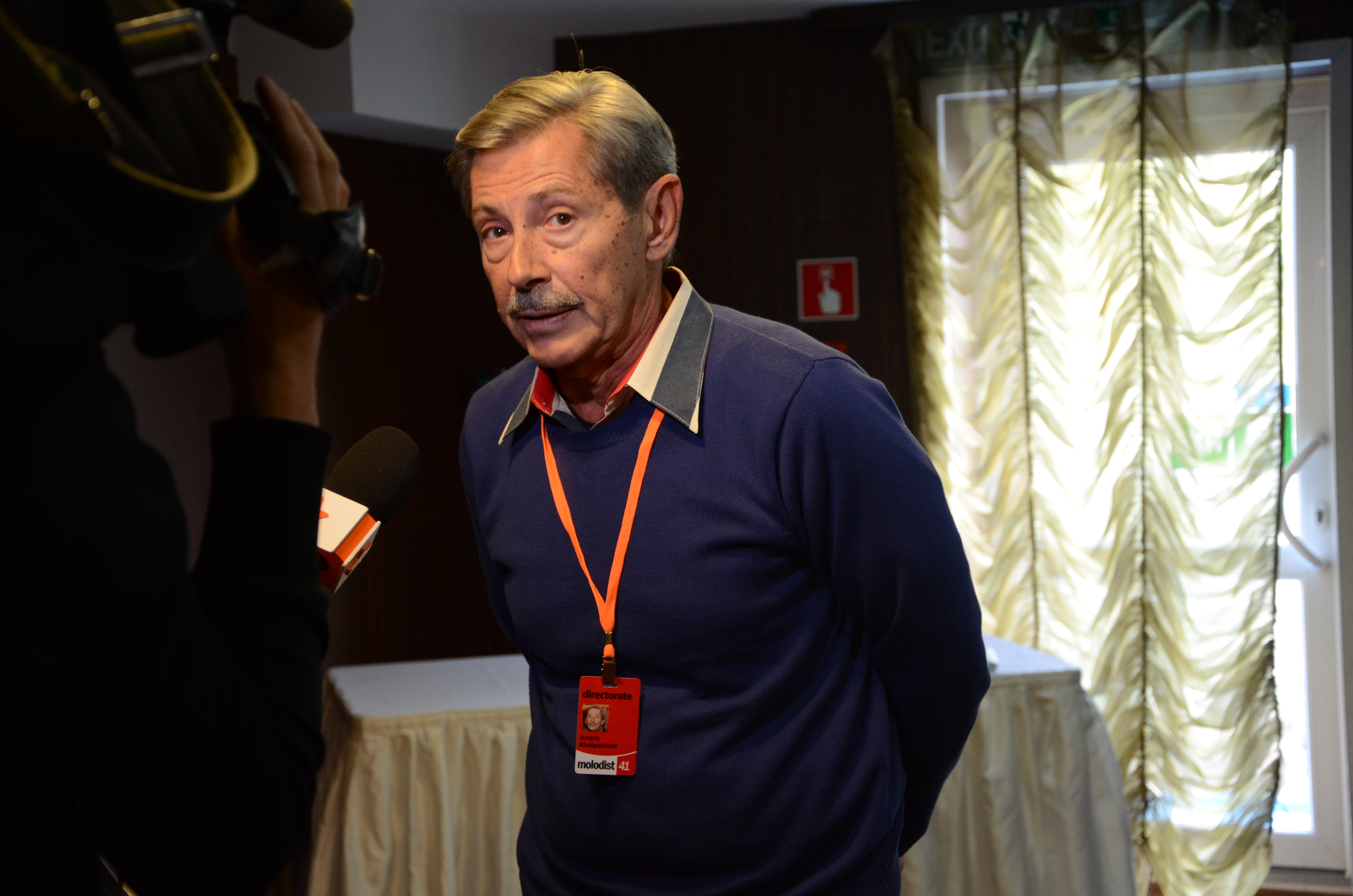
Andrey Khalpakhchi at the Molodist International Film Festival

Kyiv International Film Festival "Molodist", also known as the Molodist International Film Festival (Ukrainian: Київський Міжнародний Кінофестиваль "Молодість", romanized: Kyivskyi Mizhnarodnyi Kinofestyval "Molodist"), is an international film festival which takes place every October in Kyiv, Ukraine. It began in 1970 as a two-day festival of films, shot by students of Kyiv State Institute of Theatrical Arts, presenting 33 movies that year. In 2010, there were 439 films presented, making it the biggest film festival in Ukraine, with an audience of 127,000. The president of the festival is Andrii Khalpakhchi (Андрій Халпахчі).

It is the only film festival in Ukraine accredited by FIAPF (since 1991). It belongs to the list of 26 specialized international competition festivals.

Currently recognized European producers have debuted at the Molodist festival: Fred Keleman, Tom Tykwer, Danny Boyle, Francois Ozon, Andras Monori, Ildikó Enyedi, Hera Popelaars, Jacques Audiard, Sergiy Masloboychykova, Oleksiy Balabanov, Denys Evstigneev, Stephen Doldri.

The Molodist participants were later honored with the Golden Palm (Bruno Dumont) and the Oscar (Alan Berliner).

== Overview ==
This is the only Film Festival in Ukraine, which is accredited by FIAPF (since 1993). It belongs to the list of 26 specialized international competitive festivals.

Another festival visit about 200 guests. The geography of competitive works belongs to the countries of almost all continents. The organizers invite participants in the competition, members of the jury, star actors and directors. Many of them conduct master classes and represent their films by viewers.

The main task of the festival is to promote the development of young professional cinema. The competition program of the festival annually presents in Ukraine the works of talented young people from all continents selected at dozens of national and international film reviews.

On the "youth" there were debuts today recognized European stages: Fred Kelemen, Tom Tykwer, Danny Boyle, Francois Ozon, Andras Monari, Ildico End, Hera Popelayar, Sergey Maslavyschikova, Oleksiy Balabanov, Denisa Eugene, and others. The participants of the “youth” later noted the “gold palm branch” (Bruno Dumon) and Oscar (Alain Berliner).

The main sections are student, the first short (feature, animated, documentary) and the first full-length feature film.

The traditional festival center at the moment is the Kyiv Cinema Cultural Center, and festival screenings also take place in 3-5 other cinemas, such as Zhovten, Kinopanorama, Kyivska Rus, and Kinopalats.

At the 73rd Berlin International Film Festival in 2023, festival organizers Andriy Khalpakhchi and Bohdan Zhuk were presented with a special Teddy Award to honour their support of LGBTQ-themed cinema, through the 2001 creation of the Sunny Bunny Award for LGBTQ-themed films at Molodist and the January 2023 launch of a standalone Sunny Bunny film festival.
